= Tanjung Harapan Airport =

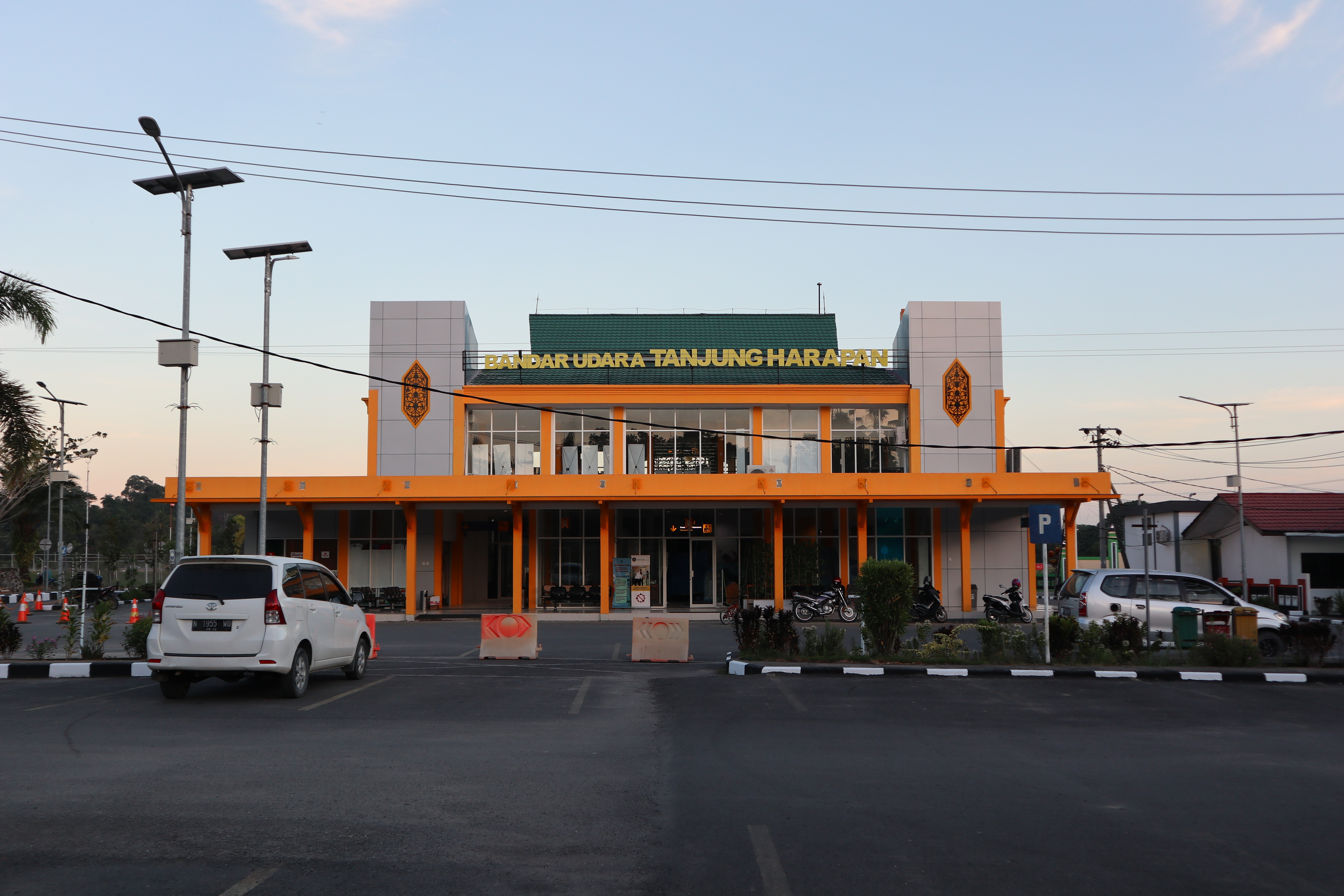
- IATA: TJS; ICAO: WAGD

Summary
- Airport type: Public
- Owner: Government of Indonesia
- Operator: Directorate General of Civil Aviation
- Serves: Tanjung Selor
- Location: Tanjung Selor, Bulungan Regency, North Kalimantan, Indonesia
- Time zone: WITA (UTC+08:00)
- Elevation AMSL: 10 ft (3.0 m)
- Coordinates: 02°50′11″N 117°22′25″E

Map
- Location of airport in Indonesia

Runways
Direction	Length		Surface
Direction	ft	m	Surface
03/21	5,249	1,600	Asphalt

Statistics (2024)
- Passengers: 8,264 (▼58.4%)
- Cargo (tonnes): 29.49 (▲125.6%)
- Aircraft movements: 716 (▼16.6%)
- Source: DGCA

Tanjung Harapan Airport (IATA: TJS, ICAO: WAGD) is a domestic regional airport serving Tanjung Selor, the provincial capital of North Kalimantan and the administrative seat of Bulungan Regency, Indonesia. It is located on the island of Kalimantan, also known as Borneo. The airport is situated near the Tanjung Selor town center, approximately 300 m (0.2 mi) from the North Kalimantan Governor's Office. It serves as the main air gateway to Tanjung Selor, Bulungan Regency, and the surrounding areas. The airport is currently connected to Balikpapan in East Kalimantan by flights operated by Wings Air, providing onward connections to other cities in Indonesia. It also serves pioneer flights to remote areas of North Kalimantan, such as Long Apung and Long Bawang, operated by Susi Air.

== History ==
=== Construction and early history ===
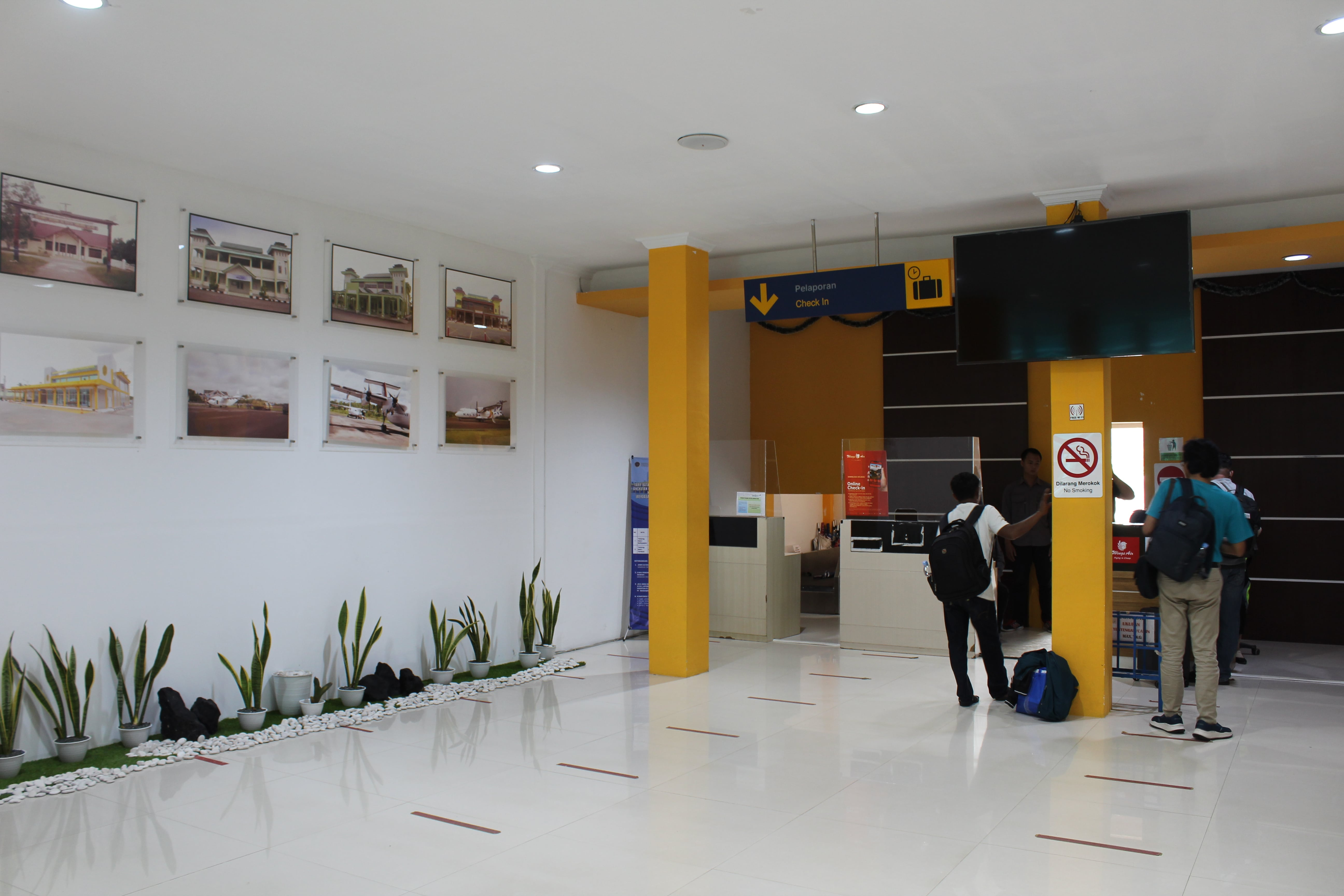
Check-in counters

Construction of Tanjung Harapan Airport began in 1974, marking an early step in the development of air transportation infrastructure in Bulungan Regency. Following several years of construction, the airport officially commenced operations in 1978. At the time, the airport had a single 750 m runway, which was capable of accommodating only small aircraft. During its initial years of operation, from 1978 to 1984, the airport was managed by the Bulungan Regency government, playing an important role in supporting local mobility and economic development.

In 1984, management of the airport was transferred to Juwata Airport in Tarakan. This administrative arrangement brought changes to the management and provision of aviation services and remained in place until 1992. At the time, the airport remained relatively modest, with facilities capable of accommodating only small aircraft such as Cessna aircraft, the Short SC.7 Skyvan, and the de Havilland Canada DHC-6 Twin Otter.

By the early 1990s, the airport was still designated as a rural airport and served exclusively by pioneer flights. It operated several pioneer routes, including a service to Samarinda, the provincial capital of East Kalimantan, operated by Merpati Nusantara Airlines. In 1992, the management of Tanjung Harapan Airport was separated from Juwata Airport, making it an independent airport with its own management. This marked a new phase in the airport's development, allowing its infrastructure and aviation services to be managed and expanded more independently. At the same time, the runway was extended to 900 m in length.

In the early 2000s, the airport was served by several airlines, including Kalstar Aviation and Dirgantara Air Services (DAS), which operated interprovincial routes within East Kalimantan to destinations such as Balikpapan, Tarakan, and Tanjung Redeb.

With the establishment of North Kalimantan as a separate province from East Kalimantan and the designation of Tanjung Selor as its provincial capital in 2012, the importance of the airport increased significantly. Despite this, the airport remained relatively small compared with Juwata Airport in Tarakan. In response to the anticipated growth in passenger traffic to Tanjung Selor, the provincial government subsequently planned a major development program to expand and modernize the airport.

=== Contemporary history ===
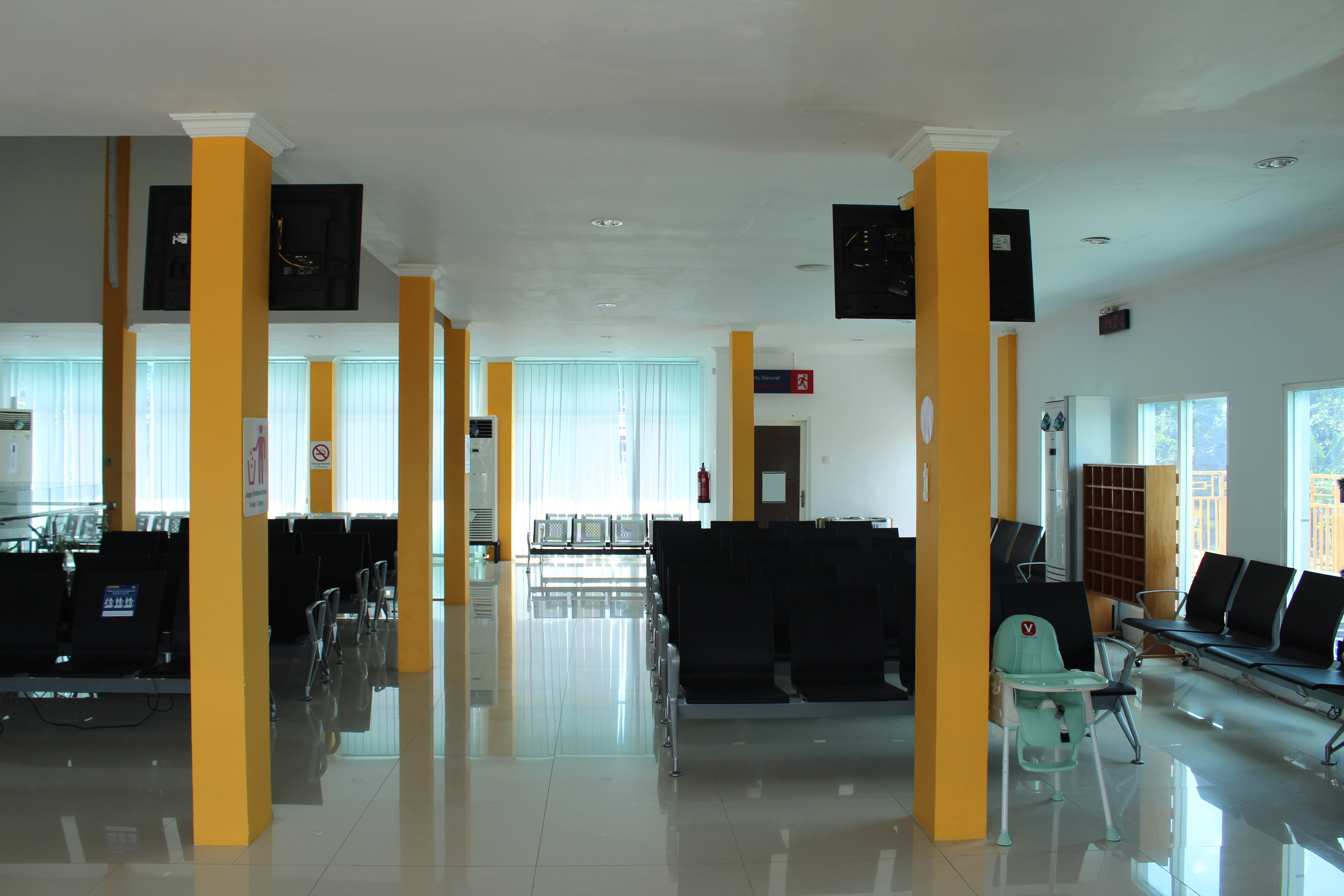
Departure gate

In 2015, the 1,200 meters runway was extended to 1,600 meters to accommodate ATR-72 so passengers from Tanjung Harapan Airport could fly directly to Balikpapan without having to transit in Tarakan. It was decided to use the 2015 North Kalimantan Province budget with an amount of Rp 10 billion ($0.8 million) to extend the runway 350 meters towards the hill (direction TH 21) and 50 meters towards the Selor River (direction TH 03). The hill was cut and the road at the hill was relocated. Following the runway extension, several airlines expressed interest in operating ATR 72 aircraft at the airport, with Kalstar Aviation reportedly considering the launch of a Tanjung Selor–Balikpapan route using the type.

On 8 August 2017, the first ATR 72-600 operated by Wings Air landed at the airport, marking the introduction of larger regional aircraft to Tanjung Harapan. Shortly thereafter, on 11 September 2017, Wings Air inaugurated a scheduled service between Tanjung Selor and Balikpapan. Other airlines soon followed suit, with NAM Air launching its own scheduled service between Tanjung Selor and Balikpapan in August 2018, also using the ATR 72-600. With the introduction of these new services, passenger traffic at Tanjung Harapan Airport increased significantly. The North Kalimantan provincial government also pledged to continue developing the airport to accommodate larger aircraft and explore the possibility of establishing new routes to Makassar and Jakarta.

In February 2018, Kalstar Aviation, which had served the airport for several years, ceased operations. Following its withdrawal, Xpress Air took over several of its former routes, including the Tarakan–Tanjung Selor–Samarinda route.

In October 2019, a proposal was put forward to rename the airport Sultan Djalaluddin Airport, after a former ruler of the Bulungan Sultanate. However, the proposal was rejected by the Bulungan Regency Regional People's Representative Council (DPRD), because the name Djalaluddin was already in use at another airport in Gorontalo. The airport renaming proposal resurfaced in 2022, this time with the proposed name Sultan Maulana Muhammad Kasimuddin Airport, after another former ruler of the Bulungan Sultanate. However, the Bulungan Regency Government and the local branch of the Ministry of Transportation continued to discuss several potential names for the airport.

== Facilities and development ==
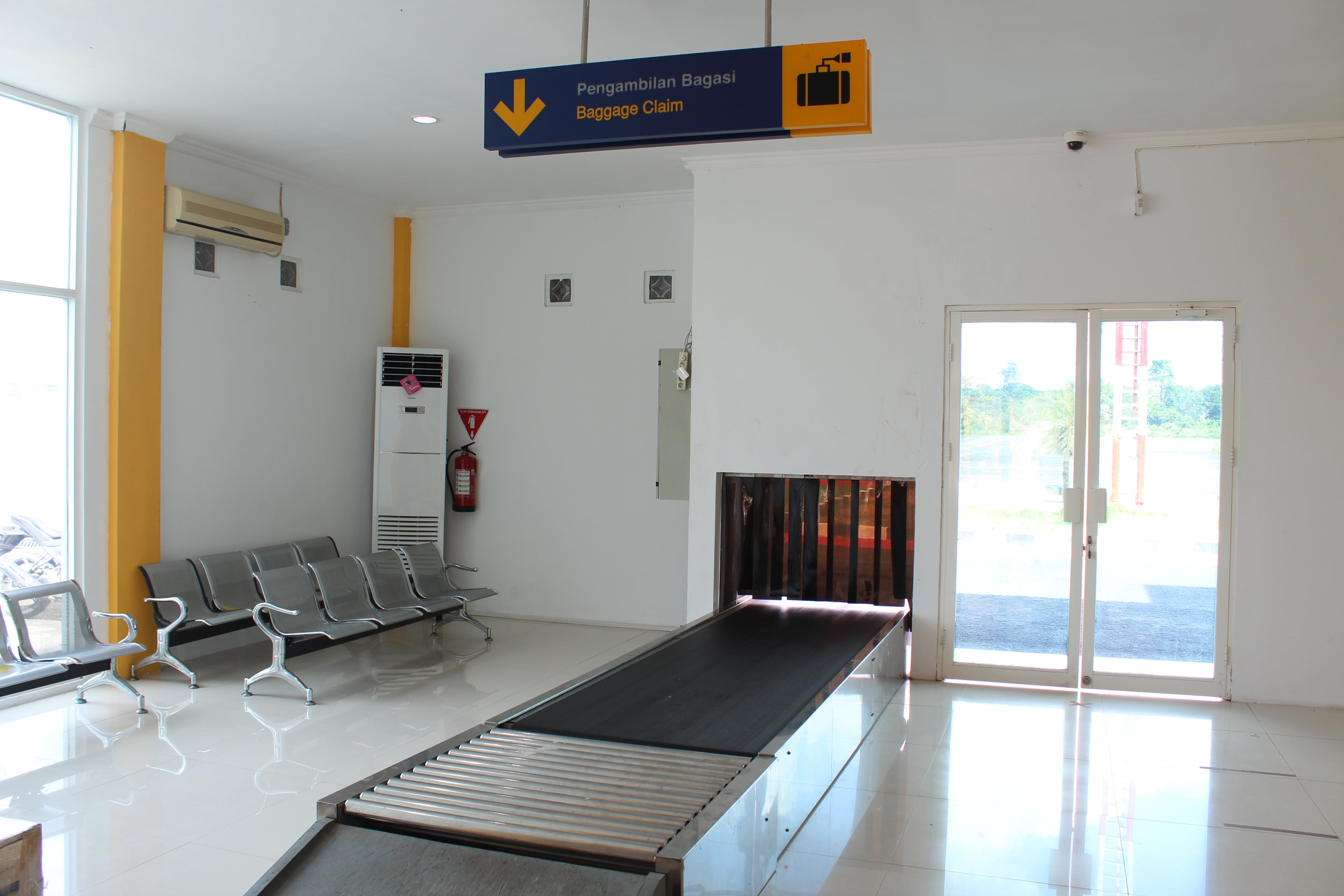
Baggage claim area

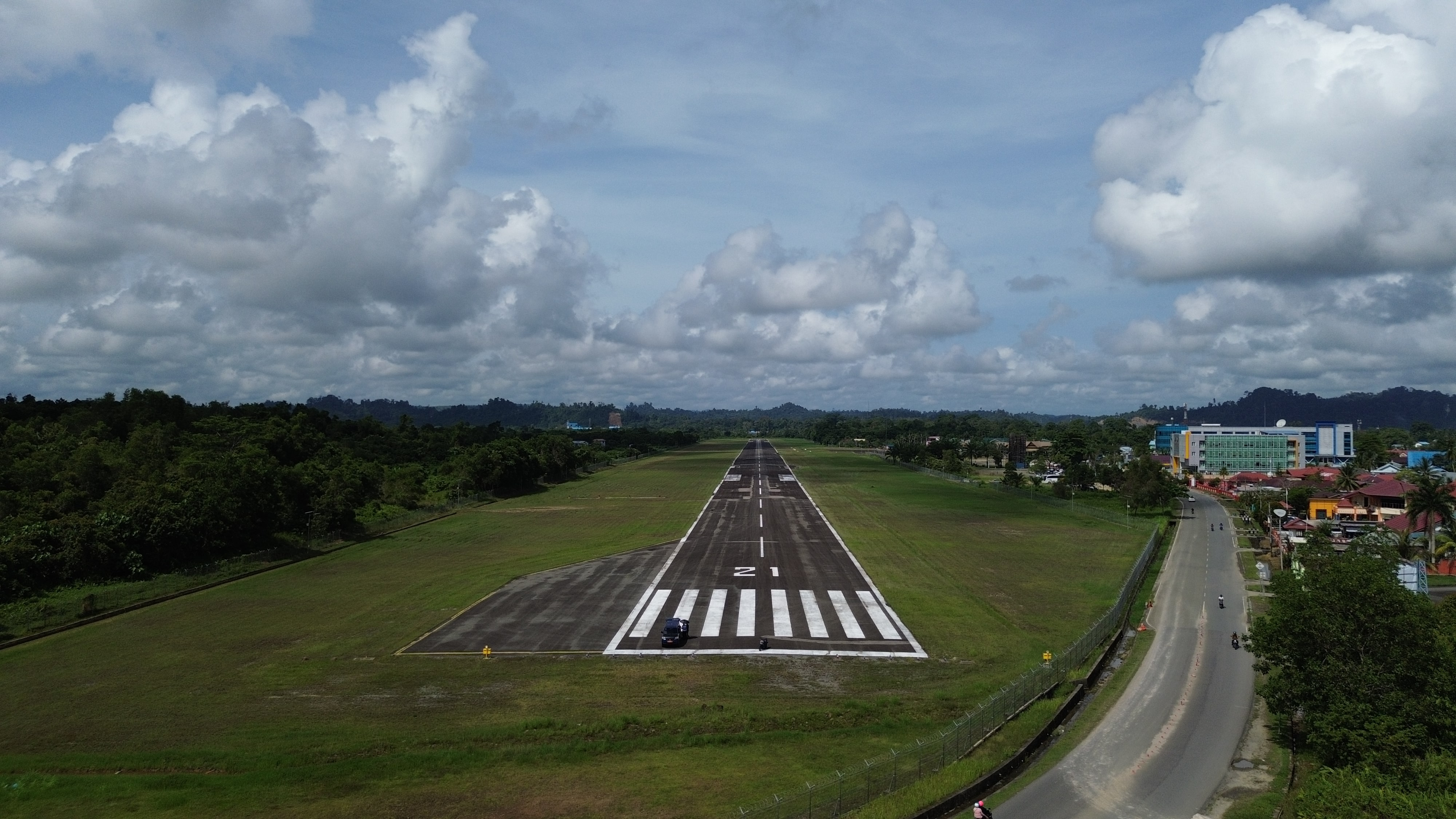
Runway view

The passenger terminal has an area of 983 m². A minor renovation of the terminal was carried out in 2018, which included the renovation and expansion of the passenger waiting area. The expanded waiting area increased its capacity from approximately 120 to 250 passengers and provides approximately 13 m² of space per passenger. Other supporting facilities were also added, including an ATM centre, a lactation room for breastfeeding mothers, and facilities for passengers with disabilities or special needs. The airport also added a health clinic and expanded its canteen facilities. The renovation cost approximately Rp4.5 billion and was funded through the state budget (APBN). The government also plans to construct a new, larger passenger terminal in the future to accommodate increasing passenger traffic. The proposed terminal would be located across the runway from the existing terminal, with approximately 200 hectares of land planned to be acquired and cleared for the development.

On the airside, the airport has a single runway measuring 1,600 m × 30 m, which, following its extension, is capable of accommodating aircraft up to the size of the ATR 72. Prior to the extension, the runway was only 1,200 m long and could accommodate smaller aircraft such as the ATR 42 and Cessna Grand Caravan. The runway is planned to be extended further, initially to 1,850 m to accommodate larger aircraft such as the Bombardier CRJ1000 and Boeing 737-300, with a long-term target of 2,500 m. The proposed extension would enable the airport to accommodate narrow-body aircraft, including all variants of the Boeing 737 and Airbus A320 families. Besides the runway, the airport is equipped with two taxiways measuring 46.5 × 15 m and a single apron measuring 155 × 65 m. The government plans to invest Rp1 billion from the state budget (APBN) and Rp17 billion from the regional budget (APBD) in 2020 for further development of the airport's airside facilities, including the runway extension, runway lighting system, aircraft apron, and airport perimeter fencing. The planned development would require an additional 229 hectares of land to be cleared.

=== New airport ===
Due to the limited land available for further expansion, particularly as the runway extension is constrained by a national road and a river, the government has considered relocating the airport instead. Although the river could theoretically be relocated, doing so would be costly. Several locations have been proposed for the construction of a new airport, including Sajau Village in East Tanjung Palas District, Salimbatu Village in Central Tanjung Palas District, Tanjung Buyu in Tanjung Selor, and Bhayangkara Village in West Tanjung Palas District. Of these, West Tanjung Palas District is currently considered the most viable location for the proposed new airport, as the area historically had an airstrip.

== Airlines and destinations ==
The following airlines offer scheduled passenger service:

Airlines	Destinations
Susi Air	Long Apung, Long Bawan
Wings Air	Balikpapan

== Statistics ==
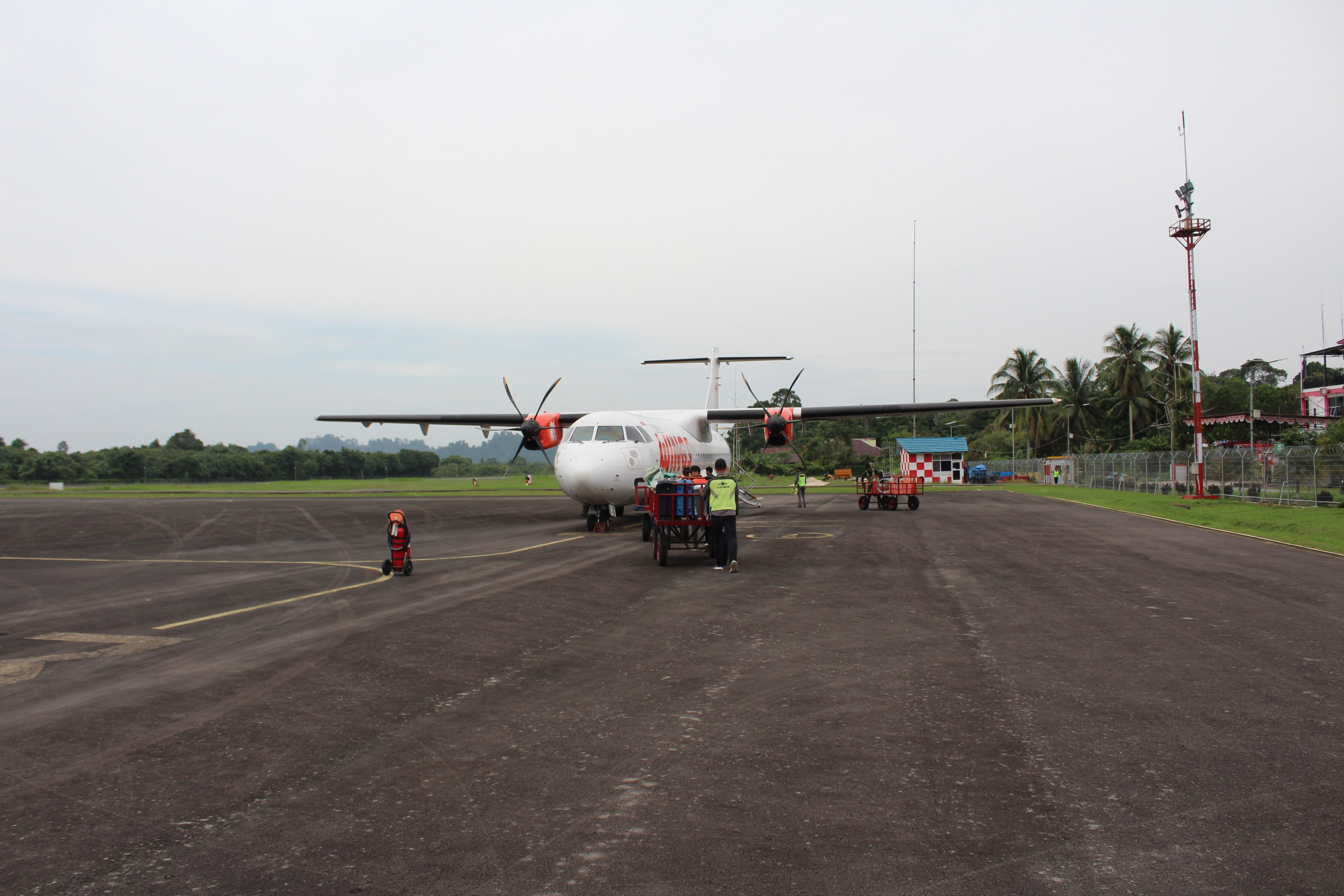
A Wings Air ATR 72 at Tanjung Harapan Airport

Annual passenger numbers and aircraft statistics
Year	Passengers handled	Passenger % change	Cargo (tonnes)	Cargo % change	Aircraft movements	Aircraft % change
2006	26,922	Steady	77.82	Steady	1,312	Steady
2007	12,294	▼54.3	33.26	▼57.3	640	▼51.2
2008	8,559	▼30.4	60.85	▲83.0	618	▼3.4
2009	1,436	▼83.2	45.05	▼26.0	158	▼74.4
2010	4,767	▲232.0	33.13	▼26.5	392	▲148.1
2011	7,970	▲67.2	3.39	▼89.8	1,172	▲199.0
2012	4,148	▼48.0	1.40	▼58.7	862	▼26.5
2013	25,784	▲521.6	45.33	▲3137.9	2,232	▲158.9
2014	34,213	▲32.7	75.24	▲66.0	1,954	▼12.5
2015	28,570	▼16.5	96.12	▲27.8	2,139	▲9.5
2016	32,732	▲14.6	116.73	▲21.4	2,368	▲10.7
2017	25,619	▼21.7	45.76	▼60.8	1,798	▼24.1
2018	54,665	▲113.4	13.35	▼70.8	2,272	▲26.4
2019	53,418	▼2.3	66.66	▲399.3	1,940	▼14.6
2020	16,685	▼68.8	19.05	▼71.4	1,016	▼47.6
2021	7,153	▼57.1	13.96	▼26.7	1,012	▼0.4
2022	36,313	▲407.7	9.23	▼33.9	1,166	▲15.2
2023	19,845	▼45.4	13.07	▲41.6	858	▼26.4
2024	8,264	▼58.4	29.49	▲125.6	716	▼16.6
^{Source: DGCA, BPS}
