= North Kalimantan (electoral district) =

- Kalimantan Utara
- Constituency for the People's Representative Council
- Region: Province of North Kalimantan at-large (See below)
- Population: 713.622 (2021)
- Electorate: 450.108 (2019)

Current constituency
- Created: 2019; 7 years ago
- Seats: 3
- Members: Deddy Yevri Hanteru Sitorus (PDI-P); Arkanata Akram (NasDem); Hasan Saleh (Demokrat)
- Created from: East Kalimantan

North Kalimantan (Indonesian: Kalimantan Utara) is an electoral district in Indonesia. The electoral district encompasses of North Kalimantan at large.

Although North Kalimantan Utara has been expanded as a new province since 2012, representation in the People's Representative Council (DPR) was done by the electoral district of East Kalimantan. North Kalimantan is represented as separate district in the 2019 Indonesian legislative election, which sent three members of the DPR.

== Components ==
- 2019–present: All cities and regencies of North Kalimantan (Bulungan, Malinau, Nunukan, Tana Tidung regencies and Tarakan City)

== List of members ==
The following list is in alphabetical order. Party with the largest number of members is placed on top of the list.

Election	Member	Party
2019	Deddy Yevri Hanteru Sitorus	PDI-P
2019	Arkanata Akram	NasDem
2019	Hasan Saleh	Demokrat
2024	Deddy Yevri Hanteru Sitorus	PDI-P
2024	Hasan Saleh	Demokrat
2024	Rahmawati	Gerindra

== See also ==
- List of Indonesian national electoral districts
