= List of incumbent regional heads and deputy regional heads in North Kalimantan =

The following is an article about the list of Regional Heads and Deputy Regional Heads in 5 regencies/cities in North Kalimantan who are currently still serving.

== List ==
Regency/ City	Photo of the Regent/ Mayor	Regent/ Mayor	Photo of Deputy Regent/ Mayor	Deputy Regent/ Mayor	Taking Office	End of Office (Planned)	Ref.
Bulungan; Regency List of Regents/Deputy Regents		Syarwani		Kilat	20 February 2025	20 February 2030	
Malinau; Regency List of Regents/Deputy Regents		Wempi Wellem Mawa		Jakaria	20 February 2025	20 February 2030	
Nunukan; Regency List of Regents/Deputy Regents		Irwan Sabri		Hermanus	20 February 2025	20 February 2030	
Tana Tidung; Regency List of Regents/Deputy Regents		Ibrahim Ali		Sabri	20 February 2025	20 February 2030	
Tarakan; City List of Mayors/Deputy mayors		Khairul		Ibnu Saud Is	20 February 2025	20 February 2030	

Notes

- "Commencement of office" is the inauguration date at the beginning or during the current term of office. For acting regents/mayors, it is the date of appointment or extension as acting regent/mayor.
- Based on the Constitutional Court decision Number 27/PUU-XXII/2024, the Governor and Deputy Governor, Regent and Deputy Regent, and Mayor and Deputy Mayor elected in 2020 shall serve until the inauguration of the Governor and Deputy Governor, Regent and Deputy Regent, and Mayor and Deputy Mayor elected in the 2024 national simultaneous elections as long as the term of office does not exceed 5 (five) years.

== See also ==
- North Kalimantan
