= Bulungan language =

Austronesian language of Indonesia

Bulungan
- Native to: Indonesia
- Region: North Kalimantan
- Ethnicity: Bulungan
- Native speakers: 30,000 (2002)
- Language family: Austronesian: Malayo-Polynesian; Greater North Borneo (?); Sabahan (?); Bulungan

Language codes
- ISO 639-3: blj
- Glottolog: bolo1268

Bulungan (also known as Bolongan and Bulongan, both are archaic), is an Austronesian language spoken in Bulungan Regency, North Kalimantan. The language was the court language of the Bulungan Sultanate. The classification of this language is not clear. Glottolog places it in the Sabahan group.

== Geographic distribution ==
The Bulungan language is predominantly spoken in eight villages in Bulungan Regency, namely:

- Tanjung Palas: Antutan, Tanjung Palas Ulu, Tanjung Palas Tengah, Tanjung Palas Ilir
- West Tanjung Palas: Mara Ilir
- East Tanjung Palas: Mangkupadi
- Peso: Long Bia
- Sekatak: Sekatak Puji

== Phonology ==
=== Consonants ===
Consonants
		Labial	Alveolar	Palatal	Velar	Uvular	Glottal
Nasal		m	n	ɲ ⟨ny⟩	ŋ ⟨ng⟩		
Stop	Voiceless	p	t	c	k		ʔ ⟨q⟩
Stop	Voiced	b	d	ɟ ⟨j⟩	ɡ ⟨g⟩		
Fricative			s				h
Lateral			l				
Trill						ʀ ⟨r⟩	
Semivowel		w		j ⟨y⟩			

Consonants /f/, /z/, and /h/ are restricted to loan words, and the first two could be respectively substituted with [p] and [s]. The last of three, however, has been dropped during the course of its history (atay ('liver') vs. Indonesian hati). The phoneme /k/ does not exist in the final position, and instead replaced by a glottal stop (/ʔ/), as in sigoq ('happy').

=== Vowels ===
Vowels
	Front	Central	Back
High	i		u
Mid	e ⟨é⟩	ə ⟨e⟩	o
Low		a	

There are three diphthongs in Bulungan, all of them only occur word-finally, namely /aj/, /aw/, and /uj/.

=== Stress ===
Words are stressed on the penultimate syllable, regardless of its structure: mendus 'to bath', mendusna 'go bath now!'.

== Sources ==
- Adul, M. Asfandi (1985). Struktur Bahasa Bulungan (PDF). Jakarta: Pusat Pembinaan dan Pengembangan Bahasa.
