= Tideng Pale =

Village in Tana Tidung Regency, North Kalimantan, Indonesia

Coordinates: 3°36′30″N 116°54′25″E

Tideng Pale (abbreviated as: TDP) is a village in Tana Tidung Regency, North Kalimantan Province of Indonesia and the administrative capital of its regency.

== Climate ==
Tideng Pale has a tropical rainforest climate (Af) with heavy rainfall year-round.

Climate data for Tideng Pale
Month	Jan	Feb	Mar	Apr	May	Jun	Jul	Aug	Sep	Oct	Nov	Dec	Year
Mean daily maximum °C (°F)	29.8 (85.6)	29.7 (85.5)	30.1 (86.2)	30.6 (87.1)	30.8 (87.4)	30.8 (87.4)	30.8 (87.4)	30.9 (87.6)	30.7 (87.3)	30.7 (87.3)	30.5 (86.9)	30.1 (86.2)	30.5 (86.8)
Daily mean °C (°F)	26.4 (79.5)	26.3 (79.3)	26.7 (80.1)	27.1 (80.8)	27.2 (81.0)	27.1 (80.8)	26.9 (80.4)	27.0 (80.6)	26.8 (80.2)	26.9 (80.4)	26.8 (80.2)	26.6 (79.9)	26.8 (80.3)
Mean daily minimum °C (°F)	23.0 (73.4)	23.0 (73.4)	23.3 (73.9)	23.6 (74.5)	23.6 (74.5)	23.5 (74.3)	23.1 (73.6)	23.1 (73.6)	23.0 (73.4)	23.1 (73.6)	23.1 (73.6)	23.2 (73.8)	23.2 (73.8)
Average rainfall mm (inches)	217 (8.5)	193 (7.6)	251 (9.9)	256 (10.1)	331 (13.0)	302 (11.9)	282 (11.1)	275 (10.8)	299 (11.8)	304 (12.0)	319 (12.6)	273 (10.7)	3,302 (130)
Source: Climate-Data.org
