= Tana Tidung Regency =

Regency in North Kalimantan, Indonesia

Coordinates: 3.5500°N 117.2500°E

Tana Tidung
- Regency
- Tana Tidung Regency; Kabupaten Tana Tidung
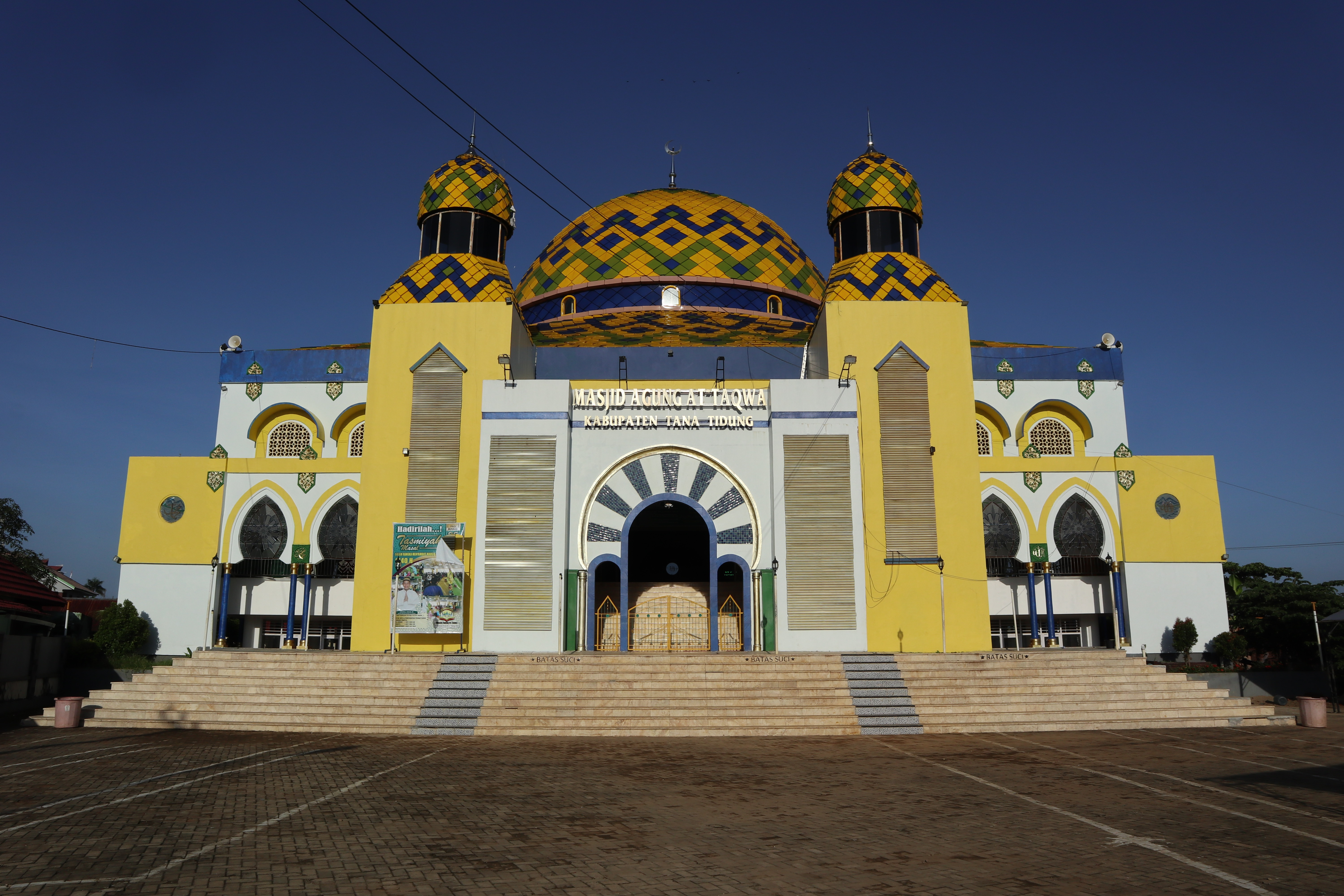
- At-Taqwa Mosque, Tana Tidung

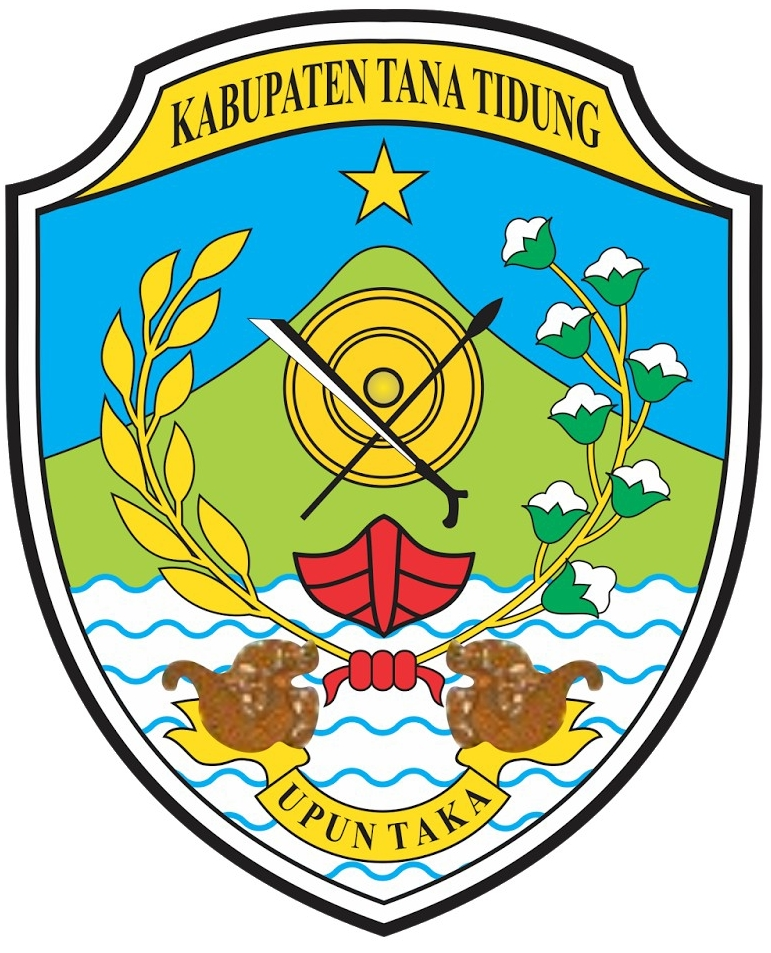
- Coat of arms
- Motto: Upun Taka (Southern Tidung) "Our Land"
- Location of Tana Tidung Regency in North Kalimantan
- Country: Indonesia
- Province: North Kalimantan
- Regency seat: Tideng Pale

Government
  - Regent: Ibrahim Ali
  - Vice Regent: Sabri

Area
  - Total: 3,858.31 km^{2} (1,489.70 sq mi)

Population (mid 2024 estimate)
  - Total: 30,036
  - Density: 7.7848/km^{2} (20.162/sq mi)
- Time zone: UTC+8 (Central Indonesian Time)
- HDI (2019): ▼0.678 (Medium)
- Website: tanatidungkab.go.id

Tana Tidung Regency is a regency within the Indonesian province of North Kalimantan. It is Indonesia's least populous regency, with 25,584 inhabitants recorded in the 2020 census; the official estimate as at mid 2024 was 30,036 (comprising 15,762 males and 14,274 females). Its regency seat is the town of Tideng Pale, in Sesayap District, where 12,364 of the regency's population lived in mid 2024.

Created on 17 July 2007 by splitting off the most northern three districts of Bulungan Regency, it is a relatively new regency and the smallest in terms of land area in North Kalimantan province (3,858.31 km^{2}). The regency has the lowest poverty rate in the province, and is the second least-densely populated area after the Malinau Regency. Historically, the region is the cultural center of the Tidung people and was home to the Kingdom of Tidung.

== History ==
=== Etymology ===
The name Tidung comes from the word tiding or tideng, which means "hills" or "mountains". Tana Tidung roughly means "Land of Tidung", referring to the region as the homeland of the Tidung people. The name of Tideng Pale town originates from two words, tideng and pale, meaning "bland", leading to the rough translation—"bland hill".

=== Early history ===
The region was home to a native kingdom known as the Tidung Kingdom, which dated back to the 11th century. The spread of Islam in Indonesia later influenced the region. The Tidung Kingdom's existence before the spread of Islam is disputed and some argue that rather than being a kingdom, it was a tribal confederacy. Another kingdom, Berayu, also existed in the region. Berayu's first king is thought to have been related to the people of Kutai Kingdom. It was centered in what is now Malinau Kota but had influence as far as southern Nunukan. The period of tribal kingdoms, also referred to as "ancient Tidung", ended with the marriage of Queen Ikenawai and Radja Laoet from the Sultanate of Sulu in 1557. A new Islamic kingdom centered on Tarakan Island was born and referred to as the Kalkan Kingdom or the Tenggara dynasty. In 1900, the Tidung Kingdom moved its capital from Tarakan to Malinau. Between the 18th and 19th centuries, the Tidung Kingdom was one of the area's major regional powers, together with the Sultanate of Bulungan. The newly arrived Dutch disrupted the resulting rivalry. A most notable event was a royal marriage between the Sultan of Bulungan and two princesses, one from Berau and one from Tidung. The last king of Tidung, Datoe Adil, adopted anti-Dutch policies and opposed monopolies over goods in the region imposed by the Dutch. This caused disputes in internal matters, resulting in Bulungan invading Tidung with the help of the Dutch in 1916. Tana Tidung became part of the Afdeeling Tidoengschelanden (Land of Tidung Administrative District) under the Dutch East Indies and later the newly formed Indonesian republic after the Indonesian National Revolution.

The conversion of people living in the region to Islam in the 15th and 16th centuries is generally believed by archeologists to be the start of the separate identity of the Tidung people from the nearby Dayak people. It is still disputed whether to classify the Tidung people as part of the larger Dayak group or as a separate native ethnic group like the Banjar people. Meanwhile, the Tidung people were classified by Tjilik Riwut as part of the Murut people. The Tidung people often referred to themselves as Islam Dayak or Dayak Muslims.

=== Post-independence ===
The desire of the Tidung people to have their own regency dated back to early 2000 after the fall of Suharto and the rapid decentralization that followed. On 28 November 2002, several of the region's cultural figures and politicians gathered in a hotel in Tarakan to discuss the creation of a new autonomous regency to represent their culture in areas where the majority of the Tidung people lived. The creation of a Tidung-dominated regency was realized based on Law Number 34 of 2007. The regency was inaugurated on 10 July 2007, and its first regent was sworn in on 18 December 2007. The regency was formed from three districts (kecamatan) which were formerly part of Bulungan Regency.

It had been part of the East Kalimantan province, but in 2012 became part of the newly created North Kalimantan province.

== Geography ==
The Tana Tidung Regency has a land area of 3,858.31 kilometres (2,397.44 mi). It borders the Nunukan Regency in the north, the Celebes Sea and the city of Tarakan in the east, the Malinau Regency in the west, and the Bulungan Regency in the south. The region's topography varies between 0–40% grade. However, most of it is considered a high-altitude region with steep slopes; most of its flat land with a slope of less than 8% is along the coast. The regency's soil composition is dominated by ultisol and inceptisol and is generally unsuitable for large-scale agriculture.

It has a tropical climate with high humidity, high annual rainfall, and relatively little changes in temperature, which sits between 21–25 °C (70–77 °F), with an average of 26.9 °C (80.4 °F). Rainfall is between 151 and 376 millimetres (5.9 and 14.8 in) and varies between wet and dry seasons. The humidity level sits between 83 and 87%.

== Governance ==
=== Administrative districts ===
At the time of the 2010 census, the regency was divided into three districts. Two additional districts—Muruk Rian and Batayau—have since been created by splitting them off from the Sesayap and the Sesayap Hilir Districts respectively. The five districts are tabulated below with their areas and their populations recorded in the 2010 census and the 2020 census, together with the official estimates as at mid 2024. The regency seat, the town of Tideng Pale, is located in the Sesayap District. The table also includes the locations of the district administrative centres, the number of villages (all classed as rural desa) in each district, and its postal code.

Kode Wilayah	Name of District (kecamatan)	Area in km^{2}	Pop'n census 2010	Pop'n census 2020	Pop'n Estimate mid 2024	Admin centre	No. of villages	Post code
65.04.05	Muruk Rian	439.58	^{(a)}	1,483	1,911	Rian	6	77154
65.04.01	Sesayap	393.92	8,505	10,489	12,364	Tideng Pale	7	77151
65.04.04	Betayau	578.22	^{(b)}	2,834	3,966	Bebakung	6	77152
65.04.02	Sesayap Hilir	1,878.69	4,563	7,441	8,230	Sesayap	8	77153
65.04.03	Tana Lia	767.90	2,134	3,337	3,565	Tanah Merah	5	77451
	Totals	3,858.31	15,202	25,584	30,036	Tideng Pale	32	

Notes: (a) The 2010 population of the new Muruk Rian District is included in the figure for Sesayap District.
(b) The 2010 population of the new Betayau District is included in the figure for Sesayap Hilir District.

=== Local government and politics ===
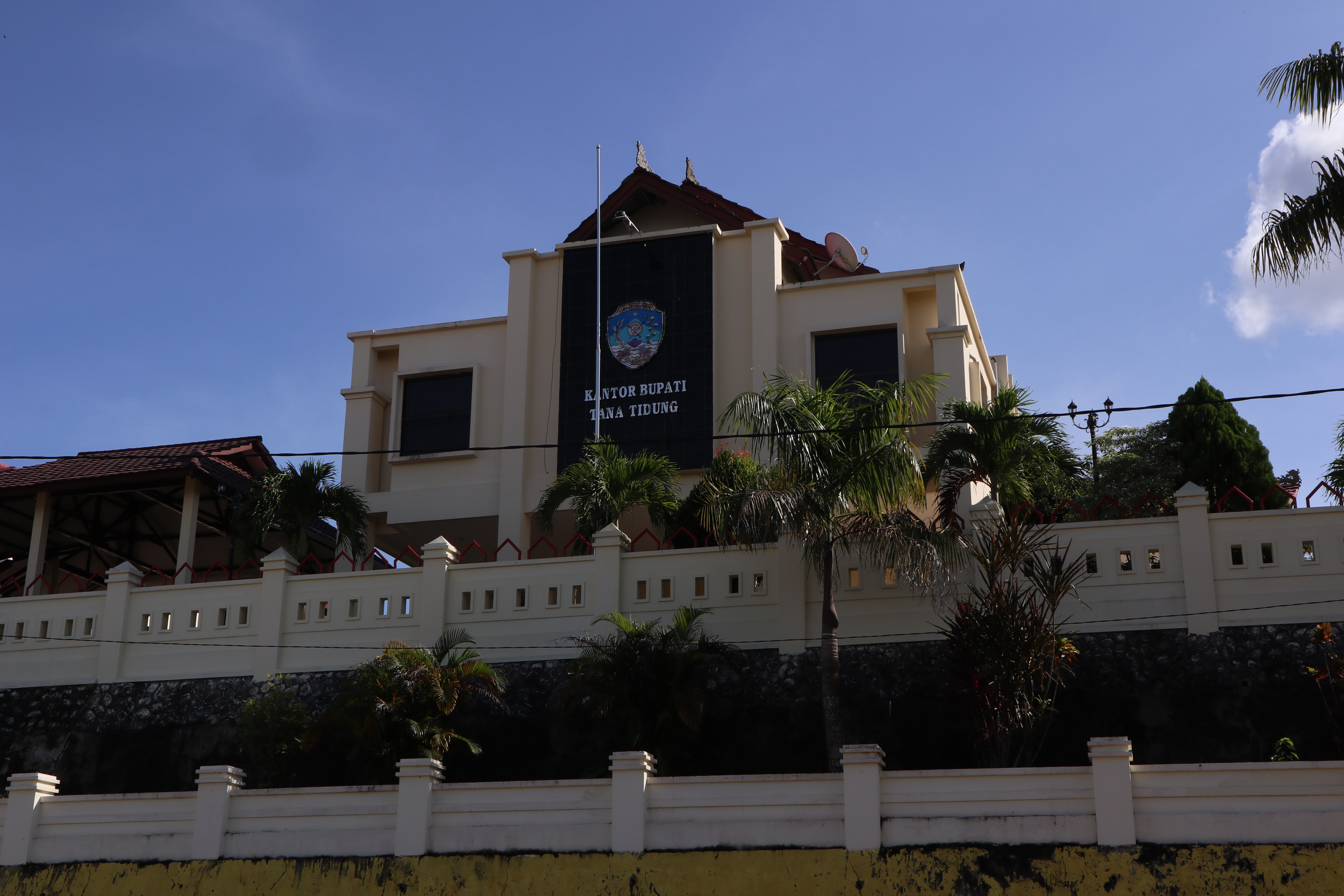
Office building of Tana Tidung Regent

The Tana Tidung Regency is a second-level administrative division equivalent to a city. As a regency, it is headed by a regent who is elected democratically. Heads of districts are appointed directly by the regent on the recommendation of the regency secretary. Executive power lies with the regent and vice regent while legislative function is exercised by the regency's parliament.

As of 2022, the regent of Tana Tidung is Ibrahim Ali, who was elected during the 2020 Indonesian local elections. There have been only two elected regents so far, with its first regent Undunsyah elected for two terms in 2010 and 2015.

The regency is part of the 2nd North Kalimantan electoral district which has nine of the 35 representatives on the provincial parliament. On a local level, the regency is divided into two electoral districts that have a total of 20 representatives. The last election was in 2019; the next one is to be held in 2024. The first electoral district consist of three districts; Sesayap, Betayau, and Muruk Rian which together have 12 representatives on the regency parliament. The second electoral district consist of two districts, Sesayap Hilir and Tana Lia, which together have 8 representatives.

Electoral district	Region	Representatives
Tana Tidung 1st	Sesayap, Betayau & Muruk Rian District	12
Tana Tidung 2nd	Sesayap Hilir & Tana Lia District	8
Total		20

== Economy ==
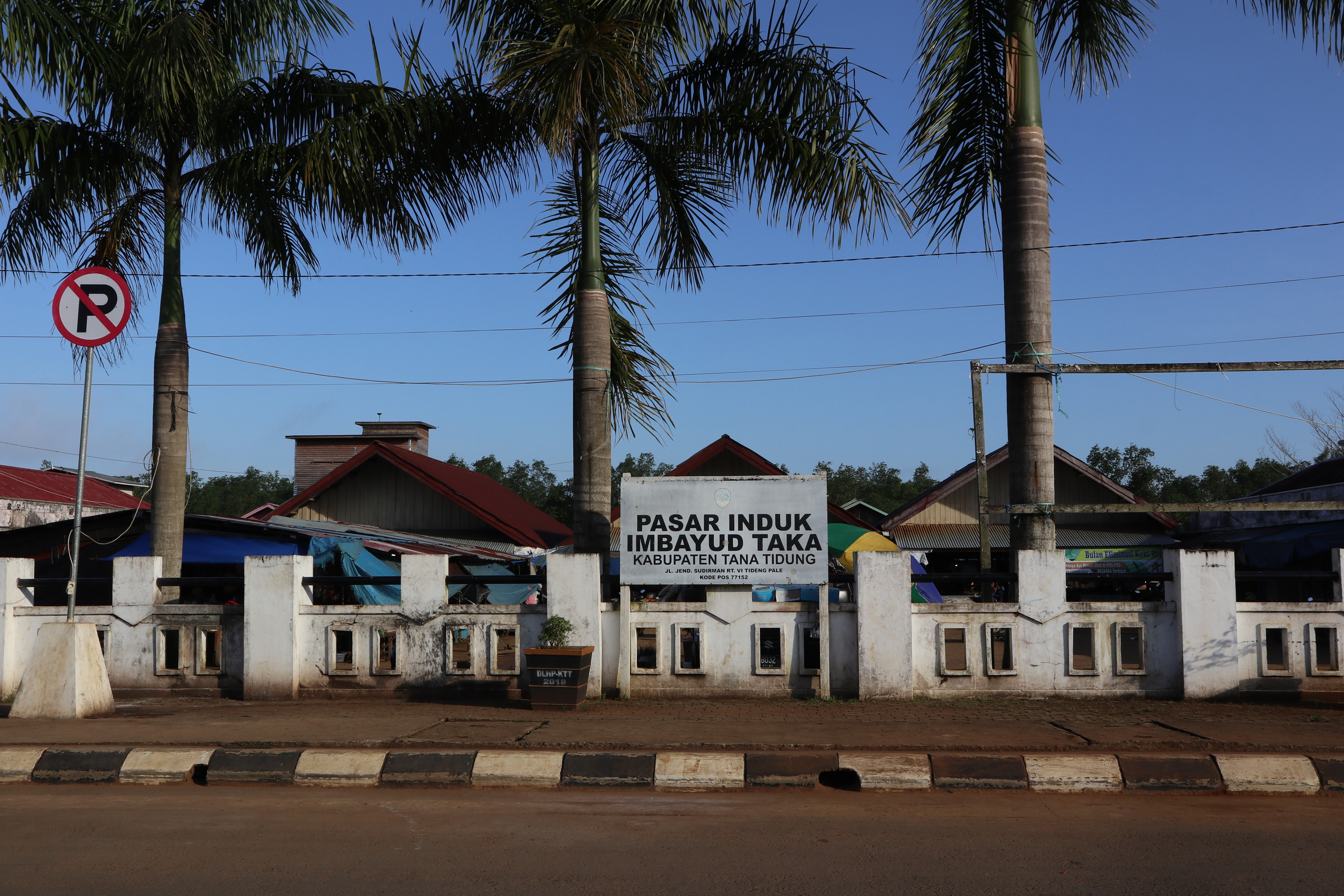
Main wet market building of the Tana Tidung Regency

The regency's economy is dominated by agriculture, which is responsible for 31.40% of its gross regional product as of 2020. The second biggest sector is mining, producing 29.45% of the gross regional product. Another significant sector is construction and administration services, with contributions of 17.79% and 10.54% gross regional product, respectively. The fastest growing sector in 2020 was electricity and gas with a 12.47% increase, while mining showed a sharp decline of 5.03% in the same year.

Agricultural output in the regency on 2020 included 74.5 tons of chili, 46.9 tons of water spinach, 33.1 tons of tomatoes, and 33.1 tons of eggplant. The regency also produced 364 tons of chicken, 10.9 tons of beef, and 2 tons of pork in the same year. The total weight of fish captured in 2020 was 880.814 tons from both inland freshwater and the sea. There are 119 registered restaurants, 11 hotels, and 27 active cooperatives.

The regency has five registered market sites. However, most of the trading is done in small shops called warung where most of regency's trade occurs. There are 342 registered warungs in the regency. As of 2020, there were 79 legally registered companies operating in the regency. Economic growth was 4.33% over 2019, but later plummeted to −0.74% during the COVID-19 pandemic. The poverty rate was 5.71% in 2020—the lowest in the province.

== Demographics ==
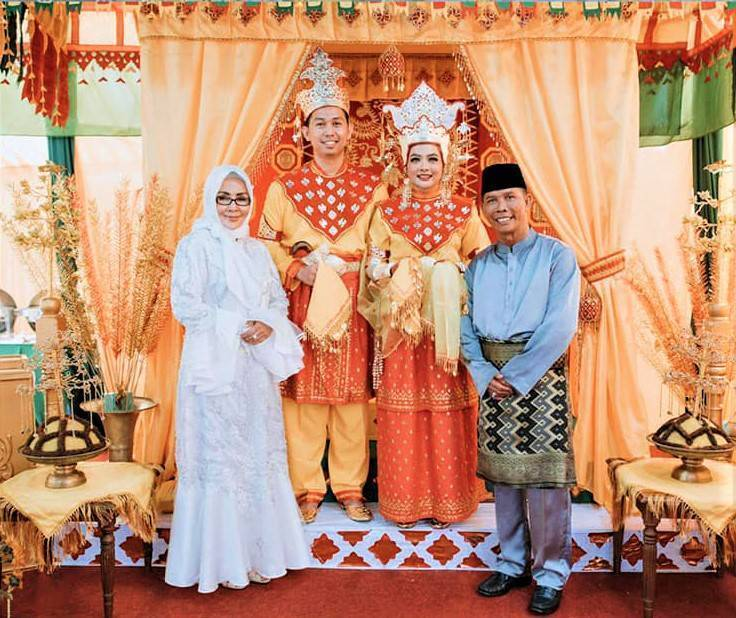
Traditional marriage attire of Tidung people. Most of the Regency's population are Tidung people.

As with most regencies in Indonesia, the population of Tana Tidung is young and dominated by a reproductive population above age 15. According to Statistics Indonesia, 14,181 people in the regency are considered to be working age as of 2020. The regency population is concentrated in the town of Tideng Pale in Sesayap, with 41% of the regency population living in Sesayap District. Sesayap District is the most densely populated district in the regency. Tana Tidung is the least populated regency in the entire country. Population growth was 5.17% in 2020 and the sex ratio was 1.15 or 115 males for every 100 females in the population.

A majority of the population, 75.75%, is Muslim, followed by Protestants with 14.91%, Catholics with 9.11%, Buddhist 0.12%, Hindu 0.01%, and followers of Confucianism with 0.01%. There are also followers of original Indonesian folk religions, about 9.98% of the population. A majority of the population in the regency is Tidung people, with the minorities including Dayaks, Malays, and Buginese migrants.

== Infrastructure ==
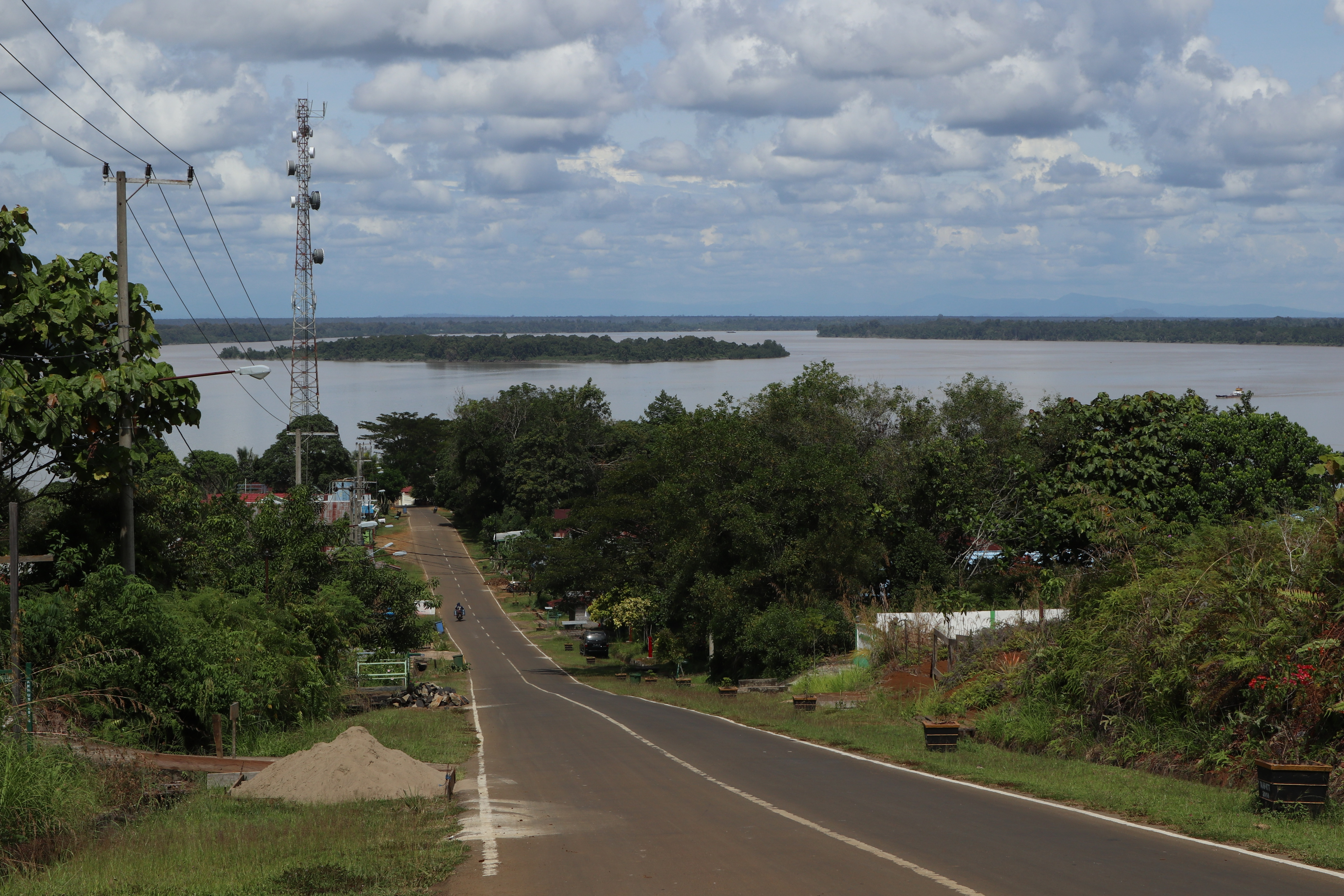
A road connecting the town of Tideng Pale and Sungai Sesayap

In 2020, there were nine kindergartens, 30 elementary schools, 11 junior high schools, three senior high schools, one vocational high school, and one special education school. The literacy rate was 94.65% in 2020. As of 2021, there are no tertiary education institutions in the regency. There is one hospital, 36 healthcare centers, 22 puskesmas (community health clinics), and three pharmacies in 2020. The only hospital, Akhmad Berahim Regional Hospital, is a public hospital owned by the regency government. It is in Tideng Pale, Sesayap District, and classified as a C-class hospital by the Ministry of Health. It underwent an expansion and new building construction in 2019. There are 62 mosques, 28 Protestant churches, seven Catholic churches, and one Balinese temple. The regency government provided free internet using WiFi hotspots in public spaces and parks coordinating with the Ministry of Communication and Information.

The regency has a total of 324.37 kilometres (201.55 mi) of road, of which 166.17 kilometres (103.25 mi) have been paved with asphalt. There is no airport in the regency, and the main form of transportation is by bus. Perum DAMRI serves a regular subsidized route to Tanjung Selor. Another means of transportation is speed boat from Tideng Pale Port, which has regular routes to the city of Tarakan. In 2020, the port underwent an expansion to increase the capacity for passengers.
