= Kalimantan =

Region of Indonesia in Borneo Island

- Region
- Location of Kalimantan (Indonesia) in Borneo Island
- Coordinates: 1°S 114°E
- Country: Indonesia
- Province: West Kalimantan (Pontianak); Central Kalimantan (Palangkaraya); South Kalimantan (Banjarbaru); East Kalimantan (Samarinda); North Kalimantan (Tanjung Selor)
- Largest cities: Samarinda; Balikpapan; Pontianak; Banjarmasin; Palangkaraya; Nusantara; Banjarbaru; Tarakan; Singkawang; Bontang
- Other towns: Tanjung Selor

Population (mid 2023 estimate)
  - Total: 17,259,155
- ISO 3166 code: ID-KA
- Vehicle sign: DA; KB; KH; KT; KU
- HDI: ▲0.708 (High)

Kalimantan (Indonesian pronunciation: [kaliˈmantan]) is the Indonesian portion of the island of Borneo. It constitutes 73% of the island's area, and consists of the provinces of Central Kalimantan, East Kalimantan, North Kalimantan, South Kalimantan, and West Kalimantan. The non-Indonesian parts of Borneo are Brunei and East Malaysia. In Indonesia the whole island of Borneo is also called "Kalimantan".

In 2019, President of Indonesia Joko Widodo proposed that Indonesia's capital be moved to Kalimantan. The People's Consultative Assembly approved the Law on State Capital in January 2022. The future capital, Nusantara, is a planned city that will be carved out of East Kalimantan. A government official said construction is expected to be fully complete by 2045, but the unfinished capital officially celebrated Indonesian Independence Day for the first time and it was scheduled to be inaugurated as the capital city on 17 August 2024, but the move did not take place due to delays of construction.

== Etymology ==
The name Kalimantan is derived from the Sanskrit word Kalamanthana, which means "burning weather island" or "very hot island", referring to its hot and humid tropical climate. It consists of the two words kal[a] ("time, season, period") and manthan[a] ("boiling, churning, burning"). The native people of Indonesian Borneo referred to their island as Pulu K'lemantan or "Kalimantan" when the sixteenth century Portuguese explorer Jorge de Menezes made contact with them. Due to Europeans encountering the Bruneian Sultanate in the north part of the island during the Age of Exploration, the entire island has come to be called Borneo in English, with Kalimantan being known as Indonesian Borneo, but this name is not used in Indonesia itself.

In the early twentieth century, the British colonist Charles Hose described Kalimantan as being home to a "Klemantan people", but this term is no longer in use as Kalimantan has always had many ethnic groups.

== Area ==
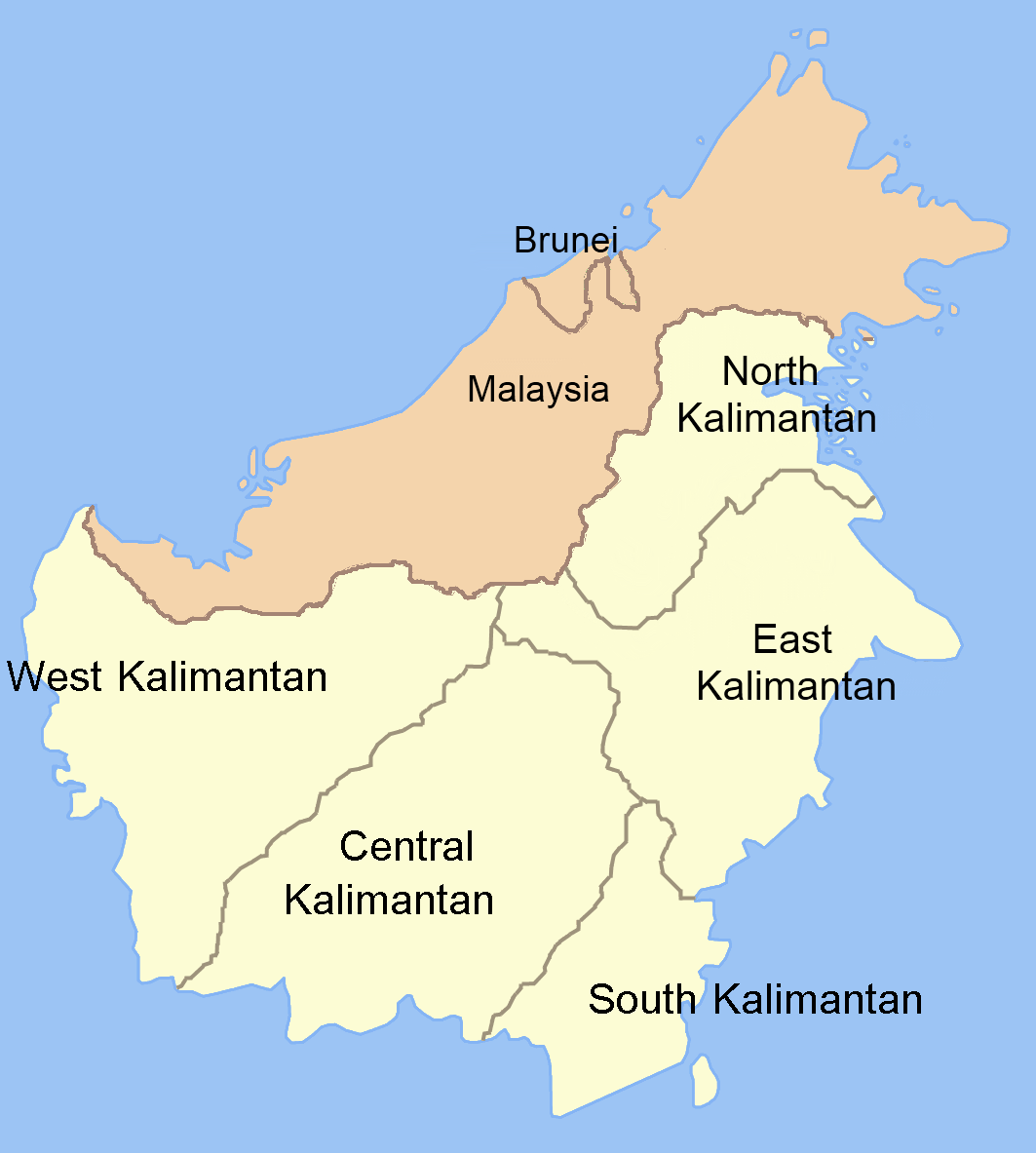
Map of Kalimantan (light colour) and its component provinces.

The Indonesian territory makes up 73% of the island by area, and 72.1% of its 2020 population of 23,053,723 (the population was 13,772,543 at the 2010 Census of Indonesia, and 16,625,796 at the 2020 Census). The non-Indonesian parts of Borneo are of Brunei (460,345 in 2020) and East Malaysia (5,967,582 in 2020), the latter comprising the states of Sabah (3,418,785) and Sarawak (2,453,677), and the federal territory of Labuan (95,120).

Kalimantan's total area is 534,698.27 square kilometres (206,448 sq mi).

The widespread deforestation and other environmental destruction in Kalimantan and other parts of Indonesia has often been described by academics as an ecocide.

== Administrative divisions ==
Kalimantan is now divided into five provinces. It was administered as one province between 1945 and 1956, but in 1956 it was split into three provinces – East Kalimantan, South Kalimantan and West Kalimantan; then in 1957, the province of Central Kalimantan was created when it was split away from the existing South Kalimantan. There remained four provinces until 25 October 2012, when North Kalimantan was split off from East Kalimantan. These are listed below with their areas in km^{2} and their populations at the 2010 and 2020 Censuses, together with the official estimates as at mid 2023.

Provinces of Kalimantan
| Province | Area (km^{2}) | Pop'n (2010 Census) | Pop'n (2015 Interim Census) | Pop'n (2020 Census) | Pop'n mid-2023 estimate | Density per km^{2} (2023) | Provin- cial capital | Largest metropolitan area |
|---|---|---|---|---|---|---|---|---|
| West Kalimantan | 147,037.04 | 4,395,983 | 4,783,209 | 5,396,821 | 5,623,328 | 38.2 | Pontianak | |
| Central Kalimantan | 153,443.90 | 2,202,599 | 2,490,178 | 2,669,969 | 2,773,747 | 18.1 | Palangkaraya | |
| South Kalimantan | 37,135.05 | 3,626,119 | 3,984,315 | 4,062,584 | 4,222,330 | 113.7 | Banjarbaru | Banjarmasin |
| East Kalimantan | 126,981.28 | 3,550,586 | 3,422,676* | 3,766,039 | 3,909,740 | 30.8 | Samarinda | Nusantara |
| North Kalimantan | 70,101.00 | 524,526 | 639,639 | 701,814 | 730,010 | 10.4 | Tanjung Selor | Tarakan |
| Total | 534,698.27 | 14,299,813 | 15,320,017 | 16,597,227 | 17,259,155 | 32.3 | – | Nusantara |

^{* excluding North Kalimantan, split off from East Kalimantan with resulting population and area loss for the 2015 census.}

== Demographics ==
Historical population
| Year | Pop. | ±% |
|---|---|---|
| 1971 | 5,154,774 | — |
| 1980 | 6,723,086 | +30.4% |
| 1990 | 9,099,874 | +35.4% |
| 1995 | 10,470,843 | +15.1% |
| 2000 | 11,331,558 | +8.2% |
| 2005 | 12,541,554 | +10.7% |
| 2010 | 14,299,813 | +14.0% |
| 2015 | 15,320,017 | +7.1% |
| 2020 | 16,597,227 | +8.3% |
| 2023 | 17,259,155 | +4.0% |
Sources: Statistics Indonesia

=== Ethnic groups ===
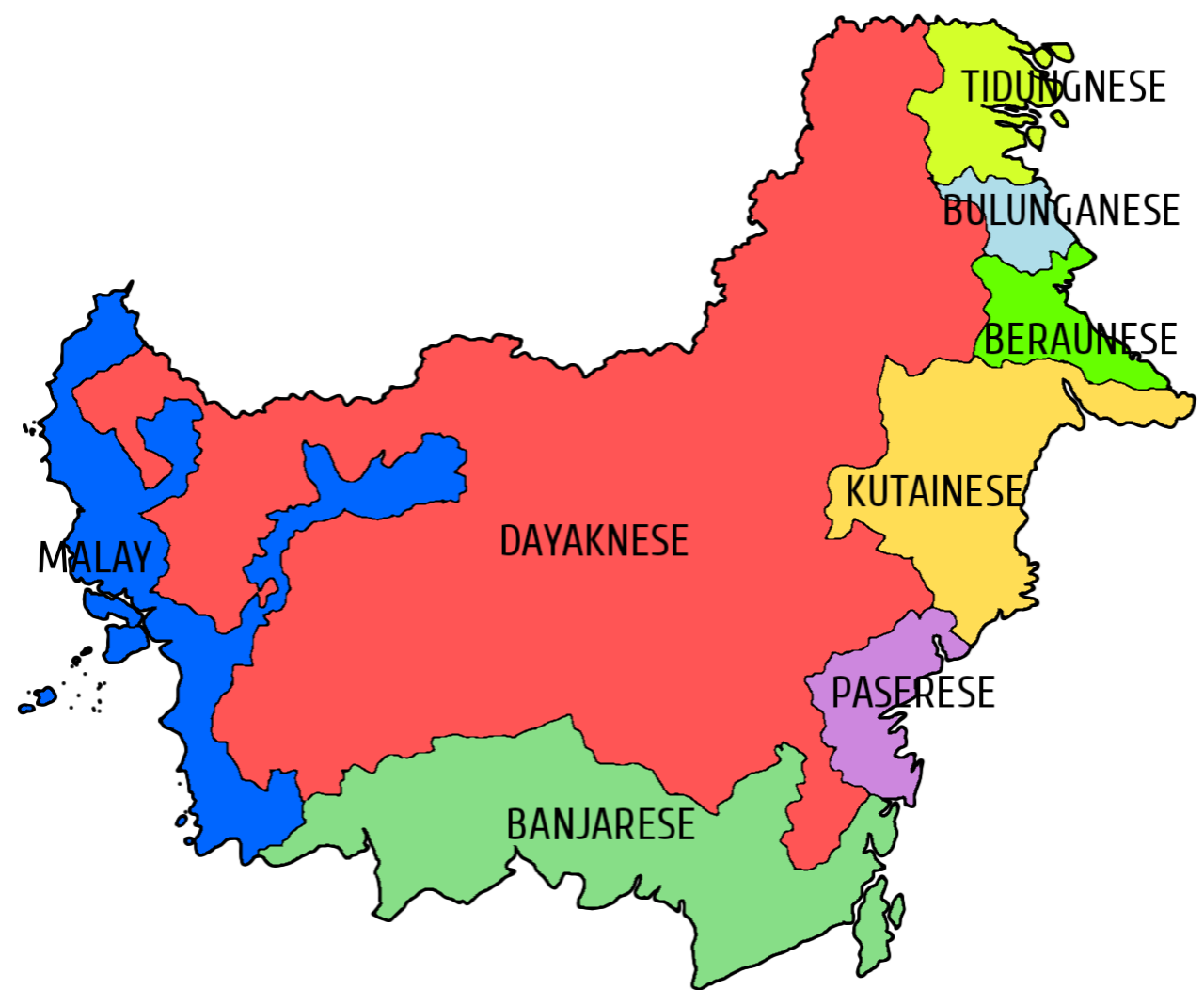
Distribution of indigenous ethnic groups in Kalimantan.

Number of the largest population of ethnic groups according to the 2010 census:

| Ethnicity | West Kalimantan | Central Kalimantan | South Kalimantan | North and East Kalimantan | Total |
|---|---|---|---|---|---|
| Banjarese | 14,430 (0.33%) | 464,260 (21.28%) | 2,686,627 (74.84%) | 440,453 (12.45%) | 3,605,770 (26.31%) |
| Dayaks | 1,531,989 (34.93%) | 1,029,182 (46.62%) | 80,708 (2.23%) | 351,437 (9.94%) | 2,993,316 (21.78%) |
| Javanese | 427,238 (9.74%) | 478,393 (21.67%) | 523,276 (14.51%) | 1,069,605 (30.24%) | 2,498,512 (18.18%) |
| Malays | 1,484,085 (33.84%) | 87,348 (3.96%) | 3,681 (0.10%) | 6,053 (0.17%) | 1,581,167 (11.51%) |
| Buginese | 137,282 (3.13%) | 17,104 (0.77%) | 101,727 (2.81%) | 735,819 (20.81%) | 991,932 (7.22%) |
| Madurese | 274,869 (6.27%) | 42,668 (1.93%) | 53,002 (1.47%) | 46,823 (1.32%) | 417,362 (3.04%) |
| Chinese | 358,451 (8.17%) | 5,130 (0.23%) | 13,000 (0.36%) | 32,757 (0.93%) | 409,338 (2.98%) |
| Kutainese | None | None | None | 275,696 (7.80%) | 275,696 (2.01%) |
| Sundanese | 49,530 (1.13%) | 28,580 (1.29%) | 24,592 (0.68%) | 55,659 (1.57%) | 158,361 (1.15%) |
| Bataks | 26,486 (0.60%) | 12,324 (0.56%) | 12,408 (0.34%) | 37,145 (1.05%) | 88,363 (0.64%) |
| Others | 80,996 (1.85%) | 42,378 (1.92%) | 114,971 (3.18%) | 485,056 (13.72%) | 723,401 (5.26%) |
| Total | 4,385,356 (100%) | 2,207,367 (100%) | 3,613,992 (100%) | 3,536,503 (100%) | 13,743,218 (100%) |

=== Religion ===
Number of the largest population of religious groups according to the 2010 census:

| Religion | West Kalimantan | Central Kalimantan | South Kalimantan | North Kalimantan | East Kalimantan | Total |
|---|---|---|---|---|---|---|
| Islam | 2,603,318 (59.22%) | 1,643,715 (74.31%) | 3,505,846 (96.67%) | 378,478 (72.14%) | 2,655,227 (87.68%) | 10,786,584 (78.23%) |
| Protestantism | 500,254 (11.38%) | 353,353 (15.97%) | 47,974 (1.32%) | 109,358 (20.84%) | 228,022 (7.53%) | 1,238,961 (8.99%) |
| Roman Catholic | 1,008,368 (22.94%) | 58,279 (2.63%) | 16,045 (0.44%) | 29,366 (5.60%) | 109,263 (3.61%) | 1,221,321 (8.86%) |
| Hinduism | 2,708 (0.06%) | 11,149 (0.50%) | 16,064 (0.44%) | 288 (0.05%) | 7,369 (0.24%) | 37,578 (0.27%) |
| Buddhism | 237,741 (5.41%) | 2,301 (0.10%) | 11,675 (0.32%) | 3,879 (0.74%) | 12,477 (0.41%) | 268,073 (1.94%) |
| Confucianism | 29,737 (0.68%) | 414 (0.02%) | 236 (0.01%) | 175 (0.03%) | 905 (0.03%) | 31,467 (0.23%) |
| Other religions | 2,907 (0.07%) | 138,419 (6.26%) | 16,465 (0.45%) | 25 (0.00%) | 824 (0.03%) | 158,640 (1.35%) |
| Not Stated | 671 (0.01%) | 220 (0.01%) | 3 (0.00%) | 454 (0.09%) | 1,497 (0.05%) | 2,845 (0.02%) |
| Not Asked | 10,279 (0.23%) | 4,239 (0.19%) | 12,308 (0.34%) | 2,633 (0.50%) | 12,903 (0.43%) | 42,362 (0.31%) |
| Total | 4,395,983 (100%) | 2,212,089 (100%) | 3,626,616 (100%) | 524,656 (100%) | 3,028,487 (100%) | 13,787,831 (100%) |

Religion in Kalimantan (2023)
1. Islam (78.4%)
2. Protestantism (9.30%)
3. Roman Catholic (9.09%)
4. Buddhism (1.94%)
5. Hinduism (1.08%)
6. Confucianism (0.10%)
7. Folk religion and others (0.06%)

Number of the largest population of religious groups in 2023:

| Religions | Total |
|---|---|
| Islam | 13,566,483 |
| Protestant | 1,608,857 |
| Roman Catholic | 1,573,067 |
| Buddhism | 335,722 |
| Hinduism | 187,035 |
| Confucianism | 17,376 |
| Aliran Kepercayaan | 11,151 |
| Overall | 17,299,691 |

== See also ==
- List of rivers of Kalimantan
- Languages of Kalimantan
