= Tanjung Selor =

Capital district of North Kalimantan, Indonesia

- Town
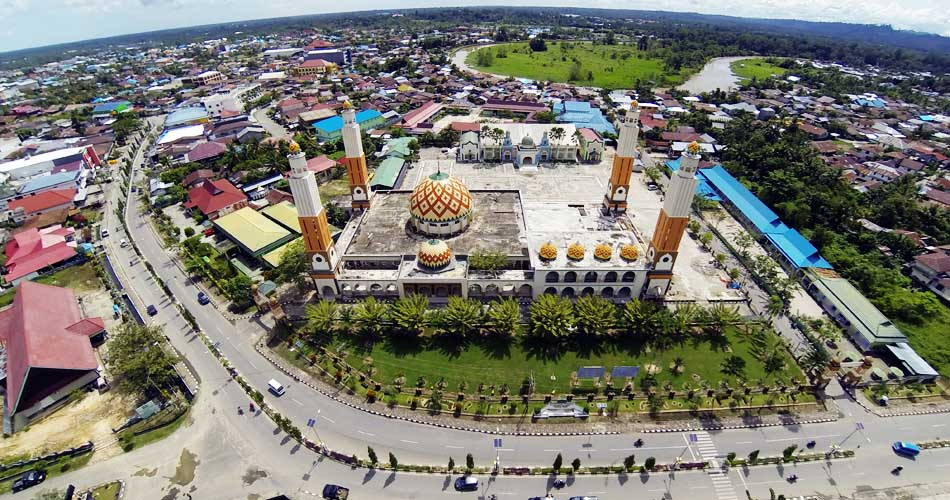
- A view of Tanjung Selor, showing the Istiqomah Grand Mosque

- Location in Kalimantan and Indonesia Tanjung Selor (Indonesia)
- Coordinates: 2°51′0″N 117°23′0″E
- Country: Indonesia
- Province: North Kalimantan
- Regency: Bulungan
- Founded: 12 October 1790; 15 August 2002 (as district proper)

Area
  - Total: 677.77 km^{2} (261.69 sq mi)
- Elevation: 24 m (79 ft)

Population (mid 2025 estimate)
  - Total: 67,837
  - Density: 100.09/km^{2} (259.23/sq mi)
- Time zone: UTC+8 (Indonesia Central Time)
- Area code: (+62) 553

Tanjung Selor is a town and an administrative district (kecamatan) which serves as the capital of both the North Kalimantan province in Indonesia, and of the Bulungan Regency. It is among those provincial capitals in Indonesia that as of 2025 does not yet have city status, together with Mamuju in West Sulawesi, Sofifi in North Maluku, Nabire in Central Papua, Wamena in Highland Papua, Salor in South Papua, and Manokwari in West Papua. The district has an area of 677.77 km^{2} according to the regency official statistics (although the area is 1,207.13 km^{2} according to the district official statistics). It had a population of 39,439 at the 2010 Census and 56,569 at the 2020 Census; the official estimate as at mid 2025 was 67,837.

Tanjung Selor District was formally established as an administrative district (kecamatan) within Bulungan Regency, after being separated from Tanjung Palas District, on 15 August 2002.

== History ==
Tanjung Selor was a small market town under the Sultanate of Bulungan, which later became the subject of the Dutch East Indies. After the Indonesian National Revolution, it became part of the Swapraja (Autonomous Royal Region) of Bulungan following Decree No. 186/ORB/ 92/14/1950 from the then-Kalimantan province governor. This later changed again into the Special Region of Bulungan under Law No. 22 of 1955. In 1959, the sultanate was abolished and became a second-level administrative region, now called a regency.

Tanjung Selor was split from Tanjung Palas District, based on Bulungan Regency Law No. 13 of 2002, together with other seven new districts after the decentralization. Before the creation of the new North Kalimantan province split from East Kalimantan, it was determined to locate the provincial capital on mainland Kalimantan rather than in the then-largest urban body of Tarakan, which is an island. As such, Tanjung Selor is among few Indonesian provincial capitals to be created from scratch, along with Sofifi and Palangka Raya. However, for financial reasons a moratorium under President Joko Widodo on creating second-level administrations so far has prevented granting Tanjung Selor city status, since the town itself solely consists of its own district. As of 2025, North Kalimantan remains among the few Indonesian provinces with its capital not having city status.

== Geography ==
The district is mostly a flat, low-lying region with hills whose height varies from 0 to 500 meters above sea level. The district borders Central Tanjung Palas District in the north, East Tanjung Palas District in the east and the south, and Kayan river in the west. Soil in the district is acidic, with a pH range between 4 and 6. Another river, the Selor, also runs through the district. The district of Tanjung Selor shares a border to the south with Segah in Berau Regency, East Kalimantan Province.

=== Administration ===
Tanjung Selor District is composed of nine villages, of which three (those asterisked in the table below) have the status of urban kelurahan and six have the status of rural desa.

Kode Wilayah	Name of kelurahan or desa	Area in km^{2}	Pop'n Estimate mid 2024	Post code
65.01.05.1001	Tanjung Selor Hulu *	204.33	5,985	77211
65.01.05.1002	Tanjung Selor Hilir *	19.13	35,365	77212
65.01.05.2003	Jelarai Selor	199.35	7,855	77212
65.01.05.2004	Gunung Seriang	226.26	1,094	77212
65.01.05.2005	Bumi Rahayu	99.67	1,832	77212
65.01.05.2006	Gunung Sari	220.89	1,995	77212
65.01.05.2007	Apung	92.00	3,581	77212
65.01.05.1008	Tanjung Selor Timur *	22.50	6,867	77212
65.01.05.2009	Tengkapak	127.00	1,236	77212
	Totals	1,207.13	65,810	

=== Climate ===
Tanjung Selor has a tropical rainforest climate (Köppen Af) with heavy rainfall year-round.

Climate data for Tanjung Selor (Tanjung Harapan Airport) (1991–2020 normals, extremes 2005–2023)
Month	Jan	Feb	Mar	Apr	May	Jun	Jul	Aug	Sep	Oct	Nov	Dec	Year
Mean daily maximum °C (°F)	31.3 (88.3)	31.6 (88.9)	31.7 (89.1)	32.5 (90.5)	33.0 (91.4)	33.0 (91.4)	32.8 (91.0)	33.3 (91.9)	33.2 (91.8)	32.9 (91.2)	32.5 (90.5)	32.0 (89.6)	32.5 (90.5)
Daily mean °C (°F)	26.8 (80.2)	27.1 (80.8)	27.3 (81.1)	27.7 (81.9)	28.1 (82.6)	27.8 (82.0)	27.6 (81.7)	27.9 (82.2)	27.8 (82.0)	27.8 (82.0)	27.5 (81.5)	27.3 (81.1)	27.6 (81.6)
Mean daily minimum °C (°F)	23.8 (74.8)	23.9 (75.0)	24.0 (75.2)	24.2 (75.6)	24.5 (76.1)	24.1 (75.4)	23.9 (75.0)	24.0 (75.2)	24.0 (75.2)	24.1 (75.4)	24.2 (75.6)	24.0 (75.2)	24.1 (75.3)
Average precipitation mm (inches)	285.6 (11.24)	283.7 (11.17)	326.6 (12.86)	224.8 (8.85)	251.5 (9.90)	230.2 (9.06)	205.3 (8.08)	227.2 (8.94)	227.5 (8.96)	262.3 (10.33)	256.7 (10.11)	306.9 (12.08)	3,088.3 (121.59)
Average precipitation days (≥ 1.0 mm)	20.3	18.9	20.2	17.4	19.4	17.2	16.3	16.5	16.3	17.7	17.8	20.2	218.2
Mean monthly sunshine hours	92.8	101.0	115.8	138.1	141.2	123.6	134.3	141.8	112.4	113.4	96.4	93.0	1,403.8
Source 1: Starlings Roost Weather
Source 2: World Meteorological Organization

== Economy ==
Agricultural land use includes chilis, tomatoes, ginger, galangal, and turmeric. Chili production was 337 tons in 2019, with 295 tons of tomatoes, 57 tons of ginger, 52 tons of galangal, and four tons of turmeric. The district also includes plantation sectors which produce mangoes, citrus, durian, and bananas. There are 68 registered restaurants in the district as of 2019 and 12 convenience stores. There also are 11 hotels as of 2019. Twelve banks operate in the district, of which nine are branches of state-owned banks, two are private banks, and one, the People's Credit Bank, is a municipally owned BPR. There also are 45 registered cooperatives.

== Governance ==
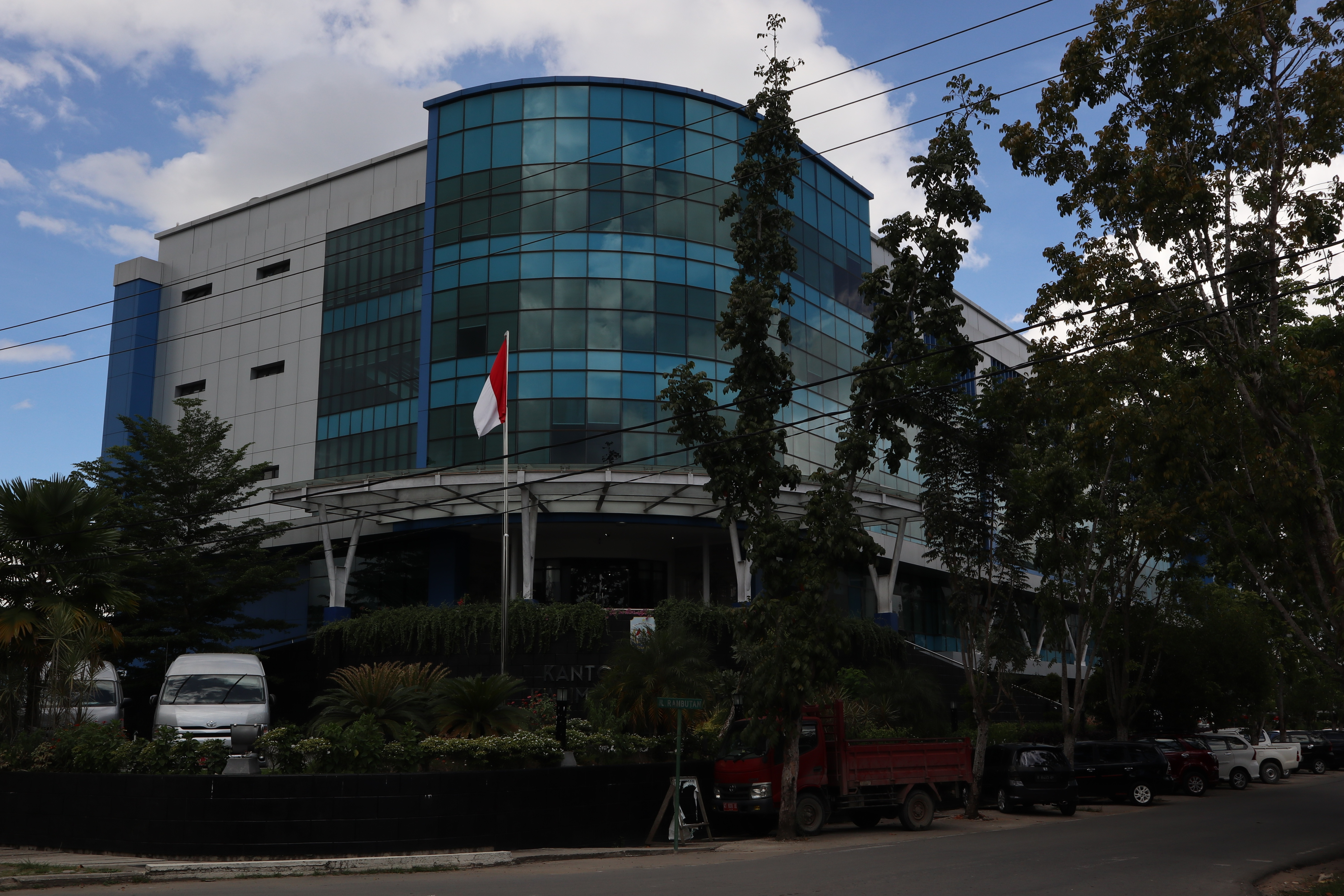
The old office building of North Kalimantan governor. Tanjung Selor is one of only four provincial capitals that does not have city status.

As an administrative district, it is a third-level administrative entity under a regency. A district head (camat) is appointed directly by the regent with recommendation from the regency secretary. Tanjung Selor itself has no parliament. The district is divided into nine villages, of which three have the status of urban villages (kelurahan), and six are classed as rural villages (desa).

- Gunung Seriang
- Tanjung Selor Hulu
- Jelarai Selor
- Gunung Sari
- Bumi Rahayu
- Apung
- Tengkapak
- East Tanjung Selor
- Tanjung Selor Hilir

At the regency level, the district, together with East Tanjung Palas, is part of the Bulungan first electoral district, which sends 11 representatives to the regency-level parliament. The latest election was in 2019, and the next is expected in 2024.

== Infrastructure ==
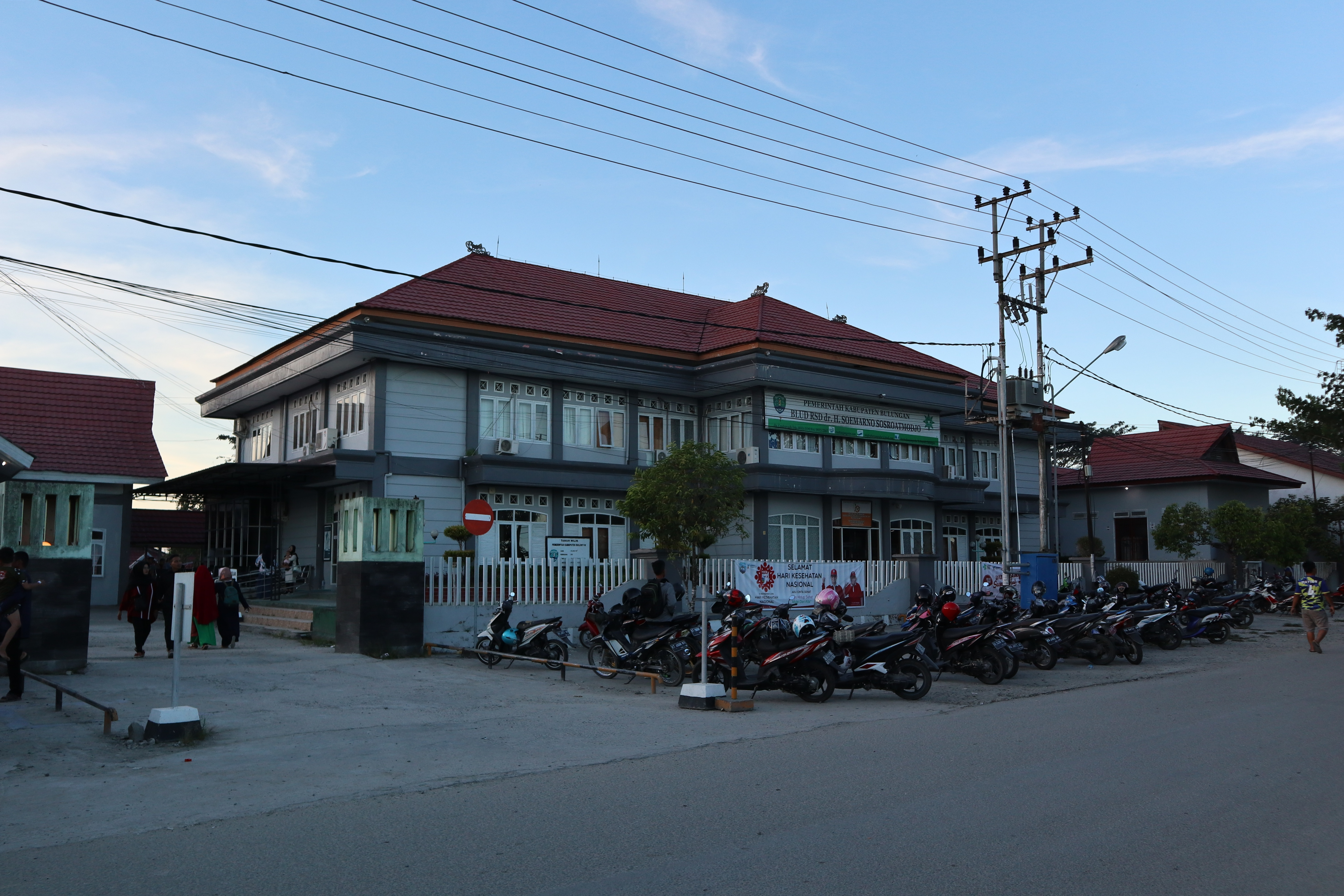
Dr. H. Soemarno Sosroatmodjo Regional Hospital, the only operational hospital in the district as of 2019

The district is served by the Tanjung Harapan Airport. All roads in the district are asphalt-paved and in good condition as of 2020, according to Statistics Indonesia. As of 2019, the district has 35 elementary schools, 19 junior high schools, 10 senior high schools, three vocational high schools, and three higher education institutions. There is also one hospital, 11 puskesmas government health clinics, three additional clinics, seven healthcare centers, and 17 pharmacies. Most of the district is reached by 4G wireless signal and basic telecommunication services. The district's hospital, Dr. H. Soemarno Sosroatmojo Regional Hospital, is a public hospital owned by the regency government; built in 1984, it is classified as a C-class hospital by the Ministry of Health.
