= Sultanate of Bulungan =

1731–1959 state in Southeast Asia

Sultanate of Bulungan کسلطانن بولوڠن Kesultanan Bulungan
- 1731–1959
- 19th century flag Coat of arms

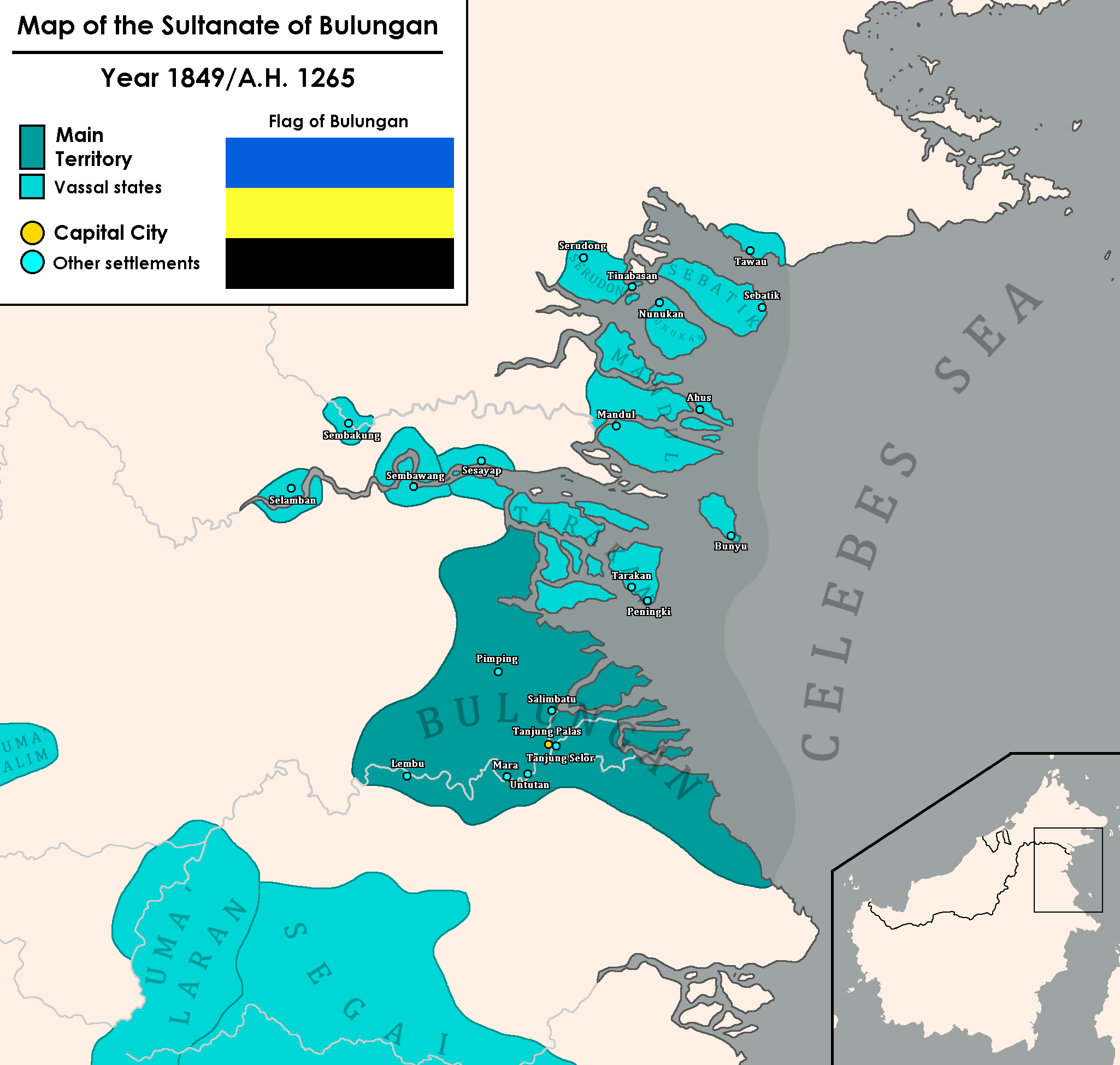
- Map of the Sultanate of Bulungan (colored dark teal) and its vassals (light teal) in 1849.
- Status: Vassal of the Sultanate of Berau (1731–1789); Vassal of the Sultanate of Sulu (1789–1855); Protectorate of the Dutch East Indies (1834–1878); Part of the Dutch East Indies (from 1878–1949); Autonomous territory of Indonesia (1949–1950); Special territory of Indonesia (1955–1959)
- Capital: Busang Arau (1555–1695); Limbu (1695–1731); Salim Batu (1731–1777); Tanjung Palas (1777–1928, 1933–1959); Tarakan (1928–1933)
- Common languages: Bulungan, Malay, Kayan, Tidung, and Tausug
- Religion: Sunni Islam
- Government: Monarchy
- Sultan
  - 1731–1777: Wira Amir
  - 1777–1817: Aji Ali
  - 1817–1861, 1866–1873: Aji Muhammad
  - 1901–1925: Datuk Belembung
  - 1931–1958: Datuk Tiras
- History
  - Sultanate established: 1731
  - Vassal of the Sultanate of Sulu: 1789
  - Dutch protectorate: 1834
  - Independence from Sulu: 1855
  - Annexation into the Dutch East Indies: 1878
  - Conversion into a regency: 1959
Preceded by
| Sultanate of Berau |
| Sultanate of Sulu |
Succeeded by
| Dutch East Indies |
| North Borneo |
| Bulungan Regency |
- Today part of: Indonesia; Malaysia

The Sultanate of Bulungan (Jawi: کسلطانن بولوڠن, Indonesian: Kesultanan Bulungan) was a former independent sultanate and later a special territory of Indonesia located in the then existing Bulungan Regency (at that time covering all the territory that now comprises the North Kalimantan province of Indonesia) in the east of the island of Borneo. Its territory spanned the eastern shores of North Kalimantan and Tawau, Malaysia.

== Etymology ==
The name "Bulungan" came from the Bulungan words bulu tengon, which means 'real bamboo'. It then changed to "Bulungan". The importance of the bamboo in the Bulungan identity stems from a boy born out of the bamboo named Jauwiru. From Jauwiru's descendants, the Bulungan Sultanate was born. After Kuwanyi died, Jauwiru replaced the position as the leader of the Dayak Hupan.

== History ==
=== Origin according to oral history ===
Bulungan was founded by a Kayan group, the Uma Apan, also known as the Dayak Hupan, who originated from the interior region of Apo Kayan (Kayan Highland Plateau), before settling near the coast in the 16th or 17th century. According to a local legend, Kuwanyi was the leader of the Dayak Hupan, which was a small ethnic group with a village of only 80 people on the banks of the Payang River, a branch of the Pujungan River. Due to the poor quality of life on the region, they moved downstream of a large river called the Kayan.

One day Kuwanyi went hunting in the forest, but he did not catch a single animal, except for a large bamboo called bamboo betung and an egg that lay on a Jemlay tree stump. He brought the bamboo and the egg home. A boy emerged from the bamboo and when the egg was broken a girl also emerged. These two children were considered gifts from the gods. Kuwanyi and his wife raised the children well until they were adults. When both of them were adults, they were each given the name Jauwiru for the boy and Lemlai Suri for the girl. Kuwanyi married them to each other.

=== Reign of Lahai Bara ===
From Jauwiru's descendants the Bulungan Sultanate would come into fruition. After Kuwanyi died, Jauwiru replaced the position as the leader of the Dayak Hupan tribe. Then Jauwiru had a son named Paran Anyi. Paran Anyi did not have a son, but had a daughter named Lahai Bara who later married a man named Wan Paren, who succeeded him in his position. From the marriage of Lahai Bara and Wan Paren, a son named Si Barau and a daughter named Simun Luwan were born.

At the end of her life, Lahai Bara mandated her children that her lungun (coffin) be placed downstream of the Kipah River. Lahai Bara inherited three types of heirloom objects, namely ani-ani (kerkapan), kedabang, (type of headgear), and a bersairuk (paddle). These three types of inherited items caused a dispute between Si Barau and his sister, Simun Luwan. Finally, Simun Luwan managed to take the oars and leave, taking Lahai Bara's coffin with her.

Because of the apparent supernatural powers possessed by Simun Luwan, just by scratching the tip of the oar on a cape from the Payang River, the cape broke off and drifted downstream to the edge of the Kayan River, which is now located in the village of Long Peleban. It is in the upstream of the village of Long Peleban that Lahai Bara's coffin is buried. According to belief, all descendants of Lahai Bara, especially the descendants of the Bulungan kings, in the past no one dared to cross Lahai Bara's grave, because they were afraid of the curse of Si Barau when he fought with Simun Luwan. That anyone from Lahai Bara's descendants who passed his coffin would definitely not be saved. The drifting cape is still called Busang Mayun by the Kayan people, meaning 'drifting island'.

=== Emigration of the Kayan people and raid by Sumbang Lawing ===
Simun Luwan's departure was caused by a dispute with her own brother, at that time it was the beginning of the migration of the Kayan tribes, leaving their ancestral home on the Payang River to the Kayan River, and settling not far from Tanjung Selor, the current capital of Bulungan Regency. The Kayan people is still found in several villages along the Kayan River, upstream of Tanjung Selor, in Long Mara Village, Antutan and Pimping. Simun Luwan had a husband named Sadang, and from their marriage a daughter was born named Asung Luwan. Simun Luwan and Sadang established a dynasty around the Kayan. Folk history states that in 1555, a Kenyah people led by Sumbang Lawing raided the Dayak Hupan and its leader, Sadang, who was Sumbang Lawing's own brother, was killed. Amidst the chaos, Asung Luwan managed to flee towards the Baratan coast.

=== Marriage of Asung Luwan to Datuk Mencang ===
Princess Asung Luwan married a nobleman from Brunei named Datuk Mencang. This marriage founded a Hindu lineage who settled in the region of today's Tanjung Selor, with Datuk Mencang as the first ruler, titled Ksatria Wira, with wira being a title equivalent to that of a king.

Datuk Mencang's proposal to Asung Luwan was rejected, unless the prince from Brunei was able to present a dowry in the form of the head of Sumbang Lawing, the killer of Sadang, his own brother. Through struggle, dexterity and intelligence, Datuk Mencang was finally able to defeat Sumbang Lawing. The duel was carried out by a test of dexterity in splitting a moving orange with a weapon. Datuk Mencang was superior and won the test of dexterity. Datuk Mencang ruled Bulungan from 1555 until 1595 with his capital located at Busang Arau (Kuala Sungai Pengian). The capital was later relocated to Limbu in 1695 by his descendant Wira Digedung.

=== Conversion to Islam and foundation ===
In 1731, this dynasty, now under Wira Amir, who recently converted to Islam as Sultan Amiril Mukminin. This marked the foundation of Bulungan as a sultanate. Wira Amir moved his capital from Busang Arau to Salim Batu. Bulungan was recognised as a vassal of the sultan of Berau, the latter acknowledging himself a vassal of Kutai. However, Berau later fell under a civil war in 1770.

=== Reign of Alimuddin ===
Aji Ali succeeded his father as Sultan Alimuddin and moved the capital from Salim Batu to Tanjung Palas, converting Salim Batu into a rice field. After the civil war in Berau, Sulu sacked both Berau and Tarakan in 1789. Bulungan declared independence from Berau. By the early 19th century, Sulu became the dominant power in northeastern Borneo, placing Bulungan loosely under the sphere of influence of Sulu.

During this period, vessels began travelling to Sulu, Tarakan, and thence into the interior of Bulungan, to trade directly with Tidung. This influence officially ended in 1878 (however already terminated by 1855) with the signing of a treaty between the English and Spanish, partitioning Sulu.

=== Dutch intervention ===
After the Dutch conquered Berau in 1834, they forced the sultan to sign an agreement on 27 September, the main content of which was to acknowledge the Dutch as the sovereign and guaranteed the entire Bulungan region, making Bulungan an official Dutch protectorate.

The Dutch then imposed their sovereignty upon Kutai in 1848, they signed a politiek contract with the Sultan on 12 November 1850. The Dutch intervened in the region to combat piracy and the trafficking in slaves.

=== Independence from Sulu and the Tidung conquest ===
In February 1849, the residents of the three villages (kampong) along the Sebuku River declared their allegiance not to Bulungan but to Sulu, which led to Bulungan using military force to subjugate the area, driving the people of Sebuku to Atas, leaving Sebuku uninhabited. Bulungan gave support to the Sesayap Tidung against Sulu and the Iranun pirates. Since this point, Bulungan forbid its Tidung vassals from trading to Sulu directly, forcing them to trade only through Bulungan. By means of political marriage, Tarakan and other states in the Tidung Lands became subjects of Bulungan. During this period, the jurisdiction of Bulungan extended all the way towards Tawau, entering into a dispute with the Sultan of Sulu, who also had a claim in the region. In 1855, Bulungan stopped paying tribute to Sulu for 50 years, thereby becoming de facto independent from Sulu, and by 1900, Tausug activities in the region had practically diminished due to the increasing Dutch interference.

=== Incorporation into the Dutch East Indies ===
After a treaty providing the Dutch some control over the sultanate's internal affairs, Bulungan was finally incorporated into the colonial empire of the Dutch East Indies in June 1878 and the Dutch had a say in the appointment of a new sultan. In 1881, the North Borneo Chartered Company was created, thereby placing northern Borneo under British jurisdiction, despite initial Dutch objections. The Dutch installed a government post in 1893 in Tanjung Selor.

=== Discovery of oil ===
Dutch rule over the Bulungan remained nominal in practice not until after the discovery of oil and natural rubber in eastern Kalimantan in the late 19th century. Since then, the Dutch government gave approval for the Dutch East Indies to intervene in the affairs of the states in the region in January 1900.

In 1903, Dutch forces began a military expedition against the Apo Kayan people in the interior. In 1909, Bulungan fell under the open-ended provisions of the korte verklaring (short declaration), with its financial affairs being managed by the Dutch East Indies government through the landschapkassen (state treasuries), as well as selling its de facto power over the interior. Around the same year, the Sultan helped put down a Dayak rebellion led by Panembahan Raja Pendeta (Sapu) in the Tidung Lands. Tidung Lands were reintegrated into Bulungan and the Kingdom of Sembawang was abolished.

In 1911, the Dutch government began to be posted into interior Apo Kayan region after an officer was permanently placed in Longnawan. However, the intervention remained superficial and the Apo Kayan under the leadership of Oema Tow maintained a high degree of autonomy. As a result, Dutch officers in the area were pressured to respect indigenous authority in the area.

The area was allowed to be part of the sultanate so that the sultan will pay for the administration of the Apo Kayan region, while having no actual power himself. The government imposed measures to incite an anti-Muslim sentiment among the interior ethnic groups as an effort to encourage the recent influx of Christian missionaries in the area.

On 17 February 1913, the Dutch and the British signed a border agreement, finalizing the boundary in North Borneo between the two jurisdictions, which was confirmed by a later treaty on 28 September 1915. In December 1914, with the Dutch increasing taxes regarding oil-related transactions, a rebellion led by the Datu Adil who was the self-proclaimed Raja of Tarakan and his brother Datu Djamalul erupted in Peningki and Salimbatu, urging the people to refuse paying taxes to the colonial government. They were arrested on the 21st and placed into the Tajung Selor Prison before being sent into exile at Samarinda the next year.

The discovery of oil by the BPM (Bataafse Petroleum Maatschappij) in the islands of Bunyu and Tarakan gave great importance to Bulungan for the Dutch, who made Tarakan the chief town of the regency. In 1928, the sultanate was granted zelfbestuur (self-administration) status, like many princely states of the Netherlands Indies.

=== Incorporation into Indonesia ===
After the recognition of Indonesian independence from the Kingdom of the Netherlands in 1945, Bulungan was incorporated into an autonomous constitutional unit called the Federation of East Kalimantan as a self-governing entity still under the sovereignty of the Dutch East Indies on 4 February 1948 before joining Indonesia on 17 August 1949. A year after in 1950, Bulungan became a wilayah swapraja, or autonomous territory, before receiving the status of wilayah istimewa or special territory, in 1955. The last Sultan, Jalaluddin, died in 1958. The Sultanate was abolished in 1959 and the territory becomes a simple kabupaten or regency.

=== Post-annexation ===
On the dawn of Friday, 3 July 1964, a troop of Brawijaya 517 soldiers led by Lieutenant B Simatupang under the orders of Brigadier General Soepardjo quickly swooped in the Bulungan Palace, kidnapping its aristocrat inhabitants while burning the rest of the palace grounds which lasted for 2 days and nights on Friday 24 July 1964. The kidnapees were later murdered, one Raja Muda Datu Mukemat in particular was reported to have been brought to sea between the islands of Tarakan and Bunyu, where he was shackled with stones as weight, shot dead and cast out into the sea.

== Rulers ==
These are the recorded rulers of the Sultanate of Bulungan.

| Reign | Sultan | Information and events |
|---|---|---|
| 1731–1777 | Wira Amir, styled as Sultan Amiril Mukminin | He was the founder of the Sultanate of Bulungan after his conversion to Islam, with his capital situated at Salim Batu. He became a vassal of Berau. |
| 1777–1817 | Aji Ali, styled as Sultan Alimuddin | Under his rule, the capital of Bulungan was moved to Tanjung Palas. |
| 1817–1861, 1866–1873 | Aji Muhammad, styled as Sultan Muhammad Amiril Kaharuddin | During his reign, the Dutch conquered Berau in 1834, and Bulungan signed a treaty with the Dutch recognizing the Netherlands as its sovereign in the same year, followed by another treaty in 1850, increasing Dutch influence to combat piracy in the region. In 1849, he went to war with the Tidungs and subjugated them under his rule, monopolizing trade in northeastern Borneo. In 1855, he stopped paying tribute to the Sultan of Sulu. He abdicated his throne in favor of his son Muhammad Djalaluddin in 1861 due to his old age, but retook the throne in 1866 after Djalaluddin died to prevent the throne from falling into the hands of Datuk Alam. |
| 1861–1866 | Si Kidding, styled as Sultan Muhammad Djalaluddin | He was the son of Muhammad Amiril Kaharuddin. He died in 1866. |
| 1873–1875 | Datuk Alam, styled as Sultan Khalifatul Alam Muhammad Adil | He took the throne coming from a different branch of the family. He violated the agreement with the Netherlands, which led to his poisoning at a banquet at the Bulungan palace in 1875. |
| 1875–1889 | Ali Kahar, styled as Sultan Kaharuddin II | During his reign, the Dutch completely incorporated Bulungan into the Dutch East Indies in June 1878. |
| 1889–1899 | Si Gieng, styled as Sultan Azimuddin | During his reign, the Dutch installed a post at Tanjung Selor. Puteri Sibut took over as female regent in 1899 after his death with the assistance of her prime minister because the eldest son Datuk Belembung was too young to rule. |
| 1901–1925 | Datuk Belembung, styled as Sultan Maulana Muhammad Kasim Al-Din | During his reign, with the assistance of the Dutch, he put down a Dayak rebellion led by Panembahan Raja Pendeta of Sembawang in the Tidung Lands. He annexed the Tidung Lands into his domain. |
| 1925–1930 | Datuk Mansyur (acting) | He was an acting sultan. During his reign, Bulungan was granted zelfbestuur (self administration) over its internal affairs. The capital was moved to Tarakan. The hinterland tribes such as the Apo Kayan, the Pujungan and the Leppo' Ma'ut were annexed into Bulungan. |
| 1930–1931 | Achmad Sulaiman, styled as Sultan Muhammad Sulaiman | Datuk Mansyur handed over power to Achmad Sulaiman. He suddenly died the next year. |
| 1931–1958 | Datuk Tiras, styled as Sultan Maulana Muhammad Djalaluddin II | His rule oversaw the events during World War II, such as the Japanese occupation and the return of the Dutch administration, followed by Indonesia's declaration of independence in 1945, and Bulungan's admission into Indonesia on 17 August 1949. In 1950, Bulungan gained autonomy, and became a special territory in 1955. He died in 1958 and the sultanate was dissolved in 1959. |

== Gallery ==
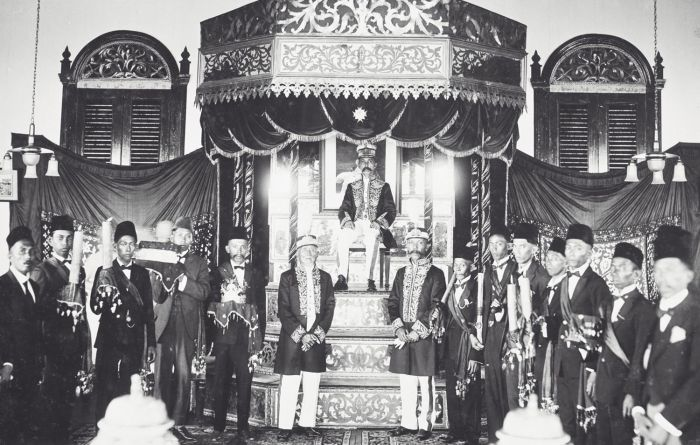
The ruiling class of the Bulungan Sultanate (taken c. 1925–1935).

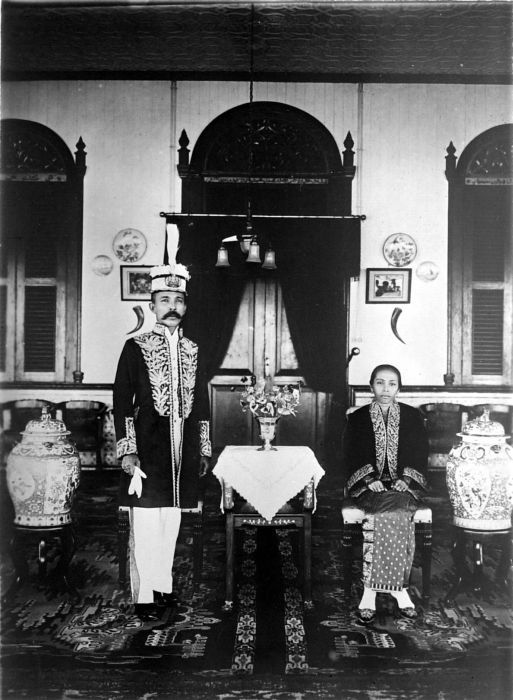
Abdul Jalil of Bulungan with the Queen consort (1940).

== Sources ==
- Burhan Magenda, East Kalimantan: the decline of a commercial aristocracy, Cornell Modern Indonesia Project, 1991, ISBN 0-87763-036-4
- Sellato, Bernard, Forest, Resources and People in Bulungan, Center for International Forestry Research, 2001, ISBN 979-8764-76-5
