= North Kalimantan =

Province in Kalimantan, Indonesia

North Kalimantan Kalimantan Utara
- Province
- Province of North Kalimantan; Provinsi Kalimantan Utara
- Coat of arms
- Motto: Benuanta (Bolongan) "Our land that needs to be developed and safeguarded"
- North Kalimantan in Indonesia
- Interactive map of North Kalimantan
- Coordinates: 3°00′N 116°20′E
- Country: Indonesia
- Region: Kalimantan (Western Indonesia)
- Established: 17 November 2012, separate from East Kalimantan
- Capital: Tanjung Selor; 2°50′45″N 117°22′00″E
- Largest city: Tarakan; 3°19′30″N 117°34′40″E

Government
  - Body: North Kalimantan Provincial Government
  - Governor: Zainal Arifin Paliwang (Gerindra)
  - Vice Governor: Ingkong Ala
  - Legislature: North Kalimantan Regional House of Representatives (DPRD)

Area
  - Total: 69,901 km^{2} (26,989 sq mi)
- Highest elevation (Mount Apad Runan): 2,080 m (6,824 ft)

Population (mid 2025 estimate)
  - Total: 749,370
  - Density: 10.720/km^{2} (27.766/sq mi)

Demographics
  - Ethnic groups: See ethnic groups
  - Religion: Islam (70.97%); Christianity (28.32%): Protestant (21.10%); Catholic (7.22%); Buddhism (0.65%); Hinduism (0.06%)
  - Languages: Indonesian (official); Dayak, Tidung, Murut, Bulungan, Buginese and other (regional)
- Time zone: UTC+8 (WITA)
- GDP (nominal): 2022
- Total: Rp 138.7 trillion (26th); US$ 9.3 billion Int$ 29.2 billion (PPP)
- Per capita: Rp 190.6 million (3rd); US$ 12,837; Int$ 40,056 (PPP)
- Growth: ▲5.34%
- HDI (2024): ▲0.734 (24th) – high
- Website: kaltaraprov.go.id

North Kalimantan (Indonesian: Kalimantan Utara) is a province of Indonesia. It is located in the northernmost part of Kalimantan, the Indonesian portion of the island of Borneo. North Kalimantan is bordered by the Malaysian states of Sabah to the north and Sarawak to the west, and by the Indonesian province of East Kalimantan to the south. The town of Tanjung Selor serves as the capital of the province, while Tarakan is the largest urban area, the province's sole city and financial centre.

Formed on 25 October 2012, North Kalimantan was separated from the province of East Kalimantan in order to reduce development disparity and Malaysia's influence over the territory. North Kalimantan covers 69,901 square kilometres and consists of four regencies and one city. It had a population of 524,656 at the 2010 Census and 701,784 at the 2020 Census, making it at that time the least populous province in Indonesia, until the subsequent creation in 2022 of the new provinces of South Papua (which became the new least populous province), West Papua and Southwest Papua. The official estimate as at mid 2025 was 749,370 people (comprising 393,130 males and 356,240 females). Most of the province is sparsely populated.

== History ==
North Kalimantan is the territory of the Sultanate of Bulungan, which was founded by a group of coastal Kayan. Around the 16th century, a Kayan princess called, Asung Luwan, married a visiting nobleman from Brunei, called Datuk Mencang. From this line a princely state was established, centered in Tanjung Selor, which ruled territory now comprising Bulungan, Tana Tidung, Malinau, Nunukan, Tarakan, and some part of Sabah. Bulungan was a vassal of the Berau Sultanate, which in turn was a vassal of the Kingdom of Kutai. During subsequent wars, the territory fell into the hands of Brunei and after agreements were made with the Sultanate of Sulu, the territory officially came under Sulu control. In 1777, the royal family converted to Islam, with the king Wira Amir changing his name to Aji Muhammad, and title to Sultan Amirul Mukminin. In 1853, The Dutch signed a Politiek Contract to impose their sovereignty over the Bulungan kingdom, Sulu was not able to respond as it was also in a war with Spain. Then in 1881, the British North Borneo Company (BNBC) was formed, placing North Borneo (present-day Sabah) under British jurisdiction, and claiming the region of Tawau. While under Dutch control, the sultan was forced to hand over control of the Bahau river, Pujungan river, and Apo Kayan. After long negotiation with the British, the Dutch recognised the British borders in 1915 which became the modern border between Sabah and North Kalimantan. During World War II, the Japanese occupying forces had an agreement with Bulungan under which they shared natural resources and in exchange the region largely escaped the Romusha system.

=== Bultiken Tragedy ===
In 1963, during the Indonesia–Malaysia confrontation, the Sultanate of Bulungan's position on the formation of Malaysia was ambiguous. In April 1964, it was reported that a document was found proving the ties between Bulungan aristocracy and Malaysia and in conflict would support the formation of Malaysia and in turn join Malaysia. On 24 April 1964, leader of regional military commands Mulawarman, Brigadier General Soeharjo ordered the capture and killing of Bulungan aristocracy. On 2 July 1964, Lt B. Simatupang and Captain Buntaran were received cordially by the Sultan of Bulungan. By 3 July 1964, the palace was invaded by units of Brawijaya 517, the palace was burned and looted, and members of the royal family killed. According to Burhan Djabier in his 1991 book, East Kalimantan: The Decline of a Commercial Aristocracy, the central TNI leadership did not act or replace him because, Brigadier General Soeharjo was a known leftist and politically connected. Most leftists and the PKI were hostile to royals causing parallels the East Sumatra revolution. This is also the position of the sultanate, as according to Dato' Seri Pangeran Sanusi Hussin, the PKI was responsible for the burning of the royal palace and ethnic cleansing.

The surviving royal family fled and became citizens of Malaysia. In 2017, the royal family announced that they were in the process of becoming Indonesian citizens.

== Transport ==
Tarakan Airport also known as Juwata International Airport on the eponymous island serves the province, as well as an international ferry port with services to Malaysia from Tawau. There are no international land crossings – entrance into the mainland of the province is by ferry from Tarakan or by road from the south. Large stretches of the roads in this province are of unpaved muddy ditches.

The airport area and runway is also shared with Suharnoko Harbani Air Force Base, a Type A airbase of the TNI-AU (Indonesian Air Force). The airbase is named after the former Minister of Industry of Indonesia, Suharnoko Harbani, who was also formerly an Air Force officer. Formed in 2006, the establishment of this air base is essentially part of the strategy and efforts to realize the defense of the country from the potential and development of threats that will threaten the Indonesia as well as the organization's demands from the Air Force Operations Command II in Makassar to facilitate control of its duties. Before the formation of the Air Base, there was already an Indonesian Air Force post which was under the Balikpapan Air Force Base but due to the development of situation and tension with Malaysia in Ambalat, the leadership of the Air Force decided to form a new airbase. Due to the airport is used both by military and civil aviation, so the apron is also used together. In July 2014, the airport authority initials to build 183 meters taxiway to the military apron which can accommodate 4 Sukhoi and 2 Hercules together and the project is predicted to be finished in December 2014.

The Trans-Kalimantan Highway (Jalan Trans Kalimantan) was finished at early 2019 under the administration of President Joko Widodo. The route connects Pontianak, West Kalimantan with Tanjung Selor, the capital city of North Kalimantan.

== Government and administrative divisions ==
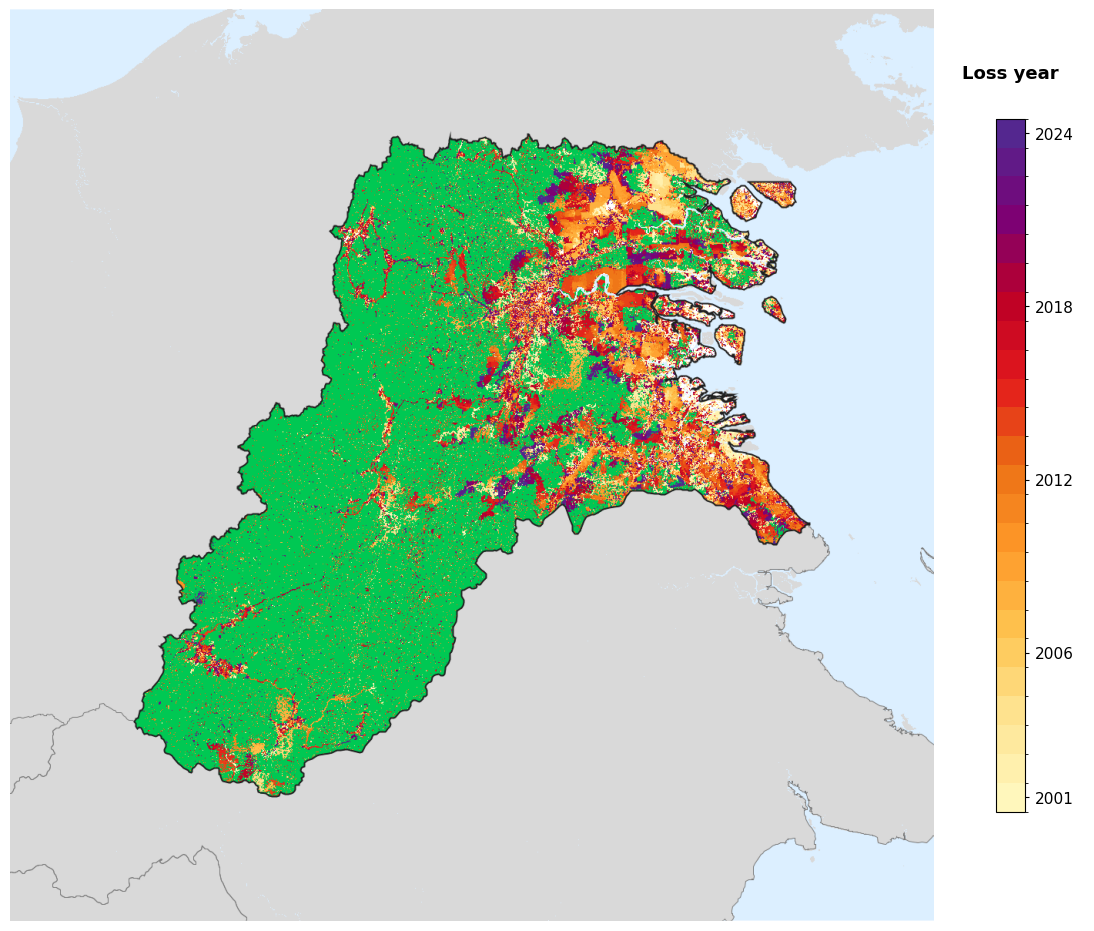
Tree-cover loss year in North Kalimantan, 2001-2024, from the Global Forest Change dataset.

North Kalimantan is divided into four regencies (kabupaten) and one city (kota), listed below with their areas and their populations at the 2010 Census and 2020 Census, together with the official estimates as at mid 2025.

Kode Wilayah	Name of City or Regency	Area (km^{2})	Population			Capital	HDI 2018 Estimates
Kode Wilayah	Name of City or Regency	Area (km^{2})	2010 Census	2020 Census	mid 2025 Estimate	Capital	HDI 2018 Estimates
65.01	Bulungan Regency	13,720	112,663	151,844	162,400	Tanjung Selor	0.712 (High)
65.02	Malinau Regency	38,902	62,580	82,510	87,490	Malinau	0.717 (High)
65.03	Nunukan Regency	12,550	140,841	199,090	213,980	Nunukan	0.656 (Medium)
65.04	Tana Tidung Regency	3,481	15,202	25,584	28,820	Tideng Pale	0.670 (Medium)
65.71	Tarakan City	248	193,370	242,756	256,670	Tarakan City	0.756 (High)
	Totals	69,901	524,656	701,784	749,370	Tanjung Selor	0.705 (High)

The province now forms one of Indonesia's 84 national electoral districts to elect members to the People's Representative Council. The North Kalimantan Electoral District consists of all of the 4 regencies in the province, together with the city of Tarakan, and elects 3 members to the People's Representative Council.

== Demographics ==
Historical population
Year	Pop.	±%
1971	119,199	—
1980	176,923	+48.4%
1990	232,494	+31.4%
2000	315,011	+35.5%
2010	524,656	+66.6%
2020	701,784	+33.8%
2025	749,370	+6.8%
Source: Statistics Indonesia 2026 and earlier. North Kalimantan formed a part of East Kalimantan Province until 25 October 2012.

=== Ethnic groups ===
Several ethnic groups found in North Kalimantan include:

- Indigenous Peoples of Kalimantan
  - Dayak people, inhabiting the upstream/interior regions, particularly in Malinau Regency
  - Tidung people, inhabiting Tana Tidung Regency and Tarakan City
  - Bulungan people, inhabiting Bulungan Regency
  - Banjar people and Kutai people, inhabiting urban areas, particularly in Tarakan City
- Migrant Groups
  - Bugis people, the largest ethnic group in North Kalimantan, originating from South Sulawesi and ...inhabit coastal and urban areas throughout North Kalimantan. In addition to the Bugis people, there are other ethnic groups from Sulawesi present in North Kalimantan in significant numbers, such as the Toraja and Makassar peoples from South Sulawesi, the Buton people from Southeast Sulawesi, and the Minahasa people from North Sulawesi.
  - The Javanese people, originating from East Java, Central Java, and the Special Region of Yogyakarta, inhabit urban areas, transmigration settlements, mining sites, plantations, and industrial zones throughout North Kalimantan.
  - The Sundanese people from West Java and Banten, the Batak people from North Sumatra, the Chinese community, and various other ethnic groups from across Indonesia are also found in the urban areas, transmigration settlements, mining sites, plantations, and industrial zones of North Kalimantan.

Ethnic Composition in North Kalimantan (following its separation from East Kalimantan)
No	Ethnic Group	Population (2010)	%
1	Bugis	180,030	32.42%
2	Combined Dayak, Tidung, and Bulungan peoples	173,614	31.27%
3	Javanese	100,925	18.18%
4	Banjar	24,764	4.46%
5	Toraja	13,946	2.51%
6	Makassarese	9,199	2.27%
7	Chinese Indonesians	7,071	1.27%
8	Kutai	6,265	1.13%
9	Sundanese	6,141	1.11%
10	Buton	5,759	1.0 4%
11	Batak	5,347	0.96%
12	Minahasa	3,292	0.59%
	Other ethnic groups	18,922	3.41%
	Total	555,275	100.00%

=== Religion ===
Religion in North Kalimantan (2022)
1. Muslim (73.4%)
2. Protestantism (19.5%)
3. Roman Catholic (6.43%)
4. Buddhism (0.56%)
5. Hinduism (0.05%)
6. Confucianism (0.02%)
7. Others (0.01%)

According to the 2020 census, 507,780 people are Muslims, 137,540 are Protestants, 42,260 are Roman Catholics, 4,165 follow Buddhism, 344 are Hindus, 151 are Confucians and 11 follow folk religions.

== Coat of arms ==
The coat of arms of North Kalimantan is in the form of a pentagonal shield containing a star, a mountain, a border gate, and a traditional shield decorated with Dayak, Bulungan, and Tidung motifs, crossed by a mandau and spear. It is surrounded by 22 rice grains and 13 cotton bolls tied with four knots, along with ocean waves at the base. The five-sided shape represents the principles of Pancasila, while the sky-blue background symbolizes beauty, prosperity, peace, and authority.

=== Development ===
==== First design ====
Following the separation from East Kalimantan, North Kalimantan required a provincial emblem. The initial version was codified under Governor Regulation No. 4/2014, depicting a shield with a sky-blue and sea-blue background, a star, a white ribbon inscribed with "Kalimantan Utara", a Dayak–Tidung–Bulungan talawang shield crossed by a mandau and spear, 22 rice grains, 13 cotton bolls, four knots, four ocean waves, and the motto Benuanta. Governor Zainal Arifin Paliwang later criticized this design, noting that elements from the original concept—such as hornbills, a green mountain, and a boat—were omitted. Since no provincial regulation had been passed at the time, the governor and the DPRD began discussions in March 2021 to restore the original design.

The motto Benuanta is a Bulungan term meaning "our land that must be developed together".

==== Second design ====
With the enactment of Regional Regulation No. 3/2021, the absent elements were restored, while the rice was increased to 25 grains and the cotton to 12 bolls, tied with ten twists. These numbers symbolize 25 October 2012, the province’s founding date.

== See also ==
- Bulungan Sultanate
