= Bulungan Regency =

Regency in North Kalimantan, Indonesia

Coordinates: 3.0000°N 117.1667°E

Bulungan Regency Kabupaten Bulungan
- Regency
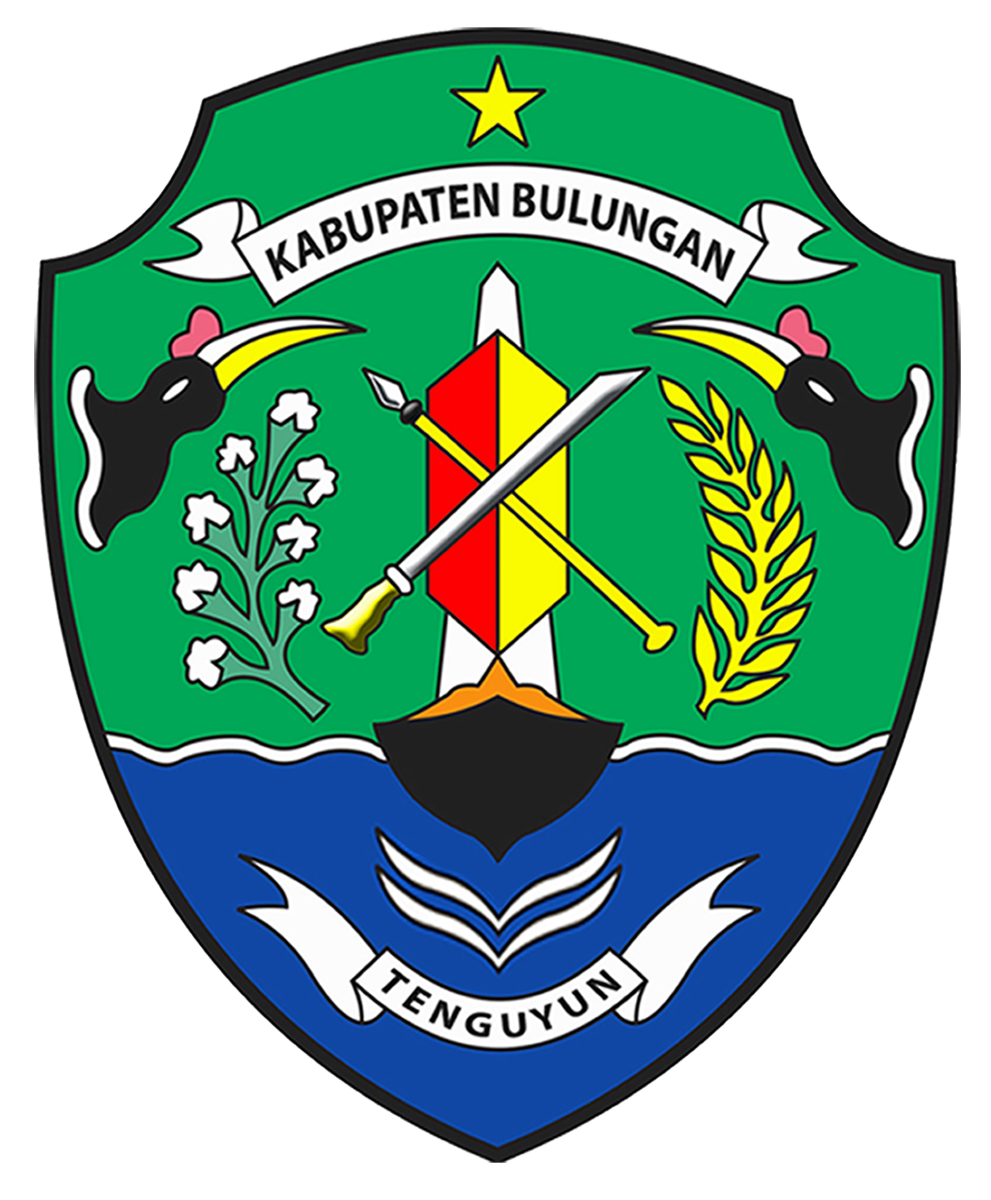
- Coat of arms
- Motto: Tenguyun (Together)
- Location of Bulungan Regency in North Kalimantan.
- Country: Indonesia
- Province: North Kalimantan
- Capital: Tanjung Selor

Government
  - Regent: Syarwani
  - Vice Regent: Kilat

Area
  - Total: 13,181.92 km^{2} (5,089.57 sq mi)

Population (mid 2025 estimate)
  - Total: 173,688
  - Density: 13.1762/km^{2} (34.1263/sq mi)
- Time zone: UTC+8 (Central Indonesian Time)
- Website: bulungan.go.id

Bulungan Regency, formerly known as Bulongan, is a regency of North Kalimantan Province in Indonesia. It covers an area of 13,181.92 km^{2} and had a population of 112,663 at the 2010 Census and 151,844 at the 2020 Census; the official estimate as at mid 2025 was 173,688. The administrative centre is at Tanjung Selor.

== History ==
The modern iteration of Bulongan Regency (the original spelling) was established on 26 June 1959, replacing the earlier Special Region of Bulongan which was governed by the Sultanate of Bulungan (the last sultan: Maulana Muhammad Djalaluddin or Datuk Tiras). It was then one of the founder regencies of East Kalimantan during its establishment in 1956. It is unknown when exactly this regency changed its spelling into the current one.

Bulungan was originally co-extensive with what subsequently became the province of North Kalimantan. On 8 October 1997 the town of Tarakan was cut out of the regency to become an independent city. Two years later, on 4 October 1999, the remaining territory of the regency was split to create two additional regencies - Malinau Regency and Nunukan Regency. On 17 July 2007, three more districts (kecamatan) was split from Bulungan Regency to form a new regency, Tana Tidung Regency.

Bulangan Regency had originally been part of the East Kalimantan province, but in 2012 it - together with the areas carved out of it in 1997, 1999 and 2007 - became part of the newly created North Kalimantan province. Tanjung Selor in Bulungan Regency was designated as the province's capital.

== Administrative districts ==
The regency is divided into ten districts (kecamatan), tabulated below with their areas and their populations at the 2010 Census and the 2020 Census, together with the official estimates as at mid 2025. The table also includes the locations of the district administrative centres, the number of administrative villages in each district (a total of 74 rural desa and 7 urban kelurahan), and its postal codes.

| Kode Wilayah | Name of District (kecamatan) | Area in km^{2} | Pop'n Census 2010 | Pop'n Census 2020 | Pop'n Estimate mid 2025 | Admin centre | No. of villages | Post codes |
|---|---|---|---|---|---|---|---|---|
| 65.01.07 | Peso ^{(a)} | 3,142.79 | 4,327 | 4,400 | 4,386 | Long Bia | 10 | 77261 |
| 65.01.08 | Peso Hilir (Lower Peso) | 1,639.71 | 3,484 | 4,134 | 4,205 | Long Tungu | 6 | 77262 |
| 65.01.02 | Tanjung Palas Barat (West Tanjung Palas) | 1,064.51 | 5,832 | 6,416 | 7,041 | Long Beluah | 5 | 77217 |
| 65.01.01 | Tanjung Palas | 1,755.74 | 14,032 | 17,556 | 19,076 | Gunung Putih | 9 ^{(b)} | 77211; 77214-77216 |
| 65.01.05 | Tanjung Selor ^{(c)} | 677.77 | 39,439 | 56,569 | 67,837 | Tanjung Selor Hilir | 9 ^{(d)} | 77211 & 77212 |
| 65.01.04 | Tanjung Palas Timur (East Tanjung Palas) | 1,277.81 | 8,651 | 18,020 | 22,301 | Tanah Kuning | 8 | 77215 |
| 65.01.06 | Tanjung Palas Tengah (Central Tanjung Palas) ^{(e)} | 624.95 | 7,527 | 11,567 | 12,298 | Salim Batu | 3 | 77216 |
| 65.01.03 | Tanjung Palas Utara (North Tanjung Palas) | 806.34 | 8,954 | 10,651 | 11,971 | Karang Agung | 6 | 77218 |
| 65.01.09 | Sekatak ^{(f)} | 1,993.98 | 9,278 | 10,842 | 12,426 | Sekatak Buji | 22 | 77263 |
| 65.01.10 | Bunyu | 198.32 | 11,139 | 11,689 | 12,147 | Bunyu Barat | 3 | 77281 |
| | Totals | 13,181.92 | 112,663 | 151,844 | 173,688 | Tanjung Selor | 81 | |

Notes: (a) including 5 offshore islands.
(b) comprising 4 kelurahan (Karang Anyar, Tanjung Palas Hilir, Tanjung Palas Hulu and Tanjung Palas Tengah) and 5 desa. (c) including 7 offshore islands.
(d) comprising 3 kelurahan (Tanjung Selor Hilir, Tanjung Selor Hulu and Tanjung Selor Timur) and 6 desa. (e) including 65 offshore islands. (f) including 10 offshore islands.

== Gallery ==
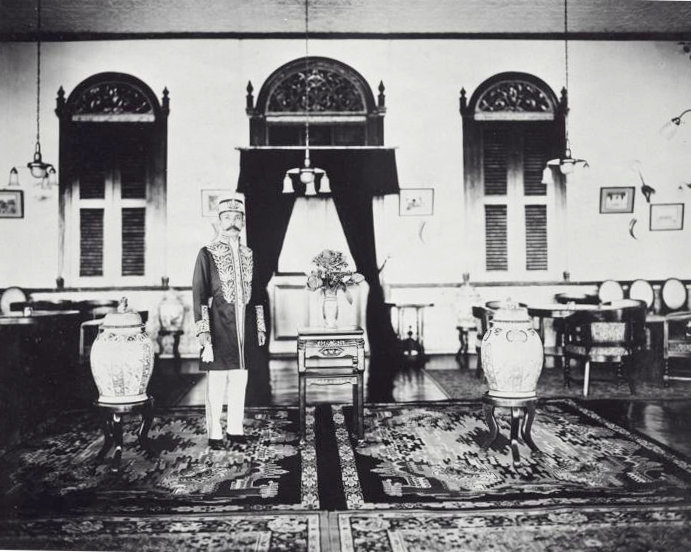
Sultan Maulana Mohamad Jalaluddin of Bulungan (1931).

== See also ==
- Sultanate of Bulungan
