= 2020 Indonesian local elections =

← 2018	9 December 2020	2024 →

9 governors, 224 regents, and 37 mayors

Local elections (Indonesian: Pemilihan Kepala Daerah, Pilkada) were held in Indonesia on 9 December 2020. Voters elected nine governors, 224 regents, and 37 mayors across the country. All the elections were held on the same day, and over 100 million people were expected to be eligible to vote.

== Background ==
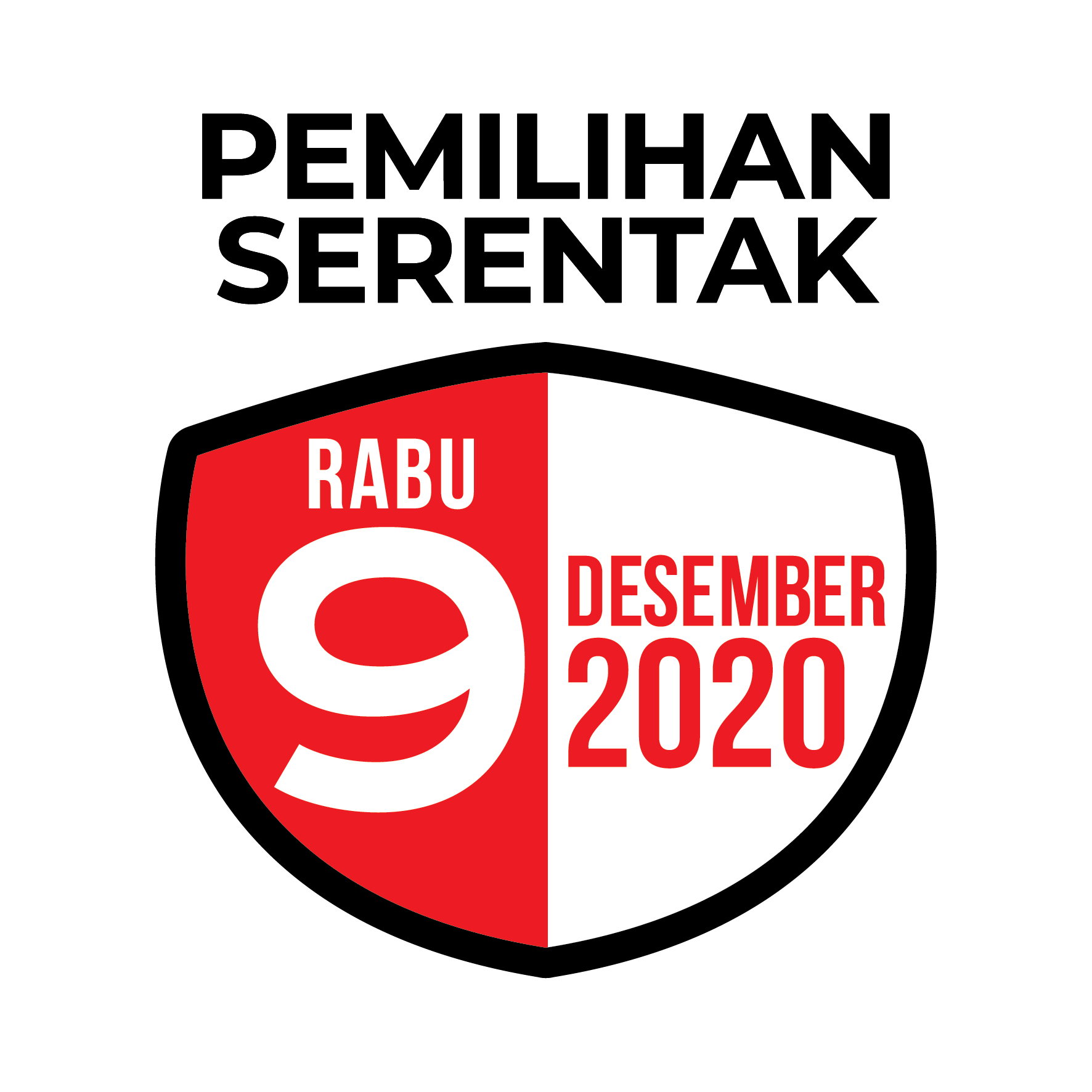
Logo of the elections

Simultaneous local elections (Pilkada Serentak) were first held in Indonesia in 2015. The leadup to the 2020 elections saw several regulations being issued by the General Elections Commission (KPU) barring certain candidates from running, from adulterers to politicians who had been charged with corruption. The decision that the simultaneous local elections throughout Indonesia would be held amid the COVID-19 pandemic stirred some controversy in the Indonesian public.

== Schedule ==
KPU released a schedule for the election in June 2019. Registration for the candidates would be held between 28 and 30 April 2020, with a campaign period lasting between June and September. The voting itself was initially planned for 23 September 2020. In October 2019, the Ministry of Home Affairs estimated that the election would require an expenditure of Rp 15.3 trillion (around US$1.1 billion), around double the budget for the 2015 local elections. In May 2020, due to the ongoing COVID-19 pandemic, President Joko Widodo issued a regulation postponing the election to December 2020, with further postponement being possible if the pandemic had not subsided by then.

The new schedule for the elections was released in June, with the new election date set for 9 December 2020 and the campaigning period being set between 26 September and 5 December 2020.

This election schedule planned by the Election Committee (KPU) and the government was opposed by several activists because by forcing a major event during a pandemic, they were breaching several Laws (UU Kekarantinaan Kesehatan & UU Wabah Penyakit Menular) which raising the risk of disease contagion among the people. There were more than 1500 health protocol violations during the campaigns, and 70.000 ballot officers tested reactive from COVID rapid tests and could not immediately be replaced.

In December 2020 also, the government insisted on holding Pilkades Serentak (Simultaneous village leader elections) in more than 1200 villages.

== Elections ==
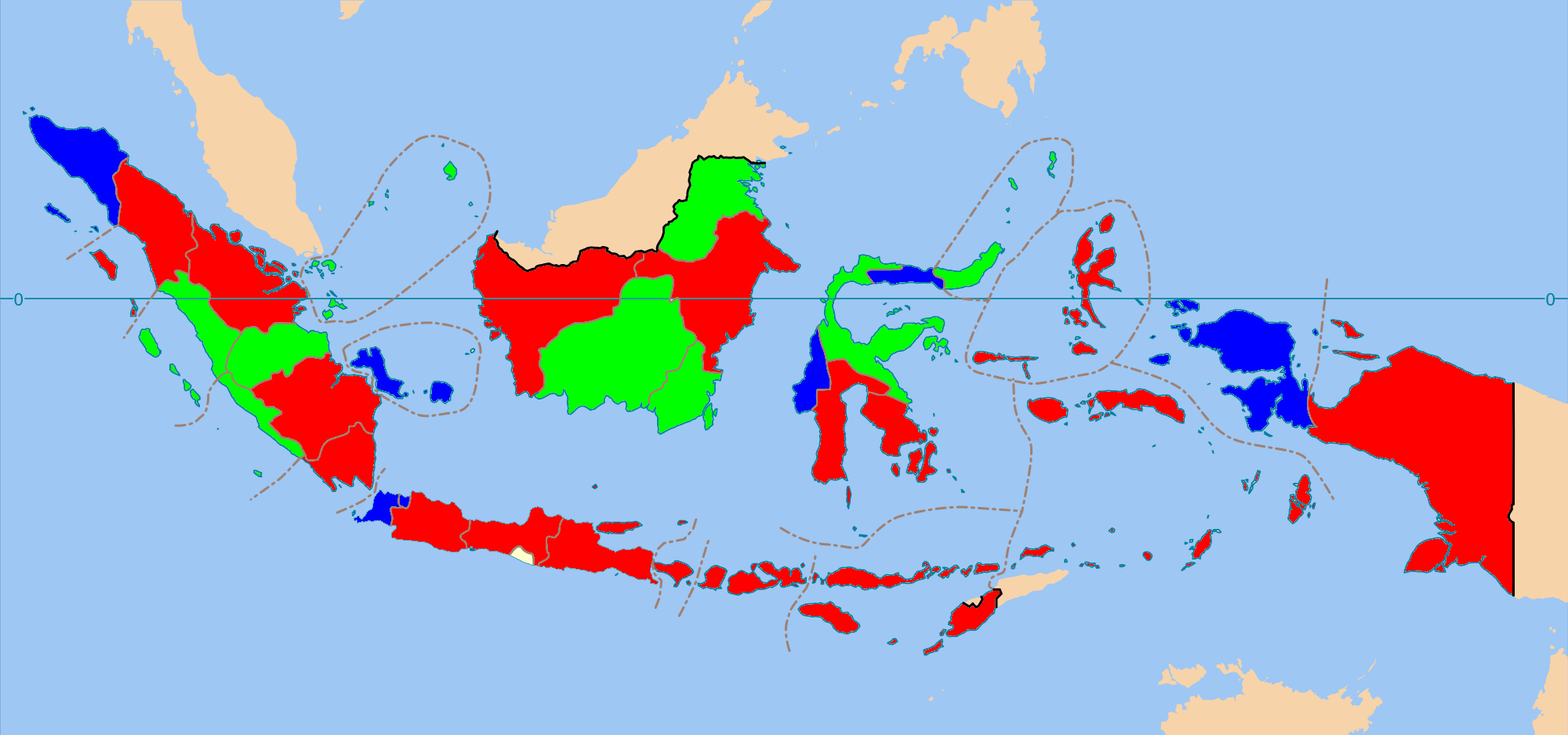
Map of the gubernatorial elections by year. Provinces in green held gubernatorial elections in 2020.

=== Gubernatorial ===
Province	Previous governor (Note: Prior to replacement with appointed acting governors/mayors/regents, including elected deputies which replaced leaders who died in office, resigned, or arrested. Party affiliation are given as of election date.)	Elected governor
West Sumatra (details)	Irwan Prayitno (PKS)	Mahyeldi Ansharullah (PKS)
Jambi (details)	Zumi Zola (PAN)	Al Haris (PAN)
Bengkulu (details)	Rohidin Mersyah (Golkar)	Rohidin Mersyah (Golkar)
Riau Islands (details)	Muhammad Sani (Demokrat)	Ansar Ahmad (Golkar)
Central Kalimantan (details)	Sugianto Sabran (Gerindra)	Sugianto Sabran (PDI-P)
South Kalimantan (details)	Sahbirin Noor (Gerindra)	Sahbirin Noor (Golkar)
North Kalimantan (details)	Irianto Lambrie (Demokrat)	Zainal Arifin Paliwang (Gerindra)
North Sulawesi (details)	Olly Dondokambey (PDI-P)	Olly Dondokambey (PDI-P)
Central Sulawesi (details)	Longki Djanggola (Gerindra)	Rusdy Mastura (NasDem)

=== Mayoral ===
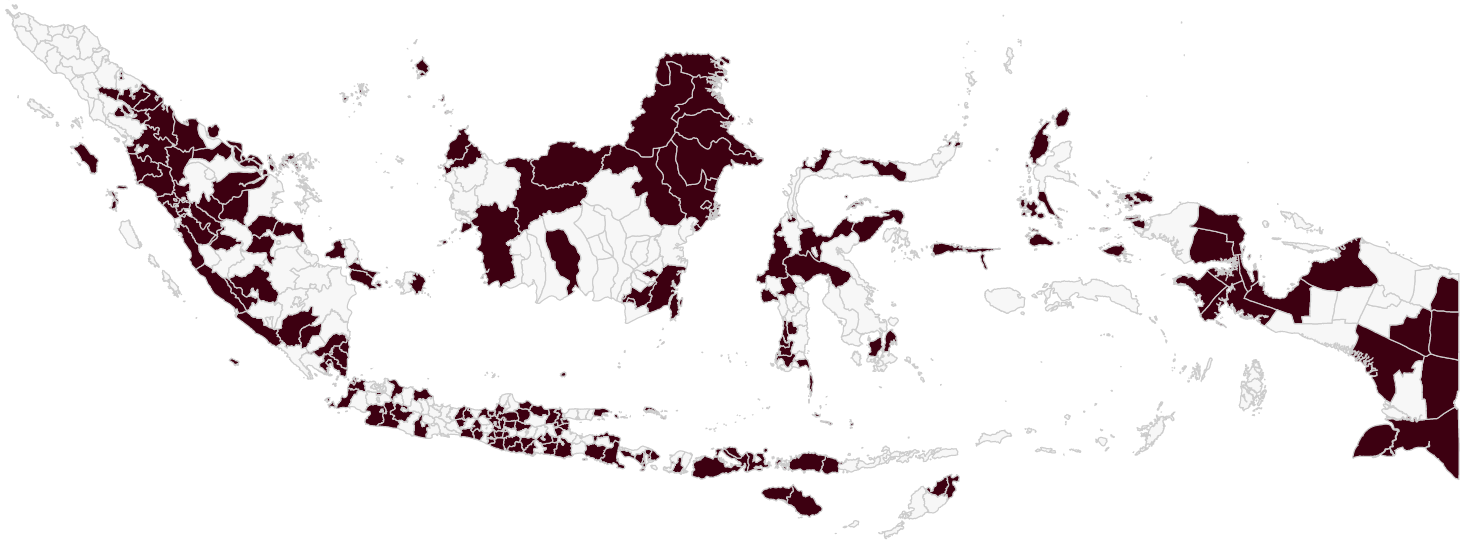
Regencies and cities holding local elections in 2020, shaded

City	Province	Notes
Medan	North Sumatra	details
Binjai	North Sumatra	
Sibolga	North Sumatra	
Tanjungbalai	North Sumatra	
Gunungsitoli	North Sumatra	
Pematangsiantar	North Sumatra	
Solok	West Sumatra	
Bukittinggi	West Sumatra	
Dumai	Riau	
Sungai Penuh	Jambi	
Metro	Lampung	
Bandar Lampung	Lampung	
Batam	Riau Islands	
Depok	West Java	details
Pekalongan	Central Java	
Semarang	Central Java	
Magelang	Central Java	
Surakarta	Central Java	details
Blitar	East Java	
Surabaya	East Java	details
Pasuruan	East Java	
Cilegon	Banten	
South Tangerang	Banten	details
Denpasar	Bali	
Mataram	West Nusa Tenggara	
Banjarbaru	South Kalimantan	
Banjarmasin	South Kalimantan	
Samarinda	East Kalimantan	
Balikpapan	East Kalimantan	
Bontang	East Kalimantan	
Bitung	North Sulawesi	
Manado	North Sulawesi	
Tomohon	North Sulawesi	
Palu	Central Sulawesi	
Makassar	South Sulawesi	details repeat after none of the above majority in 2018
Ternate	North Maluku	
Tidore	North Maluku	

=== Regency ===
Regency	Province	Notes
South Tapanuli	North Sumatra	
Serdang Bedagai	North Sumatra	
Toba Samosir	North Sumatra	
Labuhan Batu	North Sumatra	
Pakpak Bharat	North Sumatra	
Humbang Hasundutan	North Sumatra	
Asahan	North Sumatra	
Mandailing Natal	North Sumatra	
Samosir	North Sumatra	
Karo	North Sumatra	
Nias	North Sumatra	
South Nias	North Sumatra	
West Nias	North Sumatra	
Simalungun	North Sumatra	
South Labuhanbatu	North Sumatra	
North Labuhanbatu	North Sumatra	
North Nias	North Sumatra	
Solok	West Sumatra	
Agam	West Sumatra	
Pasaman	West Sumatra	
West Pasaman	West Sumatra	
Lima Puluh Kota	West Sumatra	
Dharmasraya	West Sumatra	
South Solok	West Sumatra	
Padang Pariaman	West Sumatra	
Sijunjung	West Sumatra	
Tanah Datar	West Sumatra	
Pesisir Selatan	West Sumatra	
Indragiri Hulu	Riau	
Bengkalis	Riau	
Kuantan Singingi	Riau	
Siak	Riau	
Rokan Hilir	Riau	
Rokan Hulu	Riau	
Pelalawan	Riau	
Kepulauan Meranti	Riau	
West Tanjung Jabung	Jambi	
Batang Hari	Jambi	
Bungo	Jambi	
East Tanjung Jabung	Jambi	
Ogan Komering Ulu	South Sumatra	
South Ogan Komering Ulu	South Sumatra	
Ogan Ilir	South Sumatra	
East Ogan Komering Ulu	South Sumatra	
Musi Rawas	South Sumatra	
Penukal Abab Lematang	South Sumatra	
North Musi Rawas	South Sumatra	
Seluma	Bengkulu	
Kaur	Bengkulu	
Rejang Lebong	Bengkulu	
Kepahiang	Bengkulu	
Lebong	Bengkulu	
Mukomuko	Bengkulu	
South Bengkulu	Bengkulu	
North Bengkulu	Bengkulu	
South Lampung	Lampung	
Way Kanan	Lampung	
East Lampung	Lampung	
Central Lampung	Lampung	
Pesawaran	Lampung	
Pesisir Barat	Lampung	
Central Bangka	Bangka–Belitung Islands	
East Belitung	Bangka–Belitung Islands	
West Bangka	Bangka–Belitung Islands	
South Bangka	Bangka–Belitung Islands	
Lingga	Riau Islands	
Bintan	Riau Islands	
Karimun	Riau Islands	
Natuna	Riau Islands	
Anambas Islands	Riau Islands	
Serang	Banten	
Pandeglang	Banten	
Sukabumi	West Java	
Bandung	West Java	
Indramayu	West Java	
Cianjur	West Java	
Tasikmalaya	West Java	
Karawang	West Java	
Pangandaran	West Java	
Pekalongan	Central Java	
Semarang	Central Java	
Kebumen	Central Java	
Rembang	Central Java	
Purbalingga	Central Java	
Blora	Central Java	
Boyolali	Central Java	
Kendal	Central Java	
Sukoharjo	Central Java	
Wonosobo	Central Java	
Wonogiri	Central Java	
Purworejo	Central Java	
Sragen	Central Java	
Klaten	Central Java	
Pemalang	Central Java	
Grobogan	Central Java	
Demak	Central Java	
Sleman	Yogyakarta Special Region	
Gunung Kidul	Yogyakarta Special Region	
Bantul	Yogyakarta Special Region	
Ngawi	East Java	
Jember	East Java	
Lamongan	East Java	
Ponorogo	East Java	
Blitar	East Java	
Situbondo	East Java	
Kediri	East Java	
Sumenep	East Java	
Gresik	East Java	
Malang	East Java	
Mojokerto	East Java	
Pacitan	East Java	
Trenggalek	East Java	
Sidoarjo	East Java	
Tuban	East Java	
Banyuwangi	East Java	
Karangasem	Bali	
Badung	Bali	
Bangli	Bali	
Tabanan	Bali	
Jembrana	Bali	
North Lombok	West Nusa Tenggara	
Central Lombok	West Nusa Tenggara	
Bima	West Nusa Tenggara	
West Sumbawa	West Nusa Tenggara	
Dompu	West Nusa Tenggara	
Sumbawa	West Nusa Tenggara	
Belu	East Nusa Tenggara	
Malaka	East Nusa Tenggara	
West Manggarai	East Nusa Tenggara	
East Sumba	East Nusa Tenggara	
West Sumba	East Nusa Tenggara	
Manggarai	East Nusa Tenggara	
Ngada	East Nusa Tenggara	
North Central Timor	East Nusa Tenggara	
Sabu Raijua	East Nusa Tenggara	
Kapuas Hulu	West Kalimantan	
Bengkayang	West Kalimantan	
Sekadau	West Kalimantan	
Melawi	West Kalimantan	
Sintang	West Kalimantan	
Ketapang	West Kalimantan	
Sambas	West Kalimantan	
Banjar	South Kalimantan	
Kota Baru	South Kalimantan	
Balangan	South Kalimantan	
Central Hulu Sungai	South Kalimantan	
Tanah Bumbu	South Kalimantan	
East Kotawaringin	East Kalimantan	
Mahakam Ulu	East Kalimantan	
Kutai Kartanegara	East Kalimantan	
Paser	East Kalimantan	
Berau	East Kalimantan	
East Kutai	East Kalimantan	
West Kutai	East Kalimantan	
Tana Tidung	East Kalimantan	
Bulungan	North Kalimantan	
Malinau	North Kalimantan	details
Nunukan	North Kalimantan	
Pangkajene and Islands	South Sulawesi	
Barru	South Sulawesi	
Gowa	South Sulawesi	
Maros	South Sulawesi	
East Luwu	South Sulawesi	
Tana Toraja	South Sulawesi	
Selayar Islands	South Sulawesi	
Soppeng	South Sulawesi	
North Luwu	South Sulawesi	
Bulukumba	South Sulawesi	
North Toraja	South Sulawesi	
Banggai Laut	Central Sulawesi	
Tojo Una-Una	Central Sulawesi	
Poso	Central Sulawesi	
Tolitoli	Central Sulawesi	
North Morowali	Central Sulawesi	
Sigi	Central Sulawesi	
Banggai	Central Sulawesi	
Central Mamuju	West Sulawesi	
Pasangkayu	West Sulawesi	
Mamuju	West Sulawesi	
Majene	West Sulawesi	
East Kolaka	Southeast Sulawesi	
North Buton	Southeast Sulawesi	
South Konawe	Southeast Sulawesi	
North Konawe	Southeast Sulawesi	
Konawe Islands	Southeast Sulawesi	
Muna	Southeast Sulawesi	
Wakatobi	Southeast Sulawesi	
East Bolaang Mongondow	North Sulawesi	
South Bolaang Mongondow	North Sulawesi	
North Minahasa	North Sulawesi	
South Minahasa	North Sulawesi	
Gorontalo	Gorontalo	
Bone Bolango	Gorontalo	
Pohuwato	Gorontalo	
Aru Islands	Maluku	
East Seram	Maluku	
Southwest Maluku	Maluku	
South Buru	Maluku	
Taliabu Island	North Maluku	
East Halmahera	North Maluku	
Sula Islands	North Maluku	
North Halmahera	North Maluku	
South Halmahera	North Maluku	
West Halmahera	North Maluku	
South Manokwari	West Papua	
South Sorong	West Papua	
Raja Ampat	West Papua	
Kaimana	West Papua	
Teluk Bintuni	West Papua	
Fakfak	West Papua	
Teluk Wondama	West Papua	
Manokwari	West Papua	
Nabire	Papua	
Asmat	Papua	
Keerom	Papua	
Waropen	Papua	
Merauke	Papua	
Mamberamo Raya	Papua	
Boven Digoel	Papua	
Pegunungan Bintang	Papua	
Yahukimo	Papua	
Supiori	Papua	
Yalimo	Papua	
Arfak Mountains	Papua	
