= 2020 Malinau regency election =

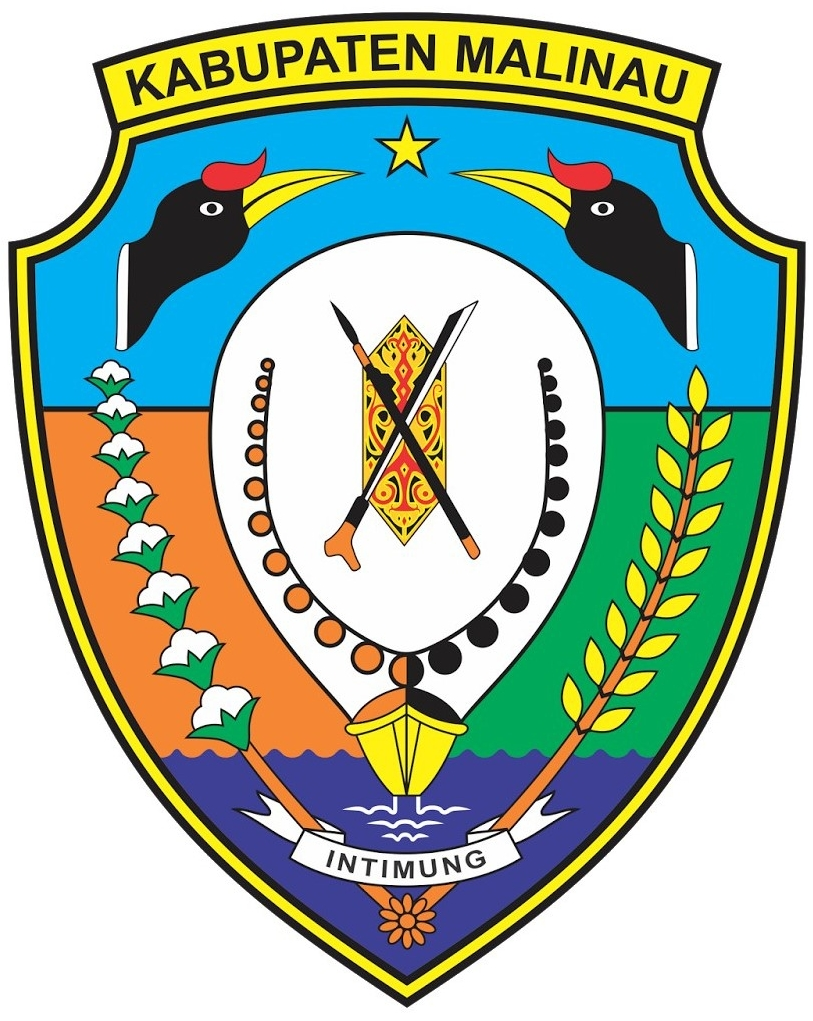
| ← 2015 | 9 December 2020 | 2024 → |
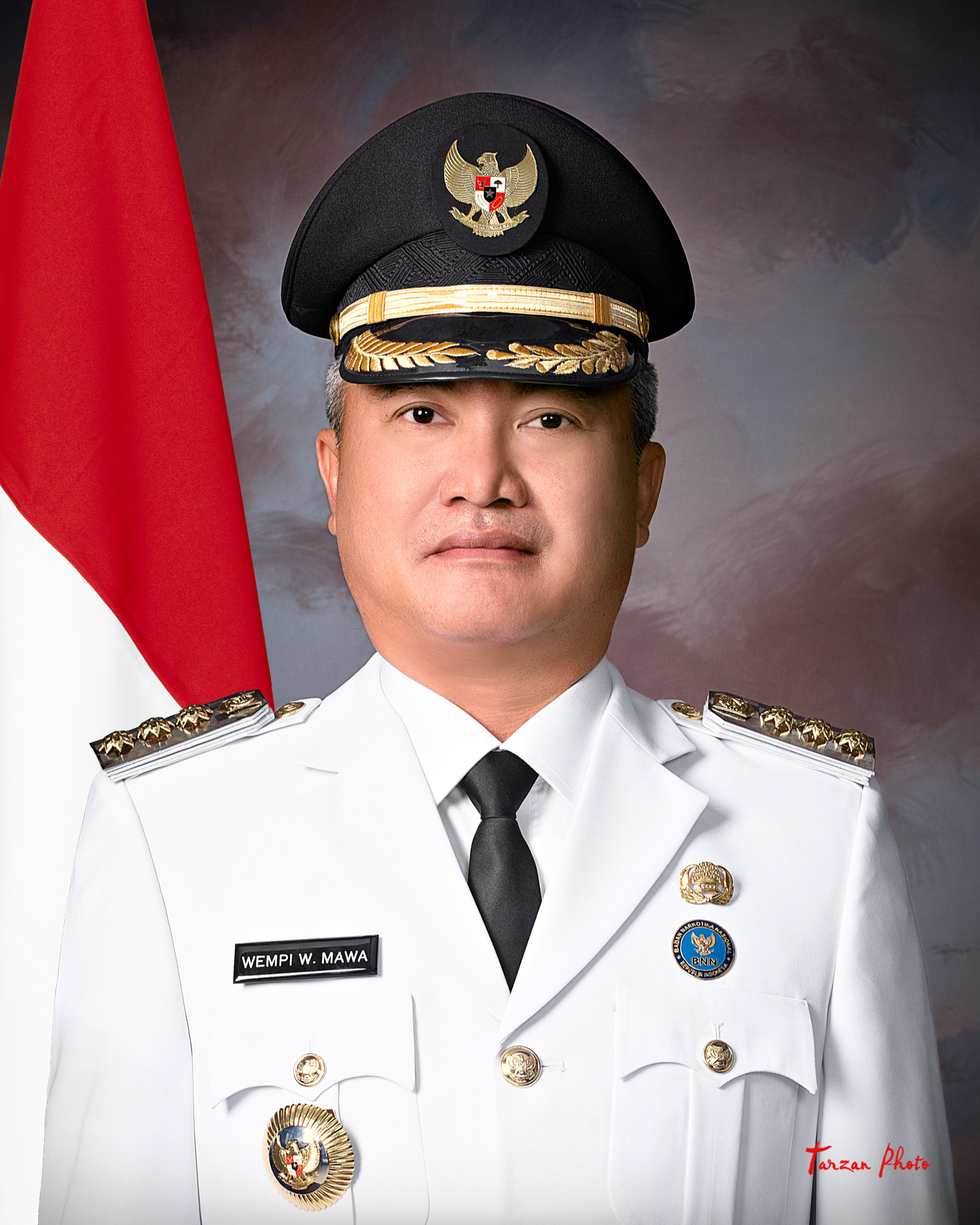

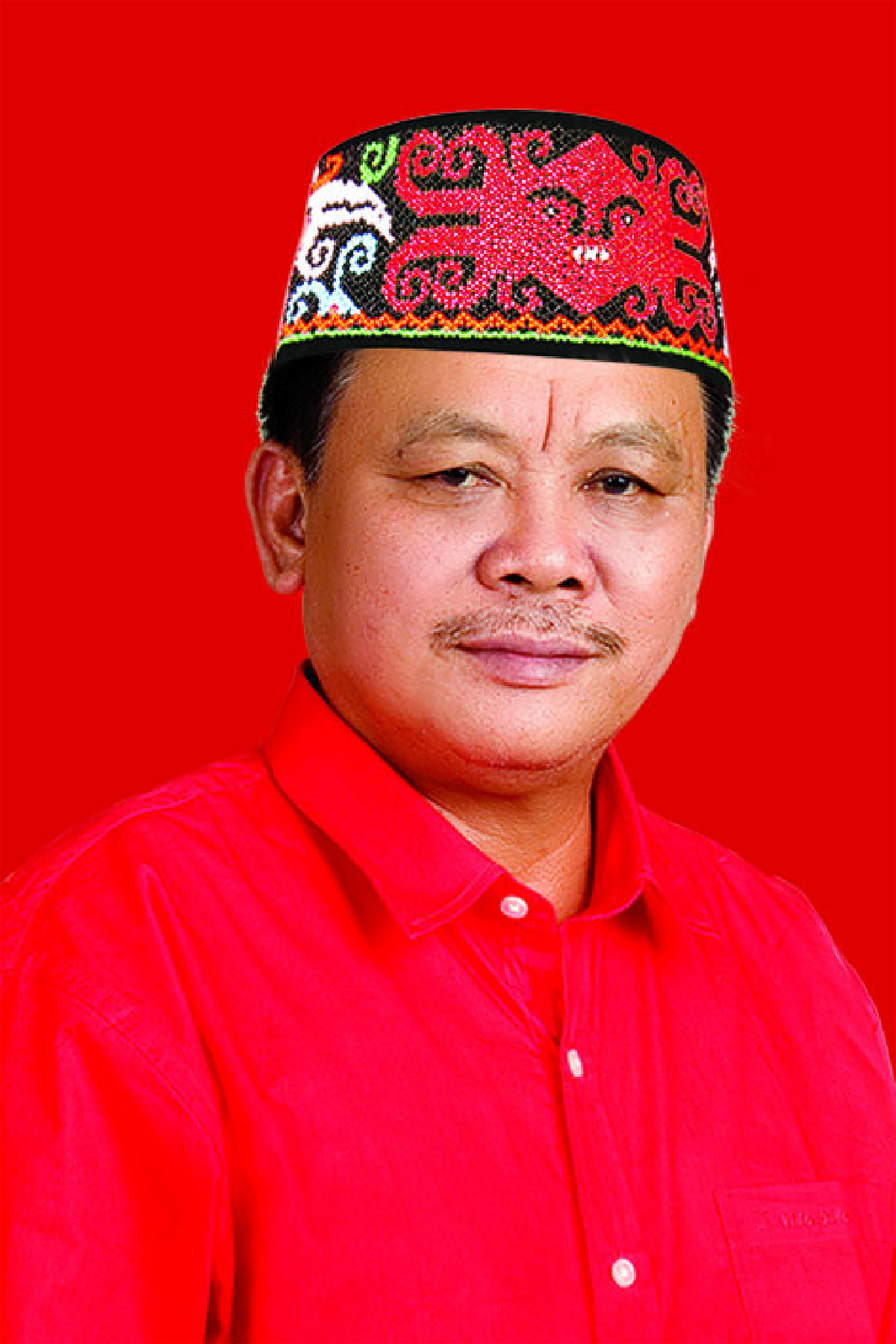

| Candidate | Wempi Wellem Mawa | Jhonny Laing Impang | Martin Labo |
| Party | Demokrat | PDI-P | Golkar |
| Running mate | Jakaria | Muhrim | Datuk Mohammad Nasir |
| Popular vote | 19,807 | 13,144 | 9,757 |
| Percentage | 46.38% | 30.78% | 22.85% |
Regent before election
Yansen Tipa Padan
Demokrat
Elected Regent
Wempi Wellem Mawa
Demokrat

The 2020 Malinau regency election was held on 9 December 2020 to elect both regent and vice-regent of Malinau Regency for the 2021–2024 term. The election was held alongside simultaneous local elections across Indonesia.

The incumbent regent, Yansen Tipa Padan, was ineligible to run for re-election, instead he was elected vice governor of North Kalimantan under Governor Zainal Arifin Paliwang in the concurrent gubernatorial election. In total, three candidates were on the ballot. Wempi Wellem Mawa of the Democratic Party was elected regent, defeating Jhonny Laing Impang of the Indonesian Democratic Party of Struggle and Martin Labo of Golkar.

== Results ==
1. Wempi-Jakaria 46.38 (46.4%)
2. Laing-Muhrim 30.78 (30.8%)
3. Martin-Nasir 22.85 (22.8%)

| Candidate | Running mate | Party | Votes | % |
|---|---|---|---|---|
| Wempi Wellem Mawa | Jakaria | Demokrat | 19,807 | 46.38 |
| Jhonny Laing Impang | Muhrim | PDI-P | 13,144 | 30.78 |
| Martin Labo | Datuk Mohammad Nasir | Golkar | 9,757 | 22.85 |
| Total | | | 42,708 | 100.00 |
Source: KPU

=== Results by districts ===
| District | Martin-Nasir | | Laing-Muhrim | | Wempi-Jakaria | | Total |
| District | Votes | % | Votes | % | Votes | % | Total |
|---|---|---|---|---|---|---|---|
| Bahau Hulu | 199 | 27.52% | 309 | 42.74% | 215 | 29.74% | 723 |
| Kayan Hilir | 255 | 29.11% | 178 | 20.32% | 443 | 50.57% | 876 |
| Kayan Hulu | 575 | 41.43% | 183 | 13.18% | 630 | 45.39% | 1,388 |
| Kayan Selatan | 298 | 24.79% | 253 | 21.05% | 651 | 54.16% | 1,202 |
| Malinau Barat | 2,532 | 41.53% | 842 | 13.81% | 2,723 | 44.66% | 6,097 |
| Malinau Kota | 3,965 | 32.08% | 3,194 | 25.84% | 5,200 | 42.07% | 12,359 |
| Malinau Selatan | 507 | 18.02% | 1,297 | 46.11% | 1,009 | 35.87% | 2,813 |
| Malinau Selatan Hilir | 549 | 31.14% | 303 | 17.19% | 911 | 51.67% | 1,763 |
| Malinau Selatan Hulu | 327 | 22.35% | 418 | 28.57% | 718 | 49.08% | 1,463 |
| Malinau Utara | 1,794 | 24.52% | 1,954 | 26.71% | 3,568 | 48.77% | 7,316 |
| Mentarang | 1,112 | 32.06% | 317 | 9.14% | 2,040 | 58.81% | 3,469 |
| Mentarang Hulu | 116 | 22.35% | 21 | 4.05% | 382 | 73.60% | 519 |
| Pujungan | 267 | 28.71% | 198 | 21.29% | 465 | 50.00% | 930 |
| Sungai Boh | 556 | 43.78% | 220 | 17.32% | 494 | 38.90% | 1,270 |
| Sungai Tubu | 92 | 17.69% | 70 | 13.46% | 358 | 68.85% | 520 |
| Total | 13,144 | 30.78% | 9,757 | 22.85% | 19,807 | 46.38% | 42,708 |
Source: KPU
