= Yulius Selvanus =

Indonesian politician and military officer

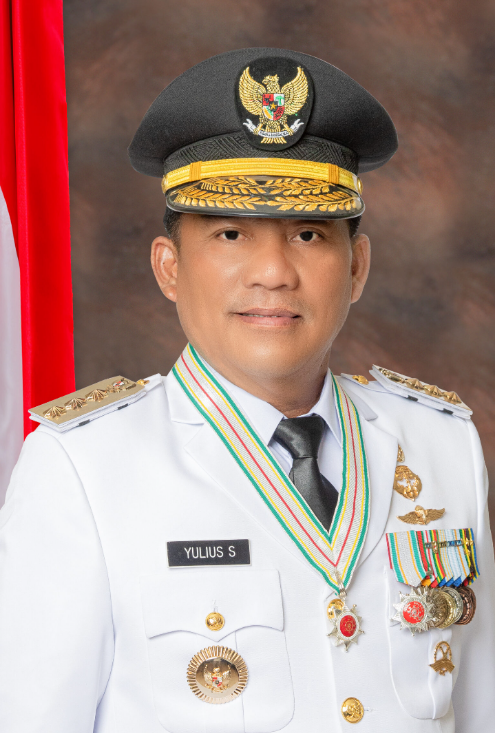
- Official portrait, 2025

Governor of North Sulawesi
- Incumbent
- Assumed office 20 February 2025
- Deputy: Victor Mailangkay
- Preceded by: Olly Dondokambey

Personal details
- Born: 17 September 1963 (age 62) Semarang, Central Java, Indonesia
- Party: Gerindra
- Spouse: Anik Fitri Wandriani
- Children: 3
- Parents: Daud Lumbaa (father); Gysye Komaling (mother)

Military service
- Branch/service: Indonesian Army
- Years of service: 1988–2021
- Rank: Major general

Yulius Selvanus (born 17 September 1963) is an Indonesian politician and former military officer who is the governor of North Sulawesi, serving since February 2025. He is a member of the Gerindra Party, and was part of the Kopassus special forces unit for most of his time in the Indonesian Army. He held the rank of major general upon his retirement from active service in 2021.

Graduating from the Indonesian Military Academy in 1988, Yulius joined the Kopassus special forces. He was part of Tim Mawar, a group of Kopassus soldiers assigned to kidnap democracy activists in 1997–1998. He was imprisoned for 20 months in military prison for his involvement in the kidnappings, but returned to Kopassus afterwards and rose through the ranks. Eventually, he reached the rank of major general before his retirement in 2021. He then joined former Kopassus commander Prabowo Subianto's Gerindra Party, and was elected governor of North Sulawesi in 2024.

== Early life ==
Yulius Selvanus was born in Semarang, Central Java on 17 September 1963. His father, Daud Lumbaa, is of Torajan descent from Tana Toraja Regency, South Sulawesi and had served in the Indonesian Air Force, while his mother, Gysye Komaling, worked as a nurse and originated from Minahasa in North Sulawesi. Yulius would use his parents' clan names (i.e. Lumbaa and Komaling) as part of his "personal branding". He spent his childhood at the town of Cepu, Blora. Yulius enrolled at the Indonesian Military Academy, graduating as part of the infantry branch in 1988.

== Career ==
=== Military ===
Yulius joined the Kopassus special forces. During the Asian financial crisis and the protests in the late 1990s, he was assigned to a small team of 11 Kopassus soldiers, known as Tim Mawar ("Team Rose"), which was ordered to kidnap activists. In a later statement, Yulius claimed that his actions as part of Tim Mawar was to "defend the dignity of the President". Following the fall of Suharto, Yulius (ranked captain) was put on military trial for his involvement in Tim Mawar, and in April 1999 was sentenced to 20 months in jail. He was also dismissed from his post in the armed forces. Following an appeal to the Supreme Military Court, his prison sentence was upheld, but his dismissal was overturned and he remained in service after his release. He was imprisoned at the Cimahi military prison.

By 2002, Yulius had returned to Kopassus and received a promotion to major. Yulius continued to the Indonesian Army Command and General Staff College (Seskoad), graduating in 2004, and by 2009 he was deputy commander of a Kopassus unit in Serang. By 2011, Yulius was a colonel, and was involved in suppressing a labor protest at the Grasberg mine. A clash ensued between the protesters and security forces (mostly Indonesian Police), resulting in the deaths of two protesters. In 2016, he was assigned to head the Indonesian State Intelligence Agency in the Riau Islands, and was promoted to brigadier general. This appointment led to criticism from KontraS' Haris Azhar. He then became commander of the Sorong military area in 2019.

Then-Minister of Defence Prabowo Subianto (Kopassus commander during the kidnappings) would provide a recommendation letter for Yulius in 2020, which resulted in President Joko Widodo assigning Yulius as head of the strategic installations agency within the Ministry of Defence. Yulius's appointment resulted in widespread criticism from human rights activists. This appointment also resulted in Yulius being promoted to major general. Yulius retired from the Army on 1 October 2021, and was appointed as a special assistant to the Minister of Defence five days later.

=== Governor ===
In 2024, Prabowo Subianto's party Gerindra endorsed Yulius to run in the 2024 North Sulawesi gubernatorial election. He was further backed by a coalition of other nine parties, including Nasdem, PKB, and PAN. Nasdem politician and provincial legislator Victor Mailangkay was his running mate. In the ensuing three-way race, Yulius won 539,039 votes (36.9%), defeating PDI-P candidate Steven Kandouw. North Sulawesi had previously been considered a PDI-P stronghold. Yulius and Mailangkay were sworn in, along with most other regional leaders elected in 2024, on 20 February 2025.

As governor, Selvanus pushed for the opening of a flight route from Manado to Tana Toraja to boost tourism. He also promoted a Pekarangan farming program to boost local food self-suffiency.

== Personal life ==
He is married to Anik Fitri Wandriani, and the couple has three sons. Anik is listed as president for the security company PT Mawar Sebelas (Mawar 11), and also operates a health clinic. Their eldest son, Standius Bara Prima Lumbaa, ran for a seat in the Banten Regional House of Representatives as a Gerindra candidate in 2024, but was not elected. Yulius is also active in chess organizations, being deputy chairman of the Indonesian Chess Federation and sponsoring the chess tournament Mawar 11 Cup.
