= 2024 North Kalimantan gubernatorial election =

- 27 November 2024
- Turnout: 68.05% (▼5.97 pp)
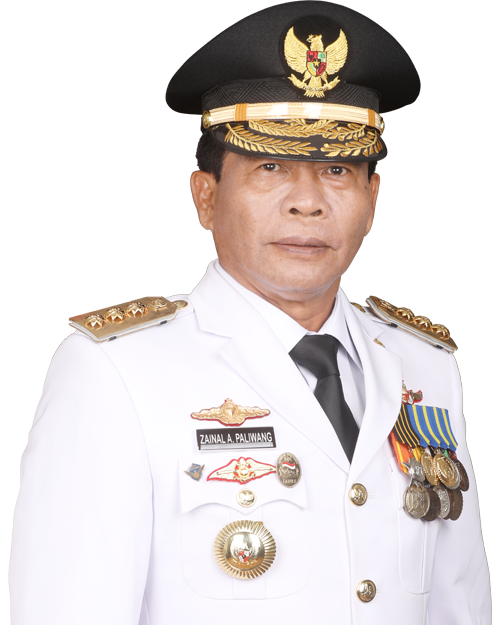

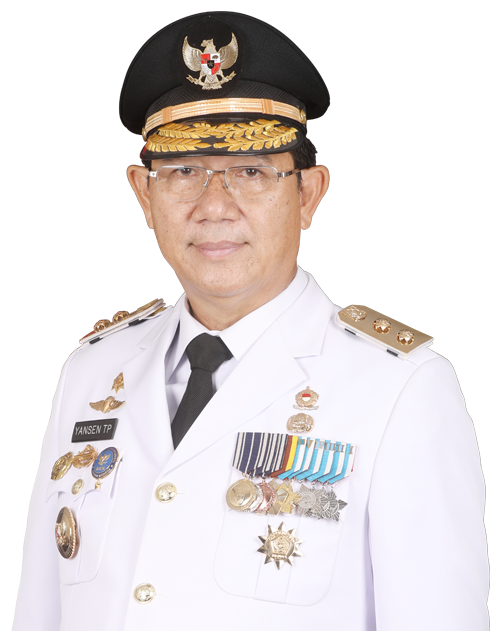

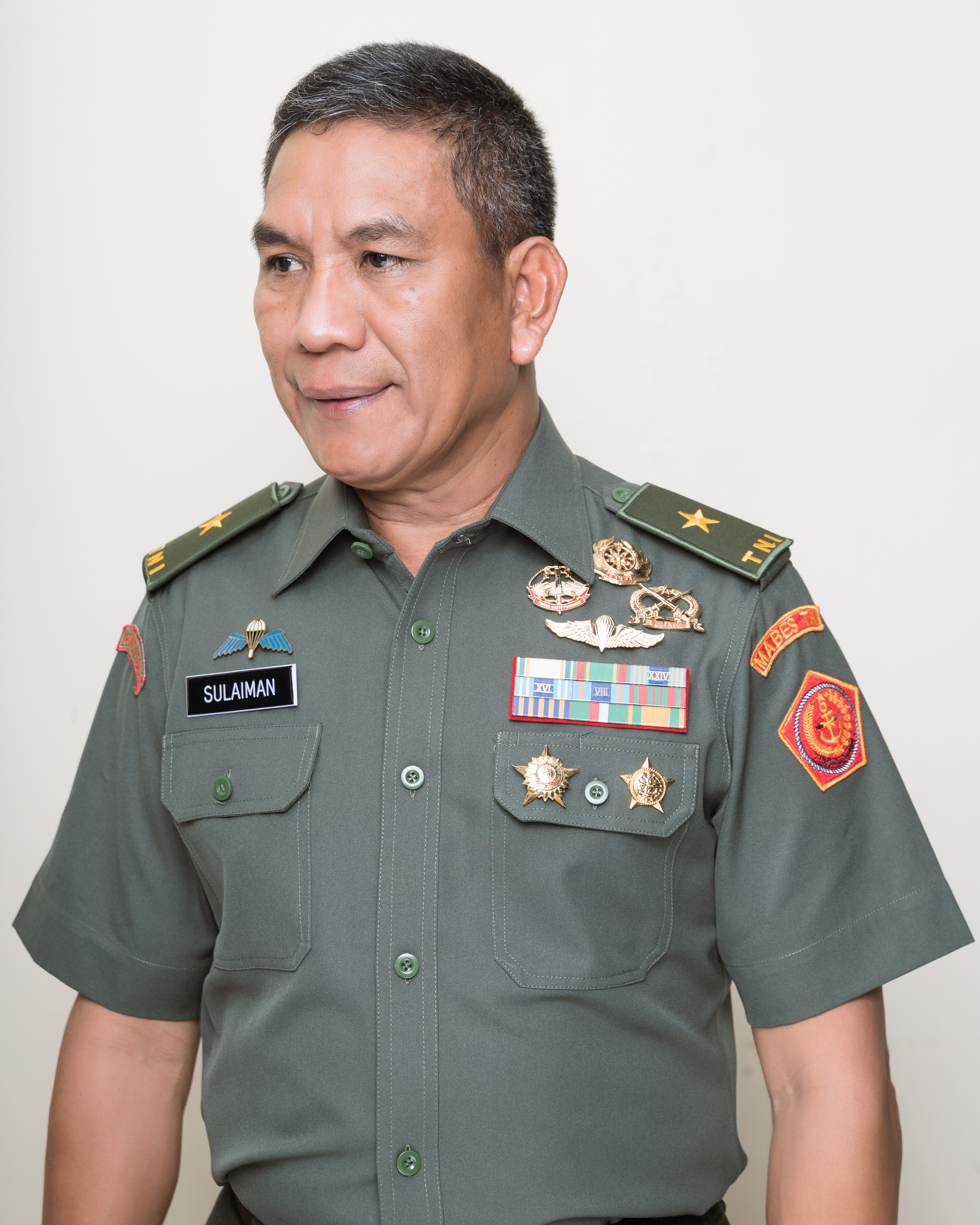
Candidate	Zainal Arifin Paliwang	Yansen Tipa Padan	Andi Sulaiman
Party	Gerindra	Demokrat	PDI-P
Alliance	KIM Plus
Running mate	Ingkong Ala	Suratno	Adri Patton
Popular vote	194,021	97,244	40,228
Percentage	58.53%	29.34%	12.14%
- Results by district
Governor before election
Zainal Arifin Paliwang
Gerindra
Elected Governor
Zainal Arifin Paliwang
Gerindra

The 2024 North Kalimantan gubernatorial election was held on 27 November 2024 to elect the governor and vice governor of North Kalimantan for a five-year term. They were held as part of local elections across Indonesia. The incumbent, Zainal Arifin Paliwang, was re-elected in a landslide with over 58% of the vote.

Supported by Gerindra and the KIM Plus coalition, Zainal defeated two candidates in the race, including his own vice governor, Yansen Tipa Padan, and a retired general, Andi Sulaiman. The former was backed by Demokrat, PKB, and PPP; the latter was backed by PDI-P and PAN.

== Electoral system ==
The 2024 gubernatorial election, like all other local elections in 2024, followed the first-past-the-post electoral system, wherein the candidate with the most votes wins the election, even if they do not win a majority. It is possible for a candidate to run uncontested, in which case the candidate is still required to win a majority of votes "against" an "empty box" option. Should the candidate fail to do so, the election will be repeated on a later date.

== Candidates ==
According to electoral regulations, in order to qualify for the election, candidates were required to secure the support of a political party or a coalition of parties controlling at least 7 seats (amounting to 20% of all seats) in the North Kalimantan Regional House of Representatives (DPRD). As no parties won 7 or more seats in the 2024 legislative election, parties are required to form coalitions to nominate a candidate.

Alternatively, candidates could run as an independent if they demonstrated enough support in the form of photocopies of identity cards. In the case of North Kalimantan, this corresponds to 50,426 copies. No independent candidates registered with the General Elections Commission (KPU) prior to the set deadline of 12 May 2024.

=== Potential ===
The following are individuals who have either been publicly mentioned as a potential candidate by a political party in the DPRD, publicly declared their candidacy with press coverage, or considered as a potential candidate by media outlets:

- Zainal Arifin Paliwang (Gerindra), incumbent governor.
- Yansen Tipa Padan (Demokrat), incumbent vice governor.
- Andi Sulaiman, former head of the North Kalimantan office of the State Intelligence Agency.
- Immanuel Ebenezer (Gerindra), former leader in the Prabowo Subianto 2024 presidential campaign.

== Political map ==
Following the 2024 Indonesian legislative election, ten political parties are represented in the North Kalimantan DPRD:

Political parties	Seat count
Great Indonesia Movement Party (Gerindra)	6 / 35
Party of Functional Groups (Golkar)	6 / 35
Democratic Party (Demokrat)	6 / 35
Prosperous Justice Party (PKS)	4 / 35
Indonesian Democratic Party of Struggle (PDI-P)	3 / 35
People's Conscience Party (Hanura)	3 / 35
NasDem Party	2 / 35
National Awakening Party (PKB)	2 / 35
National Mandate Party (PAN)	2 / 35
United Development Party (PPP)	1 / 35

== Results ==
Candidate	Running mate	Party	Votes	%
Zainal Arifin Paliwang	Ingkong Ala	Gerindra	194,021	58.53
Yansen Tipa Padan	Suratno	Demokrat	97,244	29.34
Andi Sulaiman	Adri Patton	PDI-P	40,228	12.14
Total			331,493	100.00
Valid votes			331,493	93.92
Invalid/blank votes			21,447	6.08
Total votes			352,940	100.00
Registered voters/turnout			518,612	68.05
Source: General Elections Commission
