= 2024 North Sulawesi gubernatorial election =

- 27 November 2024
- Turnout: 76.96% (▼1.47pp)
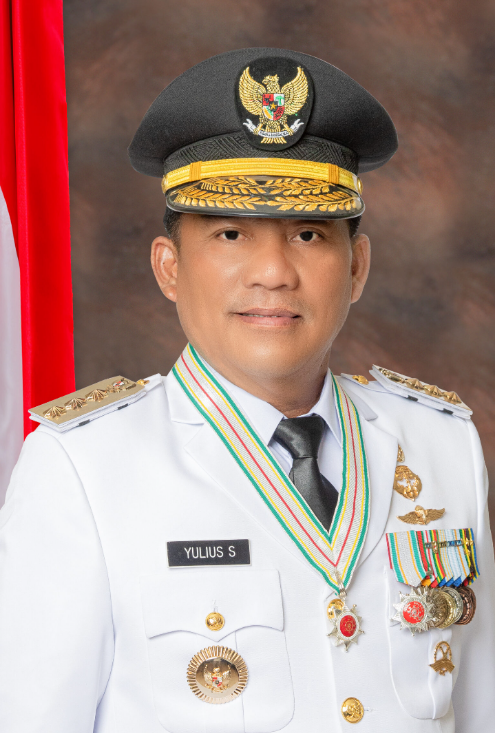

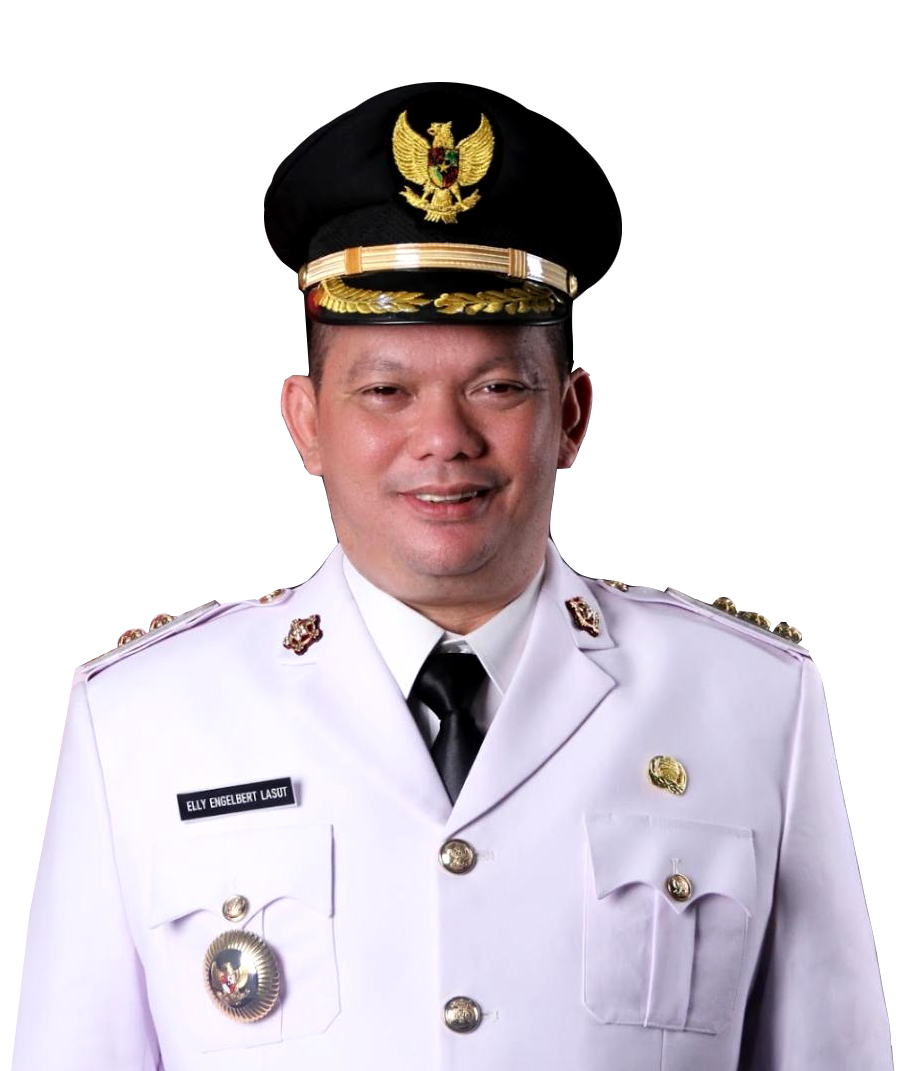

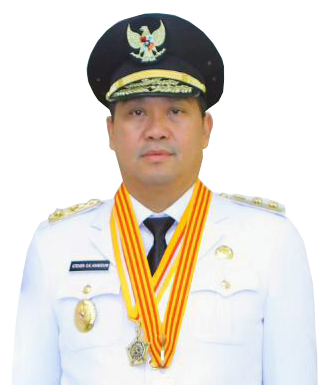
Candidate	Yulius Selvanus	Elly Engelbert Lasut	Steven Kandouw
Party	Gerindra	Demokrat	PDI-P
Alliance	KIM Plus	–	–
Running mate	Victor Mailangkay	Hanny Joost Pajouw	Alfred Denny Djoike Tuejeh
popular vote	539,039	463,433	459,673
Percentage	36.87%	31.70%	31.44%
Governor before election
Olly Dondokambey
PDI-P
Elected Governor
Yulius Selvanus
Gerindra

The 2024 North Sulawesi gubernatorial election was held on 27 November 2024 to elect the governor of North Sulawesi for a five-year term. They were held as part of local elections across Indonesia. The previous election was held in 2020. The election was won by Yulius Selvanus of the Gerindra Party with 36% of the vote. He defeated the Democratic Party's Elly Engelbert Lasut, who placed second, and Steven Kandouw of the Indonesian Democratic Party of Struggle (PDI-P).

== Electoral system ==
The election, like other local elections in 2024, follow the first-past-the-post system where the candidate with the most votes wins the election, even if they do not win a majority. It is possible for a candidate to run uncontested, in which case the candidate is still required to win a majority of votes "against" an "empty box" option. Should the candidate fail to do so, the election will be repeated on a later date.

== Candidates ==
According to electoral regulations, in order to qualify for the election, candidates are required to secure support from a political party or a coalition of parties controlling 9 seats (20 percent of all seats) in the North Sulawesi Regional House of Representatives (DPRD). The Indonesian Democratic Party of Struggle, with 19 seats, is the only party eligible to nominate a candidate without forming a coalition with other parties. However, following a Constitutional Court of Indonesia decision in August 2024, the political support required to nominate a candidate was lowered to between 6.5 and 10 percent of the popular vote. Candidates may alternatively demonstrate support to run as an independent in form of photocopies of identity cards, which in North Sulawesi's case corresponds to 196,960 copies. Elly Engelbert Lasut, the regent of Talaud Islands and a Demokrat politician, registered to run as an independent candidate, but failed to submit enough proofs of support.

The incumbent governor, Olly Dondokambey, had served two terms and was therefore ineligible to run in the election.

=== Potential ===
The following are individuals who have either been publicly mentioned as a potential candidate by a political party in the DPRD, publicly declared their candidacy with press coverage, or considered as a potential candidate by media outlets:

- Steven Kandouw (PDI-P), incumbent vice governor.
- Elly Engelbert Lasut (Demokrat, regent of the Talaud Islands.
- Alfred Denny Djoike Tuejeh, former commander of Kodam XIII/Merdeka which included North Sulawesi.
- Wanti Waranei Franky Mamahit, former commander of Kodam XIII/Merdeka.
- Carlo Brix Tewu, former head of North Sulawesi's regional police.

== Political map ==
Following the 2024 Indonesian legislative election, nine political parties are represented in the North Sulawesi DPRD:

Political parties	Seat count
Indonesian Democratic Party of Struggle (PDI-P)	19 / 45
Party of Functional Groups (Golkar)	6 / 45
NasDem Party	6 / 45
Democratic Party (Demokrat)	6 / 45
Great Indonesia Movement Party (Gerindra)	4 / 45
Prosperous Justice Party (PKS)	1 / 45
National Awakening Party (PKB)	1 / 45
Indonesian Solidarity Party (PSI)	1 / 45
Perindo Party	1 / 45

== Results ==
Candidate	Running mate	Party	Votes	%
Yulius Selvanus	Victor Mailangkay	Gerindra Party	539,039	36.87
Elly Engelbert Lasut	Hanny Joost Pajouw	Democratic Party	463,433	31.70
Steven Kandouw	Alfred Denny Djoike Tuejeh	Indonesian Democratic Party of Struggle	459,673	31.44
Total			1,462,145	100.00
Valid votes			1,462,145	97.41
Invalid/blank votes			38,916	2.59
Total votes			1,501,061	100.00
Registered voters/turnout			1,950,484	76.96
Source: KPU
