= 2020 North Sulawesi gubernatorial election =

| ← 2015 | 9 December 2020 | 2024 → |
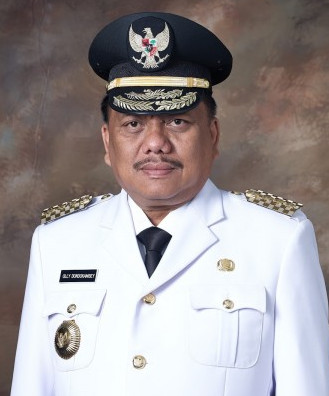

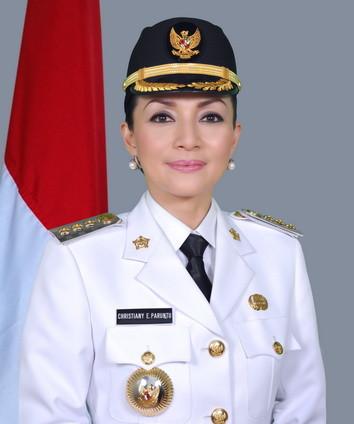

| Candidate | Olly Dondokambey | Christiany Eugenia Paruntu | Vonnie Anneke Panambunan |
| Party | PDI-P | Golkar | NasDem |
| Running mate | Steven Kandouw | Sehan Salim Landjar | Hendry Runtuwene |
| Popular vote | 821,503 | 491,457 | 125,627 |
| Percentage | 57.10% | 34.16% | 8.73% |
- Results by city/regency
Governor before election
Olly Dondokambey
PDI-P
Elected Governor
Olly Dondokambey
PDI-P

The 2020 North Sulawesi gubernatorial election was held on 9 December 2020 to elect both the governor and vice-governor of North Sulawesi as part of local elections across Indonesia. The incumbent governor, Olly Dondokambey, won re-election to a second term.

== Results ==
| Candidate | Running mate | Party | Votes | % |
|---|---|---|---|---|
| Olly Dondokambey | Steven Kandouw | PDI-P | 821,503 | 57.10 |
| Christiany Eugenia Paruntu | Sehan Salim Landjar | Golkar | 491,457 | 34.16 |
| Vonnie Anneke Panambunan | Hendry Runtuwene | NasDem | 125,627 | 8.73 |
| Total | | | 1,438,587 | 100.00 |
| Valid votes | | | 1,438,587 | 98.36 |
| Invalid/blank votes | | | 24,018 | 1.64 |
| Total votes | | | 1,462,605 | 100.00 |
| Registered voters/turnout | | | 1,864,883 | 78.43 |
Source: General Elections Commission
