= 1997–98 activists kidnappings in Indonesia =

Disappearances of pro-democracy activists

1997–1998 activists kidnappings in Indonesia
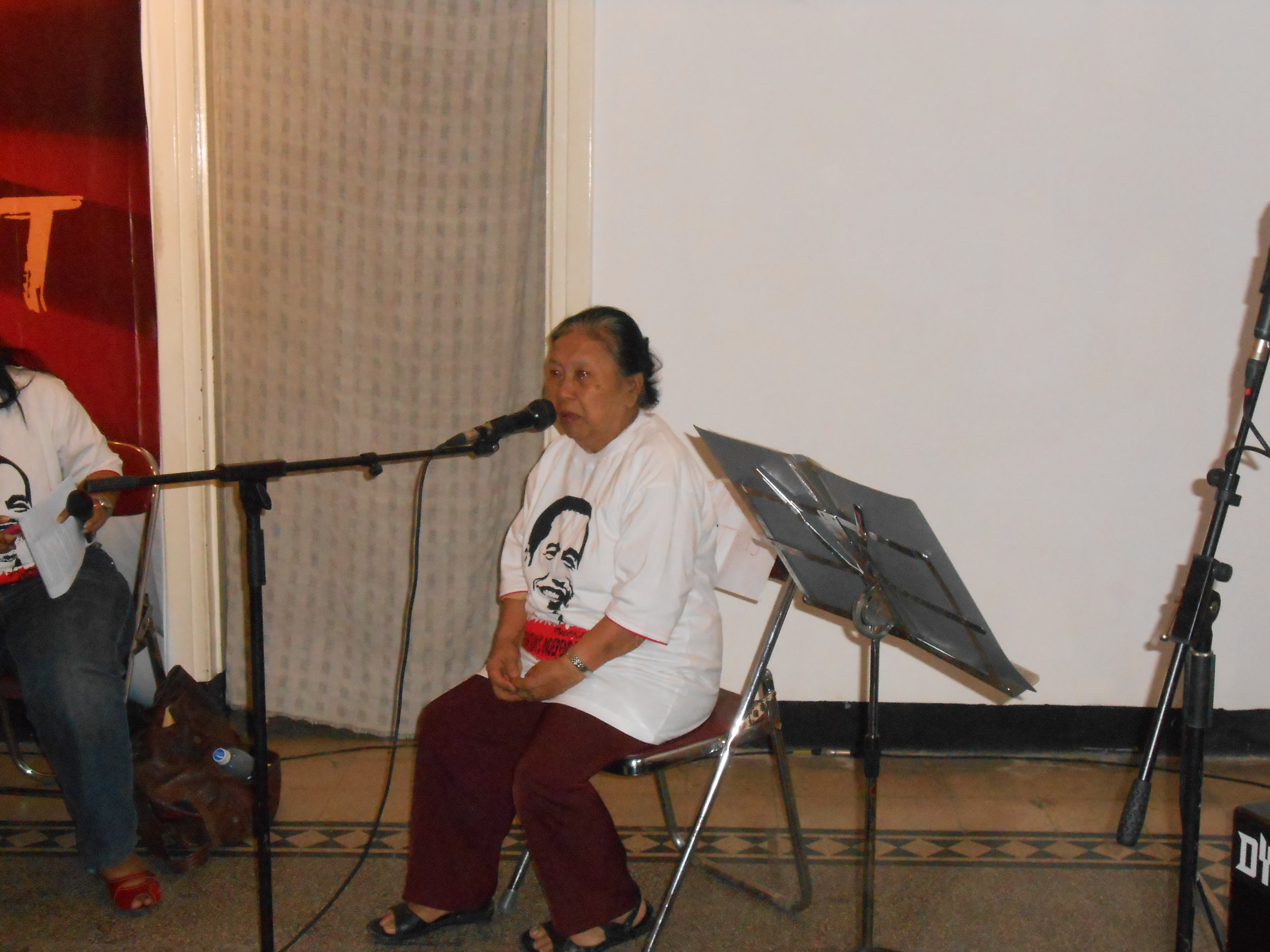
- The mother of one of the missing activists speaks at a student event for the 2014 presidential elections in Surabaya.
- Location: Indonesia
- Date: 1997–1998
- Target: Youth leaders, protesters and pro-democracy leaders
- Attack type: Forced disappearance
- Victims: 23 (1 dead, 9 released, 13 missing)

The 1997–1998 activists kidnappings were abductions of pro-democracy activists which happened between the 1997 Indonesian Legislative Election and the fall of Suharto in 1998. The kidnappings took place in three different phases: before the May 1997 Indonesian legislative elections, two months before the People's Consultative Assembly (MPR) session in March 1998 and in the period just before Soeharto's 21 May resignation. None of those abducted during the first and third period have reappeared. Some of the activists who were abducted in the second period have openly spoken about their experiences.

== Background ==
=== New Order ===
The New Order (Indonesian: Orde Baru) is the term coined by the second Indonesian President Suharto to characterize his regime as he came to power in 1966. Suharto used this term to contrast his rule with that of his predecessor, Sukarno (dubbed the "Old Order," or Orde Lama). The term "New Order" in more recent times has become synonymous with the Suharto years (1965–1998).

Immediately following the attempted coup in 1965, the political situation was uncertain, but the Suharto's New Order found much popular support from groups wanting a separation from Indonesia's problems since its independence. The 'generation of 66' (Angkatan 66) epitomized talk of a new group of young leaders and new intellectual thought. Following Indonesia's communal and political conflicts, and its economic collapse and social breakdown of the late 1950s through to the mid-1960s, the "New Order" was committed to achieving and maintaining political order, economic development, and the removal of mass participation in the political process. The features of the "New Order" established from the late 1960s were thus a strong political role for the military, the bureaucratization and corporatization of political and societal organizations, and selective but effective repression of opponents. Strident anti-communism remained a hallmark of the regime for its subsequent 32 years.

Within a few years, however, many of its original allies had become indifferent or averse to the New Order, which comprised a military faction supported by a narrow civilian group. Among much of the pro-democracy movement which forced Suharto to resign in the 1998 Indonesian Revolution and then gained power, the term "New Order" has come to be used pejoratively. It is frequently employed to describe figures who were either tied to the Suharto period, or who upheld the practises of his authoritarian regime, such as corruption, collusion and nepotism (widely known by the acronym KKN: korupsi, kolusi, nepotisme).

=== Pro-democracy movement ===
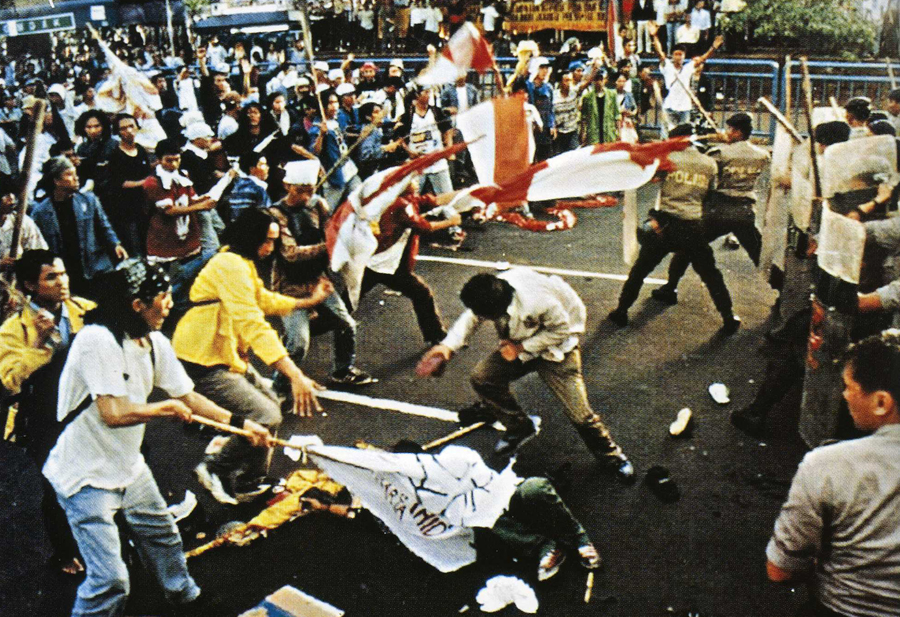
University students and police forces clash in May 1998.

In 1996 Suharto undertook efforts to pre-empt a challenge to the New Order government. The Indonesian Democratic Party (PDI), a legal party that had traditionally propped up the regime had changed direction, and began to assert its independence. Suharto fostered a split over the leadership of PDI, backing a co-opted faction loyal to deputy speaker of the People's Representative Council Suryadi against a faction loyal to Megawati Sukarnoputri, the daughter of Sukarno and the PDI's chairperson.

After the Suryadi faction announced a party congress to sack Megawati would be held in Medan on June 20–22, Megawati proclaimed that her supporters would hold demonstrations in protest. The Suryadi faction went through with its sacking of Megawati, and the demonstrations manifested themselves throughout Indonesia. This led to several confrontations on the streets between protesters and security forces, and recriminations over the violence. The protests culminated in the military allowing Megawati's supporters to take over PDI headquarters in Jakarta, with a pledge of no further demonstrations.

Suharto allowed the occupation of PDI headquarters to go on for almost a month, as attentions were also on Jakarta due to a set of high-profile ASEAN meetings scheduled to take place there. Capitalizing on this, Megawati supporters organized "democracy forums" with several speakers at the site. On July 26, officers of the military, Suryadi, and Suharto openly aired their disgust with the forums.

On July 27, police, soldiers, and people claiming to be Suryadi supporters stormed the headquarters. Several Megawati supporters were killed, and over two-hundred arrested and tried under the Anti-Subversion and Hate-Spreading laws. The day would become known as "Black Saturday" and mark the beginning of a renewed crackdown by the New Order government against supporters of democracy, now called the "Reformasi" or Reformation.

== Kidnappings ==
The 1997/1998 activists kidnapping were abductions of pro-democracy activists which happened between the 1997 Indonesian Legislative Election and the fall of Suharto in 1998. The kidnappings took place in three different phases: before the May 1997 Indonesian legislative elections, two months before the People's Consultative Assembly (MPR) session in March 1998 and in the period just before Soeharto's 21 May resignation. None of those abducted during the first and third period have reappeared. Some of the activists who were abducted in the second period have openly spoken about their experiences.

Kingsbury explains that the activists were kidnapped "by members of Kopassus, then controlled by Prabowo, but sections of the army generally tolerated and in some cases even encouraged student protest". As an anonymous activist who was kidnapped and then released expressed, many of them were poisoned in an airless room after their detention. "Like in an underground room," he uttered, adding he was constantly tortured during his imprisonment. "If I'm not mistaken, I was imprisoned for seven days.

The kidnappings started in the early months of 1997, after the campaign for general election began and members of the PDIP disappeared, and continued until the May 1998 riots extending the forced disappearances to members of Indonesia Students Solidarity for Democracy. Kontras, the Indonesian Commission for "the Disappeared" and Victims of Violence, on its report "Progress Case Activists kidnapping in 1998" notes that "the kidnapping of Pius Lustrilanang, Desmond J Mahesa, Haryanto Taslam, Mugiyanto, Aan Rusdianto, Faisol Reza, Rahardja W Jati and Nezar Patria encouraged civil community movement to demand responsibility from the military which was considered the perpetrator". Some of the victims were released, but 13 are still missing. That is the case of Suyat, Yani Afri, Sonny, M.Yusuf, Noval Alkatiri, Dedy Hamdun, Ismail, Bimo Petrus, Abdun Naser, Hendra Hambali, Ucok Siahaan, Yadin Muhidin and Wiji Thukul.

Darma Putra considers that this kidnappings had the goal of suppressing anti-government movements. As she notes, many of the activists who were later released have been afraid of revealing their experiences publicly because they still feel threatened. In the profile published on Kontras's website,

"The victims were not only political parties, but also nearly all independent and community-based organizations. NGOs and student movements experienced cooptation and intimidation through increasingly brutal investigations, arrests and detentions. Some were done through "official" channels while others were conducted secretly and arbitrarily.

== Victims ==
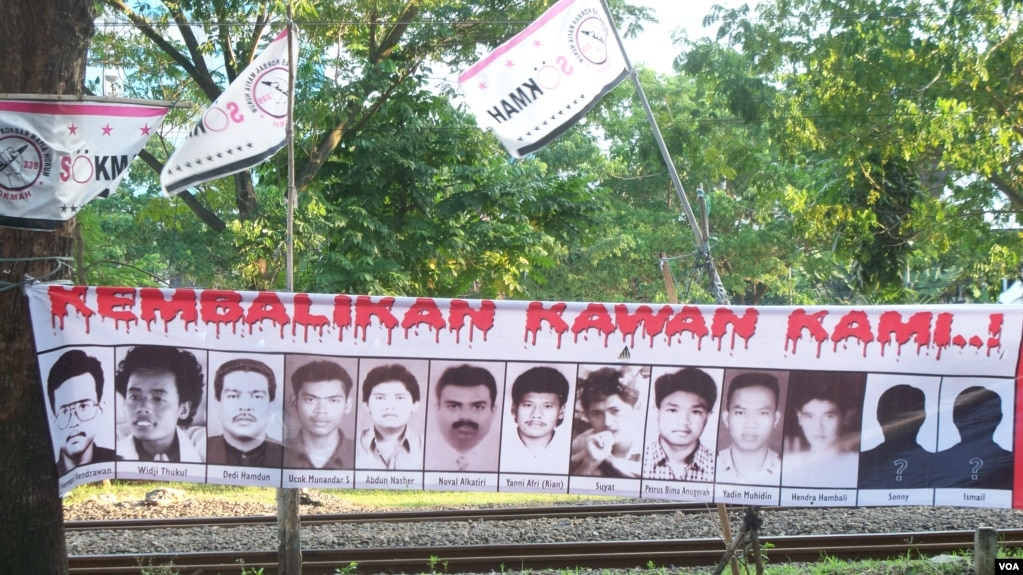
Poster with photos of 13 pro-democracy activists from 1997/1998 who are still missing.

During the period 1997/1998, Commission for the Disappeared and Victims of Violence (Komisi untuk Orang Hilang dan Korban Tindak Kekerasan, KontraS) reported that 23 people had been abducted by the state. Out of those 23 activists, one person was found dead (Leonardus Gilang), 9 released by their captors and 13 others are still missing to this day. The kidnappings occurred during the years when General Wiranto was the Defense Minister/Armed Forces Commander General.

The list of people who became victims included:

=== Activists who died ===
1. Leonardus Nugroho Islandar (Gilang) killed by an unknown person. The body was found in the Sarangan forest, Magetan in 5 June 1998.

=== Released activists ===
The nine activists who were released are:

1. Desmond Junaidi Mahesa, kidnapped at the Lembaga Bantuan Hukum Nusantara (Nusantara Legal Aid Institute), Jakarta, February 4, 1998.
2. Haryanto Taslam.
3. Rahardjo Walujo Djati, kidnapped at the Dr. Cipto Mangunkusumo Hospital (RSCM) after a press conference at the Legal Aid Foundation KNPD, Jakarta, March 12, 1998.
4. Pius Lustrilanang, kidnapped in front of RSCM after a press conference for the Legal Aid Institute in Jakarta, February 2, 1998
5. Faisol Reza, kidnapped in RSCM after press conference in Jakarta, March 12, 1998
6. Nezar Patria, kidnapped in the block of apartments Klender, March 13, 1998.
7. Aan Rusdianto, kidnapped in the block of apartmentents Klender, March 13, 1998.
8. Mugianto, kidnapped in the block of apartments Klender, March 13, 1998.
9. Andi Arief, kidnapped in Lampung, March 28, 1998.

=== Missing activists ===
The 13 activists who are still missing were members of various organizations, such as the People's Democratic Party or Partai Rakyat Demokratik, PDI Pro Mega, Mega Bintang, and students organisations:

1. Petrus Bimo Anugrah, Airlangga University and STF Driyarkara student; disappeared in Jakarta on March 30, 1998.
2. Herman Hendrawan, Airlangga University student; disappeared after a press conference at the Legal Aid Foundation KNPD in Jakarta, March 12, 1998.
3. Suyat, SMID activist; disappeared in Solo on February 12, 1998.
4. Wiji Thukul, poet, activist from the organisation Jaker; disappeared in Jakarta on January 10, 1998.
5. Yani Afri, driver, supporter of Megawati's PDI Pro Mega. After he joined the Mega Bintang coalition for the 1997 elections, he was arrested in Jakarta and disappeared on April 26, 1997.
6. Sonny, driver. He was friends with Yani Afri and also supporter of Megawati's PDI Pro Mega; disappeared in Jakarta on April 26, 1997.
7. Dedi Hamdun, businessman, active in the PPP and Mega Bintang 1997 campaign; disappeared in Jakarta on May 29, 1997.
8. Noval Al Katiri, PPP activist; disappeared in Jakarta on May 29, 1997.
9. Ismail; disappeared in Jakarta on May 29, 1997.
10. Mundandar Ucok Siahaan, student, kidnapped during the Jakarta riots on May 14, 1998.
11. Hendra Hambali, high school student; disappeared in Glodok, Jakarta, May 15, 1998.
12. Yadin Muhidin, Sailing School student; arrested by North Jakarta Police and disappeared on May 14, 1998.
13. Abdun Nasser, contractor; disappeared during the Jakarta riots on May 14, 1998.

== Kopassus ==
Kopassus is an Indonesian Army special forces group that conducts special operations missions for the Indonesian government, such as direct action, unconventional warfare, sabotage, counter-insurgency, counter-terrorism, and intelligence gathering. Kopassus was founded on April 16, 1952. It gained worldwide attention after several successful operations such as Indonesian invasion of East Timor and hostage release of Garuda Indonesia Flight 206.

The Special Forces have been a subject of controversy due to their role in the activists kidnappings in the period between 1997 and 1998. Mugiyanto, one of the activists who was kidnapped, as stated that the kidnapping and torture were carried out by the Indonesian special forces (Kopassus). Mugiyanto was kidnapped in Jakarta when he was going to meet other activists when he was kidnapped on March 13, 1998. He informed Vice News of what happened in an interview conducted in front of Kopassus headquarters in Jakarta.

Mugiyanto was in Jakarta to meet with other pro-democracy activists to organize protests against the government when he was taken on March 13, 1998. VICE News caught up with him outside the Kopassus headquarters. The location has a special meaning, as he affirms that years after being kidnapped he realised that "it was the Kopassus headquarters that I had been taken to". He also states that "some activists were taken directly to Kopassus, but not in my case". This testimony proves the direct responsibility of the Special Forces in these events.

According to the Federation of American Scientists, during the Officers' Honorary Council, on August 21, 1998, three senior officers from Kopassus, including the unit's former commander, Major General Prabowo Subianto, were questioned. As a consequence, the Armed forces chief General Wiranto admitted the involvement of Kopassus in the activists kidnappings. A year later, on April 6, 1999, "a military court found 11 members of Kopassus guilty and handed them jail terms of up to 22 months". According to an article published by The Jakarta Post on April 17, 2002 Kopassus members "have also been accused of taking part in the mass violence that occurred in East Timor after the historic independence ballot in the former Portuguese colony in September 1999".

In his book "Power Politics and the Indonesian Military", Damien Kingsbury states that Kopassus has been identified with "the perpetration of state terror, including a wide range of covert anticivilian activities and related human rights abuses, and as having the strongest political orientation". On December 30, 2010, Jay Griffiths published in the article 'Indonesia's slow motion genocide', Griffits stated that "Although the US Leahy Law forbids funding to military units that violate human rights, Kopassus is now being supported by President Obama, under the guise of fighting terrorism. The Kopassus document gives the lie to that, showing their systematic targeting of civilians."

== Team Mawar ==
The Team Mawar (Team Rose) is a small unit within the Kopassus Group IV, part of the Indonesian Army. This team is the alleged mastermind behind the pro-democracy activists kidnappings.

These events took 11 members of the Team Mawar to the Military High Court (Mahmilti II) in April 1999. Bambang Kristiono (Commander of the Team Mawar) was sentenced to 22 months in jail and expelled from the army. The court also sentenced the Infantry Captain Fausani Syahrial (FS) Deputy Commander Multhazar, Infantry Captain Sulistiyo Budi Nugroho, Infantry Captain Yulius Selvanus and Infantry Captain Budi Harto to 20 months in prison and discharged all of them from active service. However, years later Fausani Multhazar and Untung Budi Harto emerged as commanders of military districts in Central Java and the Maluku islands respectively. The officers appealed to the Supreme Court, whose verdict was never made public.

At the same time, six other soldiers were sentenced to one year and four months in prison but they kept their positions in the army. They were Infantry Captain Dada Hendra Yuda, Infantry Captain Djaka Budi Utama and Infantry Captain Fauka Noor Farid. Sergeant Sunaryo, Sergeant Sigit Sugianto and Sergeant Sukadi were sentenced to 1 year in prison. According to the confession of Mayor Bambang Kristiono, Commander of the Team Mawar, during the Military Tribunal, the person who ordered the activist abductions was Colonel Chairawan, but he was never brought to trial so it can not be confirmed.

An article published in 2007 by The South China Morning Post stated that "two members of the so-called Team Mawar have been promoted to important military posts". In the same article, Haris Azhar, from the Commission for Missing Persons and Victims of Violence, said that "the Team Mawar case was another example of the political establishment's reluctance to settle human rights abuses and pursue meaningful reform of the TNI".

=== Group IV ===
Team Mawar is a small unit within the Kopassus Group IV, part of the Indonesian Army. KOPASSUS has expanded to five Groups, with Group IV specifically handling intelligence operations along with the KOPASSUS Joint Intelligence Unit [SGI]. This team is the alleged mastermind behind the pro-democracy activists kidnappings. Group IV comprises approximately 800 men who work with the Joint Intelligence Unit on interrogations and domestic clandestine operations. These operations include the majority of Kopassus' most controversial and politically problematic roles, such as 'deep cover' activities, agent running, assassinations, sabotage, intelligence, espionage and as agents provocateur. In particular, Group IV has focused on infiltrating what were deemed to be opposition groups, acting as agents provocateurs in order to legitimise official crackdowns.

Kingsbury notes that members of Group IV can be identified for growing their hair long, dress in nonconformist civilian clothes, set up secret cells based on groups of five, and sometimes carry out assassinations and other acts of terror. Also, they do not salute superior officers when outside their base. This group is also known for recruiting criminals as auxiliaries.

== Aftermath ==
In 1998, many of the victims' families started to organise in order to ask the government for answers about the kidnappings. For this purpose, they created the Indonesian Association of Families of the Disappeared (IKOHI), and held meetings, public campaigns and actions with institutions in Indonesia and abroad. Due to their petitions, the government decided to conduct an investigation through The strong demand from the victims and the public finally had the government through its Commander of TNI (state army) to form the Council of Military Ethical Office (Dewan Kehormatan Perwira) to carry out an investigation.

The case was investigated by the National Commission on Human Rights under Law No. 26/2000 on Human Rights Court and the results were submitted to the Attorney General in 2006. The National Commission on Human Rights team was working on the cases of forced disappearance from October 1, 2005 until October 30, 2006.

Abdul Hakim Garuda Nusantara (Chairman of the National Human Rights Commission in 2006) requested the Attorney General to use the results obtained through the Commission to establish a team of investigators, as they had obtained sufficient preliminary evidence to prove the existence of crimes against humanity. An assistant to the ad hoc investigation team into the 1997–1998 disappearances, Lamria, said there a number of people out of the 13 activists that are still missing who are known to have been at the army's elite special forces Kopassus post located the Cijantung area of East Jakarta. They are Yani Afrie, Sony, Herman Hendrawan, Deddy Hamdun and Noval Alkatiri, who Faisol Riza and Pius Lustrilanang met before released.

The Commission concluded that there was evidence of human rights violations in the forced disappearance of activists during 1997–1998. This conclusion is based on the testimonies of 58 victims and community members, 18 retired members of the Police and a retired military. On December 22, 2006 the Human Rights Commission asked the Indonesian House of Representatives (DPR-RI) to urge the President to deploy and mobilize all law enforcement officials to resolve the issue. The House Speaker Agung Laksono on February 7, 2007, also asked President Yudhoyono to order the Attorney General Abdul Rahman Saleh to conduct investigations and examinations based on the findings of the Commission to resolve the case.

In an interview with the Argentinian newspaper Tiempo, Haris Azhar, director of Kontras, explained that "it was not easy, but we managed to take the case to justice. In the end they investigated it in 2005 and after investigations all the material was delivered to the Attorney General, as established by the Human Rights Court law". In the same interview, Azhar pointed out that he had the chance to talk to the Attorney General, who told him that "this is not a matter of legal technicalities, but political support is needed from the president and I do not have it". According to Azhar, this situation comes from the fact that the president's position is on the same level as the head of the military, the police, the intelligence corps and does not have the courage to control the security forces.

== Controversies ==
=== 2014 ===
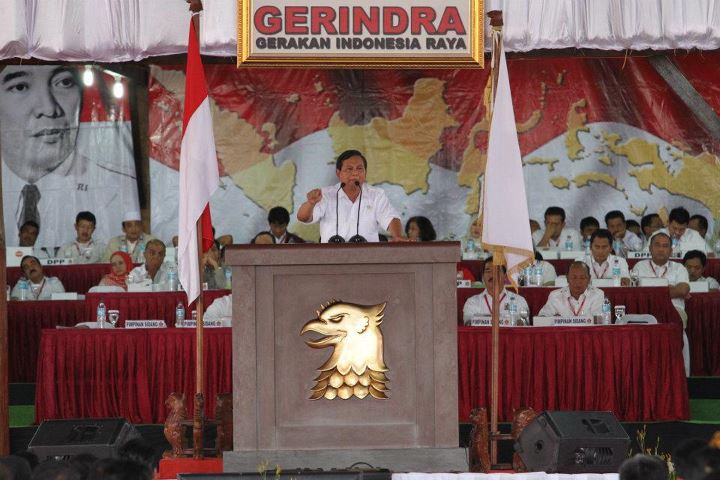
Prabowo during the nomination ceremony for the 2014 presidential election in Lembah Hambalang, on March 17, 2012

After an article published by The Jakarta Post mentioning the possible responsibility of the presidential candidate Prabowo, he answered the newspaper with a letter stating that he had nothing to do with it. However, as explained by Kingsbury, in August 1998 Prabowo, who was then the commander of Kostrad, admitted his responsibility to a military investigation team. He confirmed that he had been responsible for a series of political kidnappings and disappearances, being later removed from his posts with and two other senior Kopassus officers. He was also dismissed from the army.

As reported by The Jakarta Post in June 2014, the Veterans Association chairman Gen. Agum Gumelar stressed that Prabowo told him that "he was ordered by former president Soeharto to kidnap the activists".

As a 2014 presidential candidate, Prabowo's past came under renewed scrutiny, with many organisations calling for him to step down. A coalition, which consisted of Imparsial, Kontras, the Setara Institute, and the Human Rights Working Group (HRWG), combined under the Civil Society Coalition Against Forgetting, visited the National Commission on Human Rights (Komnas HAM) in Jakarta on May 7, 2014 to urge the commission to re-investigate Prabowo. A June 27, 2014 report indicated that an investigative journalist, Allan Nairn, had been threatened with arrest "for revealing the former general's role in human rights abuses."

=== 2020 ===
On 25 September 2020, President Joko Widodo appointed six military officers to strategic posts within the Defense Ministry, including two former members of the infamous Tim Mawar; Yulius Stevanus, and Dadang Hendrayudha.

== See also ==
- May 1998 riots of Indonesia
- Discrimination against Chinese Indonesians
