= Fikry Cassidy =

Indonesian diplomat (born 1965)

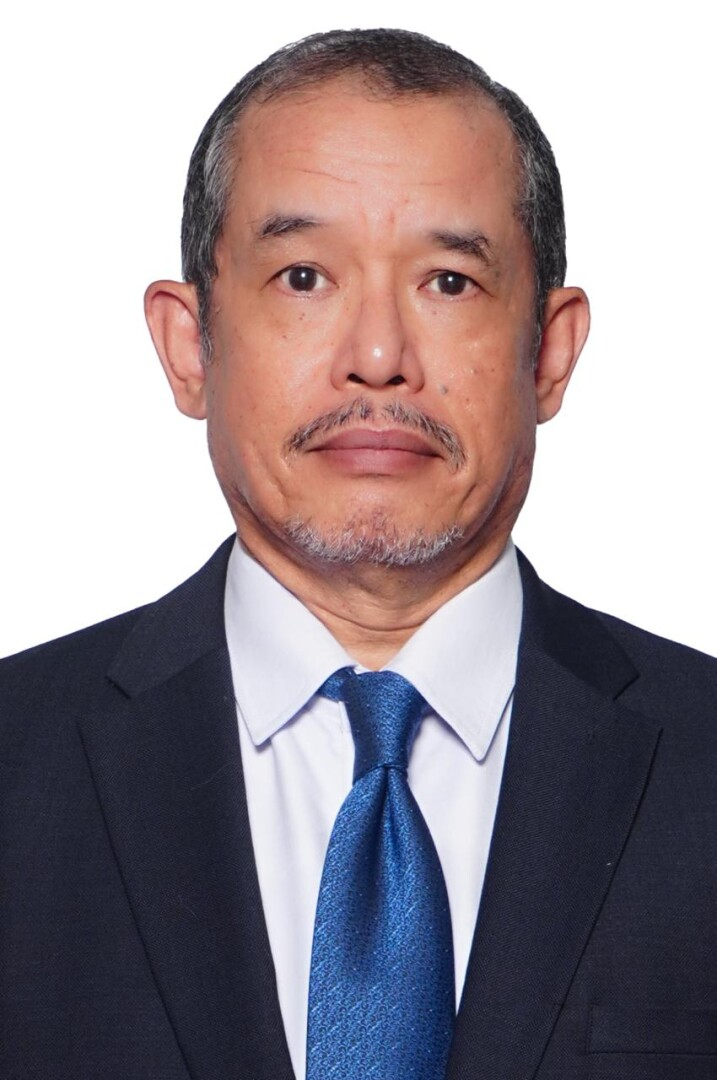

Ambassador of Indonesia to Venezuela, Dominica, Grenada, Saint Lucia, Saint Vincent and the Grenadines, and Trinidad and Tobago
- Incumbent
- Assumed office 24 March 2025
- Preceded by: Imam Edy Mulyono

Personal details
- Born: 25 May 1965 (age 61)
- Spouse: Lusia Veniokta
- Education: Parahyangan Catholic University; University of Western Australia

Fikry Cassidy (born 25 May 1965) is an Indonesian diplomat who is currently serving as the ambassador to Venezuela, with concurrent accreditation to Dominica, Grenada, Saint Lucia, Saint Vincent and the Grenadines, and Trinidad and Tobago.

== Early life and education ==
Fikry was born on 25 May 1965. He started his education at the Parahyangan Catholic University in 1984, majoring in international relations, and graduated in 1989. He later pursued his master's degree in business administration at the University of Western Australia from 2000 to 2002.

== Career ==
Fikry joined the foreign ministry in July 1990. He served in a number of diplomatic postings, including at the political section of the permanent representative to the United Nations in New York. He was responsible on matters relating to the United Nations Security Council, peacekeeping operations, and international tribunals. He was assigned with the rank of first secretary, and was later promoted to counsellor in 2006. Fikry then became the deputy director (head of subdirectorate) of international security at the foreign ministry and attended a training at the Netherlands Institute of International Relations Clingendael. Around this time, he also became the acting director for international security and disarmament.

Upon service in the foreign ministry, Fikry returned to the political affairs section of permanent representative to the United Nations in New York with the rank of minister counsellor. He was later transferred to the foreign ministry's agency for policy assessment and development to head its international organizations center. During his tenure, Fikry signed a number of memorandum of understandings on research with universities in Indonesia, such as the Pelita Harapan University and the Budi Luhur University. The center also produced a book on Indonesia’s strategic framework for protecting and addressing cases involving seafarers.

Fikry became the deputy ambassador of Indonesia to the Netherlands on 23 April 2018. Shortly after his arrival, in June Fikry and other embassy officials visited the former Indonesian consulate compound in Amsterdam-Zuid which was squatted. Squatters hung an Indonesian flag with a squatter logo on the building, which deeply offended the Indonesians present. Although the police determined the building was vacant and chose not to evict the squatters that evening, Fikry disputed this, insisting the building was not empty and urging police to act. Between the departure of ambassador I Gusti Agung Wesaka Puja to the arrival of the new ambassador Mayerfas from 26 June to 2 November, Fikry became the chargé d'affaires ad interim of the embassy. In April 2021, Fikry was nominated as the Deputy for Foreign Policy Coordination in the Coordinating Ministry of Politics and Security, but lost to the more senior Rina Soemarno.

On 23 November 2021, Fikry became the chief of the ministry of transportation's international partnership and institutional facilitation center. He also became the president commissioner of the state-owned dredging company on 1 August 2024. During his tenure, Fikry was entrusted to represent the government and the ministry of transport in a number of transport-related international summits and meeting, including as chair of the 42nd ASEAN Transport Facilitation Working Group, delegate to the working group's 43rd session, and the 22nd ASEAN-JAPAN Senior Transport Official Meeting.

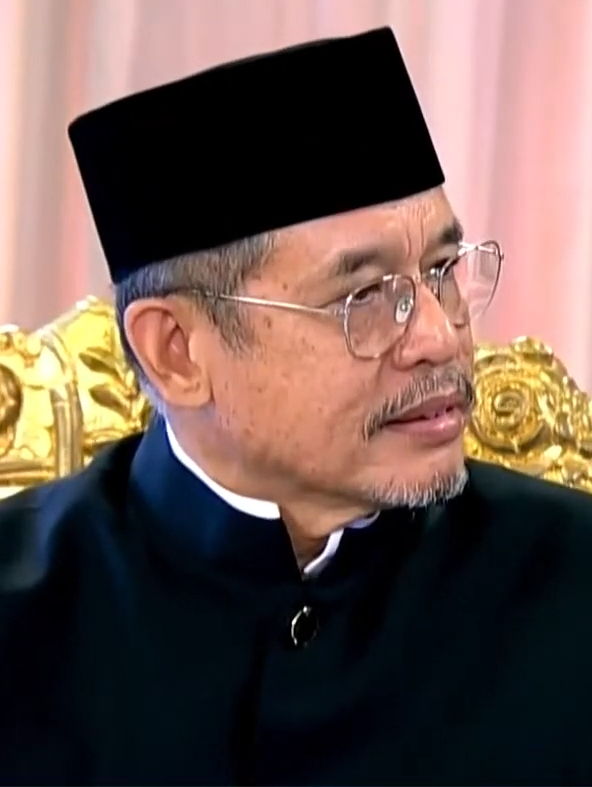
Fikry Cassidy at his credential presentation.

In August 2024, President Joko Widodo nominated Fikry as Indonesia's ambassador to Venezuela, with concurrent accreditation to Dominica, Grenada, Saint Lucia, Saint Vincent and the Grenadines, and Trinidad and Tobago. He passed a fit and proper test held by the House of Representative's first commission in September that year and was installed by President Prabowo Subianto on 24 March 2025. Fikry arrived at the Simón Bolívar International Airport on 7 July and was received by the deputy minister for Asia, Middle East, and Oceania Tatiana Pugh Moreno, and he assumed duties from the embassy's chargé d'affaires ad interim on the same day. He presented his credentials to the President of Venezuela Nicolás Maduro on 30 July 2025, Governor-General of Saint Vincent and the Grenadines Susan Dougan on 5 November 2025, President of Dominica Sylvanie Burton on 10 November 2025, Governor-General of Grenada Cécile La Grenade on 21 April 2026, and President of Trinidad and Tobago Christine Kangaloo on 28 May 2026.

== Personal life ==
Fikry is married to Lusia Veniokta.
