= Christoph Schuck =

German political scientist and professor

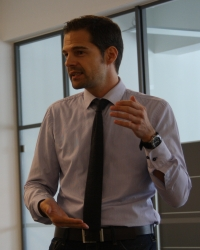
Christoph Schuck giving a lecture in 2015

Christoph Schuck (born 1976 in Giessen) is a German political scientist. He is a professor at TU Dortmund University.

== Education and career ==
Schuck studied social sciences (with a focus on developing countries) and geography at the University of Giessen and at the University of Tampere from 1996 to 2001. In 2003, he received his doctorate from the University of Giessen with a dissertation on the democratisation process in Indonesia. He subsequently worked at the university as a research fellow of the German Research Foundation and headed several Southeast Asian projects funded by the Federal Foreign Office. In 2008, he completed his habilitation with a thesis on transnational Islamism.

From 2008 to 2009, Schuck held an interim professorship at the University of Jena. In October 2009, he was appointed to a junior professorship at TU Dortmund University, where he was later appointed to a full professorship in 2013. He has undertaken several research visits, including to Yale University, Parahyangan University, the University of Malaya, and the University of Lucerne.

At TU Dortmund, Schuck served from 2014 to 2016 as vice-dean for Research and Finance, and from 2016 to 2024 as dean of the Faculty of Human Sciences and Theology. During his tenure as dean, the university awarded an honorary doctorate in political science to Donald Tusk, then President of the European Council, on 16 December 2018.

Schuck's research lies at the intersection of political theory and international relations. His publications address security concepts, military interventions, and the political theory of Islamism. More recently, his research on Lost Ski Area Projects has attracted considerable media attention. Outside his principal research areas, this work examines structural changes in the Alps, the future of alpine skiing, and the decline of ski resorts.

== Awards ==
- Membership of the Global Young Faculty of the Mercator Foundation (2013)
