= Fatia Maulidiyanti =

Indonesian human rights activist (born 1992)

- Maulidiyanti in 2025
- Born: 13 September 1992 (age 34); Bogor, West Java, Indonesia
- Education: Parahyangan Catholic University
- Occupation: Human rights activist
- Years active: 2015–present
- Employer: Commission for Missing Persons and Victims of Violence

Fatia Maulidiyanti (born 13 September 1992) is an Indonesian human rights activist. She was the coordinator of the Commission for Missing Persons and Victims of Violence between 2020 and 2023.

== Early life and education ==
Maulidiyanti was born in Bogor, West Java, Indonesia. She graduated from Parahyangan Catholic University in 2015 with a degree in international relations. While a student, Maulidiyanti was a 2014 alumna of the Sekolah Hak Asasi Manusia (lit. 'School of Human Rights'), a human rights training and education programme for young activists organised by the Commission for Missing Persons and Victims of Violence (Indonesian: Komisi untuk Orang Hilang dan Korban Tindak Kekerasan, KontraS).

== Activism ==
=== KontraS (2015–2023) ===
Maulidiyanti began her career at KontraS, first as a staff member and later as the head of its international advocacy division. On 29 June 2020, she succeeded Yati Andriyani as KontraS' coordinator. During Maulidiyanti's time at KontraS, she frequently worked on cases dealing with women's rights, land conflicts, and labour rights violations.

Maulidiyanti was one of the investigators into the presence of the Indonesian National Armed Forces in Intan Jaya Regency, Central Papua. On 16 August 2021, she was among the co-authors of a report, "Ekonomi-Politik Penempatan Militer di Papua" (lit. 'The Political Economy of Military Placement in Papua'), jointly published by KontraS, Yayasan Lembaga Bantuan Hukum Indonesia, LBH Papua, the Indonesian Forum for Environment, Walhi Papua, Pusaka Bentala Rakyat, Jaringan Advokasi Tambang, Greenpeace, and Trend Asia. The report found evidence of human rights abuses by the Indonesian army against civilians throughout various regions in Papua, linked to its handling of the Free Papua Movement, as well as military interests in mining companies such as Freeport Indonesia, Antam, and Toba Sejahtera.

=== Subsequent activism (2023–present) ===
On 18 July 2023, Maulidiyanti was succeeded as coordinator of KontraS by Dimas Bagus Arya Saputra. Maulidiyanti went on to serve as vice president of the International Federation for Human Rights, remaining in post until October 2025. Since February 2025, she has worked as the Indonesia Focal Point for the Centre for Civil and Political Rights, in which she advocates for Indonesia to fulfil its obligations under the International Covenant on Civil and Political Rights.

== Criminal charges, trial and acquittal ==
On 20 August 2021, Maulidiyanti appeared on an episode of Haris Azhar's podcast in which she discussed the relationship between militarism in Papua and the mining industry, including the military backgrounds of local politicians and business leaders.

On 22 September 2022, Luhut Binsar Pandjaitan, a retired general and the then-Coordinating Minister of Maritime and Investment Affairs, reported Maulidiyanti and Azhar to the Greater Jakarta Metropolitan Regional Police under the Electronic Information and Transactions Law, alleging that they had disseminated information online that contained defamation and slander. Evidence cited against Maulidiyanti included her stating that Pandjaitan was "playing around in the mining sector" (Indonesian: bermain di dalam pertambangan-pertambangan) and she and Haris commenting on his affiliation with mining businesses in Intan Jaya. The charges against Maulidiyanti and Azhar were criticised as being "another blow to freedom of expression" in Indonesia by human rights groups.

On 8 January 2024, the East Jakarta District Court acquitted Maulidiyanti and Azhar of all charges. It ruled that their statements could not be considered fake news due to Pandjaitan being the beneficial owner of Toba Sejahtera.
