= Hungarian Civil Liberties Union =

- Founded: 1994
- Founder: Gábor Attila Tóth
- Type: Human rights group
- Location: Budapest, Hungary
- Key people: Stefánia Kapronczay, Executive Director; Máté Dániel Szabó, Director of Programs; Gábor Attila Tóth, Founder, Past President; Balázs Dénes, Past President; Judit Fridli, Past President
- Website: https://hclu.hu (English https://tasz.hu (Hungarian) https://twitter.com/hclu

The Hungarian Civil Liberties Union (HCLU, Hungarian: Társaság a Szabadságjogokért, abbreviated TASZ) is a human rights NGO. Since its foundation in 1994, it has been working for everybody being informed about their fundamental human rights and empowered to enforce it against the undue interference by those in position of public power. HCLU monitors legislation, pursues strategic litigation, provides free legal aid assistance in more than 2500 cases per year, provides trainings and launches awareness raising media campaigns in order to mobilize the public. It stands by citizens unable to defend themselves, assisting them in protecting their basic rights. It is present at courts, national and international conferences, universities, in the capital and at the countryside.

== Projects ==
The ‘Equality Project’ of HCLU works against state-level discrimination of the most vulnerable groups within society, as well as to create equal opportunities for these groups. There are two groups that are the main focuses of this project: the Roma people living in extreme poverty who are typically subjected to segregated conditions; and people living with disabilities, who are often isolated in their living conditions, and are being denied the right to make decisions regarding their own lives even when they are adults. HCLU also adheres to the equal rights of other vulnerable groups, especially homeless people, refugees, members of the LGBTQI community. Nevertheless, primarily its partner organisations handle the protection of the rights of these latter groups of society.

The main objectives of the ‘Privacy Project’ are to ensure that state intervention into the private life of citizens is only to the extent that is absolutely necessary; and to ensure that the state offers relevant services that are required for citizens to exercise their fundamental human rights (such as health care, public education or social services) at an adequate level. It pays particular attention to the effectiveness of the right to free choice related to decisions on healthcare (e.g. abortion); to the rights of patients, including the right to access to safe and efficient medical care; to the implementation of freedom of belief, in particular to education; to state-level drug policy; and to the protection of personal data.

The ‘Political Freedoms Project’ works to ensure that citizens can form their opinion on public affairs, have a say about the shaping of these without unconstitutional restrictions, and express their opinion about the operation of the state. It gives particular consideration to the freedom of expression and the freedom of press; the right of assembly; the transparent functioning of the state and the freedom of information facilitating it; as well as the exercise of participatory rights, in particular the exercise of electoral rights.

== Funding ==
It does not accept any funding by the Hungarian state nor any donation from political parties. Its revenues are from private individuals, companies and private foundations.

== Members ==
HCLU is led by Executive Director Stefánia Kapronczay and Director of Programs Máté Dániel Szabó. They share the responsibility of strategy-making and overseeing the legal and policy work of the HCLU's programs. HCLU's daily operations are run by a staff of about 40: heads of project, project officers, communications personnel, a video advocacy team, attorneys, administrative staff, fundraising staff. The organization also has a strong and active volunteer base with close to 100 members. The directors are appointed by a five-member Board. Members of the Board are elected by the General Assembly of the HCLU association. The association also has a three-member Surpervisory Board which oversees the legality of HCLU operations.

== Partners and memberships ==
HCLU's many partners include domestic and foreign individuals and institutions, as well as international organizations.

HCLU is member to two international groups of civil liberties organizations, the International Network of Civil Liberties Organizations (INCLO) and the Civil Liberties Union of Europe (Liberties). Beside these, HCLU is partnering with many organizations, including local groups of activists and a national foundation of community organizers.
