= Freddy Budiman =

Indonesian drug trader (1977–2016)

- Born: 18 July 1977; Surabaya, Indonesia
- Died: 29 July 2016 (aged 39); Nusa Kambangan, Cilacap, Central Java, Indonesia
- Criminal status: Executed by firing squad
- Criminal penalty: Death

Freddy Budiman (18 July 1977 – 29 July 2016) was an Indonesian drug trader who was executed in 2016. His execution along with three other drug traders, are the latest instances of capital punishment in the country as of 2026.

== Early life ==
Budiman grew up in Surabaya. He later settled in Jakarta. At one point he was in the eyewear business.

== Criminal career ==
Budiman was arrested in 2009 for possessing 500 grams of methamphetamine, and was sentenced to 3 years and 4 months in prison for this case. In 2011, he was arrested for importing 1.4 million ecstasy pills from Mainland China. He was sentenced to death in 2012. He was sent to Cipinang prison that year.

Budiman was able to use his wealth and influence in prison. He allegedly paid for preferential treatment and was allowed a room for conjugal visits, based on his lover's confession before he was executed. He also developed a network of drug dealers and concocted his own drugs in prison.

In 2013, he was transferred to Batu prison on Nusa Kambangan. In 2014, Budiman confessed to Haris Azhar that he asked the police, BNN, and the Directorate General of Customs and Excise to import drugs into Indonesia.

== Execution ==
Budiman was executed on 29 July 2016 at Nusa Kambangan, Cilacap, Central Java, together with three other people. The execution was carried out by firing squad. His application for judicial review was rejected by the Supreme Court of Indonesia.

According to his last wish, Budiman was buried in his hometown of Surabaya, at the Mbah Ratu Public Cemetery (TPU), Jalan Demak, near his home in Krembangan, Surabaya.
