= International Network of Civil Liberties Organizations =

- Abbreviation: INCLO
- Website: https://www.inclo.net/

The International Network of Civil Liberties Organizations (INCLO) is a network of 15 independent, national human rights organizations from various nations that work together to promote fundamental rights and freedoms. INCLO supports and mutually reinforces the work of member organizations in their respective countries and collaborates on a bilateral and multilateral basis. INCLO works on four issues: protest rights and policing; surveillance and human rights; religious freedom and equal treatment; and protecting civic space.

== Members ==
- Agora International Human Rights Group (Russia)
- American Civil Liberties Union (United States)
- Association for Civil Rights Israel (Israel)
- Canadian Civil Liberties Association (Canada)
- Centro de Estudios Legales y Sociales (Argentina)
- Dejusticia (Colombia)
- Egyptian Initiative for Personal Rights (Egypt)
- Human Rights Law Centre (Australia)
- Human Rights Law Network (India)
- Hungarian Civil Liberties Union (Hungary)
- Irish Council for Civil Liberties (Ireland)
- Kenya Human Rights Commission (Kenya)
- KontraS (Indonesia)
- Legal Resources Centre (South Africa)
- Liberty (United Kingdom)
