= Haris Azhar =

Indonesian human rights activist

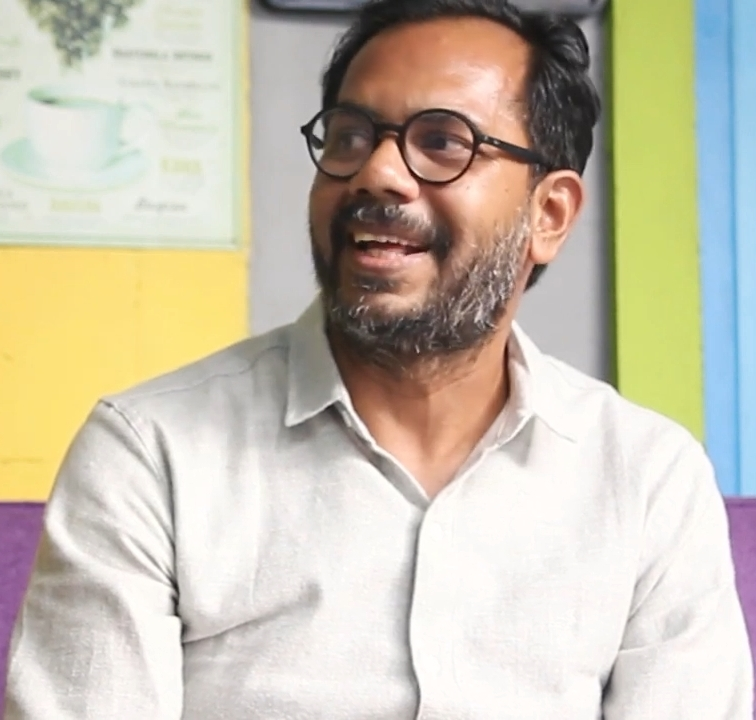
- Born: July 10, 1975 (age 51); Jakarta, Indonesia
- Education: Trisakti University; University of Essex
- Occupation: Human rights activist

Haris Azhar (born July 10, 1975) is an Indonesian human rights activist. He served as the coordinator of the Commission for the Disappeared and Victims of Violence (KontraS) during 2010-2016. He is also a founder of the Jakarta-based NGO Lokataru.

== Early life ==
Haris Azhar was born in Jakarta on July 10, 1975. He is the youngest of four siblings in a family with a diverse ethnic background, including Indian, Banjarese, and Makassarese. His father, Shabir Achmad, was a trader, while his mother, Zubaedah, was a housewife.

== Education ==
During his undergraduate years at Trisakti University, Haris was active in student organizations and campus activism. Especially in the final years of the Suharto regime in 1997-1998, Haris joined the student demonstrations to demand the resignation of President Suharto. Haris graduated from Trisakti University in 1999. Later, he received the Master of Art from the University of Essex in 2010.

== Activism ==
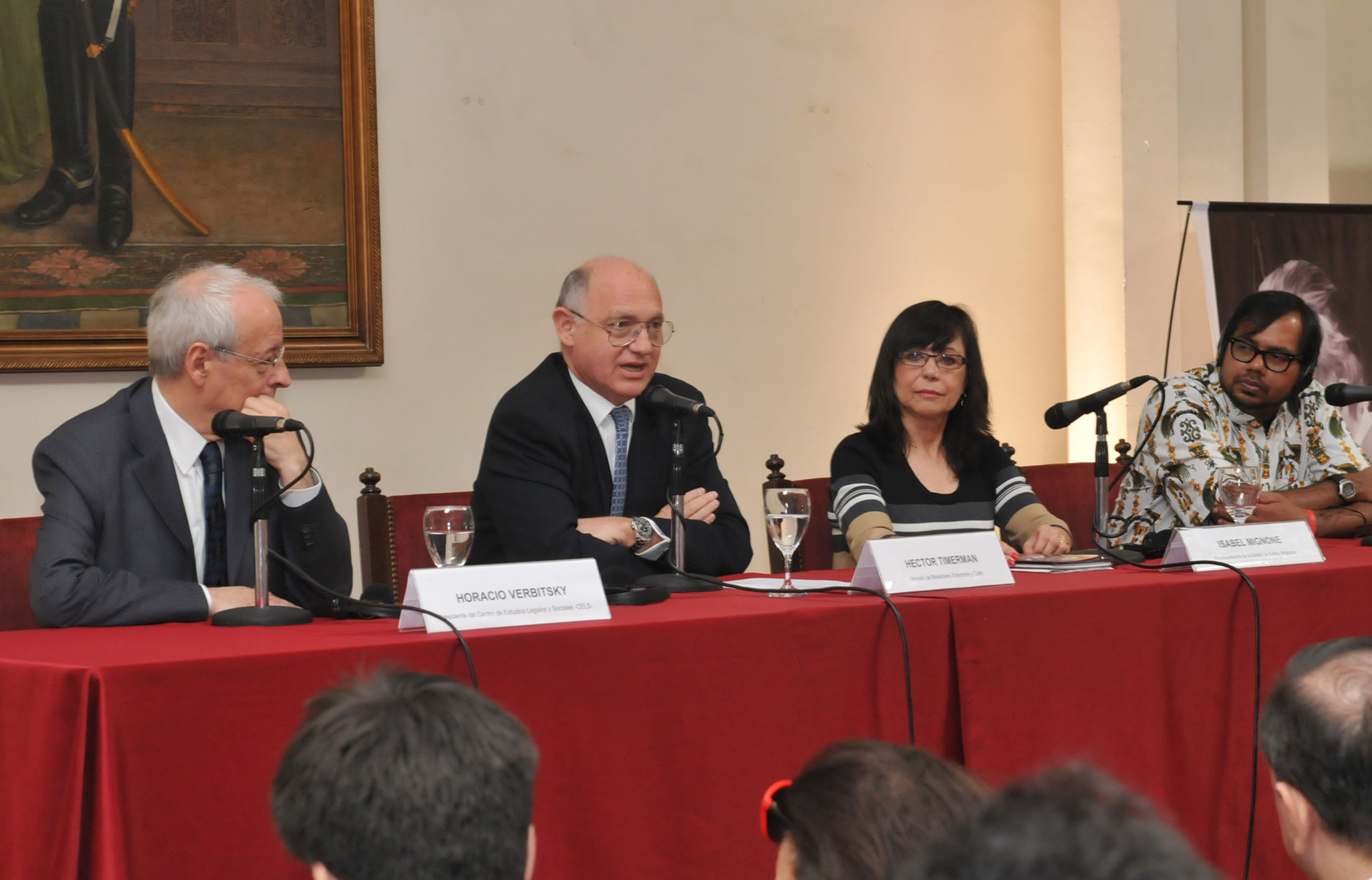
Argentinian Minister of Foreign Affairs, Héctor Timerman, together with the KontraS director Haris Azhar

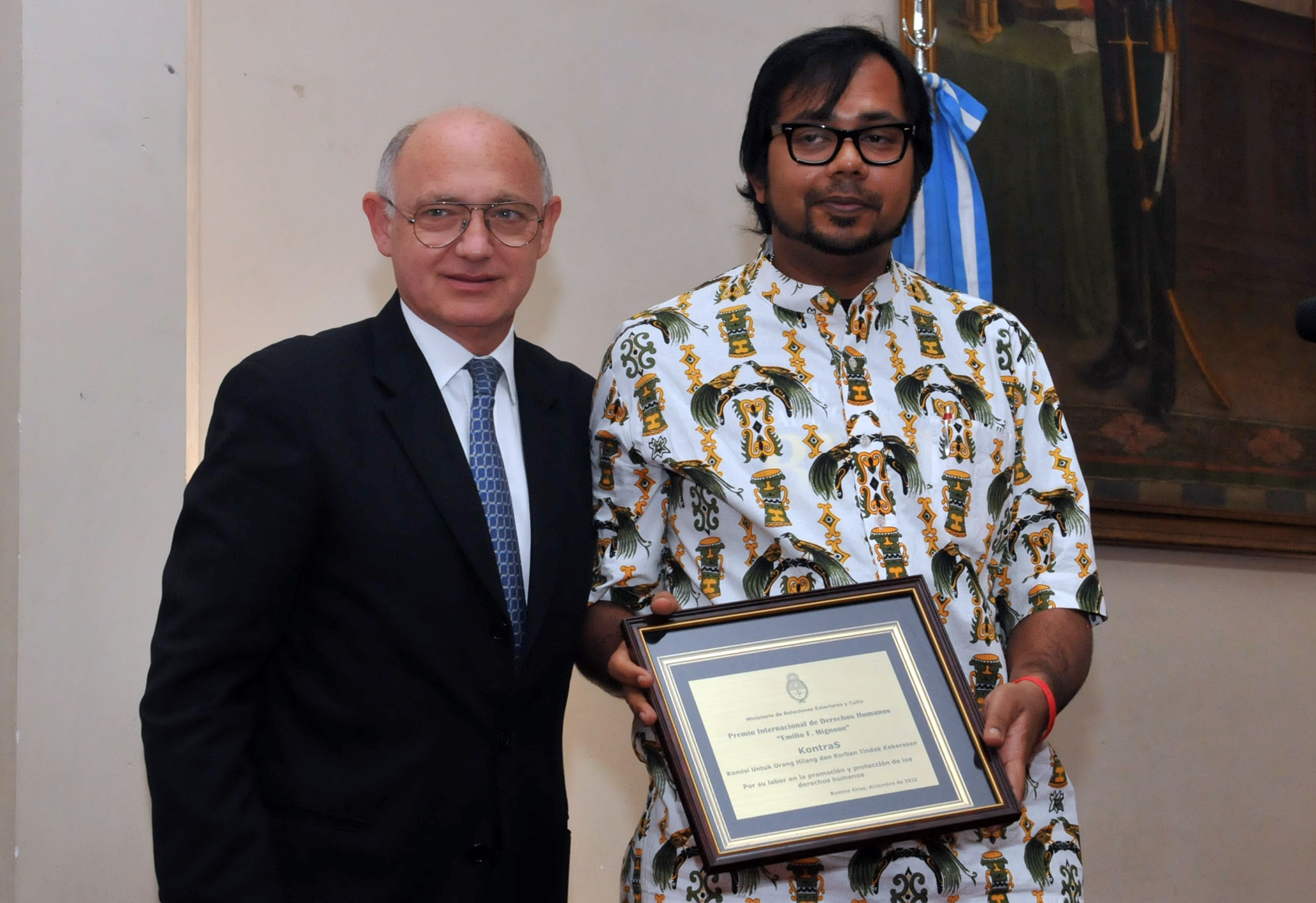
Argentinian Minister of Foreign Affairs, Héctor Timerman, awarding the Emilio F. Mignone International Human Rights Award to KontraS headed by Haris Azhar. Buenos Aires, December 17, 2012.

Haris is known for his activism through a Jakarta-based NGO, Commission for the Disappeared and Victims of Violence (KontraS) since 1999. Initially, he played a role in the division of advocacy, and then became a member of the Bureau of Supervision and Research, and later served as the head of the Bureau of Research, Investigation, and Database. Since 2010 he was promoted to the coordinator of the organization. He served the position until 2016. Notably, during his KontraS years, Haris made a public statement on the alleged involvement of the Indonesian Armed Forces and Indonesian National Police in drug trafficking business by the convicted drug trader Freddy Budiman. As a result of this statement, Azhar was reported to police for alleged defamation on August 2, 2016.

After finishing his term at KontraS, he founded a new NGO called Lokataru, also an NGO for human rights advocacy. He co-founded Lokataru together with Eryanto Nugroho, Sri Suparyati, Nurkholis Hidayat, Atnike Sigiro, Iwan Nurdin, and Mufti Makarim. Since then, he has been serving as the executive director of the organization. Lokataru is active in making public statements towards incidents related to human rights and also providing legal assistance to the victim of human rights violations. Lokataru provided legal assistance to some high-profile clients, for example, Rocky Gerung.

In September 2021, Haris and his fellow KontraS activist Fatia Maulidiyanti were reported by Luhut Binsar Pandjaitan, the Coordinating Minister for Maritime and Investments Affairs, to the police for alleged defamation. Luhut filed a police report to the Jakarta Metropolitan Police after Haris and Fatia made comments in Haris' YouTube video regarding Luhut's affiliation with the mining businesses in Intan Jaya Regency, Papua Province. Luhut's legal action against the activists was slammed by the academics as an assault to the freedom of expression. On January 8, 2024, Haris Azhar and Fatia Maulidiyanti were acquitted of defamation charges against Coordinating Minister for Maritime Affairs and Investment Luhut Binsar Pandjaitan. The verdict was given in a trial at the East Jakarta District Court. Haris Azhar was previously prosecuted by the public prosecutor for 4 years in prison and Fatia for 3 years and 6 months. Haris is the founder of the Lokataru Foundation, while Fatia is the coordinator of the Commission for Missing Persons and Victims of Violence (KontraS).
