= Commission for Missing Persons and Victims of Violence =

Indonesian human rights organization

KontraS
- Commission for Missing Persons and Victims of Violence
- Komisi untuk Orang Hilang dan Korban Tindak Kekerasan
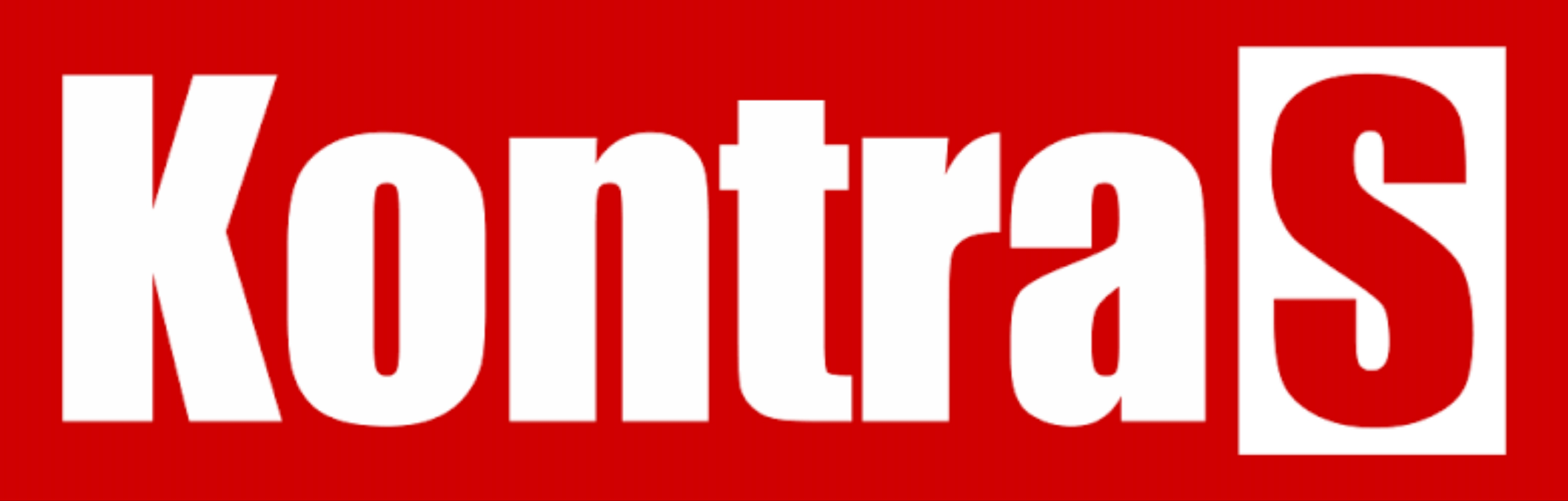
- Predecessor: Independent Human Rights Monitor Commission (KIP-HAM)
- Formation: March 20, 1998; 28 years ago
- Founder: Munir Said Thalib
- Headquarters: Jakarta
- Chairperson: Galuh Wandita
- Affiliations: International Federation for Human Rights, International Network of Civil Liberties Organizations, World Coalition Against the Death Penalty
- Website: kontras.org

The Commission for Missing Persons and Victims of Violence (Indonesian: Komisi untuk Orang Hilang dan Korban Tindak Kekerasan, KontraS) is an Indonesian human rights organization established in 1998 to investigate forced disappearances and acts of violence. It was founded by human rights activist Munir Said Thalib, who in 2004 was poisoned on a flight to Amsterdam.

Fatia Maulidiyanti served as KontraS' coordinator between 2020 and 2023.

In March 2026, Andrie Yunus, KontraS' deputy coordinator, was the victim of an acid attack in Jakarta, suffering severe chemical burns.
