= Zainal Arifin Paliwang =

Indonesian politician

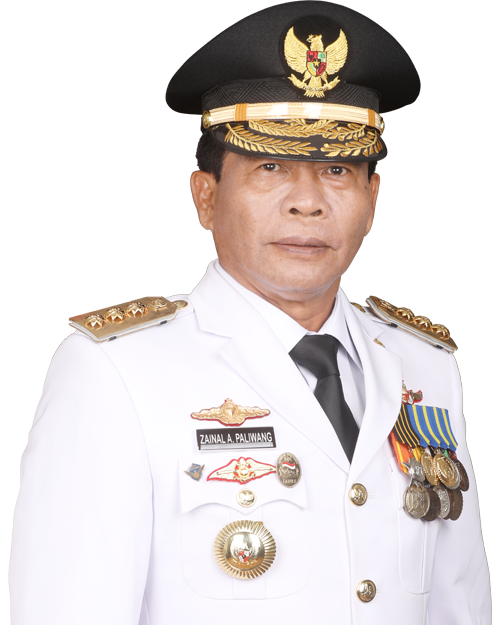

2nd Governor of North Kalimantan
- Incumbent
- Assumed office 15 February 2021
- Deputy: Yansen Tipa Padan (2021-2025); Ingkong Ala (2025-present)
- Preceded by: Irianto Lambrie

Personal details
- Born: 6 December 1962 (age 63) Makassar, South Sulawesi
- Party: Gerindra
- Spouse: Rachmawati Zainal
- Children: 3
- Education: Slamet Rijadi University (LLB); Gadjah Mada University (LLM); Hasanuddin University (LLD)

Zainal Arifin Paliwang (born 6 December 1962) is an Indonesian police officer and politician who has been the second governor of North Kalimantan since 2021. Prior to his tenure as governor he was a police officer that rose to the rank of brigadier general and served as deputy chief of police of North Kalimantan from 2018 to 2020.

== Early life and education ==
Zainal Arifin Paliwang was born in Makassar, Indonesia, on 6 December 1962. He graduated from Angkas 2 Mandal district in 1979, Kasiguncu 1st State Middle School in 1982, and State Senior High School 1 Ujungpandang in 1986. He graduated with a Bachelor of Laws degree from Slamet Rijadi University in 2004, a Master of Law degree from Gadjah Mada University in 2006, and a Doctor of Law degree from Hasanuddin University in 2024.

== Career ==
Paliwang was a brigadier general. He graduated from a police academy in 1986, and worked for the Indonesian National Police as a criminal investigator. From 2018 to 2020, he served as deputy chief of police of North Kalimantan.

Paliwang was elected governor of North Kalimantan after defeating Irianto Lambrie-Irwan Sabri and Udin Hiangio-Undunsyah in the 2020 election and he was reelected in 2024. Paliwang's deputy governor was Yansen Tipa Padan from 2021 to 2025, and then Ingkong Ala since 2025.

In 2021, Paliwang became chair of the advisory board of the North Kalimantan Gerindra Party.

== Personal life ==
Paliwang married Rachmawati Zainal, with whom he had three children. His son died in a car accident in 2022.

== Political positions ==
Paliwang supports the development of gold mining in the Mahak River.

== Works cited ==
- "North Kalimantan governor, deputy governor take oath of office". Antara. 15 February 2021. Archived from the original on 4 July 2025.
- "Plenary DPRD Determination Of Zainal's Elected Governor And Deputy Governor Of Kaltara". VOI.id. 14 January 2025. Archived from the original on 4 July 2025.
- "President Inaugurates The Governor-Deputy Governor Of Kaltara Zainal-Yansen At The Palace". VOI.id. 15 February 2021. Archived from the original on 29 June 2021.
- "Zainal Paliwang Jadi Ketua Dewan Penasihat DPD Gerindra Kaltara, Sejak Awal tak Dideklarasikan". Tribun Kaltim. 7 February 2021. Archived from the original on 4 July 2025.
- Kartono, Jino (19 April 2025). "Cerita Gubernur Kaltara Zainal Paliwang Dulang 2 Gram Emas di Sungai Mahak Malinau". Tribun Kaltim. Archived from the original on 4 July 2025.
- Maryadi, Ari (11 February 2025). "Sosok Jenderal Asal Makassar Dilantik Jadi Gubernur Kaltara 20 Februari 2025". Tribun Timur. Archived from the original on 4 July 2025.
- Maryadi, Ari (19 August 2024). "Sosok Jenderal Bugis Jadi Doktor di Unhas, Alumnus Akpol 1986". Tribun Network. Archived from the original on 4 July 2025.
- Sumardi, Edi (19 February 2025). "Presiden Prabowo Lantik Putra Sinjai Jadi Gubernur, Putri Sinjai Jadi Bupati". Tribun Timur. Archived from the original on 4 July 2025.
- Sumardi, Edi (8 February 2022). "Siapa Dia Sebenarnya? Profil, Biodata AKP Novandi Arya Kharisma Anak Gubernur Kaltara yang Meninggal". Tribun Timur. Archived from the original on 4 July 2025.
