= Parahyangan Catholic University =

Private university in Indonesia

- Universitas Katolik Parahyangan
- Motto: Bakuning Hyang Mrih Guna Santyaya Bhakti
- Motto in English: Based on the belief in God, pursuing knowledge in devotion to the community
- Type: Private
- Established: 17 January 1955; 71 years ago
- Founders: Pierre Marin Arntz, O.S.C. (Bishop of Bandung); Paternus Nicholas Joannes Cornelius Geise, O.F.M (Bishop of Bogor)
- Religious affiliation: Roman Catholic (Crosiers)
Academic affiliations
ACICIS ACUCA APTIK APTISI ASEACCU
GEM
IFCU
INU
READI TEFLIN
- President: Prof. Dr. Ignatius Bambang Sugiharto
- Rector: Prof. Tri Basuki Joewono
- Faculty: 455 (2020): Bachelor: 1%; Postgraduate: 60.8%; Doctoral: 38.2%
- Administrative staff: 402 (2017)
- Students: 2,075 (2025)
- Location: Bandung, West Java, Indonesia; 6°52′30″S 107°36′20″E
- Campus: Urban, 7.6 ha (76,000 m^{2})
- Colours: Khaki and Green
- Sporting affiliations: LIMA
- Mascot: Alligators
- Website: unpar.ac.id

Parahyangan Catholic University, (Indonesian: Universitas Katolik Parahyangan) abbreviated as UNPAR, is one of the oldest and most prestigious private universities in Indonesia, located in Bandung. The main campus is on Ciumbuleuit street, and other campuses are on Merdeka street, Aceh street and Nias street. Before owning a building on Merdeka street, UNPAR used the "Panti Budaya" building (now a new Bank Indonesia Building) for college activities.

Parahyangan Catholic University was founded in 1955 by the leadership of the Catholic Church in Indonesia at that time through cooperation between the Bishop of Bandung, Pierre Marin Arntz, O.S.C. and Bishop of Bogor, Paternus Nicholas Joannes Cornelius Geise, O.F.M. in response to a lack of highly educated experts to build Indonesia after the War of Independence.

UNPAR has the motto Bakuning Hyang Mrih Guna Santyaya Bhakti which means "Based on the belief in God, pursuing knowledge in devotion to the community".

== History ==
Parahyangan Catholic University was established on 17 January 1955, under the name of Commerce Academy, as a collaboration between the Bishop of Bandung, Pierre Marin Arntz, O.S.C. with the Bishop of Bogor Prof. Dr Paternus Nicholas Joannes Cornelius Geise, O.F.M. The status of the academy was upgraded to the Parahyangan Socio-Economic College, which later became the Faculty of Economics. On 15 September 1958, the Faculty of Law was opened and, at the same time, changed the institution's name to Parahyangan Catholic College. The foundation of the organising body of the Parahyangan Catholic College was established on 31 October.

The Faculty of Engineering became the third faculty established after opening in 1960 with a major in civil engineering and architectural engineering. A year later, the Social and Political Faculty was opened. Following Law Number 22 of 1961 concerning Higher Education, the institution's name has changed again and become Parahyangan Catholic University.

On 19 April 1962, with the Decree of the Minister of Higher Education and Science Number 50 of 1962, Parahyangan Catholic University was designated as a university with the same status as a State University.

In 1963, university development took precedence, not on increasing faculties but increasing scientific facilities and infrastructure. Then the Institute of Scientific Investigations was established to support the implementation of the Tri Dharma of Universities in general.

In 1981, with the enactment of new regulations on accreditation and the age of accreditation within the Ministry of Education and Culture, then with the Minister's Decree Number 027/0/1981, Parahyangan Catholic University was reaffirmed as an equalised Private University for three years.

On 1 January 1983, the merger of the Philosophy and Suryagung Bumi Theology School into Parahyangan Catholic University with the name of the Faculty of Philosophy was confirmed by the Kopertis Region IV Decree number 515 / KOP / IV / Q / 82 20 November 1982. That same year on 19 October, the Faculty of Philosophy was approved by the Ministry of Education and Culture of the Republic of Indonesia with a Ministerial Decree Number 0446/0/1983 under the name of the Faculty of Philosophy, majoring in Religion with a registered status to the undergraduate level.

On 20 January 1985, Parahyangan Catholic University has reaffirmed as a Private Higher Education Institution equated for five years, with the Decree of the Minister of Education and Culture Number: 040/0/1985. In line with the contents of the decree, the Faculty of Social and Politics was adjusted to its name as the Faculty of Social and Political Sciences. Likewise, the Institute for Scientific Investigations was changed to a Research Institute to be in line with the term in Government Regulation Number 5 of 1980.

On 19 May 1986, in the context of changing the national education management system, a Decree of the Minister of Education and Culture was issued No. 380/0/1986, which stipulated equalisation status for three years.

On 1 September 1989, equalisation status was set back for three years, with the Decree of the Minister of Education and Culture of the Republic of Indonesia Number 0527/0/1989. 6 September, with the Decree of the Minister of Education and Culture of the Republic of Indonesia Number 0560/0/1989, the status of the Faculty of Philosophy was increased to be recognised for four years.

On 23 November 1990, the NTA-58 Project was inaugurated, a collaborative project between the Government of the Republic of Indonesia and the Kingdom of Belgium, with the implementation of three parties (the University of Indonesia - Katholieke Universiteit Leuven and Parahyangan Catholic University) to hold Postgraduate education in the fields of Administrative Science and Economic Development Studies.

In 1993, the opening of two new faculties began in the 1993–1994 academic year, namely the Faculty of Industrial Technology with two departments (Industrial Engineering and Chemical Engineering) and the Faculty of Mathematics and Natural Sciences with two majors (Mathematics and Physics). The registered status for the two new faculties was obtained through a Decree of the Minister of Education and Culture Number 34 / D / O / 1993 dated 20 April 1993.

On 3 February 1994, with the enactment of a new regulation that the Faculty of Law is no longer familiar with the department, but rather a specialisation program, then with the Decree of the Director-General of Higher Education Ministry of Education and Culture of the Republic of Indonesia Number 62 / DIKTI / Kep / 1994 the status is equalised at the Faculty of Law UNPAR, which is valid for three years.

On 12 May 1995, the Diploma III programme was opened with registered status obtained through a Decree of the Ministry of Education and Culture No. 120 / DIKTI / Kep / 1995. That same year on 23 June, through the Decree of the Ministry of Education and Culture No. 312 / DIKTI / Kep / 1995, opened a Master's program at the Post Graduate Program in the Parahyangan Catholic University.

On 8 August 1996, based on Decree of Director General of Higher Education No. 420 / DIKTI / Kep / 1996, opened the Department of Computer Science Study under the Faculty of Mathematics and Natural Sciences with a registered status.

On 17 November 1997, based on the Decree of the Minister of Education and Culture of the Republic of Indonesia No. 78 / D / O / 1997, concerning the Results of Accreditation of Study Programmes for Bachelor Programmes in Higher Education, the Study Programme of Economics and Development Studies, Accounting, Management, Legal Sciences, Business Administration, International Relations, Public Administration, Architectural Engineering and Civil Engineering got an Accredited status.

== Attributes and Identities ==
=== Emblem ===
The symbol of Parahyangan Catholic University takes the form of a lotus that symbolises the supreme divinity and reads the slogan "Bakuning Hyang Mrih Guna Santyaya Bhakti", which means based on the belief in God, pursuing knowledge in devotion to the community.

The symbol consists of:

- A red-white cross on a black base
- The Bandung Diocese's representation as a university supervisor and the support of the Order of the Holy Cross.
- A circle with 45 green wings, 8 white fingers and 17 white gear
- The representation of the year, month and date of Indonesian independence.
- A circular yellow triangle
- The symbolisation of the concept of the trinity, which is the expression of the central point of Christian faith in God
- The Yellow base Colour Lotus
- The symbolisation of the spirit of divinity
- Five yellow flower leaves
- The symbol of Indonesian state philosophy, Pancasila
- A yellow base colour
- The colour of the symbol of the Catholic Church.

=== Hymn ===
The Hymn of Parahyangan Catholic University was composed by A.P. Sugiharto (lyrics) and Frans Haryadi (music).

=== Mars ===
UNPAR's March lyrics were written by Bambang Sugiharto, while Avip Priatna made the song.

== Academics ==
=== Student Admissions ===
The acceptance of new students at Parahyangan Catholic University is done by a selection mechanism carried out several times throughout the year. The level of difficulty of UNPAR admission is relatively high, whereas, for the 2018 admissions out of 13,716 applicants, UNPAR only admits 2,492 students (18.16% of admissions).

==== Academic and Talent Achievement Program (PMDK) ====
The PMDK is the program provided for prospective students in Diploma and Bachelor level of study with the ability both academically and talent above average who choose UNPAR as the only university choice. Prospective students who take the PMDK Program do not need to take the Entrance Screening Examination (USM).

==== Entrance Screen Examination Program (USM) ====
The Entrance Sieve Examination is a test held at several predetermined locations such as the Ciumbuleuit Campus and High School Partners. USM is carried out three times per year, usually in November, April and June. The type and number of subjects tested on prospective students at USM differ depending on the choice of each study program for prospective students. Prospective students who choose the Architecture Study Program must take a drawing test. Those who choose the Mechatronics Electrical Engineering Study Program must take the Electrical Physics test, and those who choose the Philosophy Study Program must take the interview test.

==== Special Admission via UTBK Score ====
Starting in the year of new Student admission in 2019, UNPAR opens a new admission program, namely the Computer-Based Writing Test (UTBK) score.

=== Learning process ===
UNPAR is a Private College recognized by the government since 1962 (Status equated with State Universities). UNPAR offers one diploma level program, one professional program, sixteen undergraduate programs, ten master's programs and four doctoral programs. Undergraduate programs are taken in 4 years by passing a credit unit of at least 144, completing a Thesis and getting a TOEFL Test score of 500 to get a bachelor's degree, while for a postgraduate program, it varies according to the taken program.

UNPAR runs the semester academic calendar system where there are two terms in a year. Odd term starts in August and ends in December, while even term starts in January and ends in May. Each term has two exams (mid-term exams and final term exams) where the academic Rooster runs with a pattern of 7-2-7-2 (seven weeks of college period and two weeks of exam period). [9]

=== Departments and Program ===
Seven faculties in Parahyangan Catholic University open study programs for undergraduate level and one diploma study program in the Faculty of Economics, while Master's and Doctoral study programs are initially under the Graduate School. [10] [11] [12] [13] [14] In 2018, the Masters and Doctoral Programs in the Graduate School are integrated into the Faculties in UNPAR with the aim that the Masters and Doctoral Programs can be more advanced and developing. [15]

No	Faculties	Majors (National Accreditation)
1	Faculty of Economics	1. Diploma in Corporate Management (B); 2. Economics (A); 3. Accounting (A); 4. Management (A); 5. Master of Management (B); 6. Doctor of Economics (B); 7. Accountant Profession Program (B)
2	Faculty of Law	1. Law (A); 2. Master of Law (B); 3. Doctor of Law (B)
3	Faculty of Political and Social Sciences	1. Public Administration (A); 2. Business Administration with Major in General Business and Digital Business (A); 3. International Relations (A); 4. Master of Social Science (B); 5. Master of International Relations (B); 6. Master of Business Administration
4	Faculty of Engineering	1. Civil Engineering (A); 2. Architecture (A); 3. Master of Civil Engineering (A); 4. Master of Architecture (A); 5. Doctor of Civil Engineering (B); 6. Doctor of Architecture (B)
5	Faculty of Philosophy	1. Philosophy with Major in Divine Philosophy and Cultural Philosophy (A); 2. Master of Theology (B)
6	Faculty of Industrial Technology	1. Industrial Engineering (A); 2. Chemical Engineering (A); 3. Mechatronics Engineering (B); 4. Master of Industrial Engineering (B); 5. Master of Chemical Engineering (B)
7	Faculty of Information Technology and Science	1. Mathematics with Major in Industrial Mathematics and Actuary (A); 2. Physics (A); 3. Informatics Engineering with Major in Computing Science and Data Science (B)

== Achievements ==
In February 2009, a team of 15 students from Parahyangan Catholic University won the "Outstanding Delegation Award" in the Harvard National Model United Nations 2009. This was considered a significant achievement because Parahyangan Catholic University is one of the only three universities in the Asian continent to win an award in HNMUN 2009, with over 3,000 participants from 35 countries.

A world ranking, human competitiveness index and analysis by the Human Resources & Labor Review, published in Chasecareer Network Indonesia, ranked the university eighth in Indonesia in 2010 and 350th-400th worldwide.

In December 2011, a team consisting of two law students from Parahyangan International Law Society (PILS) represented the Asia region to compete in the Third World Human Rights Moot Court Competition at the University of Pretoria, South Africa. The team defeated its Asian rivals — Ateneo de Manila University (Philippines) and National Law Institute, University of Bhopal (India) — and went as far as the semi-finals.

In August 2015, the team from PILS was chosen to represent Indonesia in the 2015 Asia Cup International Law Moot Court Competition in Tokyo, Japan. The team defeated opponents from across Asia, including Japan, the Philippines, Thailand, and Vietnam, and emerged as the third-place winner in the competition. The team also won the Best Memorial Award, becoming the first team from Indonesia to achieve such a feat. Both oralists of the team were ranked in the top 10 oralists.

Almost every year, the representative of International Relations Department students for PNMHII (Pertemuan Nasional Mahasiswa Hubungan Internasional se-Indonesia) achieved the award of Best Delegation for their performance in the Short Diplomatic Course. In the same event, the students obtained awards each year for their presentation in the 'diskusi ilmiah'. PNMHII is an annual meeting and conference of International Relations students all over Indonesia.

=== Choir ===
Parahyangan Catholic University Choir has consistently brought awards and recognitions from international competitions:

- 1st Prize (Mixed Choir) at Nederlands International Koor Festival in 1995, Arnhem
- 1st Prize (Folklore), 3rd Prize (Mixed Choir), 3rd Prize (Female Choir) at XLV Concorso Polifonico Internazionale "Guido d'Arezzo" in 1997, Arezzo
- 2nd Prize (Mixed Choir), 2nd Prize (Musica Sacra), 3rd Prize (Folklore A Capella) at 1st Choir Olympics in 2000, Linz
- 1st Prize (Mixed Choir), 1st Level Achievement at 8th International Chamber Choir Competition Marktoberdorf in 2003
- 2nd Prize (Volksliedbewerb), 3rd Prize (Kuntsliedbewerb) at 45th International Competition of Choral Singing in 2008, Spittal an der Drau
- 1st Prize (Folksong Choirs), 2nd Prize (Mixed Choir) at Llangollen International Musical Eisteddfod in 2010, Eisteddfod, Llangollen
- 3rd Prize (Free Expression) at 40th Florilege Vocal de Tours in 2011, Tours
- 2nd Prize (Historical Period) at LXI Concorso Polifonico Internazionale "Guido d'Arezzo" in 2013, Arezzo
- 1st Prize (Kuntsliedbewerb) at 51st International Competition of Choral Singing in 2014, Spittal an der Drau

== Notable alumni ==
- Fatia Maulidiyanti (2015): human rights activist.

== See also ==
- Education in Indonesia
