= Yansen Tipa Padan =

Indonesian politician (born 1960)

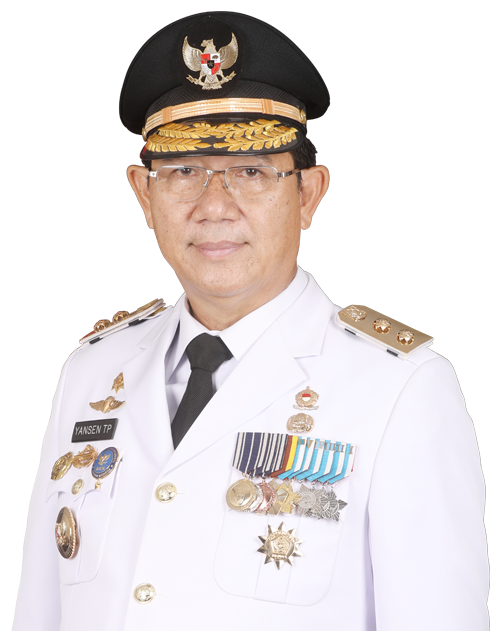

2nd Vice Governor of North Kalimantan
- In office 15 February 2021 – 20 February 2025
- Governor: Zainal Arifin Paliwang
- Preceded by: Udin Hianggio
- Succeeded by: Ingkong Ala

2nd Regent of Malinau
- In office 3 April 2011 – 15 Februari 2021
- Preceded by: Marthin Billa
- Succeeded by: Topan Amrullah

Personal details
- Born: 14 January 1960 (age 66) Indonesia Pa' Upan, South Krayan, Nunukan Regency, North Kalimantan
- Party: Democratic Party
- Spouse: Ping Ding
- Children: Tipa Adiputra; Rosalin Dwiputri; Xena Corpionela; Richard Armandoputra

Yansen Tipa Padan is an Indonesian politician and former vice governor of North Kalimantan. Previously he was regent of Malinau Regency. Born in village of Pa'Upan, Nunukan Regency, he continued his education in Samarinda in politics, gained bachelor and then gained doctor in administration on University of Brawijaya. He is of Dayak ethnic. He was accused by Indonesia Corruption Watch of taking bribes regarding illegal logging in Malinau Regency.
