= Olly Dondokambey =

Indonesian politician

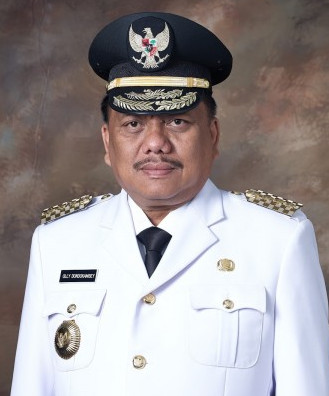

12th Governor of North Sulawesi
- In office 15 February 2021 – 20 January 2025
- Deputy: Steven Kandouw
- Preceded by: Edwin Silangen (Acting)
- Succeeded by: Yulius Selvanus
- In office 12 February 2016 – 12 February 2021
- Deputy: Steven Kandouw
- Preceded by: Soni Sumarsono (Acting)
- Succeeded by: Edwin Silangen (daily caretaker)

Member of the House of Representatives
- In office 1 October 2004 – 29 October 2015
- Succeeded by: Djenri Altin Keintjem
- Constituency: North Sulawesi
- Majority: 52.077 (2004); 114.258 (2009); 237.620 (2014)

Personal details
- Born: 18 November 1961 (age 64) Manado, North Sulawesi, Indonesia
- Citizenship: Indonesian
- Party: Indonesian Democratic Party of Struggle
- Spouse: Rita Tumuntuan (m. 1999)
- Children: 2
- Education: Sekolah Tinggi Ilmu Ekonomi Tri Dharma Widya

Olly Dondokambey (born 18 November 1961) is an Indonesian politician and the former governor of North Sulawesi province. Dondokambey held the office since 12 February 2016 until 20 February 2025. Before being elected governor, he was a representative from North Sulawesi to People's Representative Council of the Republic of Indonesia for two periods serving from 2004 till 2014.

== Electronic ID Scandal ==
In 2018, he was implicated in the government electronic ID scandal centering around Setya Novanto. Novanto gave a list of names of his co-conspirators to the Corruption Eradication Commission, Dondokambey being included.

== Career ==
On the 53rd anniversary of the province's establishment in 2017, he inaugurated a new provincial parliament building.

== Honours ==
- Bintang Jasa Utama - 2023
- Bintang Legiun Veteran Indonesia
- Lencana Melati Pramuka
- Lencana Darma Bakti Pramuka - 2017
- Satyalancana Kebaktian Sosial - 2019
- Satya Lencana Aditya Karya Mahatva Yodha - 2016
