= Tarakan =

Largest city in North Kalimantan, Indonesia

- City
- City of Tarakan; Kota Tarakan
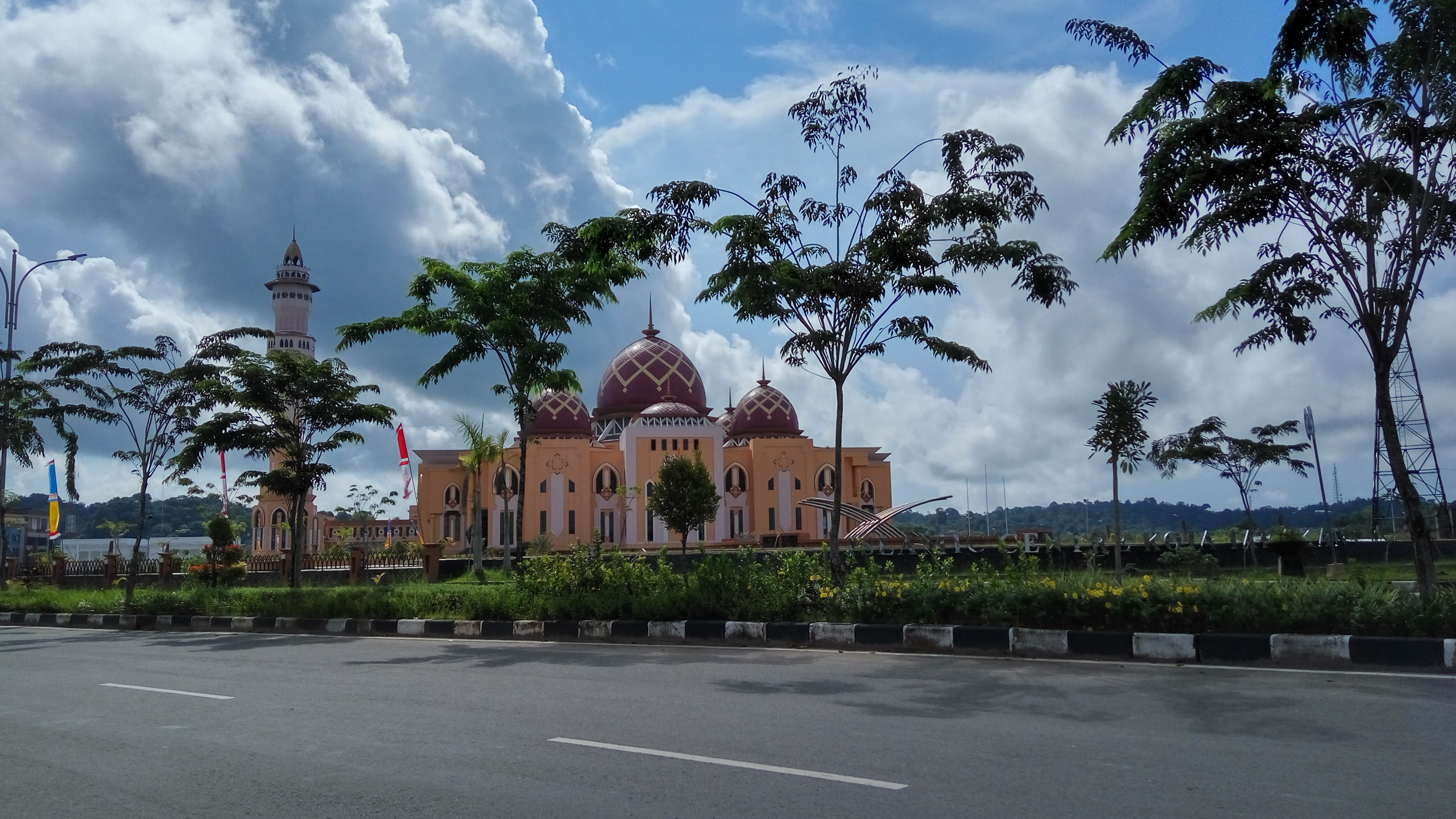
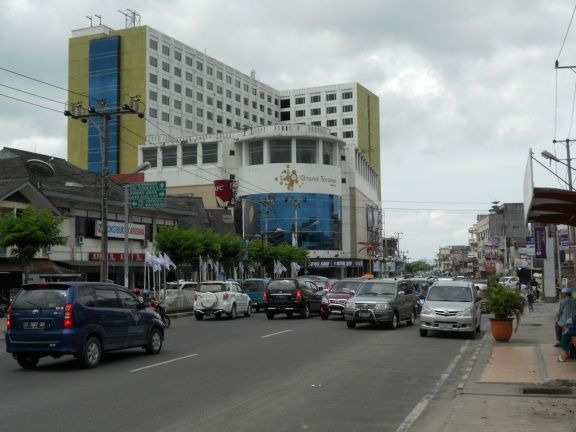
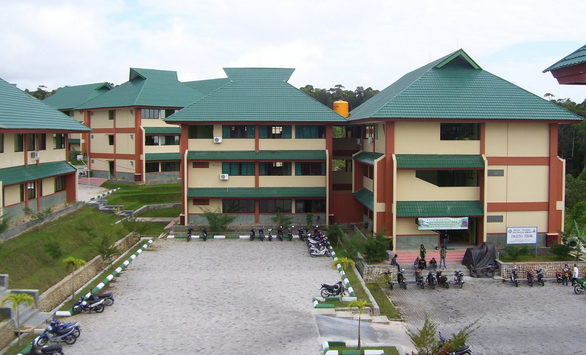
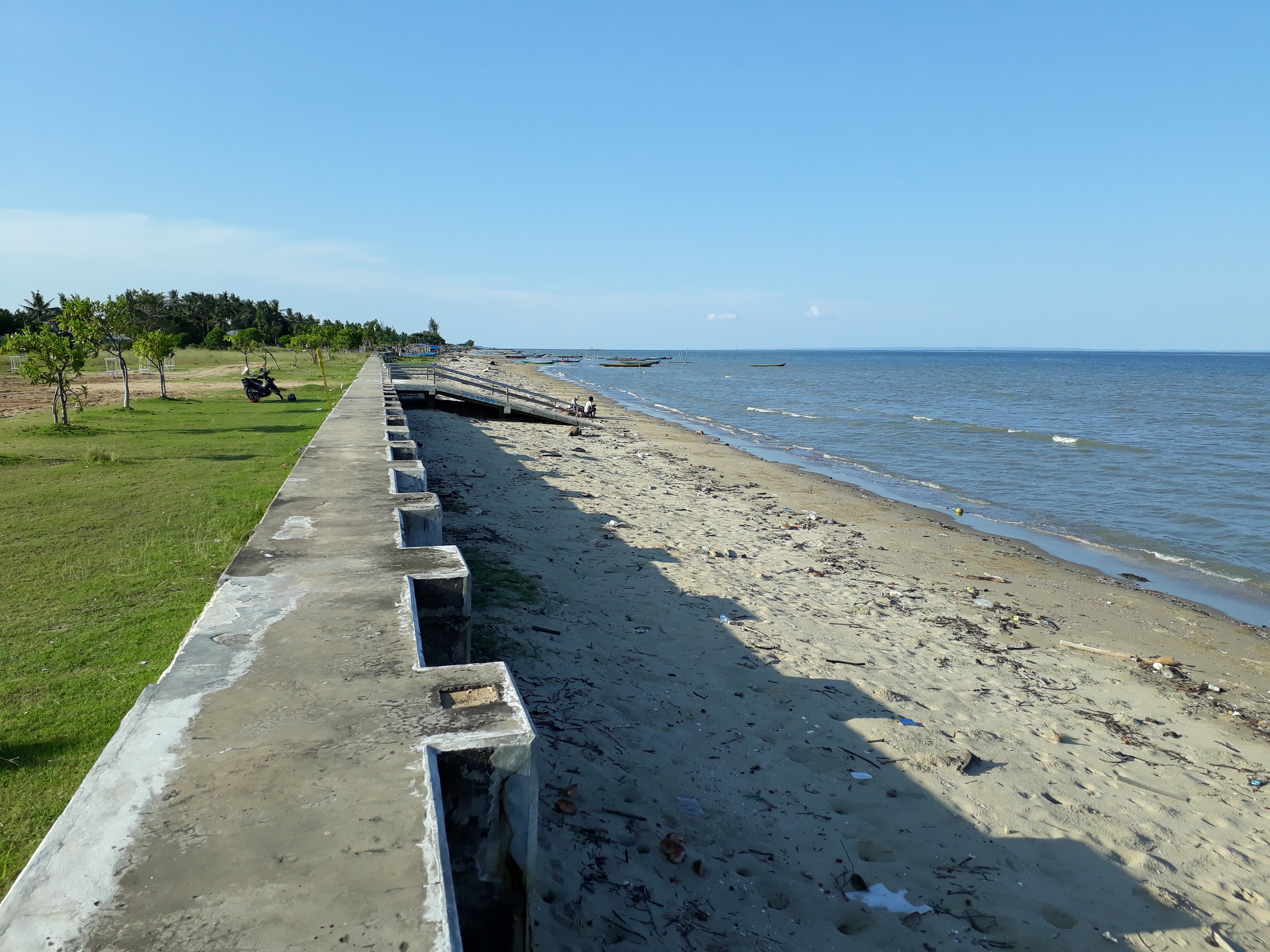
- From top-left, counterclockwise : Islamic Center of Tarakan, Borneo Tarakan University complex, Amal beach, and Street view of Tarakan

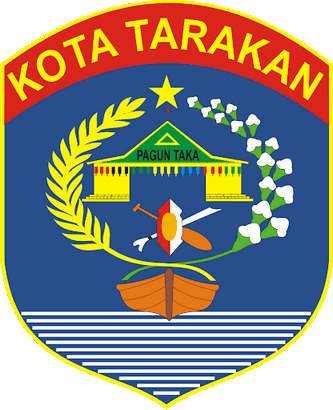
- Coat of arms

- Location within North Kalimantan
- Interactive Map of Tarakan
- Location in Kalimantan and Indonesia Tarakan (Indonesia)
- Coordinates: 3°18′0″N 117°38′0″E
- Country: Indonesia
- Province: North Kalimantan
- Incorporated (city): 15 December 1997

Government
  - Mayor: Khairul (Indp.)
  - Vice Mayor: Ibnu Saud
  - Legislature: Tarakan City Regional House of Representatives

Area
  - Land: 86.35 km^{2} (33.34 sq mi)
  - Water: 406.53 km^{2} (156.96 sq mi)
- Elevation: 0 m (0 ft)

Population (mid 2024 estimate)
  - Total: 255,310
  - Density: 2,957/km^{2} (7,658/sq mi)
- Time zone: UTC+8 (WITA)
- Area code: (+62) 551
- HDI (2019): ▲0.769 (High)
- Website: tarakankota.go.id

Tarakan is an island and co-extensively the sole city within the Indonesian province of North Kalimantan. The island city is the largest urban area in North Kalimantan population-wise and is located in northern Borneo, midway along the coast of the province. The city boundaries are co-extensive with the island (including a couple of small islands off the coast of the West Tarakan District). Once a major oil-producing region during the colonial period, Tarakan had great strategic importance during the Pacific War and was among the first Japanese targets early in the conflict. It is the sole city within the Indonesian province of North Kalimantan (established in 2012). According to theStatistics Indonesia, the city had a population of 193,370 at the 2010 Census and 242,786 inhabitants at the 2020 Census; the official estimate as at mid 2024 was 255,310 (comprising 132,175 males and 123,135 females).

== Geography ==
The city is located on Tarakan island (off the east coast of Kalimantan), which composed of 8,635 hectares (21,340 acres) of land. 27.5% of the city is composed of podzol soil and 57.63% latosol soil. The city is located between 0–110 metres (0–361 ft) above sea level.

== History ==
=== Etymology ===
According to legends, native Tidungs established their kingdom in Tarakan around 1076 CE. After moving their capital several times over the centuries, in 1571 CE they settled their kingdom on the eastern coast of Tarakan, apparently already under the influence of Islam. The name Tarakan comes from the Tidung language: tarak (meeting place) and ngakan (to eat); thus Tarakan was originally a meeting place for sailors and traders to eat, rest and trade their catch in the Tidung area.

=== Petroleum ===
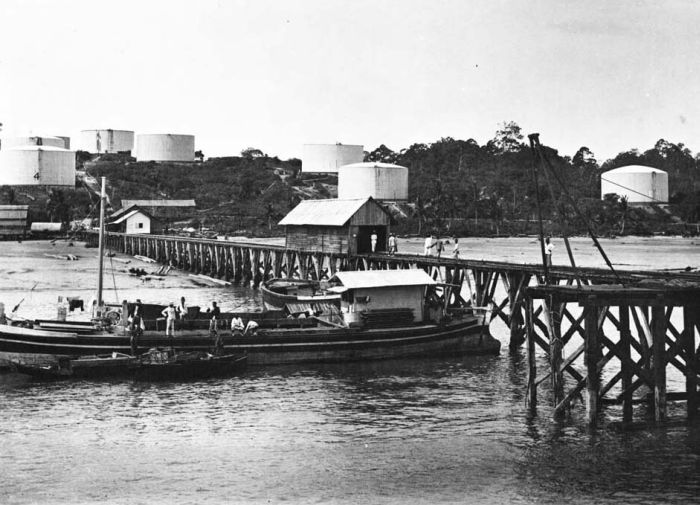
Oil storage tanks and a pier at Tarakan photographed between 1905 and 1914

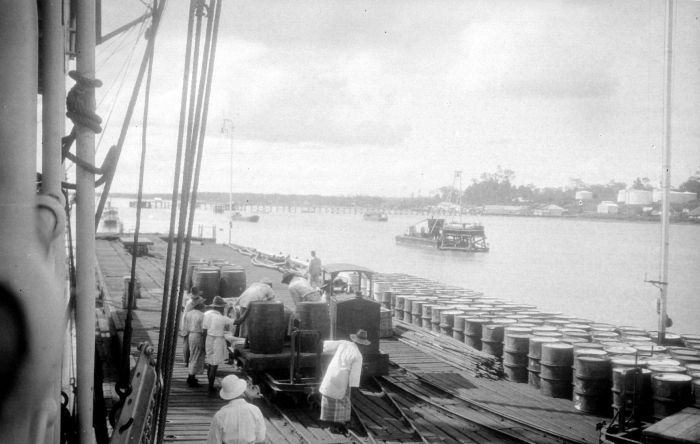
A pier and oil barrels in Tarakan during the Dutch colonial period, ca. 1925

Dutch explorers noted oil seepages in 1863. In 1905, an oil concession was granted to Koninklijke Nederlandsche Petroleum Maatschappij' a predecessor to Royal Dutch Shell. One year later oil production began with a yield of over 57,928 barrels of oil per year. Production continued to increase and in the 1920s Tarakan yielded over five million barrels a year, a third of the total oil production in the whole of the Dutch East Indies.

The oil produced here had a paraffin base instead of the usual asphalt base. Tarakan oil fields produced a light, sour crude oil with an unusually low pour point. By 1940, the island had an oil refinery with four petroleum loading piers, and was one of the five largest petroleum processing centers in the East Indies.

=== World War II ===
Japanese oil-fields in Sakhalin and Formosa provided only about ten percent of the petroleum needed to sustain Japanese industry through the mid-20th century. Reserves of California crude oil at Japanese refineries would have been exhausted in less than two years at the rate of consumption when the United States terminated exports to Japan on 26 July 1941. Japan initiated hostilities against the United States and the United Kingdom four months later in December 1941 in preparation for seizing alternative sources of petroleum in the East Indies. Japan declared war on the Netherlands East Indies on 10 January 1942; and Japanese troops landed on Tarakan the following day. The Netherlands had declared war on Japan a month earlier. Dutch forces sabotaged the Tarakan oil-field and refinery prior to surrender.

Japan had captured the Miri oil-field in Sarawak in December 1941, and captured oil-fields and refineries at Balikpapan in Dutch Borneo in January 1942, Sumatra in February, and Java in March. Oil technicians accompanied the invading Japanese troops to maintain production at captured facilities. A team of one thousand additional petroleum engineers and technicians sailed from Japan aboard the Taiyo Maru, but nearly 800 drowned when USS Grenadier sunk the Taiyo Maru southwest of Kyushu on 8 May 1942. Despite this loss, Tarakan crude oil (mixed with lesser quantities of Manchurian oil-shale distillates) became the primary feedstock for Japanese diesel fuel in 1942, while reserve supplies of California crude oil remained the primary feedstock for Japanese gasoline and residual fuels until 1943.

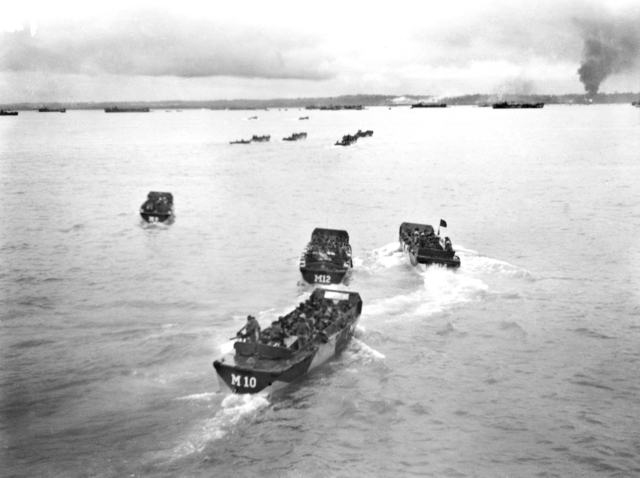
Allied landing vessels during the Battle of Tarakan (1945)

Tarakan became a Japanese strategic air-base from which further attacks could be launched following the Dutch surrender. Tarakan's inhabitants suffered under Japan's occupation. The large number of Japanese troops stationed on the island led to food-shortages and many civilians suffered from malnutrition. During the occupation, the Japanese transported some 600 labourers to Tarakan from Java. The Japanese also forced an estimated 300 Javanese women to work as "comfort women."

Tarakan oil-field production reached 350,000 barrels per month by early 1944, but Japan no longer had enough oil tankers to transport this volume to Japanese refineries. Without adequate supplies of refined residual fuel-oil for the forthcoming Battle of the Philippine Sea, Japanese aircraft-carriers refueled with unrefined Tarakan crude-oil in June 1944. The undesalted crude-oil damaged boiler tubes, and the unremoved naphtha fraction volatilized to form explosive atmospheres, contributing to the loss of the aircraft carriers Taihō, Shōkaku, and Hiyō.

The last Japanese tanker left Tarakan in July 1944; Allied bombing-raids damaged the oil-field facilities later that year; and the veteran Australian 26th Brigade Group ended the Japanese occupation of the area with the second Battle of Tarakan (1 May to 21 June 1945).

=== Independence Era ===
Following the Indonesian revolution in the late 1940s, Tarakan became part of the new republic. It was administered as a district following a Presidential Decree Number 22, 1963. In 1981, Tarakan was granted a city charter, at that time one of four cities in East Kalimantan, along with Samarinda, Balikpapan and Bontang in accordance with Government Law Number 47, 1981.

The city witnessed the Tarakan riot in 2010 following a clash between Buginese migrants from neighboring Sulawesi island and the Tidung people. The two groups later agreed to a peace deal, mediated by local police and the governor of then-East Kalimantan, Awang Faroek Ishak. After North Kalimantan was established as a province in 2012, Tarakan became the sole city within the new province. In 2015, the city witnessed another riot, this time related to the 2015 North Kalimantan gubernatorial election between the candidates' supporters.

== Demographics ==
Tarakan had a population of 193,370 at the 2010 Census, but the 2020 Census this had grown to 242,786, and the official estimate as at mid 2024 was 255,310. Indigenous residents include the Tidung, a subgroup of the Dayak people. The city also has a multi-ethnic population from other parts of Indonesia, such as Bugis, Javanese, and Chinese Indonesians. Apart from that, there are also Tausug whose origins are from the Sulu Islands, as well as Malays, and Mandarese. 85% of the city's population is Muslim, around 10% are Christian, 1.3% Hindu, 0.04% Buddhist, and 0.03% Confucianist.

No.	Ethnic groups	%
1	Bugis	37.45%
2	Malays	35.90%
3	Javanese	11.08%
4	Tidung	10.89%
5	Mandarese	7.44%
6	Dayaks*	7.21%
7	Banjarese	6.06%
8	Chinese	4.50%
9	Tausug	1.77%
10	Toraja	1.48%
11	Others*	12.12%
*Notes: "Dayaks" consists of various sub-ethnic groups; "Others" is a classification of various other ethnic groups that are not recorded (IPUMS and BPS Kota Tarakan, 2010).

Population growth averaged 2.23% per year in the decade 2010–2020. The city population has increased rapidly which is thought to be caused by high urbanization rate with people moving in from neighbouring regions. The sex ratio as of 2020 was 100:109—100 females for every 109 males. The city is dominated by a young and reproductive age population above the age of 15, which accounts around 64.53% of city's population. Life expectancy in the city as of 2020 was 74 years, which is considerably higher than both the provincial and national average; it has been increasing consistently.

== Infrastructure ==
=== Health ===
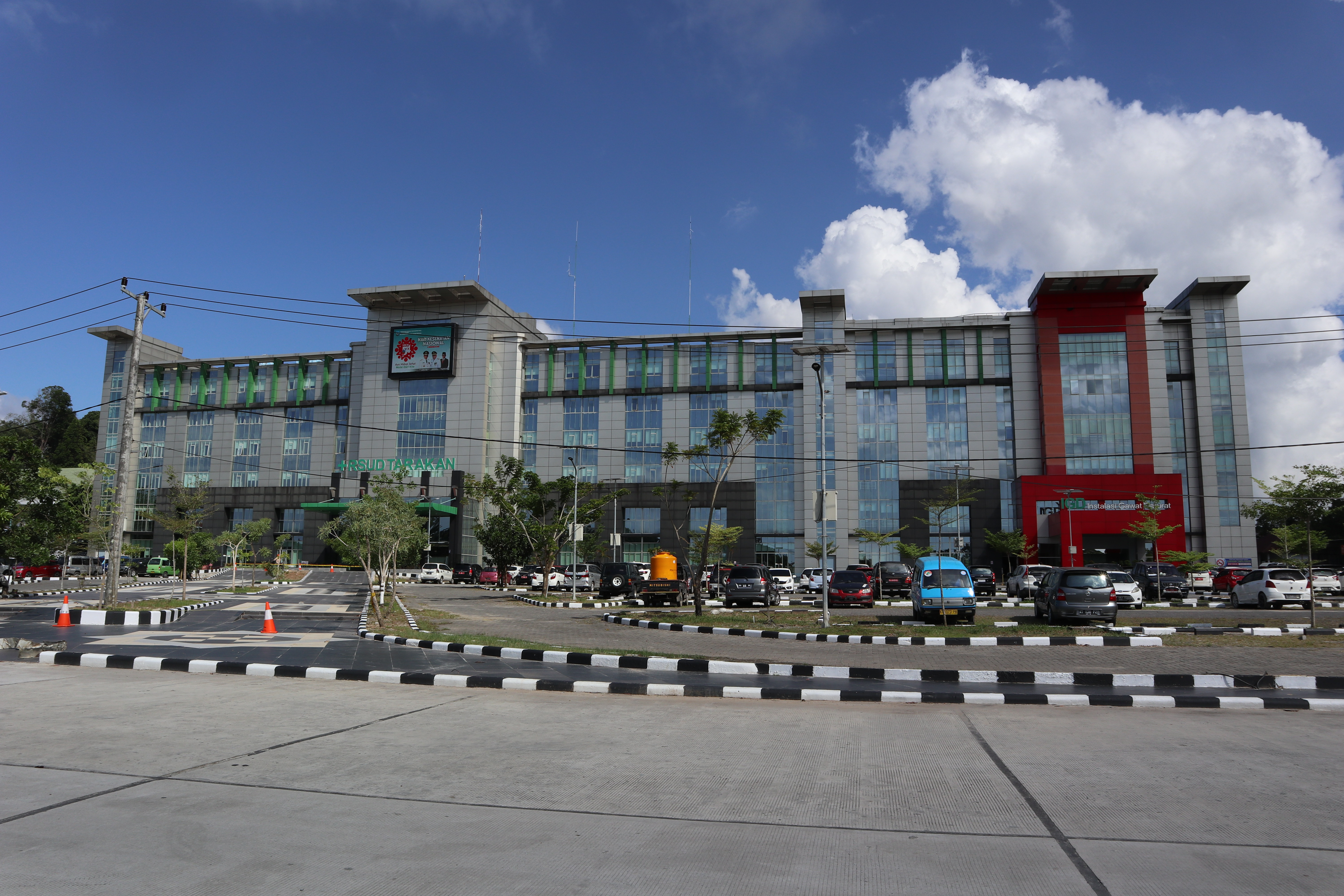
Tarakan Regional Hospital

The island's main healthcare infrastructure consists of four hospitals, eight puskesmas (community health centers), and 103 healthcare centers. In addition, there are seven mobile puskesmas, the biggest being Tarakan Regional Hospital, owned by the city government, located in Central Tarakan district. It is also the only international-class hospital in the province and is the province's referral hospital.

There is also a navy hospital, owned by the Indonesian Navy, located in West Tarakan district.

=== Education ===
There are 27 kindergartens, 65 elementary schools, 21 junior high schools and 12 senior high schools. There are also five institutions of higher education in the city, the most notable being Borneo Tarakan University, which is also the only public university in the city and the province.

There are also seven vocational high schools. School participation rate is around 99% as of 2020.

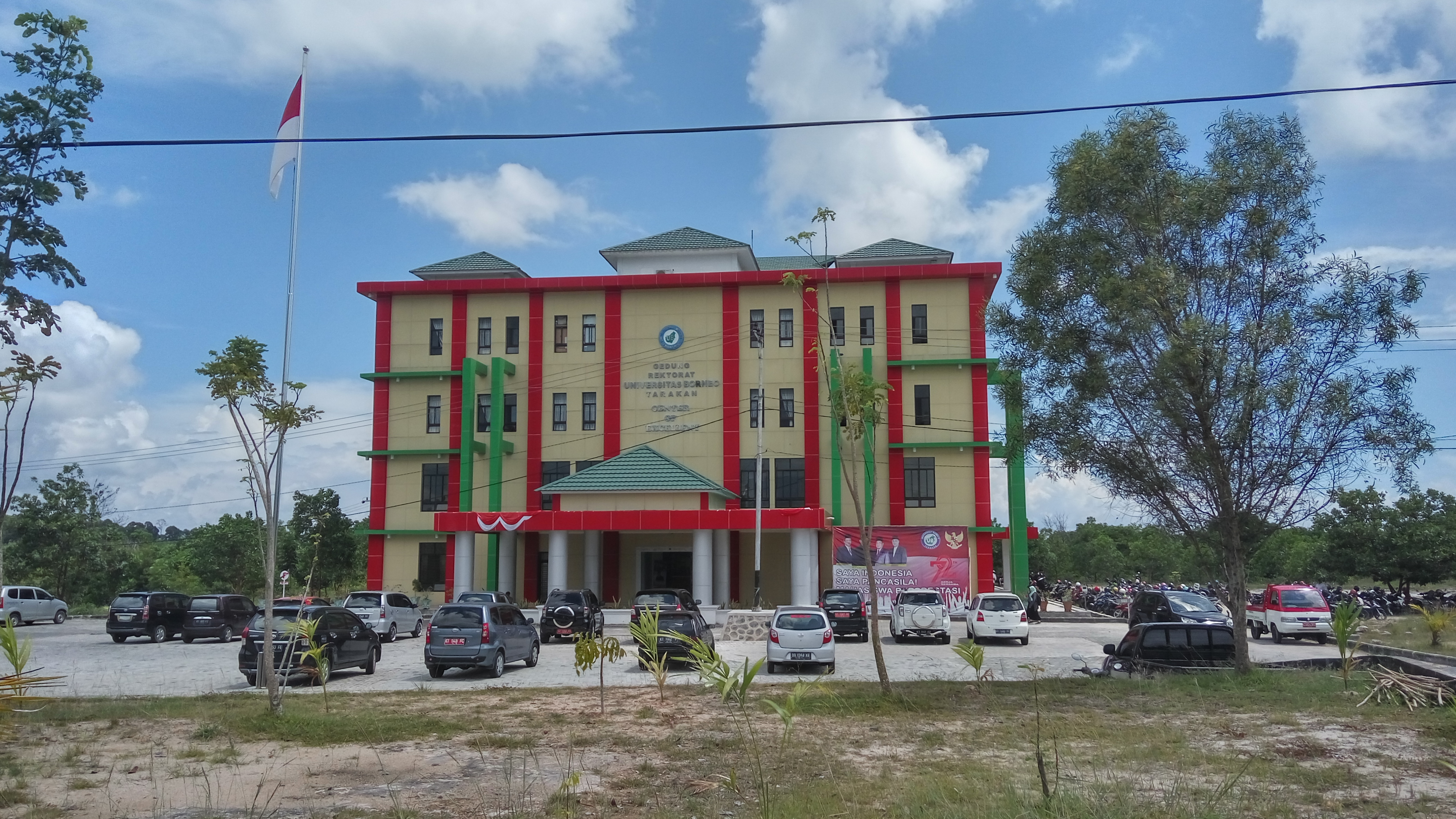
Borneo Tarakan University rector building

=== Places of worship ===
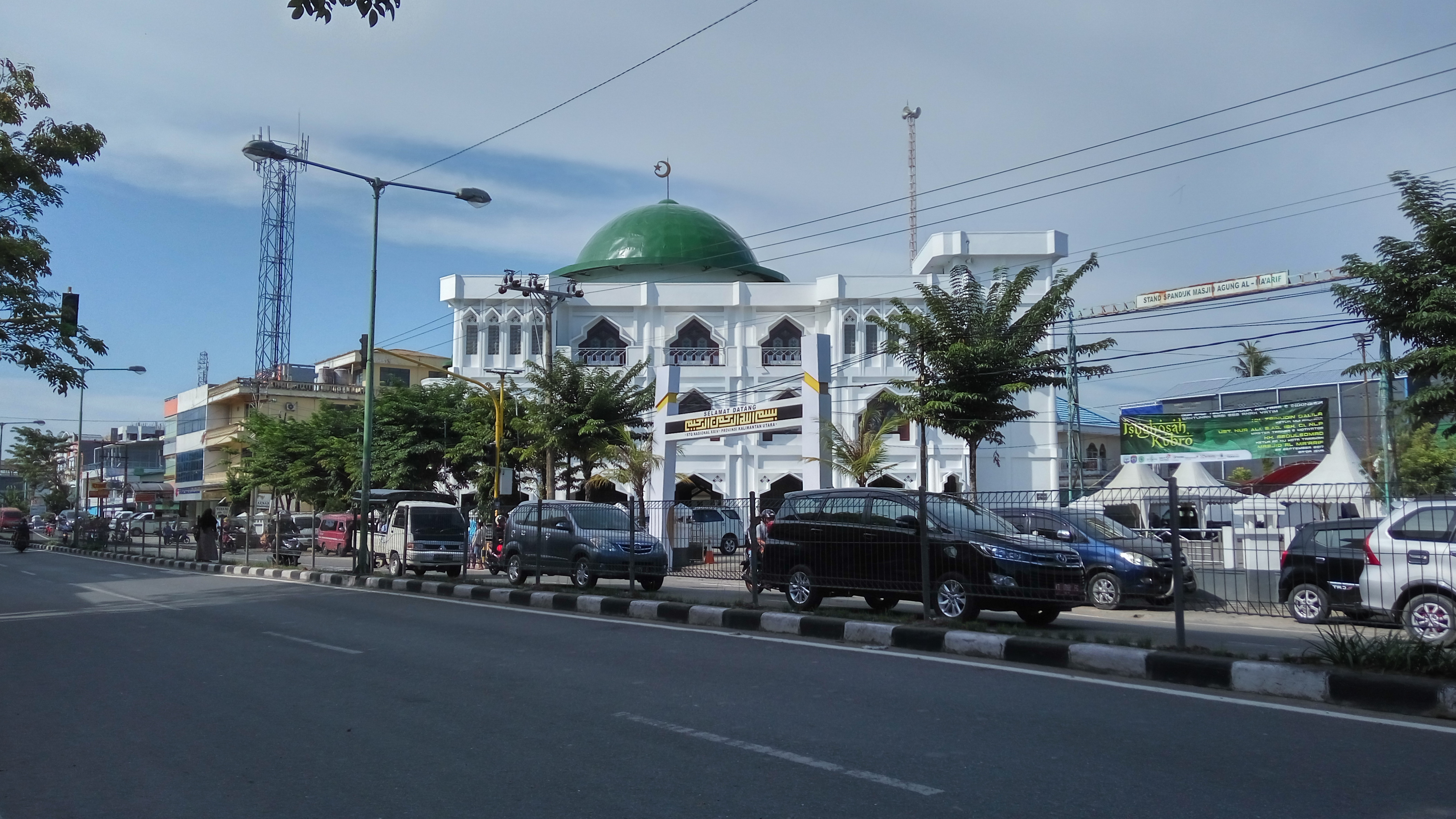
Al-Ma'arif Grand Mosque, Tarakan

There are 235 mosques, 93 churches, four Chinese Buddhist temples, and one Hindu temple. One of the biggest mosques, Al-Ma'arif Grand Mosque, was constructed in 1961 and is located in the Central Tarakan district. The only Hindu temple in the city, Pura Giri Jagat Nata, was inaugurated on 1994, and is used mostly by Balinese migrants. The Tarakan Islamic Center functions not only as a mosque but is also used for Islamic learning and various Islamic events. A popular local tourist spot, it was inaugurated in 2012.

=== Communication ===
The city has access to 4G and other telecommunication services. As with most Indonesian cities, the only fiber optic service provider in the city is IndiHome, which is state-owned under Telkomsel. The city has fiber optic cables connected to Balikpapan and Samarinda, which also serve other regencies of North Kalimantan.

== Transportation ==
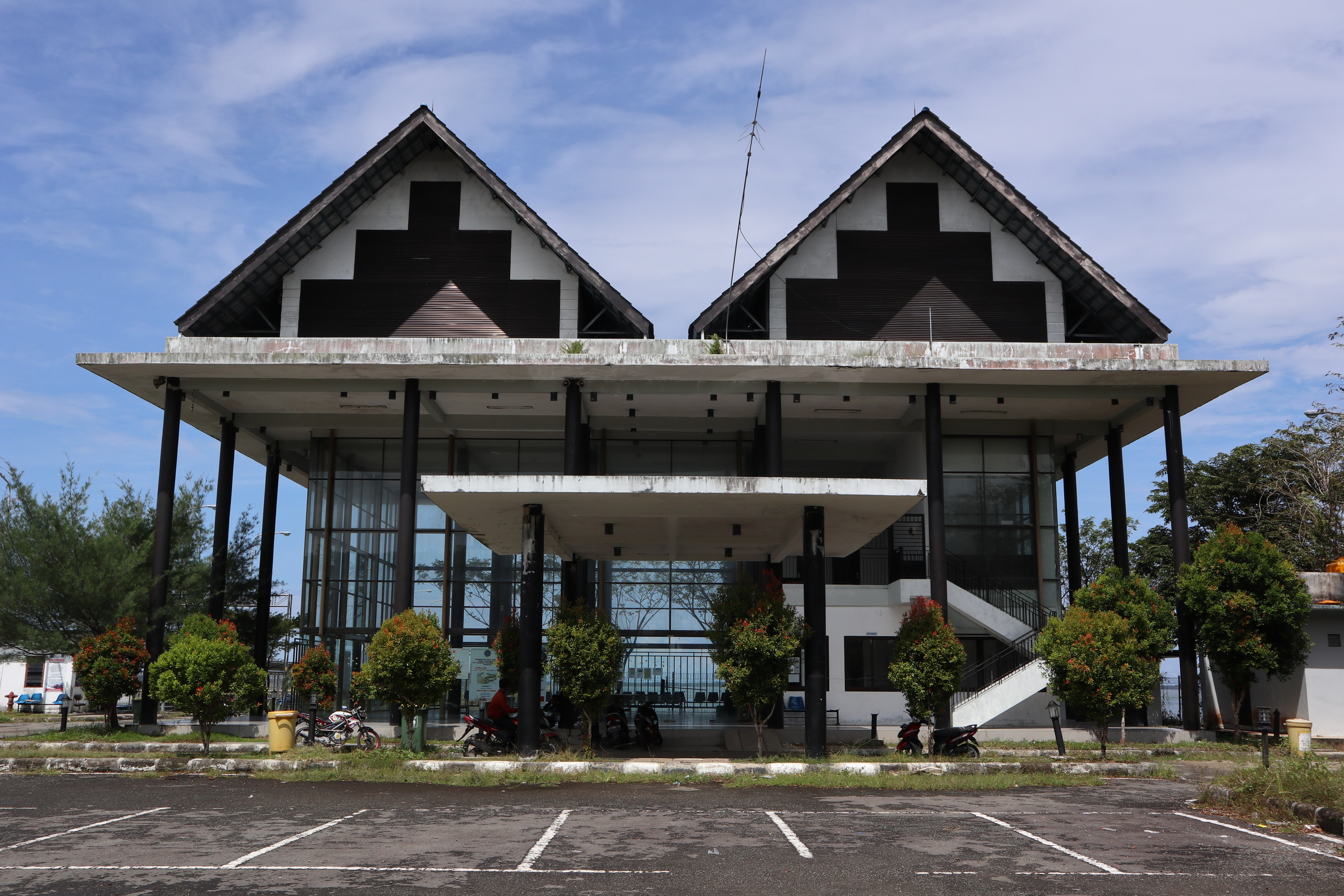
Juwata ferry terminal building in Tarakan

Several ferries serve Tarakan, linking it to other cities of eastern Borneo: Nunukan in North Kalimantan, Berau and Balikpapan in East Kalimantan, and Tawau in Sabah. The port also provides links to cities on other Indonesian islands—Sulawesi and Java.

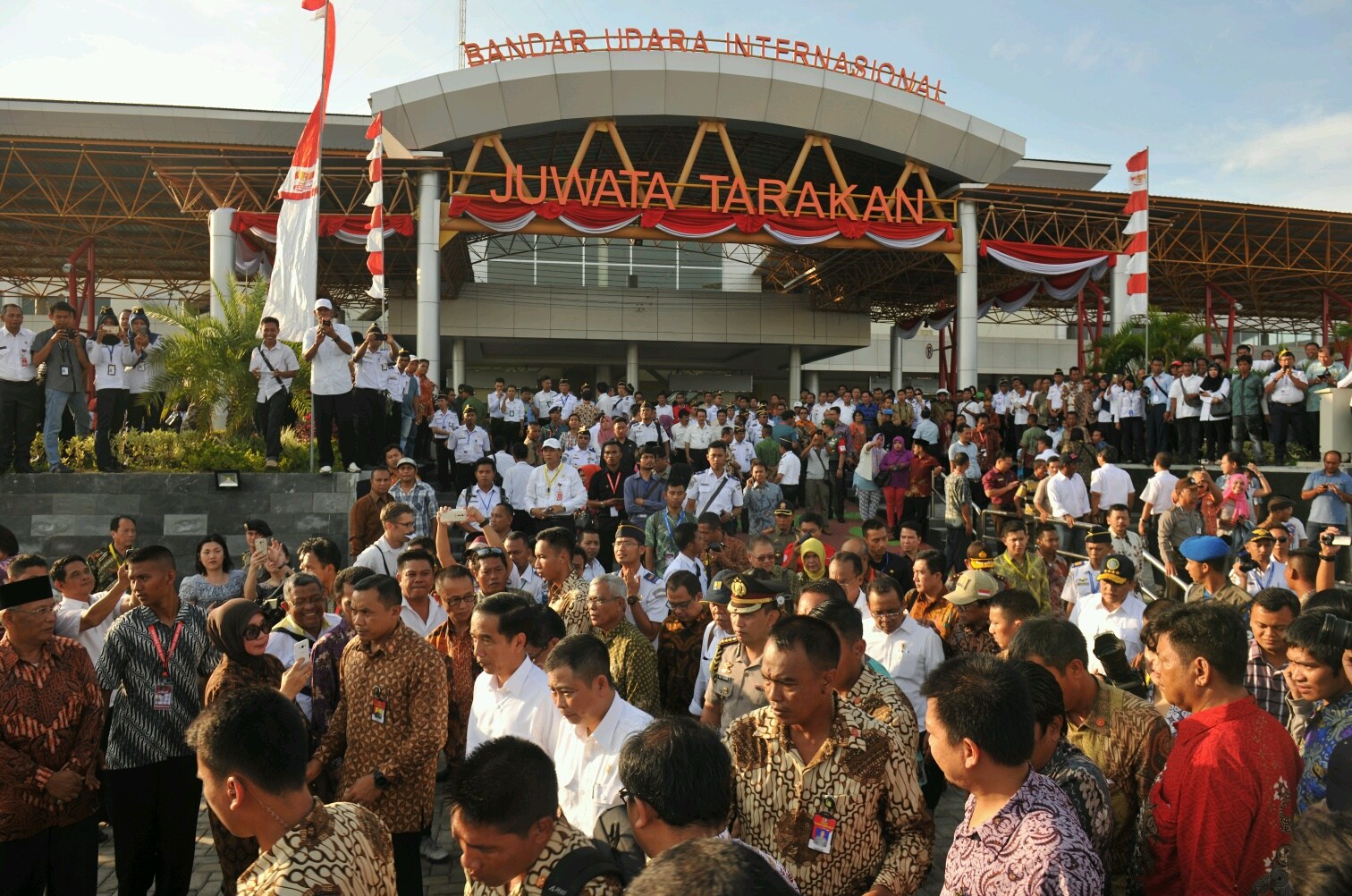
Inauguration of Juwata International Airport new terminal by President Joko Widodo

Tarakan has an airport, Juwata International Airport, located 3.5 kilometres (2.2 mi) from the city center. The airport handles domestic flight routes to Balikpapan, Jakarta, Surabaya, Denpasar and Makassar, as well as an international route to Tawau, Malaysia. On 2016, the airport terminal was expanded to provide for more than 2,000 passengers per day. There are 281.911 kilometres (175.171 mi) of road in the city of which 201.571 kilometres (125.250 mi) have been paved with asphalt. The city has a bus rapid transit system which connects the entire city. In addition, there are angkots (shared taxis) and online motorcycle taxi services provided by firms like Gojek and Grab, and conventional taxis.

There is a plan to build a bridge connecting the island to mainland Kalimantan, which is currently delayed because of the government refocusing fund allocations from development and infrastructure to COVID-19 pandemic mitigation.

== Economy ==
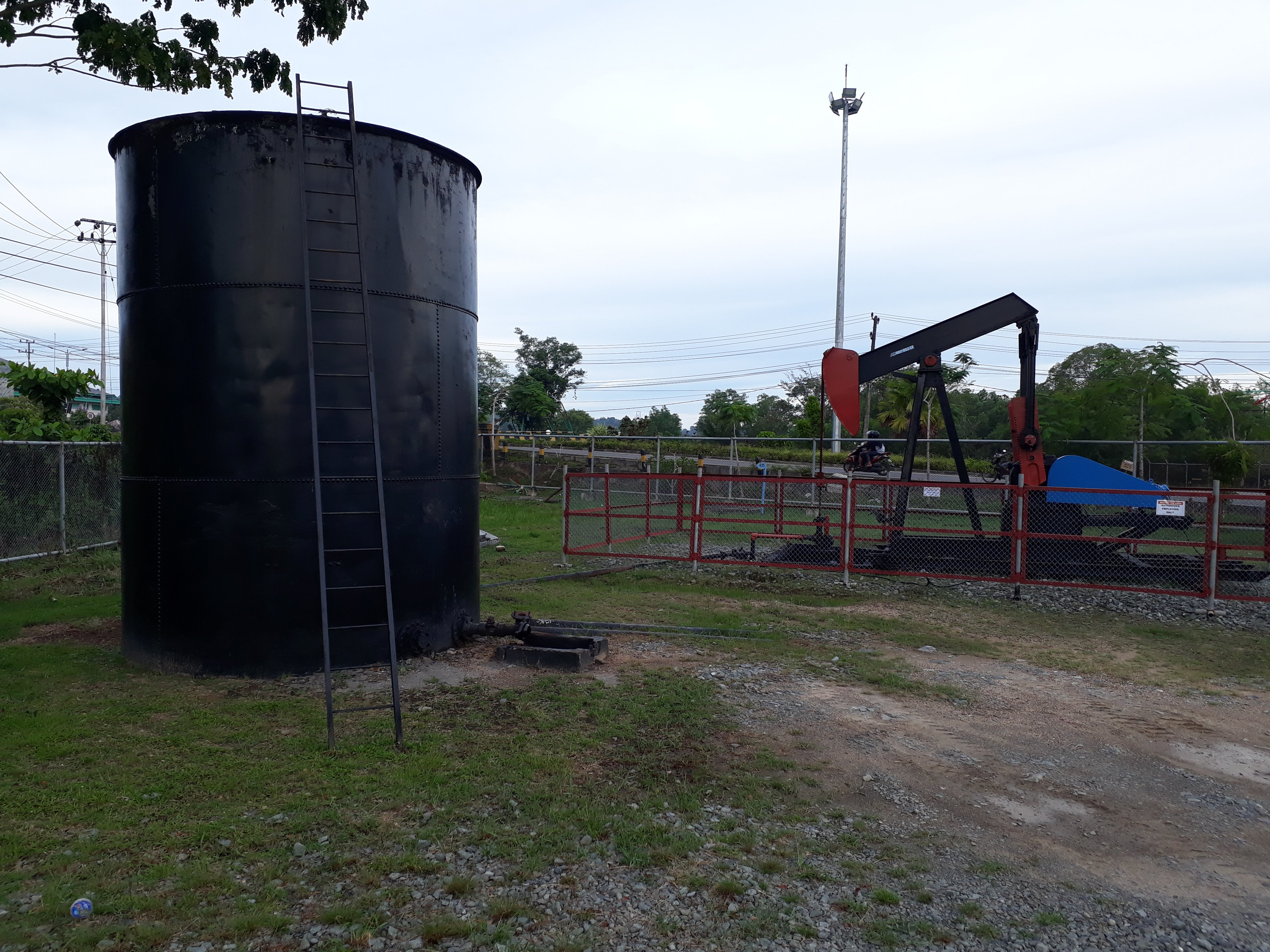
An oil field in Tarakan

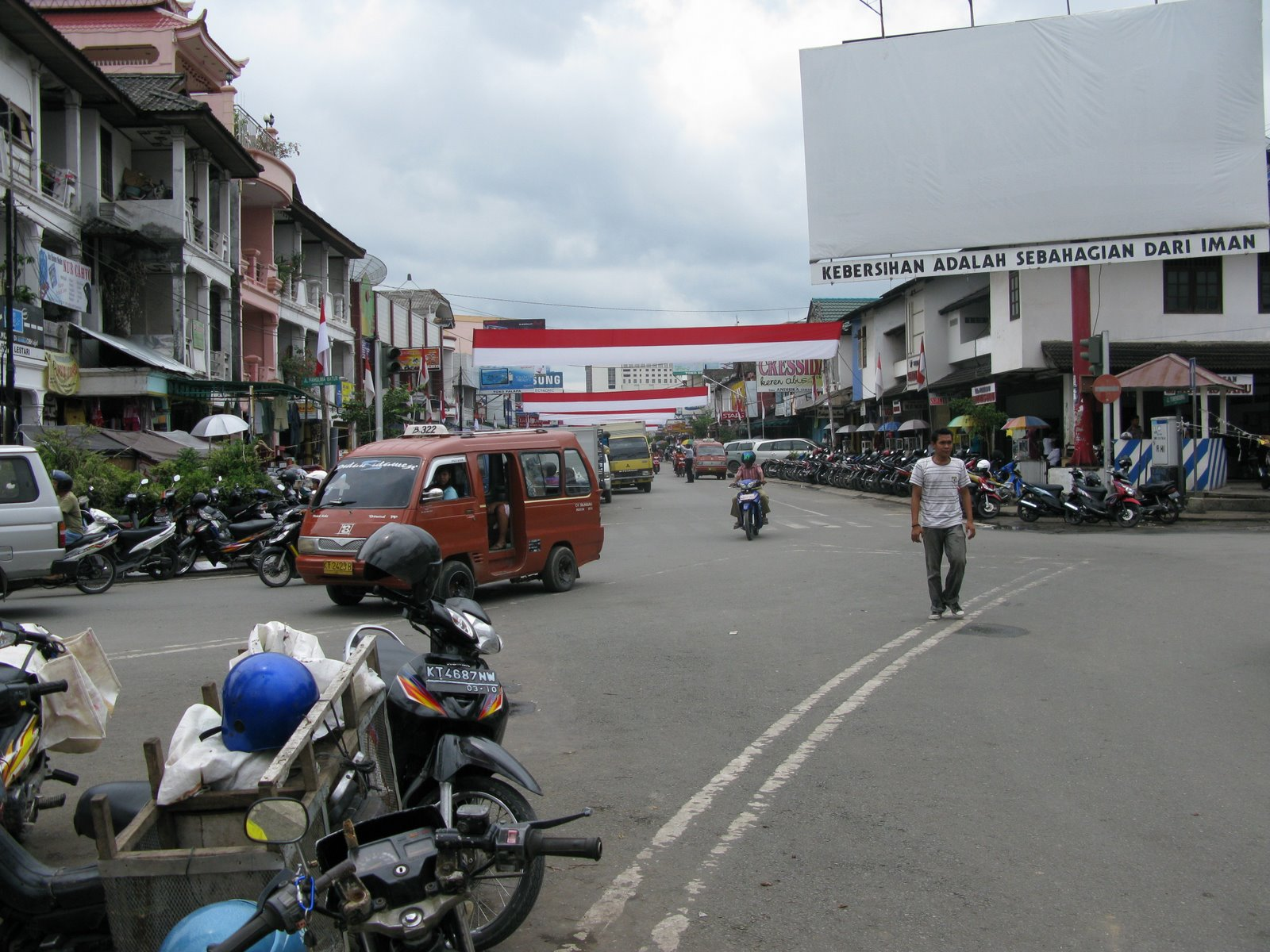
Tarakan city center in 2009

The city was once a leading oil producer in the Dutch East Indies; to-day however, oil only comprises six percent of the total Tarakan economy. Fisheries and processed products now dominate the economy. The city is still the biggest contributor to the North Kalimantan economy, contributing 37.05 percent. The economic growth in 2015 was 7.52 percent, which is above the national average. The unemployment rate in 2019 was 4.78 percent. There are 14 companies based in Tarakan as of 2019. As a result, in 2021 it is the 17th richest city in Indonesia. The poverty rate as of 2020 was around 6 percent.

The agriculture sector is small, with only 33 hectares (82 acres) being cultivated as paddy fields. It has been declining massively since 2018, with drops as high as 45.81 percent of crop yields. Other agriculture products such as cassava and sweet potatoes are also declining, with each only using around 174 hectares (430 acres) and 10 hectares (25 acres) respectively. Tourism has been a growing sector, with around 227,638 tourists visiting the city in 2019. There are 33 registered banks in the city as of 2020, consisting of 23 public banks and 10 private banking institutions.

== Governance ==
=== Administrative districts ===
The city is divided into four districts (kecamatan), tabulated below with their land areas and their populations at the 2010 census and 2020 Census, together with the official estimates as at mid 2024. The table also includes the number of subdistricts (all rated as urban kelurahan) in each district, and its postal codes.

Kode Wilayah	Name of District (kecamatan)	Area in km^{2}	Pop'n Census 2010	Pop'n Census 2020	Pop'n Estimate mid 2024	No. of subdistricts	Post codes
65.71.03	Tarakan Timur (East Tarakan)	58.01	42,973	58,500	62,380	7	77115 & 77123-77126
65.71.02	Tarakan Tengah (Central Tarakan)	55.54	60,608	69,740	71,180	5	77113-77114
65.71.01	Tarakan Barat (West Tarakan)	27.89	67,749	81,800	85,230	5	77111-77112
65.71.04	Tarakan Utara (North Tarakan)	109.36	22,040	32,740	36,520	3	77116
	Totals	250.80	193,370	242,786	255,310	20	

=== Local Government ===
As with all Indonesian cities, it is a second-level administrative division run by a mayor and vice mayor together with the city parliament, and it has a status equivalent to a regency. Executive power lies in the mayor and vice mayor, while legislative duties are carried out by local parliaments. The mayor, vice mayor, and parliament members are democratically elected by the people of the city in an election. The heads of districts are appointed directly by the city mayor with recommendations by the city secretary.

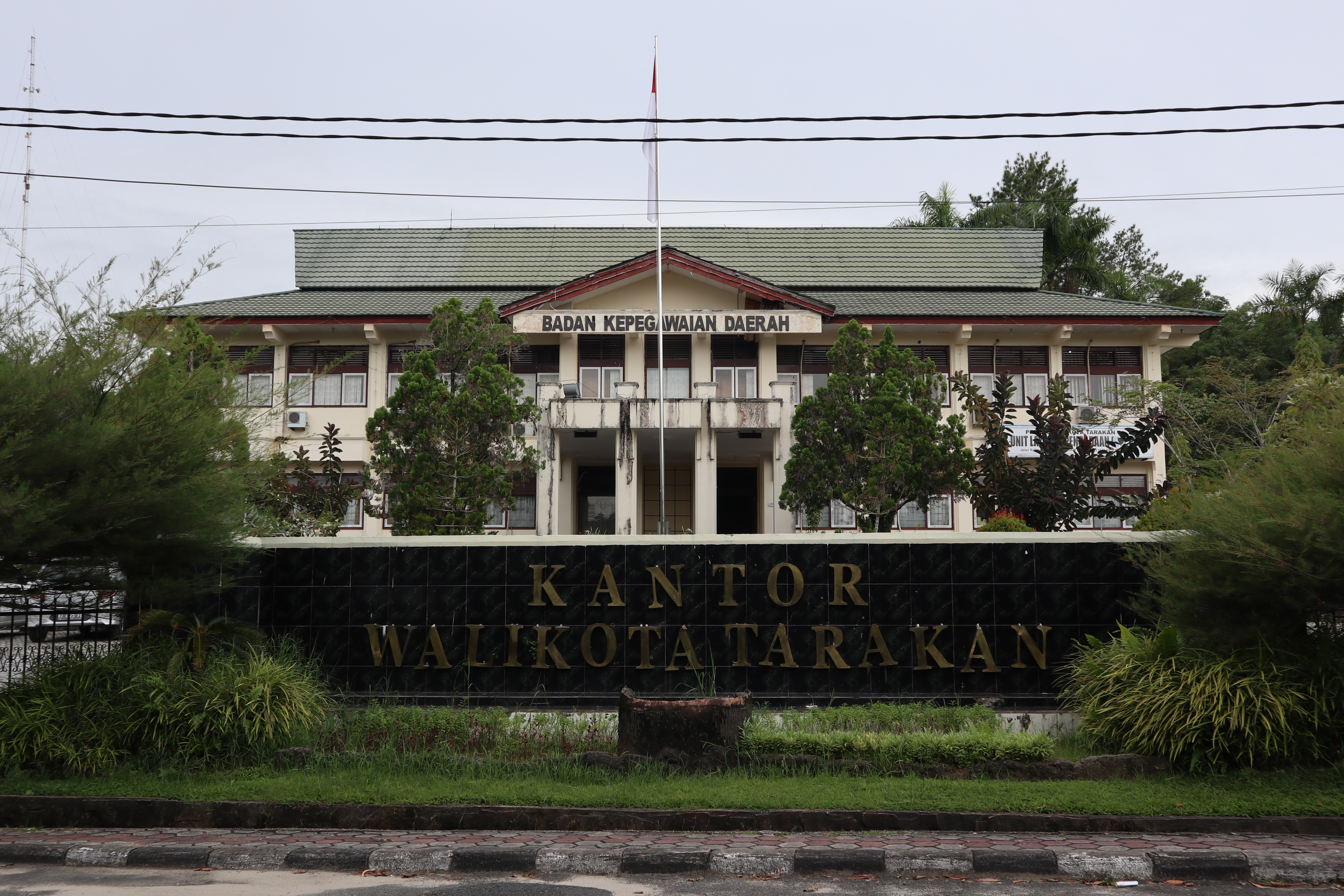
Tarakan city hall

=== Politics ===
Tarakan city is part of 1st electoral district for provincial parliament (North Kalimantan People's Representative Council), and have 12 out of 35 representatives there. In city level, it has its own parliament consist of 30 representatives divided into four electoral districts. The last election for parliament was on 17 April 2019 and the next one will be in the year 2024.

Electoral District	Region	Representatives
Tarakan 1st	Central Tarakan	9
Tarakan 2nd	East Tarakan	7
Tarakan 3rd	West Tarakan	10
Tarakan 4th	North Tarakan	4
Total		30

== Climate ==
Tarakan has a tropical rainforest climate (Af) with heavy rainfall year-round.

Climate data for Tarakan (Juwata Airport) (1991–2020 normals, extremes 2001–2023)
Month	Jan	Feb	Mar	Apr	May	Jun	Jul	Aug	Sep	Oct	Nov	Dec	Year
Mean daily maximum °C (°F)	30.5 (86.9)	30.8 (87.4)	31.0 (87.8)	31.1 (88.0)	31.4 (88.5)	31.2 (88.2)	31.1 (88.0)	31.4 (88.5)	31.5 (88.7)	31.4 (88.5)	31.1 (88.0)	30.9 (87.6)	31.1 (88.0)
Daily mean °C (°F)	27.0 (80.6)	27.3 (81.1)	27.5 (81.5)	27.7 (81.9)	27.9 (82.2)	27.7 (81.9)	27.4 (81.3)	27.7 (81.9)	27.5 (81.5)	27.5 (81.5)	27.5 (81.5)	27.3 (81.1)	27.5 (81.5)
Mean daily minimum °C (°F)	24.2 (75.6)	24.5 (76.1)	24.6 (76.3)	24.7 (76.5)	24.9 (76.8)	24.8 (76.6)	24.5 (76.1)	24.5 (76.1)	24.3 (75.7)	24.5 (76.1)	24.8 (76.6)	24.4 (75.9)	24.6 (76.2)
Average precipitation mm (inches)	244.7 (9.63)	192.1 (7.56)	310.7 (12.23)	318.6 (12.54)	321.9 (12.67)	260.7 (10.26)	277.0 (10.91)	249.3 (9.81)	276.7 (10.89)	314.8 (12.39)	314.0 (12.36)	317.4 (12.50)	3,397.9 (133.75)
Average precipitation days	14.9	13.1	17.2	17.1	18.9	16.3	15.6	14.0	14.5	18.0	18.7	17.7	196
Mean monthly sunshine hours	117.1	143.2	137.4	146.0	169.0	147.4	169.4	184.7	163.9	156.4	131.7	126.6	1,792.8
Source: Starlings Roost Weather

== See also ==
- List of regencies and cities of Indonesia
