= Hiyō-class aircraft carrier =

Aircraft carrier class of the Imperial Japanese Navy

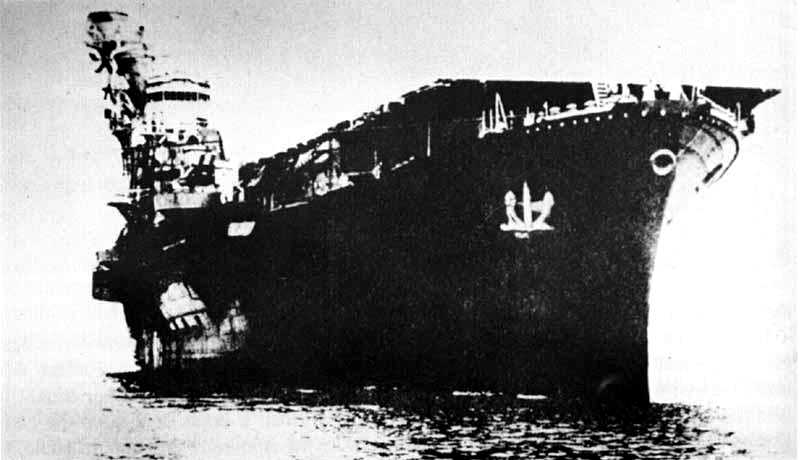
- Hiyō at anchor

Class overview
- Builders: Kawasaki Shipyard, Kobe; Mitsubishi Shipyard, Nagasaki
- Operators: Imperial Japanese Navy
- Preceded by: Shōkaku class
- Succeeded by: Taihō
- Built: 1939–1942
- In commission: 1942–1945
- Completed: 2
- Lost: 1
- Scrapped: 1

General characteristics (Jun'yō as built)
- Type: Aircraft carrier
- Displacement: 24,150 t (23,770 long tons) (standard)
- Length: 219.32 m (719 ft 7 in) (o/a)
- Beam: 26.7 m (87 ft 7 in)
- Draft: 8.15 m (26 ft 9 in)
- Installed power: 6 Kampon water-tube boilers; 56,250 shp (41,950 kW)
- Propulsion: 2 shafts; 2 geared steam turbine sets
- Speed: 25.5 knots (47.2 km/h; 29.3 mph)
- Range: 11,700 nmi (21,700 km; 13,500 mi) at 18 knots (33 km/h; 21 mph)
- Complement: 1,187–1,224
- Sensors & processing systems: 1 × Type 2, Mark 2, Model 1 early-warning radar
- Armament: 6 × twin 12.7 cm (5 in) Type 89 dual-purpose guns; 8 × triple 25 mm (1 in) Type 96 AA guns
- Armor: Belt: 25–50 mm (0.98–1.97 in)
- Aircraft carried: 54

The two Hiyō-class aircraft carriers (飛鷹型航空母艦, Hiyō-gata kōkūbokan) were built for the Imperial Japanese Navy (IJN) during World War II. Both ships of the class, Hiyō and Jun'yō, were originally laid down as luxury passenger liners before being acquired by the IJN for conversion to aircraft carriers in 1941. Jun'yō was the first of the sister ships to be completed in May 1942 and the ship participated in the invasion of the Aleutian Islands the following month. Both ships participated in several battles during the Guadalcanal Campaign in late 1942. Their aircraft were disembarked several times and used from land bases in a number of battles in the South West Pacific.

Hiyō was torpedoed in June 1943 and Jun'yō in November; both ships spent about three months under repair. They spent most of the time after their repairs training and ferrying aircraft before returning to combat. Hiyō was sunk by a gasoline vapor explosion caused by an American aerial torpedo hit during the Battle of the Philippine Sea in mid-1944 while Jun'yō was damaged by several bombs. Lacking aircraft, she was used as a transport in late 1944 and was torpedoed in December. The ship was under repair until March 1945 when the repairs were deemed uneconomical. Jun'yō was then effectively hulked for the rest of the war. After the surrender of Japan in September, the Americans deemed the ship not worth her repair costs; she was broken up in 1946–1947.

== Design and description ==
The ships were ordered as the fast luxury Kashiwara Maru-class passenger liners (橿原丸級貨客船, Kashiwara Maru-kyū kakyakusen) as respectively Kashiwara Maru and Izumo Maru, by the Nippon Yusen Kaisha (Japan Mail Steamship Company-NYK) in late 1938. In exchange for a 60% subsidy of their building costs by the Navy Ministry, they were designed to be converted to aircraft carriers. To facilitate this process, they were fitted with a double hull, additional fuel oil capacity, provisions for the fitting of additional transverse and longitudinal bulkheads, installation of a longitudinal bulkhead to separate the turbine rooms, a strengthened main deck, more height between decks, rearrangement of the superstructure and passenger accommodations to facilitate the installation of aircraft elevators and hangars, more space for additional wiring, installation of a bulbous bow and the addition of aviation gasoline storage tanks fore and aft of the machinery spaces. NYK was only interested in a maximum speed of 24 knots (44 km/h; 28 mph) to save fuel, but the Navy wanted a maximum speed of no less than 25.5 knots (47.2 km/h; 29.3 mph) so they compromised by limiting the performance of the turbines to 80% of maximum power during peacetime.

The ships had a length of about 219.32 meters (719 ft 7 in) overall. They had a beam of 26.7 meters (87 ft 7 in) and a draft of 8.15 meters (26 ft 9 in). They displaced 24,150 metric tons (23,770 long tons) at standard load. Their crew ranged from 1,187 to 1,224 officers and enlisted men.

Both ships were fitted with a pair of Mitsubishi-Curtis geared steam turbine sets with a total of 56,250 shaft horsepower (41,950 kW), each driving a 5.5-meter (18 ft) propeller. Steam was provided by six water-tube boilers; Jun'yō had Mitsubishi three-drum boilers that operated at a pressure of 40 kg/cm^{2} (3,923 kPa; 569 psi) and temperature of 420 °C (788 °F) while Hiyō had Kawasaki-LaMont boilers. Their machinery, designed for merchant service, was over four times heavier than that of the purpose-built aircraft carrier Hiryū. The ships had a designed speed of 25.5 knots, but both exceeded that by small margins during their sea trials. They carried 4,100 metric tons (4,000 long tons) of fuel oil which gave them a range of 11,700 nautical miles (21,700 km; 13,500 mi) or more at 18 knots (33 km/h; 21 mph).

=== Flight deck arrangements ===
The flight deck was 210.3 meters (690 ft 0 in) long and had a maximum width of 27.3 meters (89 ft 7 in). A large island was fitted on the starboard side that, for the first time in a Japanese carrier, was integrated with the ship's funnel. This was angled 26° outwards to help keep its exhaust from interfering with flight operations. The ships were designed with two superimposed hangars, each approximately 153 meters (502 ft 0 in) long, 15 meters (49 ft 3 in) wide and 5 meters (16 ft 5 in) high. Each hangar could be subdivided by four fire curtains and they were fitted with fire fighting foam dispensers on each side. The hangars were served by two square elevators with rounded corners, 14.03 meters (46 ft 0 in) on each side. The elevators had a maximum capacity of 5,000 kilograms (11,000 lb) and took 15 seconds to go from the lower hangar to the flight deck. The ships were fitted with electrically operated Kure type model 4 arresting gear with nine cables. They also mounted two Type 3 crash barricades. No aircraft catapult was fitted. The ships mounted a crane on the port side of the flight deck, just aft of the rear elevator. When collapsed, it was flush with the flight deck.

Their air group was originally intended to consist of 12 Mitsubishi A5M "Claude" fighters, plus 4 in storage, 18 Aichi D3A "Val" dive bombers, with an additional 2 in reserve, and 18 Nakajima B5N "Kate" torpedo bombers. This was revised to substitute a dozen Mitsubishi A6M Zero fighters, plus 3 in storage, for the A5Ms by the time the ships were commissioned in 1942. As a result of the lessons learned from the Battle of Midway in June, the ships' fighter complement was strengthened to 21 Zeros, and the B5Ns were reduced to 9. By the end of the year, 6 more Zeros replaced an equal number of D3As, giving totals of 27 A6Ms, 12 D3As and 9 B5Ns. Although it was possible to fit all these aircraft into the hangars, 8 or 9 were usually stored on the flight deck to reduce crowding below decks.

=== Armor, armament and sensors ===
As a conversion from an ocean liner, it was not possible to add much armor, although the ships had a double hull. Two plates of Ducol steel, each 25 mm (0.98 in) thick, protected the sides of the ships' machinery spaces. Their aviation gasoline tanks and magazines were protected by one layer of Ducol steel. In addition, their machinery spaces were further subdivided by transverse and longitudinal bulkheads to limit any flooding.

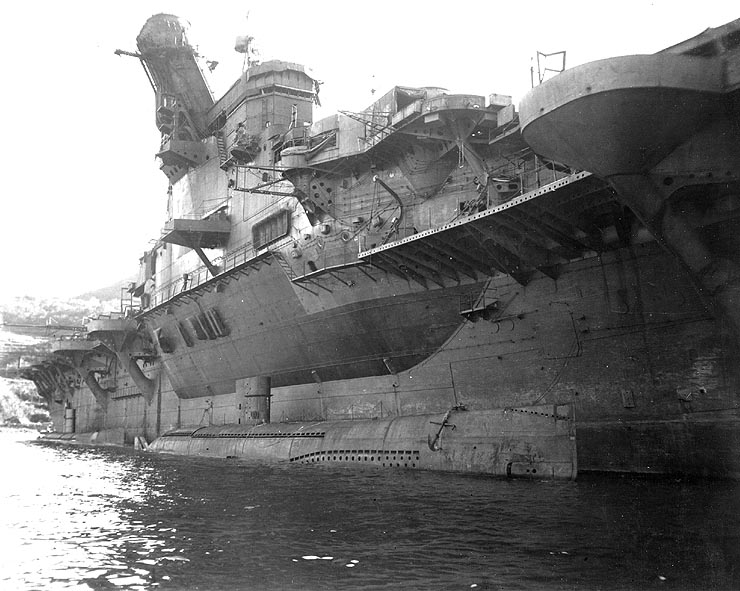
View of the starboard side of Jun'yō at Sasebo, Japan, 26 September 1945

The primary armament consisted of a dozen 40-caliber 12.7 cm Type 89 anti-aircraft (AA) guns in twin mounts on sponsons along the sides of the hull. They fired 23.45-kilogram (51.7 lb) projectiles at a rate between 8 and 14 rounds per minute at a muzzle velocity of 700–725 m/s (2,300–2,380 ft/s); at 45°, this provided a maximum range of 14,800 meters (16,200 yd), and a maximum ceiling of 9,400 meters (30,800 ft). The ships were also initially equipped with eight triple 25 mm Type 96 light AA guns alongside the flight deck. They fired .25-kilogram (0.55 lb) projectiles at a muzzle velocity of 900 m/s (3,000 ft/s); this provided a maximum range of 7,500 meters (8,202 yd), and an effective ceiling of 5,500 meters (18,000 ft) at +85°. The maximum effective rate of fire was only between 110 and 120 rounds per minute due to the frequent need to change the fifteen-round magazines.

In mid-1943, four more triple mounts were added and another four triple mounts in late 1943–early 1944. Two of these last four mounts were mounted on the stern and the others were placed in front of and behind the island. A dozen single mounts were also added, some of which were portable and could be mounted on tie-down points on the flight deck. After the Battle of the Philippine Sea in June 1944, Jun'yō's anti-aircraft armament was reinforced with three more triple mounts, two twin mounts and 18 single mounts for the 25 mm Type 96 gun. These guns were supplemented by six 28-round AA rocket launchers. Each 12-centimeter (4.7 in) rocket weighed 22.5 kilograms (50 lb) and had a maximum velocity of 200 m/s (660 ft/s). Their maximum range was 4,800 meters (5,200 yd). In October 1944, Jun'yō had a total of 91 25 mm barrels; 57 in 19 triple mounts, four in two twin mounts, and 30 single mounts.

Two Type 94 high-angle fire-control directors, one on each side of the ship, were fitted to control the Type 89 guns. Each director mounted a 4.5-meter (14 ft 9 in) rangefinder. When Jun'yō first commissioned only the rangefinders were fitted and the directors were added later. Four Type 95 directors controlled the 25 mm guns and another pair were added in early 1943. Early warning was provided by two Type 2, Mark 2, Model 1 air search radars. The first of these was mounted on the top of the island in mid- to late 1942 on each ship, and the other was added during 1943. This latter system was fitted on the port side of the hull, outboard of the rear elevator. A smaller Type 3, Mark 1, Model 3 air search radar was added in 1944 on Jun'yō.

== Ships ==
Construction data
Ship	Kanji	Original name	Builder	Laid down	Launched	Commissioned	Fate
Hiyō	飛鷹	Izumo Maru (出雲丸)	Kawasaki Heavy Industries, Kobe	30 November 1939	24 June 1941	31 July 1942	Sunk, 21 June 1944, during the Battle of the Philippine Sea
Jun'yō	隼鷹	Kashiwara Maru (橿原丸)	Mitsubishi Heavy Industries, Nagasaki	20 March 1939	26 June 1941	3 May 1942	Scrapped, 1946–1947

== Service history ==
The ships were purchased on 10 February 1941 by the Navy Ministry for the price of ¥48,346,000 and their armament and aircraft cost an additional ¥27,800,000. The cost to convert the two ships was budgeted at ¥38,073,000, for a grand total of ¥114,219,000. Kashiwara Maru and Izumo Maru were temporarily referred to as No. 1001 Ship (Dai 1001 bankan) and No. 1002 Ship respectively to keep their conversions secret. Jun'yō was initially classified as an auxiliary aircraft carrier (Tokusetsu kokubokan), but following the loss of four Japanese fleet carriers in the Battle of Midway, she was redesignated as a regular carrier (Kokubokan) in July; Hiyō, completed after the loss of the carriers, received that designation from the beginning.

Despite being launched several days after Hiyō, Jun'yō was the first of the pair to be commissioned in May 1942. She was assigned to the Fourth Carrier Division of the 1st Air Fleet, together with Ryūjō. The ship was tasked to support the invasion of the Aleutian Islands, an operation designed to coincide with the attack on Midway. Jun'yō carried 18 A6M2 Zeros and 18 D3As for this operation. The ship launched her first airstrike at dawn on 3 June against Dutch Harbor on Unalaska Island. She accomplished little during this operation, losing five aircraft to all causes, and her own aircraft only shot down five American aircraft.

Upon arrival at Truk on 9 October, the two sisters were assigned to the Second Carrier Division to begin operations against American forces in the Guadalcanal area as part of the 3rd Fleet. On 15 October, the two carriers reached the vicinity of Malaita Island in the Solomon Islands and their aircraft discovered a resupply convoy for Guadalcanal that was escorted by the destroyer Meredith. Their aircraft attacked and sank the destroyer. The next day, they found the small seaplane tender, McFarland, in Lunga Roads offloading avgas into barges. Dive bombers from the sisters blew the ship's stern off, but failed to sink McFarland. The two carriers were intended to play a prominent role in the Japanese effort to retake Guadalcanal Island and were assigned to the Advance Force for this operation. Their aircraft were supposed to provide air cover after the Japanese night attack that retook Henderson Field and then they were to be flown ashore, but Hiyō's machinery problems caused her to return to Truk. Some of her aircraft were transferred to her sister before she departed.

In late October 1942, during the Guadalcanal Campaign, Jun'yō took part in the Battle of the Santa Cruz Islands. At this time, her air group consisted of 18 Zeros, 18 D3As and 9 B5Ns. Her aircraft made hits on the carrier Hornet, the battleship South Dakota and the light cruiser San Juan, but inflicted little substantial damage. A torpedo hit from one of her B5Ns, however, did force the Americans to abandon their effort to repair Hornet. During this time, Hiyō's remaining aircraft flew to Rabaul on 23 October where they provided air cover for Japanese forces on Guadalcanal. A detachment from the air group was transferred to Buin, Papua New Guinea on 1 November and participated in the Naval Battle of Guadalcanal later in the month. Those aircraft that remained at Rabaul flew back to Truk by 11 November, but the Buin detachment was ferried back to Japan on 14 December.

In mid-November 1942, Jun'yō was tasked to provide air cover for the convoy bringing reinforcements for the Japanese forces on Guadalcanal during the three-day-long Naval Battle of Guadalcanal. The ship's fighters were unable to do so; seven transports were sunk and the remaining four transports were damaged. In December 1942 – January 1943, the carrier covered several convoys that brought reinforcements to Wewak, New Guinea and her air group was based there for several days to protect the forces there before returning to Truk on 20 January. The ship then covered the evacuation of forces from Guadalcanal through early February.

Hiyō had returned to Japan in December and Jun'yō followed in February. Both ships returned to Truk in late March and their air groups were detached from in early April to participate in Operation I-Go, a land-based aerial offensive against Allied bases in the Solomon Islands and New Guinea. The ships returned to Japan in late May and sailed for Truk on 7 June, but Hiyō was torpedoed that evening and forced to return to port for repairs. Her fighters were flown to Truk by 15 July and assigned to the light carrier Ryūhō. The ship was under repair at Yokosuka until 15 September. Jun'yō's air group was deployed to Buin, Papua New Guinea on 2 July in response to the American invasion of Rendova Island on 30 June. Leaving her aircraft behind, the carrier returned to Japan in late July.

Jun'yō ferried aircraft to Singapore in mid-August and troops and equipment to the Caroline Islands the following month. On 5 November 1943, she was hit by a torpedo, but the damage was light, other than the disabled rudder. The ship was under repair and refit until 29 February 1944 at Kure. The air groups of both carriers were reconstituted at Singapore on 1 November. The aircraft transferred to Truk on 1 December and then to Kavieng at the end of December before reaching Rabaul on 25 January 1944; the survivors were back at Truk on 20 February and the air group was disbanded.

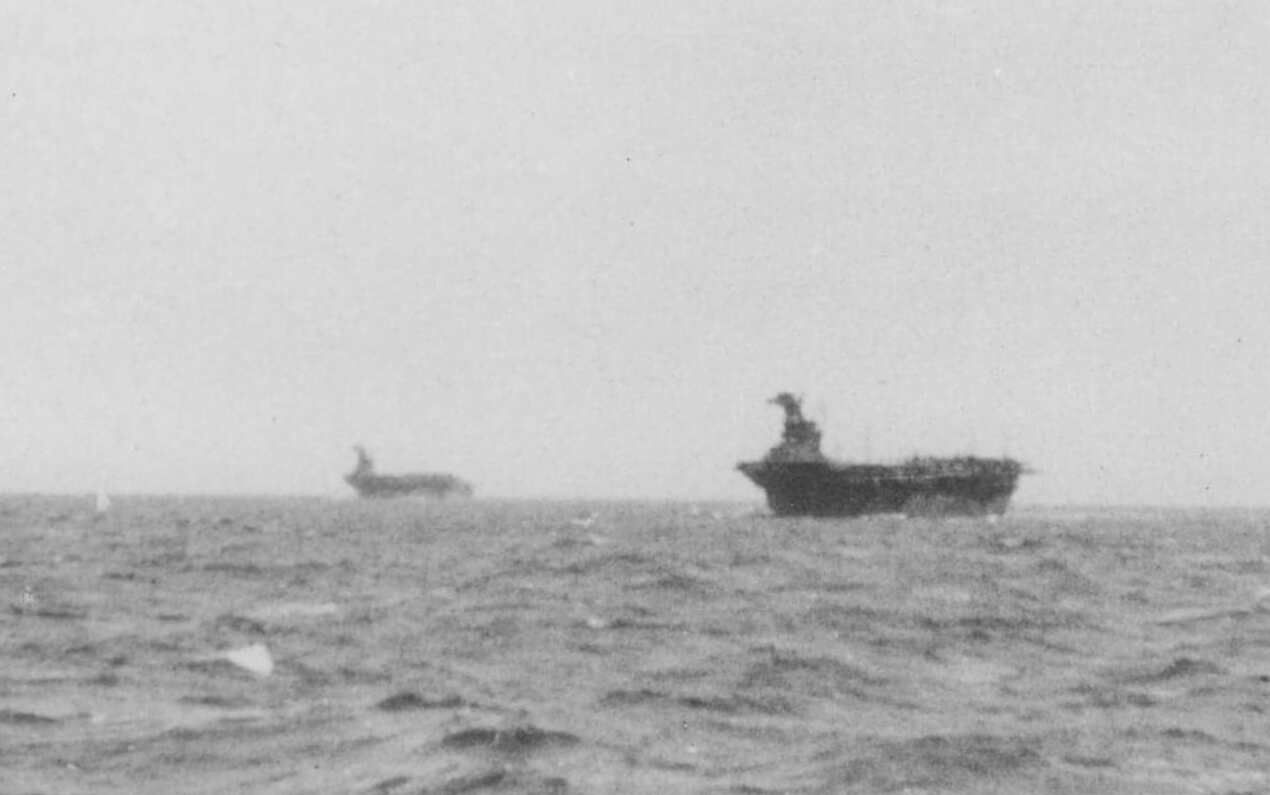
Hiyō and Jun'yō sailing to Tawi-Tawi, 13 May 1944

Hiyō departed Japan for Singapore on 24 November. She arrived on 3 December and was almost immediately assigned duties as an aircraft ferry until January when the ship returned to Japan. In the meantime, the Japanese Navy had restructured its carrier air groups so that one air group was assigned to one carrier division and Air Group 652 was assigned to the 2nd Carrier Division with Hiyō, Jun'yō and Ryūhō on 1 March. The air group was last in priority to be rebuilt and only had 30 Model 21 Zeros, 13 Model 52 Zeros and 4 D3As on hand on 1 April of its authorized 81 fighters, 36 dive bombers and 27 torpedo bombers. The ships conducted training for their aircraft in the Inland Sea until 11 May when she sailed for Tawi-Tawi in the Philippines. The new base was closer to the oil wells in Borneo on which the Navy relied and also to the Palau and western Caroline Islands where the Japanese expected the next American attack. However, the location lacked an airfield on which to train the green pilots and American submarines were very active in the vicinity which restricted the ships to the anchorage.

=== Battle of the Philippine Sea ===
The Japanese fleet was en route to Guimaras Island in the central Philippines on 13 June, where they intended to practice carrier operations in an area better protected from submarines, when Vice Admiral Jisaburō Ozawa learned of the American attack on the Mariana Islands the previous day. Upon reaching Guimaras, the fleet refuelled and sortied into the Philippine Sea where they spotted Task Force 58 on 18 June. The Americans failed to locate Ozawa's ships that day and the Japanese turned south to maintain a constant distance between them and the American carriers as Ozawa had decided on launching his air strikes early the following morning. At this time, Air Group 652 consisted of 81 Zeros, 27 D3As, 9 Yokosuka D4Y "Judy" dive bombers and 18 Nakajima B6N "Jill" torpedo bombers, roughly evenly divided among the three ships. The three carriers launched multiple air strikes against the American ships, but generally failed to locate them and did not inflict any damage while losing most of their aircraft.

At dusk, the Japanese turned away to the northwest to regroup and to refuel and the Americans turned west to close the distance. They discovered the retiring Japanese fleet during the afternoon of the following day and Vice Admiral Marc Mitscher ordered an air strike launched. Hiyō was struck by two bombs, one of which detonated above the bridge and killed or wounded virtually everyone there. More seriously, the ship was struck by one torpedo dropped by a Grumman TBF Avenger from Belleau Wood. This knocked out the starboard engine room and started fires, but Hiyō was able to continue, albeit at a slower speed. Two hours later, a large explosion occurred when leaking gasoline vapor ignited and it knocked out all power on the ship. The fires raged out of control and Hiyō sank stern first shortly afterwards at 16°20′N 132°32′E. Roughly 1,000 men were rescued by her escorting destroyers, but 247 officers and enlisted men died aboard the carrier.

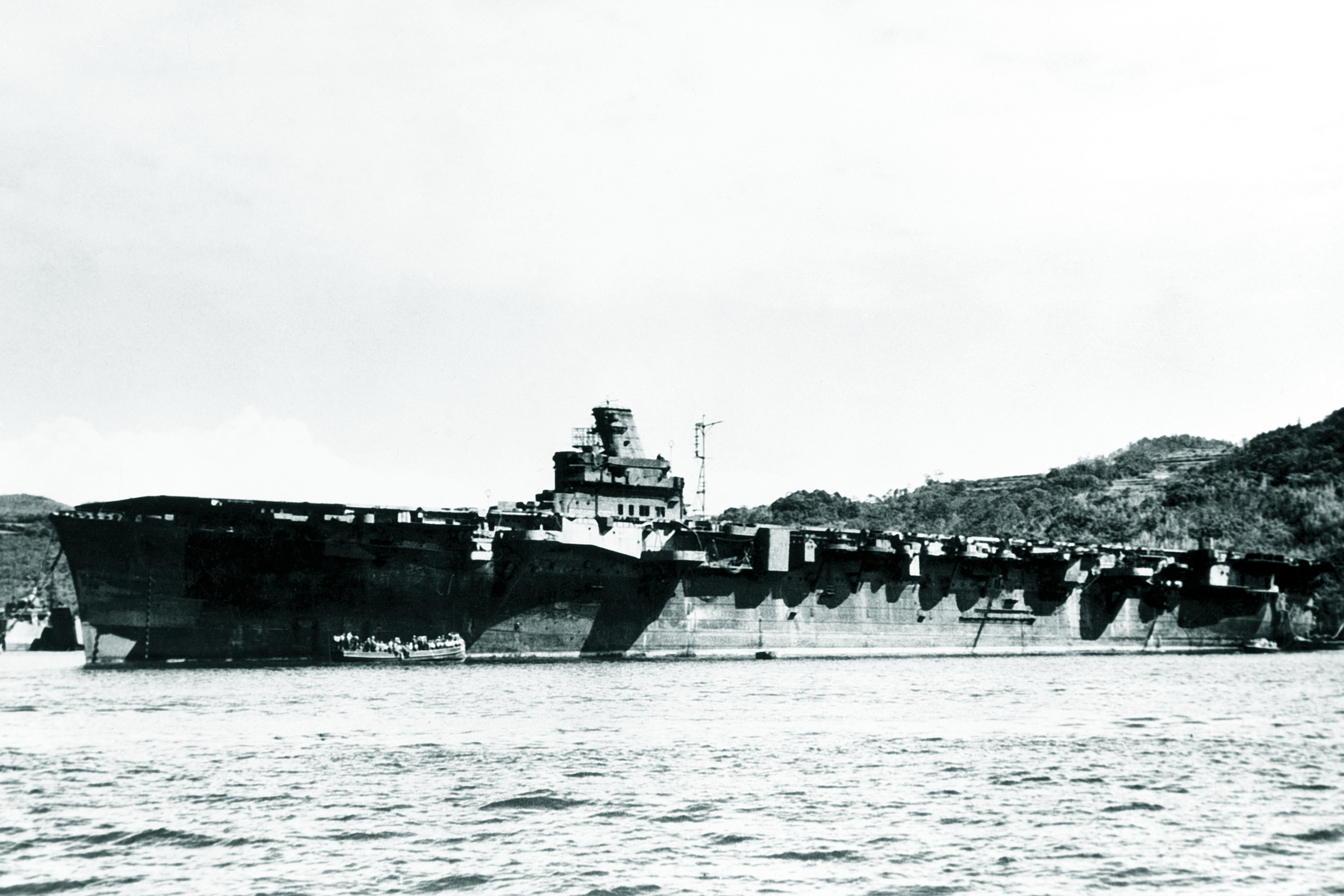
Jun'yō at anchor at Sasebo, 1945

Jun'yō was hit by two bombs near her island. The ship was not badly damaged, but the damage did stop flight operations. Air Group 652 claimed 2 Grumman F6F Hellcat fighters and 9 Grumman TBF Avenger torpedo bombers shot down, but lost 11 aircraft, plus another 3 that had to ditch. By the end of the battle, the air group only consisted of 11 A6M5s, 5 A6M2s and 1 B6N and it was disbanded on 10 July. Most of its remaining personnel were assigned to Air Group 653.

After repairs at Kure, the ship remained in the Inland Sea without aircraft until 27 October when she was tasked to transport material to Borneo. On 3 November, she was attacked by the submarine Pintado, but her escorting destroyer, Akikaze, deliberately sacrificed herself by intercepting the torpedoes and sank with no survivors. While returning from Manila, Jun'yō was attacked by the submarines Sea Devil, Plaice and Redfish early in the morning of 9 December 1944. She was hit by three torpedoes, but she was able to proceed on one engine. She reached Sasebo the following day and began repairs on 18 December.

The repairs were abandoned in March 1945 for lack of materials and the ship was moved from the dock to Ebisu Bay, Sasebo on 1 April. Efforts to camouflage the ship began on 23 April and she was reclassified as a guard ship on 20 June. Jun'yō's armament was ordered removed on 5 August and the ship was surrendered to the Allies on 2 September. An American technical team evaluated the ship's condition on 8 October and deemed her a constructive total loss. Jun'yō was stricken from the Navy List on 30 November and scrapped between 1 June 1946 and 1 August 1947 by the Sasebo Ship Company.
