= Borneo Tarakan University =

- Type: Public
- Established: October 9, 1999
- Rector: Prof. Dr. Drs. Adri Patton, M.Si
- Location: Tarakan, Indonesia; 3.303139°N 117.648833°E
- Campus: Tarakan — Jalan Amal Lama no. 1
- Colors: Blue, green and white
- Website: https://www.ubt.ac.id/

Borneo Tarakan University is a public university located in Tarakan, North Kalimantan, Indonesia. The university was founded on October 9, 1999, as a private school and had its acknowledgement on March 30, 2000, by a decree issued by Pinekindi Foundation number 011/YP/TRK/III/2000.

== History ==
=== Founding and early history ===
Upon realizing that Tarakan is close to the Indonesian border with its two neighboring countries and surrounded by the rich soil and water of Borneo, the Pinekindi Foundation established Borneo Tarakan University on October 9, 1999.

== Campuses ==
Its main campus is located on Jalan Amal Lama, Tarakan.

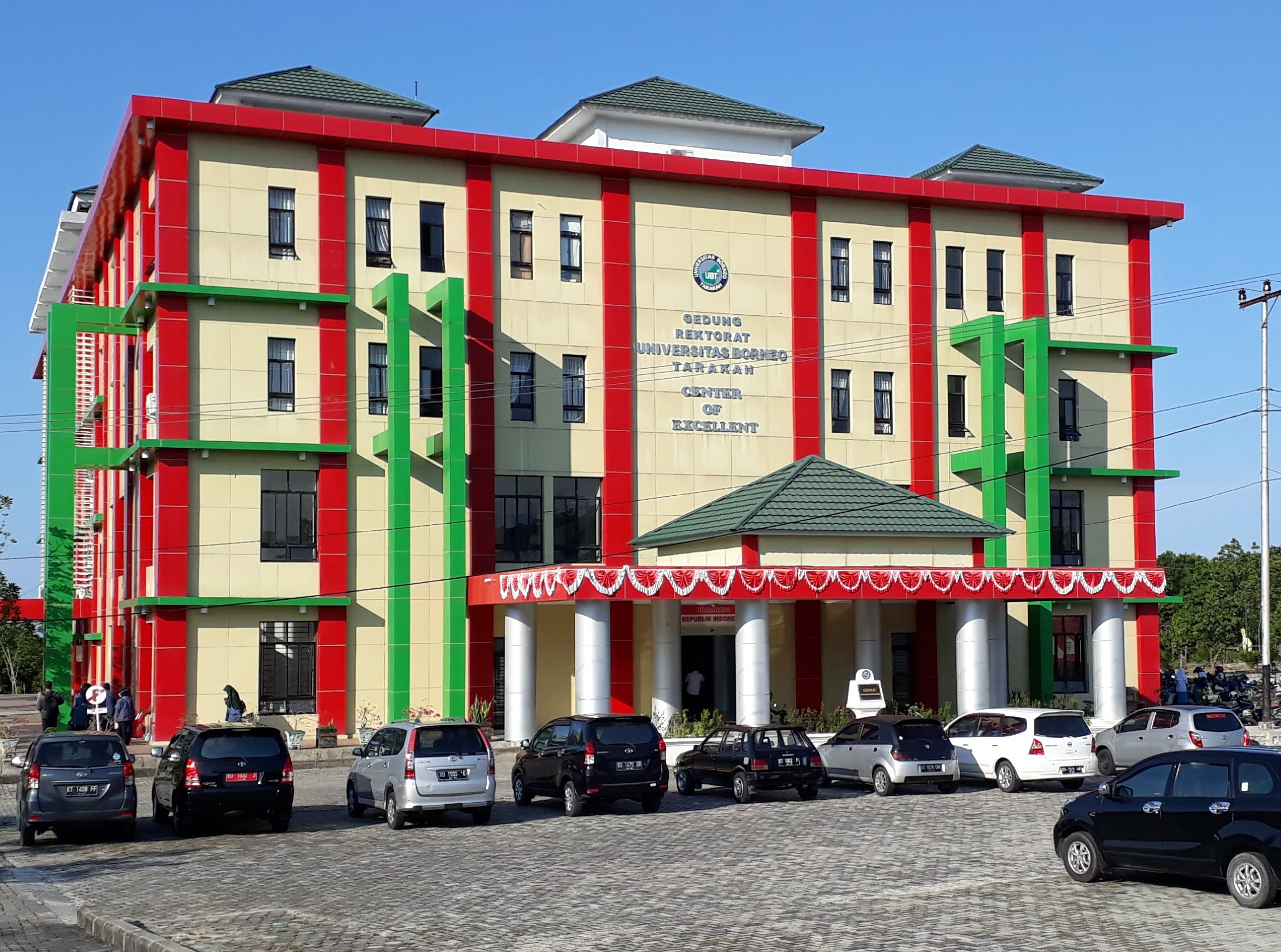
The UBT rectorate building
