= Ducol =

Type of high-strength, low-alloy steel

Ducol or "D"-steel is the name of a number of high-strength low-alloy steels of varying composition, first developed from the early 1920s by the Scottish firm of David Colville & Sons, Motherwell.

Applications have included warship hull construction and light armouring, road bridges, and pressure vessels including locomotive steam boilers and nuclear reactors.

== History ==
The original Ducol, or "D"-steel, is a manganese-silicon steel, a toughened version of the new, proven standard construction steels developed by David Colville & Sons just after WW1. (Note: Colville & Sons supplied, for example, the structural steel for the rebuilding of the Bank of England (1925-39).)

It was an improvement on British Admiralty "HT" (High Tensile) steel, a shipbuilding and light armour steel developed c1900 and used through the end of WWI. HT was a carbon steel with a small amount of nickel, which allowed it to be hardened to a greater level without cracking (i.e. increased "toughness"). Foreign similar steels – for example, German "Low-%" Nickel Steel and U.S. High Tensile Steel (HTS) – were more complex alloys using chromium, vanadium and molybdenum.

Up until about 1945, Ducol generally contained only manganese and silicon as alloying elements. More recent weldable grades (Ducol W21, W25, W30, and W30 grades A & B) include varying amounts of nickel, chromium, copper, molybdenum and vanadium.

== Composition ==
Composition of various Ducol-type steels
Grade	% C	% Mn	% Si	% P	% S	% Ni	% Cr	% Mo	% Cu	% V	Notes
Royal Navy "HT" steel	0.35~0.40	0.8~1.2	0.15								
§R. Sumida bridges	0.24~0.30	1.4~1.6									
IJN Ducol	0.25~0.30	1.20~1.60	?								
Ducol, RN "D"-steel	0.24~0.30	1.50	0.06~0.10	trace	trace						
§Chelsea Bridge	0.25	1.52	0.13	0.03	0.03				0.36		
Ducol W21	0.23	1.7				0.5 max	0.25 max				
Ducol W25	0.2 max	1.5 max				0.5 max	0.3 max	0.3 max			
Ducol W30	0.18 max	1.4 max				0.5 max	0.8 max	0.25 max	0.5 max	0.1 max	
Ducol W30; Grade A	0.11~0.17	1.0~1.5	0.4 max			0.7 max	0.4~0.7	0.2~0.28	0.3 max	0.04~0.12	
Ducol W30; Grade B	0.09~0.15	0.9~1.5	0.4 max			0.7~1.0	0.4~0.7	0.2~0.28	0.3 max	0.04~0.12	
§Sizewell 'A'	0.1	1.4	?			0.2	0.5	0.25		0.1	

== Weldability ==
Although modern grades of Ducol are termed 'weldable', this doesn't necessarily mean 'easily weldable'. A 1970 report on an explosion in a cylinder made of Ducol 30 found that in Ducol W30, embrittlement of the heat-affected zone (HAZ) occurs in welds unless post-weld heat treatment takes place at a sufficient temperature (675C).

In addition, the original product from the 1920s was also weldable (ie 'capable of being welded'), but with dubious results. The Imperial Japanese Navy built large warships using all-welded Ducol structural elements, which swiftly led to severe problems with the Mogami-class cruisers.

== Applications ==
=== Ships ===
Ducol has been used for bulkheads in both general construction and against torpedoes, and for light armour in warships of several countries, including the British, Japanese and perhaps Italian navies. After WW2 the highest grades of the commercial shipbuilding steels were based on this type of steel.

==== Royal Navy ====
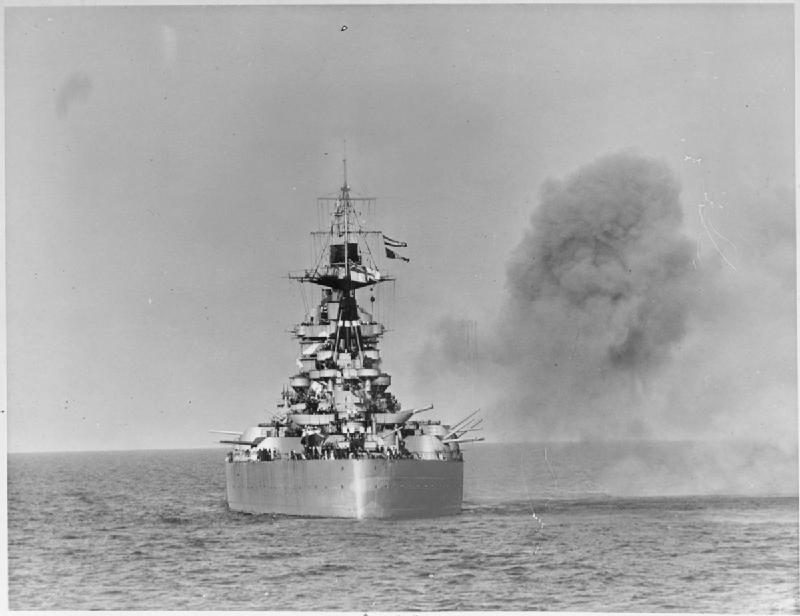
Rodney bombarding German positions along the Caen coast, 7 June 1944

Ducol steel was used in HMS Nelson and HMS Rodney (1927) to save weight.

It was used in British anti-torpedo-system design practice in its last battleships. The internal hull and torpedo bulkheads and internal decks were made of Ducol or "D"-class steel, an extra-strong form of HTS. Much of the load-bearing portions of King George V-class battleships including the weather deck and the bulkheads were made from Ducol

HMS Ark Royal's fully-enclosed armoured hangar and the armoured flight deck which it supported were constructed of Ducol.

It was used in the Town-class cruisers such as HMS Southampton: 1.25 inches (32 mm) to protect the upper and lower decks against plunging fire, and over the rudder head and steering gear; and 1 inch (25 mm) over the 'A' and 'Y' turret shell rooms.

Other types of armour used on Navy ships:

- HTS = High-tensile steel
- STS = Special treatment steel = homogenous armour

==== Imperial Japanese Navy ====
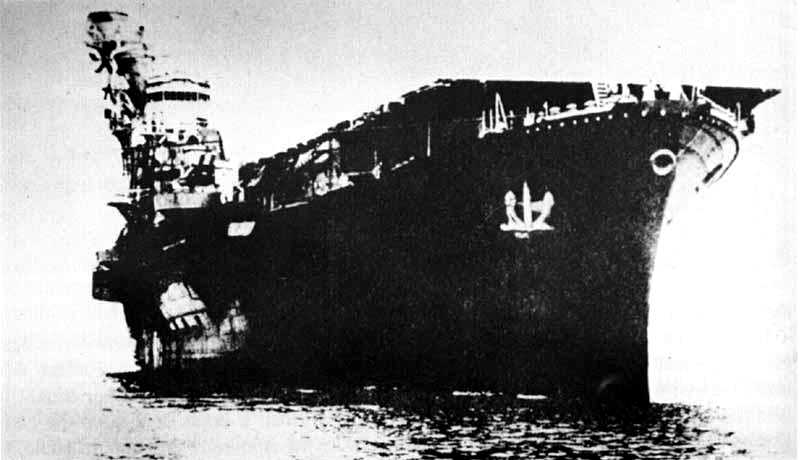
Hiyō at anchor

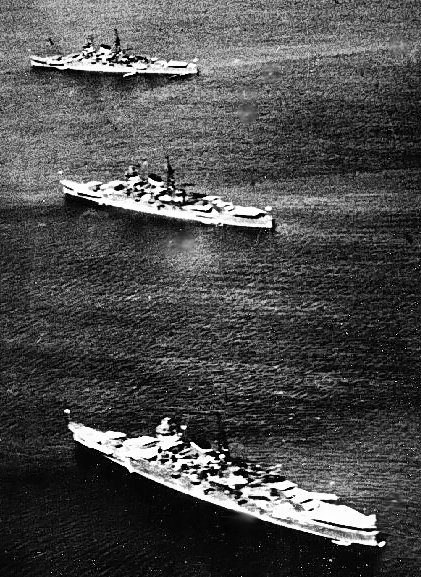
Three of the four Mogami-class cruisers of the Seventh Squadron

The Imperial Japanese Navy (IJN) made considerable use of Ducol made under licence by Japan Steel Works in Muroran, Hokkaidō, Japan: the company was set up with investment from Vickers, Armstrong Whitworth and Mitsui.

The Mogami-class cruisers were originally designed with all-welded Ducol bulkheads which were then welded to the ship's hull. The resultant faults caused by electric welding used in the structural portions of the hull resulted in deformation, and the main gun turrets were unable to train properly. They were re-built with riveted construction, and the other two were redesigned.

All of the following ships or classes (the list is not complete) used Ducol in structural bulkheads and protective plating:

1. Japanese aircraft carrier Kaga (1928)
2. Japanese cruiser Takao (Note: Japanese heavy cruiser Takao, along with Japanese battleship Nagato and the aircraft carrier Kaga and subsequent designs used torpedo bulges - inner curves formed by bulkheads made up of two 29mm plates providing 58mm of protetction. Also on Takao, Ducol was used on the conning tower (middle bridge deck). Torpedo warheads were also protected by a Ducol steel casing.)
3. Mogami-class cruisers (x2, 1931), (x2 1933-34)
4. Nagato-class battleships x2, (1920, upgraded 1934-36)
5. Japanese aircraft carrier Shōkaku (1939) (Note: "As already noted, in comparison with the preceding Hiryu, Shōkaku's armor protection was considerably improved. 25mm Ducol Steel (DS) steel plates protected her magazines and 132mm New Vickers non-cemented (NVNC) deck. Belt armor consisted of 16mm NVNC plates." Lengerer differs considerably as to what was made of Ducol, perhaps because of the extensive refit in 1934-36? "The lower strake of the armor was backed by 50 millimeters (2.0 in) of Ducol steel. The magazines were protected by 165 millimeters (6.5 in) of New Vickers Non-Cemented (NVNC) armor, sloped at an inclination up to 25° and tapered to thicknesses of 55–75 millimeters (2.2–3.0 in). The flight and both hangar decks were unprotected and the ships' propulsion machinery was protected by a 65-millimeter (2.6 in) deck of CNC armor. The Shōkakus were the first Japanese carriers to incorporate a torpedo belt system. The torpedo bulkhead itself consisted of an outer Ducol plate 18–30 millimeters (0.71–1.18 in) thick that was riveted to a 12-millimeter (0.47 in) plate.")
6. Japanese battleship Yamato (1940) (Note: The main portion of the central longitudinal structure was made with Ducol - rivetted, not welded, after problems with the Mogami-class cruisers. Also given 9mm deck plating.)
7. Japanese battleship Musashi (1940)
8. Japanese aircraft carrier Hiyō (1941)
9. Japanese cruiser Oyodo (1941)
10. Agano-class cruisers x4, (1941–44)
11. Japanese aircraft carrier Shinano (1944)

In addition, the IJN's '25-ton' type river motor gun boat had an all-welded hull, protected by 4-5mm Ducol steel.

==== Italian Navy ====
The Italian Navy used a similar type of steel to Ducol in its Pugliese torpedo defense system. This underwater "bulge" system was introduced in the Italian Littorio-class battleships, and in the completely rebuilt versions of the Italian battleship Duilio and the Conte di Cavour-class battleships. The inboard-facing side consisted of a layer of silicon-manganese high-tensile steel from 28-40mm thick called "Elevata Resistenza" (ER) steel, which was probably somewhat similar to the British Ducol ("D" or "Dl") Steel used for light armour and torpedo bulkheads in WWII.

"However, the power of the torpedoes used during WWII rapidly outclassed even the best bulge protection systems and the magnetic pistol, when finally perfected, allowed the torpedo to completely bypass the bulge by detonating under the keel of the ship."

=== Tanks ===
During WWII many Soviet tanks used Ducol type steel due to a lack of chromium and nickel.

=== Bridges ===
==== Sumida River ====
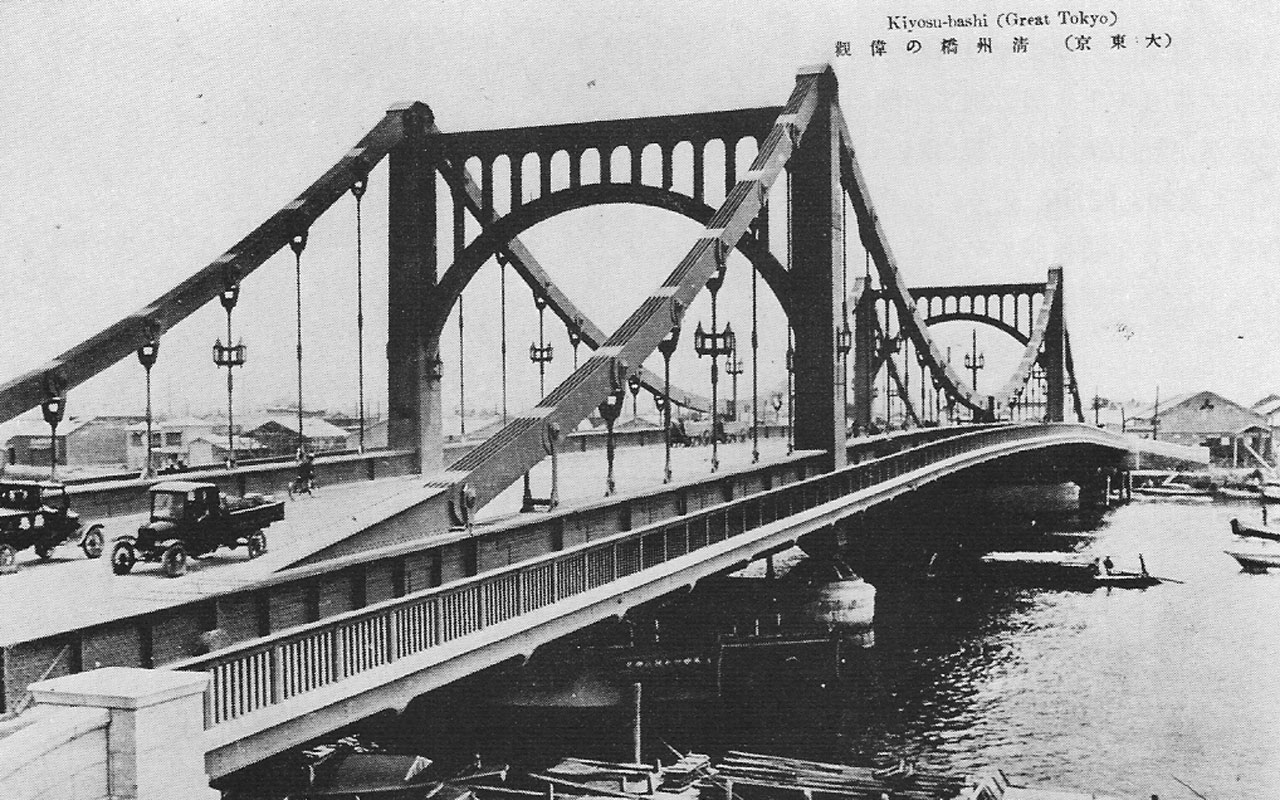
Kiyosu-bashi suspension bridge

The Eitai-bashi (1926) and Kiyosu-bashi (1928) bridges over the Sumida River in Tokyo seem to have been some of the first bridges to be made with Ducol, at the time a state-of-the-art technology.

The bridges were built by Kawasaki Dockyard Co., to replace earlier crossings which were destroyed in the 1923 Great Kanto earthquake. High-tensile Ducol was used for the lower supports of the Eitai-bashi tied-arch bridge, and for the upper cables of the Kiyosu-bashi self-anchored suspension bridge. The steel was made at Kawasaki's Hyogo Works, Kobe.

"The Ducol steel was used as the material in cases of the construction of the Eitai bashi and the Kiyosu bashi. The author is not aware if the material has been previously used for a bridge.
The material investigated by the author has the C content of 0.24-0.30% and Mn of 1.4-1.6% giving a tensile strength 63-71kg/mm2, elongation 20-23% in 200mm gauge and elastic limit 42kg/mm2.
The Ducol steel seems to be preferable as the bridge building material both in quality and in the cost compared with others such as Ni steel, Si steel and C steel."

==== Chelsea Bridge ====
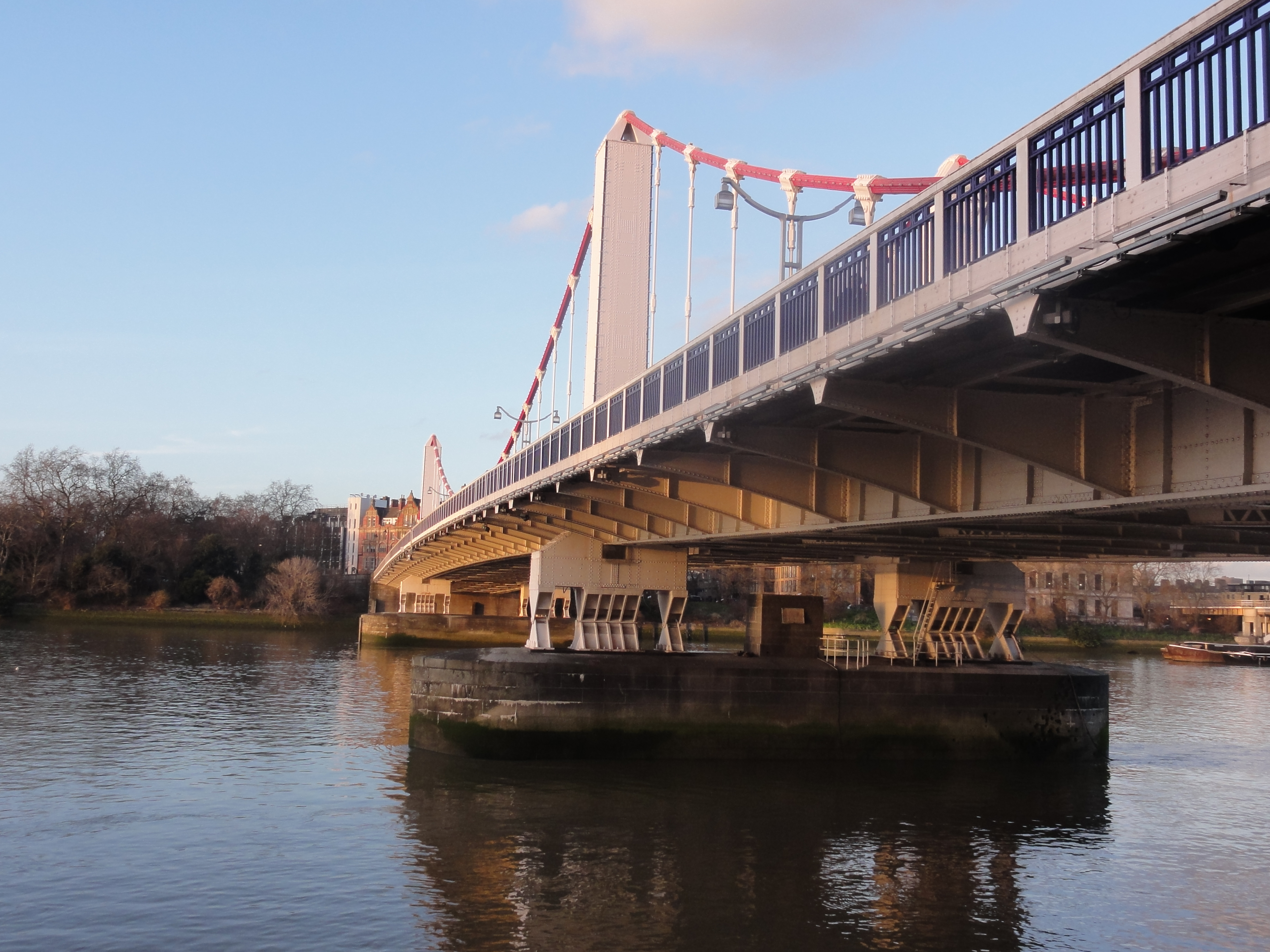
Chelsea Bridge from below

Ducol was also used in the construction of the stiffening girders of Chelsea Bridge (1934-1937) joined by HTS rivets. A small amount of copper was added to the mix to improve corrosion resistance.

==== Glen Quoich Road Bridge ====
Used in the construction of the Glen Quoich Road Bridge, Aberdeenshire - built 1955 by Sir William Arrol & Co. crossing the Qoich Water between Mar Lodge and Allanaquoich, not far from where it joins the River Dee.

=== Pressure vessels ===
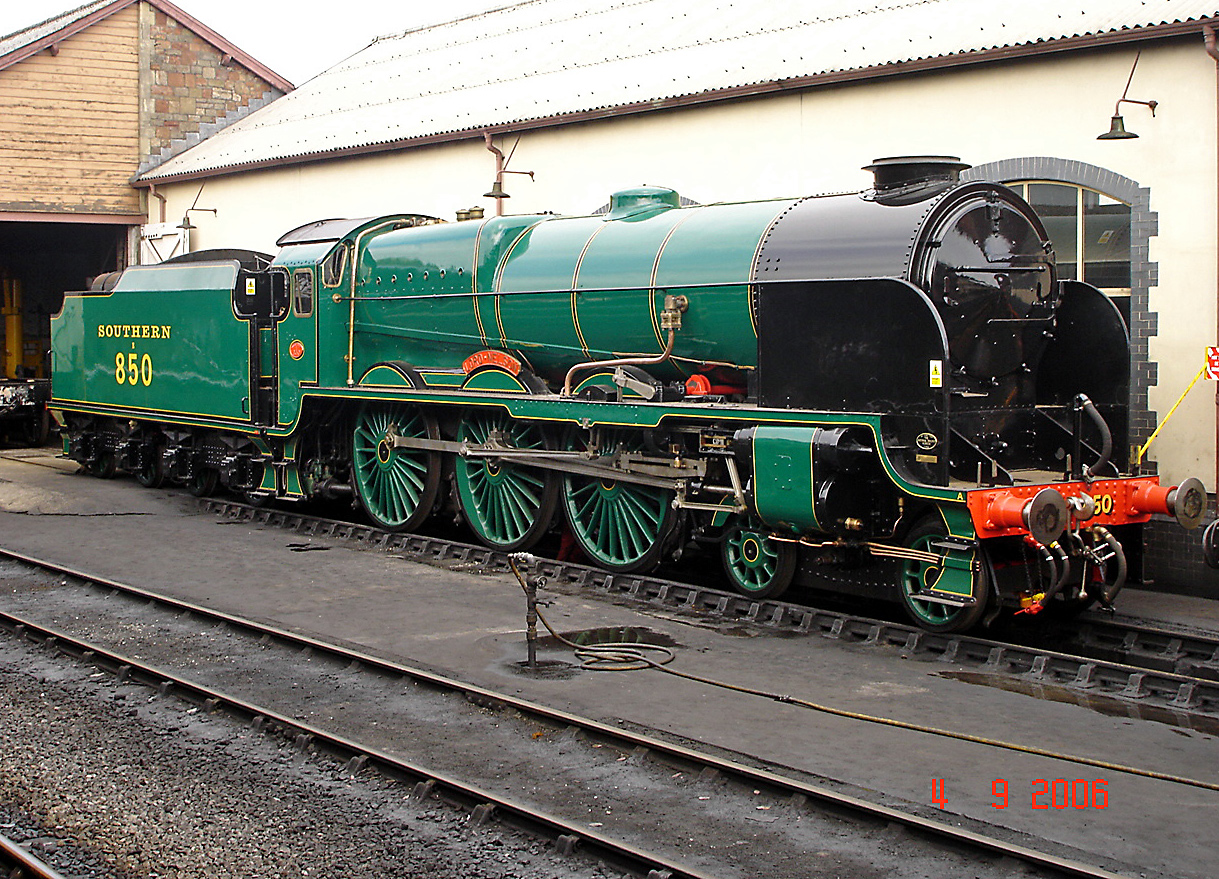
SR 850 Lord Nelson, restored

Ducol has been used in pressure vessels including steam boilers and solid wall ammonia converter shells as used in the Haber–Bosch process. Normalised and tempered Ducol W30 has been used in heavy walled nuclear reactors.

In the UK, the British Standard for low alloy steels used for high temperature pressure purposes is BS EN 10028-2:2006. It replaced the old BS1501 Part 2: 1988.

==== Steam locomotives ====
The boiler plates for the Southern Railway 4-6-0 Lord Nelson class locomotives, designed by Richard Maunsell in 1926 to work at 250 psi (1,700 kPa), were made of Ducol.

== Incidents ==
A number of pressure vessels & boilers constructed with Ducol (or similar materials) have failed. Such failures have all been because of faulty fabrication or testing of the vessel, rather than the steel itself.

=== Sizewell 'A' ===
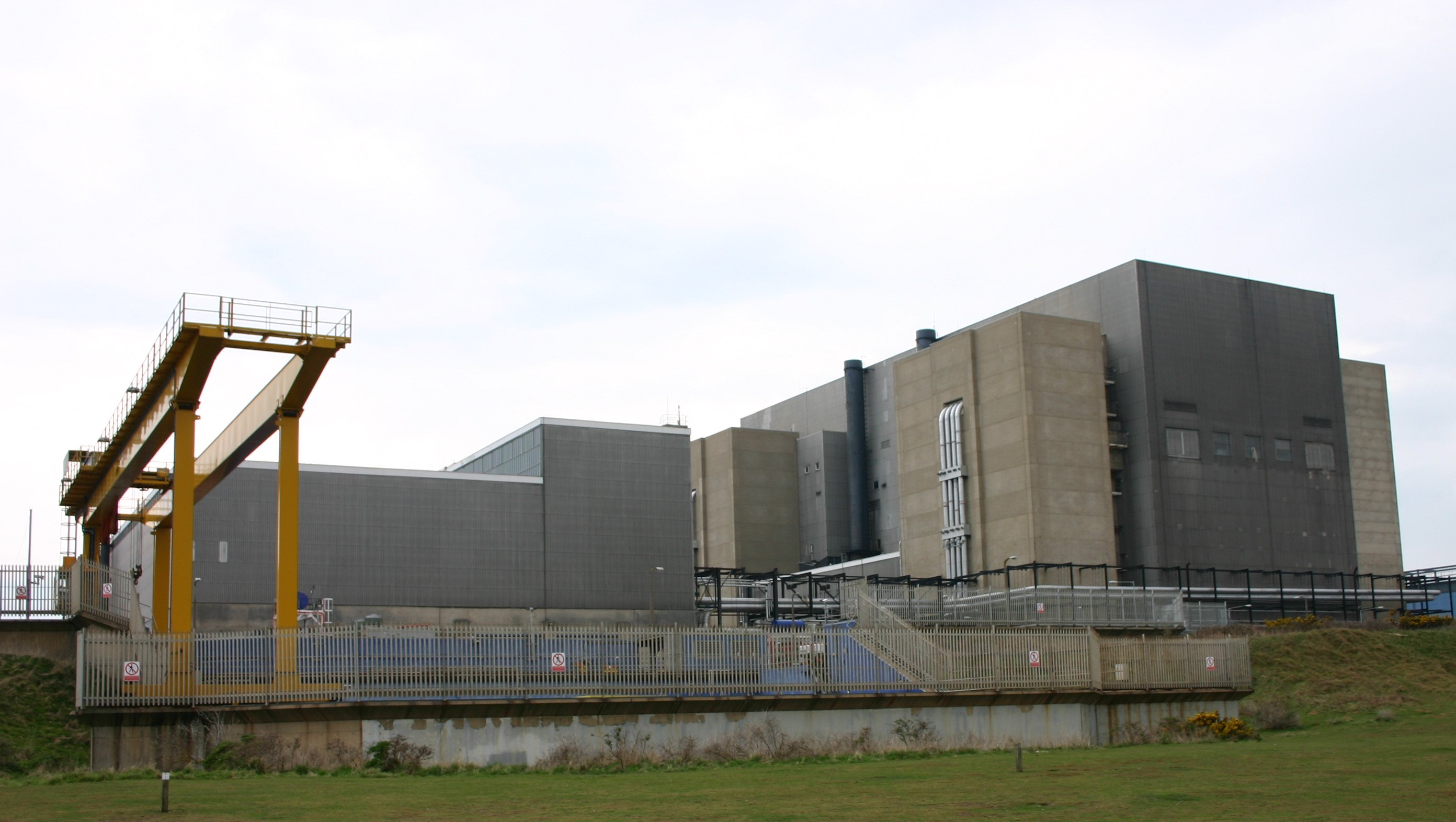
Sizewell 'A' nuclear power station

Ducol was used in the boiler shells at Sizewell ‘A’ nuclear reactor.

Failure of Sizewell ‘A’ boiler under hydrostatic test, May 1963. "The boiler was 18.9 m long, 6.9 m diameter, and was fabricated from plates 57 mm thick in a low alloy steel, conforming to BW87A specification (similar to Ducol W30, but with lower C), of composition 0.1C, 1.4Mn, 0.5Cr, 0.25Mo, 0.2Ni, 0.1 V. The cause of the failure was attributed to a shock impact loading, when the wooden chocks on which the vessel was resting during the hydro-test suddenly gave way."

Ducol would have been used for the later stations, but was superseded by prestressed concrete pressure vessels (PCPV). The advantage of prestressed concrete is that once the initial compression has been applied, the resulting material has the characteristics of high-strength concrete when subject to any subsequent compression forces, and of ductile high-strength steel when subject to tension forces.

=== John Thompson pressure vessel ===
In December 1965 a boiler made of Ducol was under construction by John Thompson, Wolverhampton, for ICI's ammonia plant at Fisons' Immingham works. It was being pressure-tested after heat treatment when it exploded, throwing one chunk weighing 2 tons right through the workshop wall and landing 50 metres away.

In Ducol W30, embrittlement of the heat-affected zone (HAZ) in welds occurs unless post-weld heat treatment takes place at a sufficient temperature (675C). The amount of pre-heating and the type of welding consumables (eg low hydrogen) can affect hydrogen embrittlement (or cracking) in the weld.

=== Cockenzie power station ===
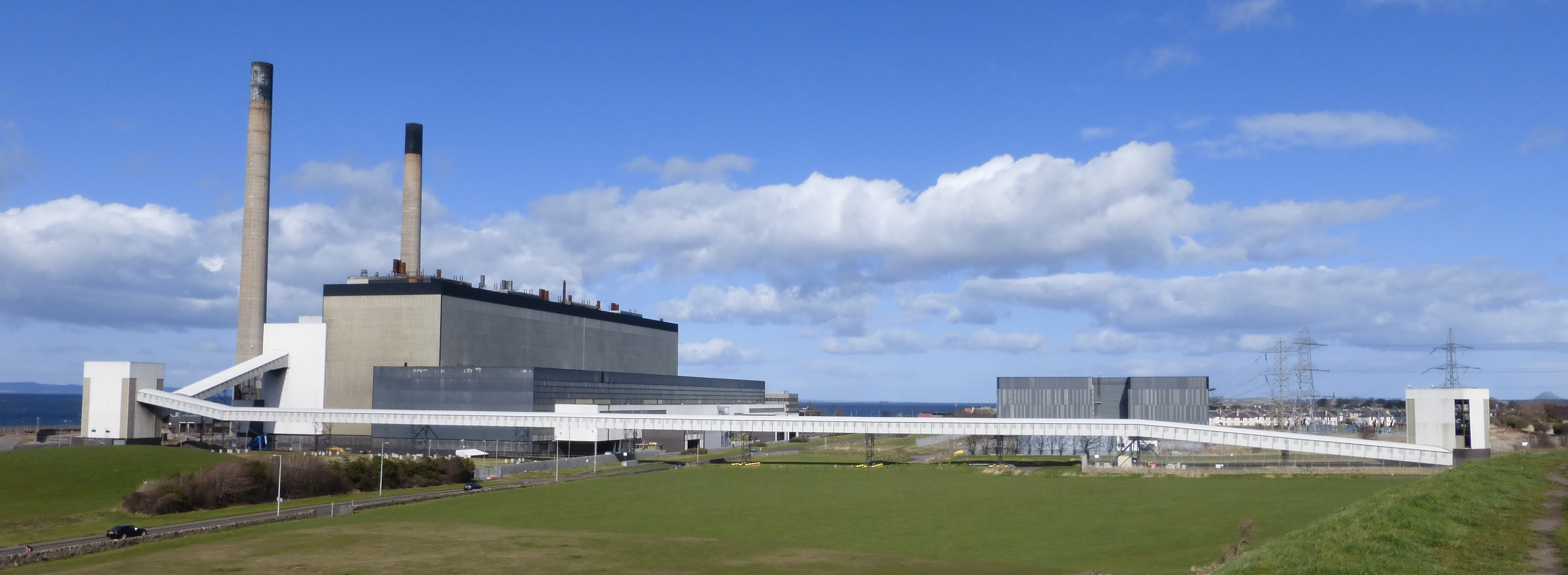
Cockenzie Power Station

A boiler drum made with Ducol plates, manufactured by Babcock & Wilcox Ltd (now Altrad Babcock) at Renfrew, near Glasgow, to BS 1113 (1958) was installed at Cockenzie Power Station in East Lothian, Scotland. It exploded on 6 May 1967 under repeated pressure testing. According to Jim Thomson, the failure was caused by a crack (created during the original manufacturing process) which occurred next to an economiser nozzle replaced during testing; the crack had penetrated part-way through the thick wall of the pressure vessel.

== See also ==
- List of named alloys
