= Japanese aircraft carrier Hiyō =

Hiyō-class aircraft carrier

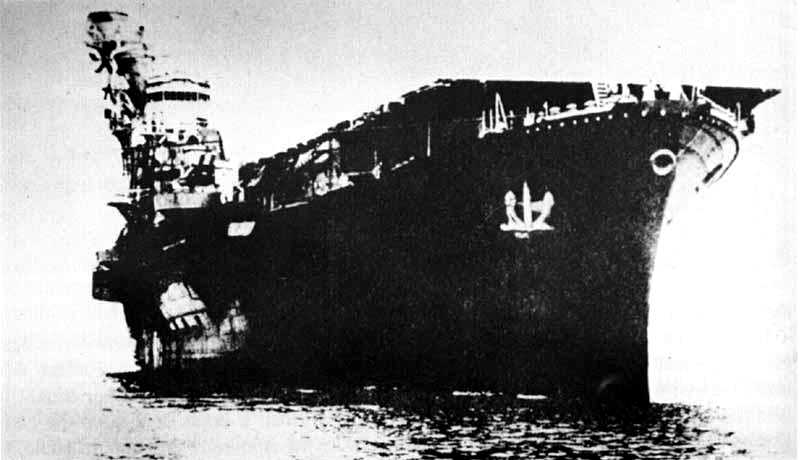
- Hiyō at anchor

History

Empire of Japan
- Name: Izumo Maru
- Owner: Nippon Yusen Kaisha (Japan Mail Steamship Company)
- Ordered: Late 1938
- Builder: Kawasaki Heavy Industries, Kobe
- Laid down: 30 November 1939
- Fate: Sold to Imperial Japanese Navy, 10 February 1941
- Name: Hiyō
- Namesake: Flying Hawk
- Launched: 24 June 1941
- Acquired: 10 February 1941
- Commissioned: 31 July 1942
- Stricken: 10 November 1944
- Fate: Sunk during the Battle of the Philippine Sea, 20 June 1944

General characteristics (as built)
- Class & type: Hiyō-class aircraft carrier
- Displacement: 24,150 t (23,770 long tons) (standard)
- Length: 220 m (721 ft 9 in) (o/a)
- Beam: 26.7 m (87 ft 7 in)
- Draught: 8.15 m (26 ft 9 in)
- Installed power: 6 water-tube boilers; 56,250 shp (41,950 kW)
- Propulsion: 2 shafts; 2 geared steam turbines
- Speed: 25.5 knots (47.2 km/h; 29.3 mph)
- Range: 11,700 nmi (21,700 km; 13,500 mi) at 18 knots (33 km/h; 21 mph)
- Complement: 1,187–1,224
- Sensors & processing systems: 1 × Type 2, Mark 2, Model 1 early-warning radar
- Armament: 6 × twin 12.7 cm (5 in) DP guns; 8 × triple 2.5 cm (1 in) AA guns
- Armour: Belt: 50 mm (2 in)
- Aircraft carried: 53

Hiyō (Japanese: 飛鷹; "Flying Hawk") was the name ship of her class of two aircraft carriers of the Imperial Japanese Navy (IJN). Originally planned as the ocean liner Izumo Maru (出雲丸) in 1939, she was purchased by the Navy Ministry in 1941 for conversion to an aircraft carrier. Completed shortly after the Battle of Midway in June 1942, she participated in the Guadalcanal campaign, but missed the Battle of the Santa Cruz Islands in October because of an electrical generator fire.

The carrier's aircraft were disembarked several times and used from land bases in battles in the South West Pacific. Hiyō was torpedoed in mid-1943 and spent three months under repair. She spent most of the next six months training and ferrying aircraft before returning to combat. She was sunk by a gasoline-vapour explosion caused by an American torpedo hit during the Battle of the Philippine Sea on 20 June 1944 with the loss of 247 officers and ratings, about a fifth of her complement.

== Design and description ==
The ship was ordered as the fast luxury passenger liner Izumo Maru by Nippon Yusen Kaisha (Japan Mail Steamship Company) in late 1938. In exchange for a Navy Ministry subsidy of 60% of her building costs, she was designed to be converted to an aircraft carrier in the event of war. The designs of Izumo Maru and her sister ship Kashiwara Maru were based on the German ocean liner SS Bremen, although they were only about half that ship's size at 27,700 gross register tons (GRT). If completed as designed, they would have been the largest ocean liners in Japan. The ships were designed to carry a total of 890 passengers; 220 first class, 120 second class and 550 third class.

After her conversion, Hiyō had a length of 220 metres (721 ft 9 in) overall. She had a beam of 26.7 metres (87 ft 7 in) and a draught of 8.15 metres (26 ft 9 in). She displaced 24,150 tonnes (23,770 long tons) at standard load. Her crew ranged from 1,187 to 1,224 officers and ratings.

The ship was fitted with a pair of Mitsubishi-Curtis geared steam turbine sets with a total of 56,250 shaft horsepower (41,950 kW), each driving one propeller, using steam provided by six Kawasaki-LaMont boilers. Hiyō had a designed speed of 25.5 knots (47.2 km/h; 29.3 mph) and slightly exceeded that during sea trials. The ship carried enough fuel oil to give her a range of 11,700 nautical miles (21,700 km; 13,500 mi) at 18 knots (33 km/h; 21 mph).

=== Flight deck arrangements ===
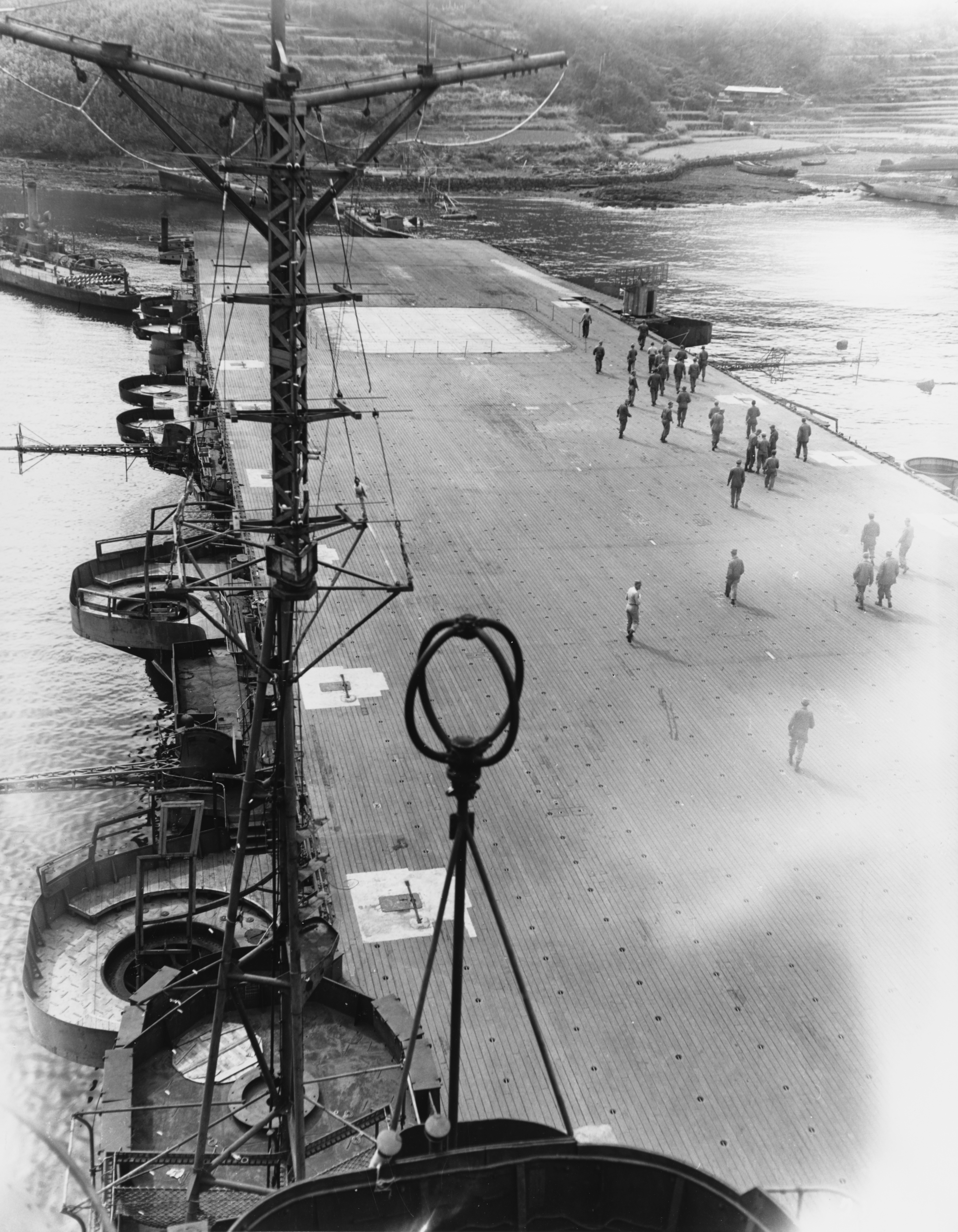
Aft view of the flight deck of her sister ship Jun'yō from the island, 19 October 1945

Hiyō's flight deck was 210.3 metres (690 ft) long and had a maximum width of 27.3 metres (89 ft 7 in). The ship was designed with two superimposed hangars, each approximately 153 metres (502 ft) long, 15 metres (49 ft) wide and 5 metres (16 ft) high. Each hangar could be subdivided by four fire curtains and they had fire fighting foam dispensers on each side. The hangars were served by two aircraft lifts.

Her air group was initially intended to consist of 12 Mitsubishi A5M "Claude" fighters, plus four in storage, 18 Aichi D3A "Val" dive bombers, plus two in storage, and 18 Nakajima B5N "Kate" torpedo bombers. This was revised to substitute a dozen Mitsubishi A6M Zero fighters and three in storage for the A5Ms by the time the ship was commissioned in 1942. As a result of the lessons learnt from the Battle of Midway in June, the fighter complement was increased to 21 Zeros and the B5Ns were reduced to 9. By the end of the year, 6 more Zeros replaced an equal number of D3As, giving totals of 27 A6Ms, 12 D3As and 9 B5Ns. Although it was possible to fit all these aircraft into the hangars, 8 or 9 were usually stored on the flight deck to reduce congestion below decks.

=== Armour, armament and sensors ===
As a conversion from an ocean liner, it was not possible to add much armour, although the ship had a double hull. Two plates of Ducol steel, each 25 millimetres (1 in) thick, protected the sides of the ship's machinery spaces. The ship's aviation gasoline tanks and magazines were protected by one layer of Ducol steel. Her machinery spaces were further subdivided by transverse and longitudinal bulkheads to limit any flooding.

The ship's primary armament consisted of a dozen 12.7-centimetre (5 in) Type 89 dual-purpose guns in twin mounts on sponsons along the sides of the hull. Hiyō was also initially equipped with eight triple mounts for 2.5 cm Type 96 light AA guns alongside the flight deck. This was the standard Japanese light AA gun during World War II, but it suffered from severe design shortcomings which rendered it a largely ineffective weapon. According to historian Mark Stille, the twin and triple mounts "lacked sufficient speed in train or elevation; the gun sights were unable to handle fast targets; the gun exhibited excessive vibration; the magazine was too small, and, finally, the gun produced excessive muzzle blast". In early 1943, four more triple mounts were added, and another four triple mounts were added late in the year. Two of these last four mounts were mounted on the stern and the others were placed in front of and behind the island. A dozen single mounts were also added, some of which were portable and could be mounted on tie-down points on the flight deck.

Two Type 94 high-angle fire-control directors, one on each side of the ship, were fitted to control the Type 89 guns. Four Type 95 directors controlled the 2.5 cm guns, and another pair were added in early 1943. Early warning was provided by two Type 2, Mark 2, Model 1 early-warning radars. The first of these was mounted on the top of the island shortly before she was completed in July 1942 and the other was added later in the year. This latter system was fitted on the port side of the hull, outboard of the aft lift. A smaller Type 3, Mark 1, Model 3 early-warning radar was added in 1944.

== Construction and career ==
Hiyō was laid down on 30 November 1939 by Kawasaki on Slipway No. 4 at their shipyard in Kobe. She was yard number 660 and had the name Izumo Maru. The ship was purchased on 10 February 1941 by the Navy Ministry, and she was temporarily referred to as No. 1002 Ship (Dai 1002 bankan) to keep her conversion secret. She was launched on 24 June 1941 and commissioned on 31 July 1942 with Captain Akitomo Beppu in command.

The ship was assigned to the Second Carrier Division of the 1st Air Fleet after commissioning and became flagship of Rear Admiral Kakuji Kakuta on 12 August. After spending the next few months working up, Hiyō arrived at Truk, together with her sister Jun'yō, on 9 October, to begin operations against American forces in the Guadalcanal area as part of the 3rd Fleet. On the night of 16 October, the two carriers were ordered to attack the American transports off Lunga Point, Guadalcanal, and they moved south to their launching point 180 nautical miles (330 km; 210 mi) north of Lunga. At 05:15 local each ship launched nine A6M Zeros and nine B5Ns. One of Jun'yō's B5Ns was forced to turn back with mechanical problems; the rest reached their objective and discovered two destroyers bombarding Japanese supply dumps on Guadalcanal around 07:20. Hiyō's aircraft attacked USS Aaron Ward seven minutes later without effect, and the American ship shot down one B5N and damaged another which was forced to make a crash landing. Jun'yō's eight B5Ns engaged USS Lardner and also failed to hit their target, not least because they were attacked by Marine Grumman F4F Wildcat fighters at 07:32. The Marine pilots shot down three B5Ns on their first pass and severely damaged another pair which were also forced to crash-land. The US fighters then shot down the three remaining bombers after they missed Lardner. The defending Zeros were able to shoot down only one Wildcat at the cost of one of Hiyō's fighters forced to crash land, although they claimed to have shot down thirteen Marine fighters.

A fire in the ship's generator room occurred on 21 October and reduced her top speed to 16 knots (30 km/h; 18 mph), so Kakuta transferred his flag to Jun'yō while Hiyō returned to Truk for repairs. Three Zeros, one D3A and five B5Ns were also transferred to Jun'yō before she left. The remaining aircraft of her air group (16 Zeros and 17 D3As) were flown off for Rabaul, on the island of New Britain, on 23 October, from where the fighters escorted bombers attacking Guadalcanal the following day. A detachment from the air group was transferred to Buin, New Guinea, on 1 November and attacked American ships off Lunga Point on 11 November. Escorted by 18 Zeros from Hiyō and the 204th Naval Air Group, 9 D3As slightly damaged three cargo ships in exchange for 4 dive bombers shot down and another forced to crash land. The Zeros were able to ambush six Wildcats in the heavy cloud and shot down four while losing two of their own. That same day, those aircraft that remained at Rabaul flew back to Truk, but the Buin detachment remained there until 14 December when they were ferried back to Japan. Captain Michio Sumikawa relieved Beppu on 30 November.

Hiyō spent November in Truk before returning in early December to Japan, where she was rejoined by the rest of her air group. Aside from a brief refit at Kure from 26 February to 4 March 1943 that saw her anti-aircraft armament augmented and an additional radar installed, the ship was training in the Inland Sea until she sailed for Truk on 22 March. Her air group consisted of 27 Zeros and 12 D3As, and they were detached from Hiyō in early April to participate in Operation I-Go, a land-based aerial offensive against Allied bases in the Solomon Islands and New Guinea. On 7 April her aircraft formed most of the third wave of attacks on Guadalcanal. Escorted by 24 Zeros from Hiyō and another 6 from the light carrier Zuihō, the D3As attacked shipping in the Sealark Channel. The escorts claimed to have shot down three American aircraft for the loss of one Zero and three dive bombers. Allied naval losses during the entire day included Aaron Ward, the oil tanker Kanawha, the minesweeper HMNZS Moa and damage to a transport and another tanker, although it is uncertain which aircraft sank or damaged each ship.

A second series of attacks was made against Oro Bay, New Guinea, on 11 April. Jun'yō's 9 Zeros, together with Hiyō's 21 fighters, escorted the latter's D3As. One defending fighter was claimed for the loss of a single dive bomber. The following day, 17 of Hiyō's Zeros provided top cover for several waves of attacks on Port Moresby, New Guinea, her pilots claiming nine victories without losing any of their own. On 14 April, the Japanese attacked Milne Bay, New Guinea, with a large force escorted by 75 Zeros contributed by all the carriers involved. Hiyō's fighter pilots claimed to have shot down three Allied aircraft without loss, and the bombers sank two transports. Her air group returned to Truk by 18 April to rejoin the ship.

In response to the invasion of Attu Island on 11 May, the Second Carrier Division departed Truk, accompanied by three battleships and two heavy cruisers, and reached Japan on 25 May. The Americans recaptured Attu before the fleet could depart to counter-attack. Now the flagship of the Second Carrier Division under Rear Admiral Munetaka Sakamaki, Hiyō departed Yokosuka on 7 June with Junyō en route for Truk. Later that evening, the ship was torpedoed by the submarine USS Trigger off Miyakejima. Hits in the starboard bow and boiler room knocked out all power but she managed to return to Japan the following day after restoring power. Hiyō's fighters were flown to Truk by 15 July and assigned to the light carrier Ryūhō, as were Sakamaki and his staff. While being repaired at Yokosuka until 15 September, more 2.5 cm Type 96 AA guns were installed, and Sumikawa was relieved by Captain Tamotsu Furukawa on 1 September. Two months later, Hiyō's air group was reconstituted in Singapore with 24 Zeros, 18 D3As and 9 B5Ns; the ship departed Japan for Singapore on 24 November. She arrived on 3 December, loaded her air group and was almost immediately assigned duties as an aircraft ferry. On 9 December, Hiyō left Singapore en route for Truk with several deliveries on the way. The ship arrived there on 22 December and disembarked her aircraft before proceeding to Saipan to deliver more aircraft. The air group was transferred to Kavieng and later Rabaul to provide air cover for Japanese operations there, in which the fighters claimed 80 victories in exchange for 12 losses.

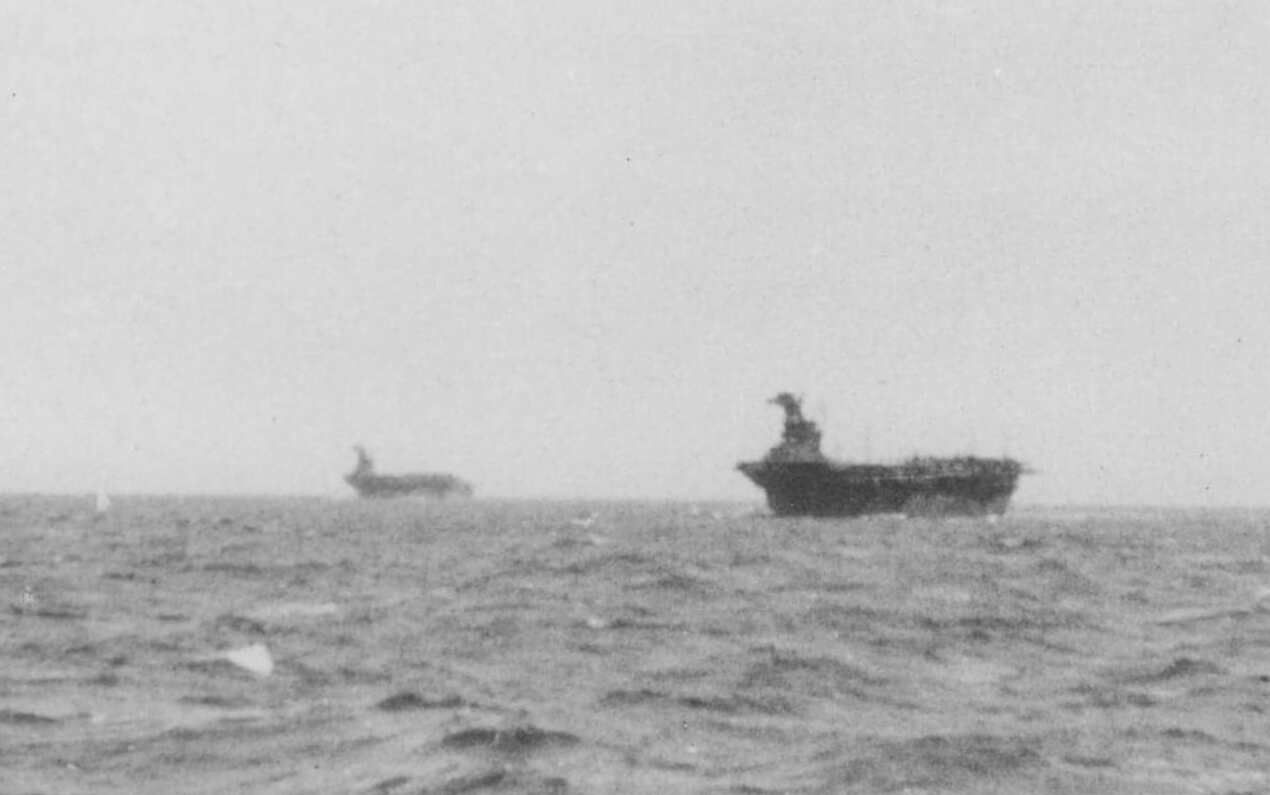
Hiyō and Jun'yō sailing to Tawi-Tawi, 13 May 1944

Hiyō returned to Japan on 1 January 1944, and Furukawa was relieved by Captain Toshiyuki Yokoi on 15 February. Her air group was reassigned to her on 2 March, albeit without aircraft. The Japanese Navy had restructured its carrier air groups so that one air group was assigned to one carrier division and the 652nd Naval Air Group was assigned to the Second Carrier Division with Hiyō, Jun'yō and Ryūhō. The air group was the last to be rebuilt; it had only 30 Model 21 Zeros, 13 Model 52 Zeros and four D3As on hand on 1 April of its authorised 81 fighters, 36 dive bombers and 27 torpedo bombers. The ship conducted training for her aircraft in the Inland Sea until 11 May when she sailed for Tawi-Tawi in the Philippines. The new base was closer to the oil wells in Borneo on which the Navy relied for fuel and also to the Palau and western Caroline Islands, where the Japanese expected the next American attack. The location lacked an airfield on which to train the green pilots, and American submarines were very active in the vicinity which restricted the ships to the anchorage.

=== Battle of the Philippine Sea ===
The Japanese fleet was en route to Guimaras Island in the central Philippines on 13 June 1944 where it intended to practice carrier operations in an area better protected from submarines, when Vice-Admiral Jisaburō Ozawa learnt of the American attack on the Mariana Islands the previous day. Upon reaching Guimaras, the fleet refuelled and sortied into the Philippine Sea where it spotted Task Force 58 on 18 June. The Americans failed to detect the Japanese ships that day. Ozawa decided to launch his air strikes early the following morning, so the Japanese turned south to maintain a constant distance between them and the American carriers. The 652nd Naval Air Group had 81 Zeros, 27 D3As, 9 Yokosuka D4Y "Judy" dive bombers and 18 Nakajima B6N "Jill" torpedo bombers, roughly evenly divided among the three carriers under his command. The carriers began launching their first air strike of 26 bomb-carrying A6M2 Zeros, 7 B6Ns and 16 A6M5 Zeros as escorts around 09:30. Most of these aircraft were misdirected and failed to find any American ships, although a dozen persisted in their search and found one of the American task groups. A B6N, 5 bomb-carrying Zeros and an escort Zero were shot down by the defending fighters, and no damage was inflicted on the American ships.

A second air strike of 27 D3As, 9 D4Ys, 2 B6Ns and 26 escorting Zeros was launched around 11:00, accompanied by at least 18 A6Ms and B6Ns from the carriers Shōkaku and Zuikaku. They had also been given an erroneous spot report and were unable to find any American ships. Some of the aircraft headed for airfields at Rota and Guam to refuel while the remainder headed back to the carriers. A pair of Zeros and six D4Ys bound for Rota spotted the carriers Wasp and Bunker Hill en route, but failed to inflict any damage on them while losing five D4Ys to anti-aircraft fire. Radar had spotted those aircraft headed for Guam, and they were intercepted by 41 Grumman F6F Hellcats. Only an A6M5, a D4Y and seven D3As of the 49 Japanese aircraft survived the encounter and landed.

At dusk, the Japanese turned away to the north west to regroup and to refuel, and the Americans turned west to close the distance. They discovered the retiring Japanese fleet during the afternoon of the following day, and Vice-Admiral Marc Mitscher ordered an air strike. Hiyō was struck by two bombs, one of which detonated above the bridge and killed or wounded virtually everyone there. More seriously, the ship was struck by one torpedo dropped by a Grumman TBF Avenger from the light carrier Belleau Wood. The torpedo knocked out the starboard engine room and started fires but Hiyō was able to continue, at reduced speed. Two hours later, a large explosion occurred when leaking gasoline vapour ignited and knocked out all power on the ship. The fires raged out of control and Hiyō sank stern first shortly afterwards at 16°20′N 132°32′E. Roughly 1,200 men were rescued by her escorting destroyers, but 247 officers and ratings died aboard the carrier.
