= Juvai Semaring Airport =

Juvai Semaring Airport Bandar Udara Juvai Semaring
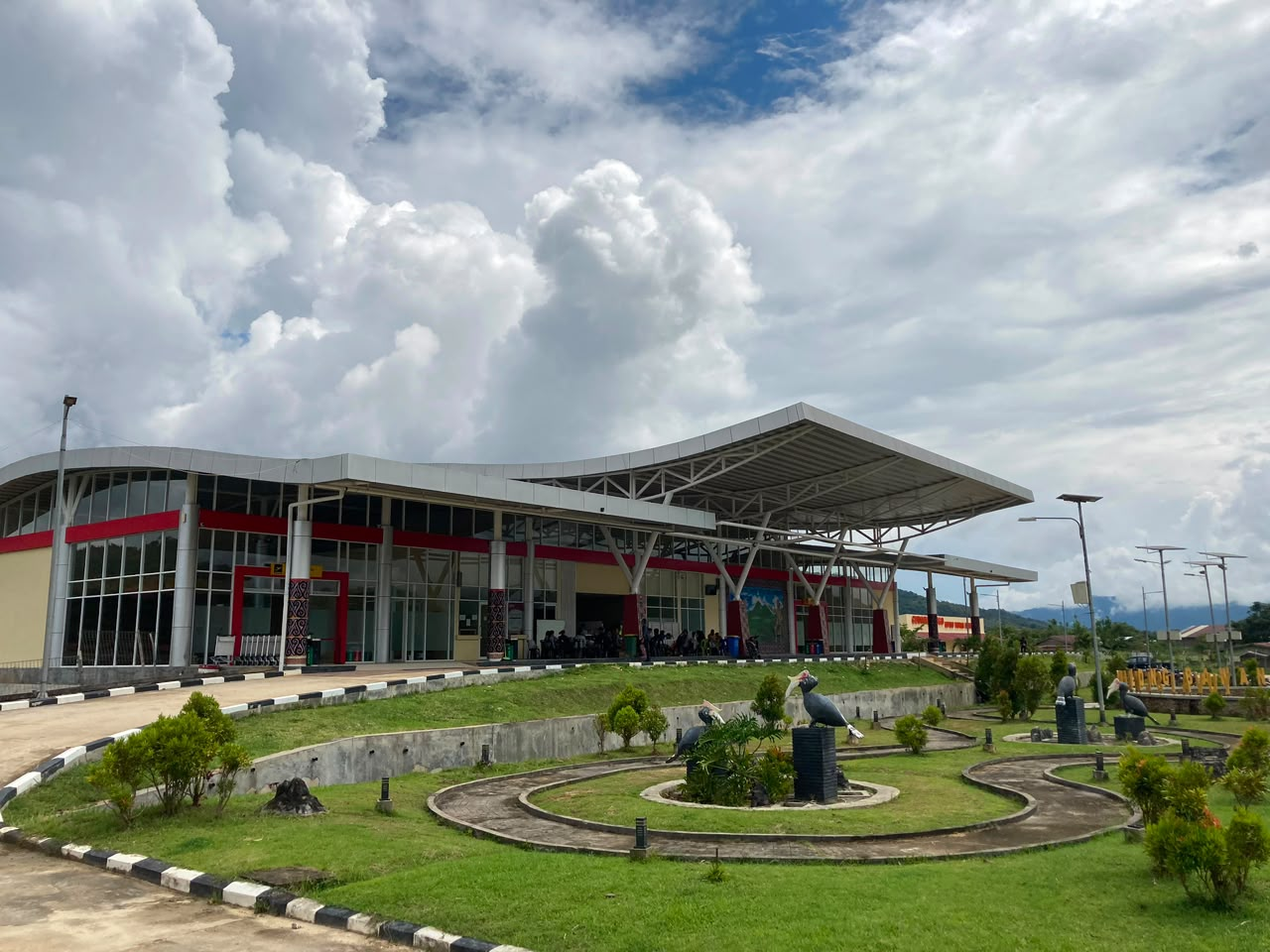
- IATA: LBW; ICAO: WAQJ

Summary
- Airport type: Public
- Owner: Government of Indonesia
- Operator: Directorate General of Civil Aviation
- Serves: Long Bawan
- Location: Long Bawan, Krayan, Nunukan Regency, North Kalimantan, Indonesia
- Time zone: WITA (UTC+08:00)
- Elevation AMSL: 762 m (2,500 ft)
- Coordinates: 03°54′11.2″N 115°41′31.2″E

Map
- Location in Kalimantan

Runways
Direction	Length		Surface
Direction	m	ft	Surface
04/22	1,600	5,249	Asphalt

Statistics (2024)
- Passengers: 33,583 (▲207.3%)
- Cargo (tonnes): 1,639.46 (▲6.0%)
- Aircraft movements: 7,894 (▲208.4%)
- Source: DGCA

Juvai Semaring Airport or Yuvai Semaring Airport (IATA: LBW, ICAO: WAQJ), formerly Long Bawan Airport, is a domestic regional airport serving Long Bawan in Krayan District, Nunukan Regency, North Kalimantan, Indonesia. The airport is named after Juvai Semaring, a heroic figure or powerful giant in the legends of the Dayak Lundayeh indigenous people of the Krayan Highlands. It serves Long Bawan and the surrounding areas, which are inaccessible by road and can only be reached by air. The airport is located approximately 9 km (5.6 miles) from the Indonesian–Malaysian border and 11 km (6.8 miles) from the nearby Malaysian town of Ba'kelalan. As of 2026, Susi Air is the sole airline operating at the airport, providing pioneer air services to other cities and towns in North Kalimantan.

== History ==
=== Construction and early history ===
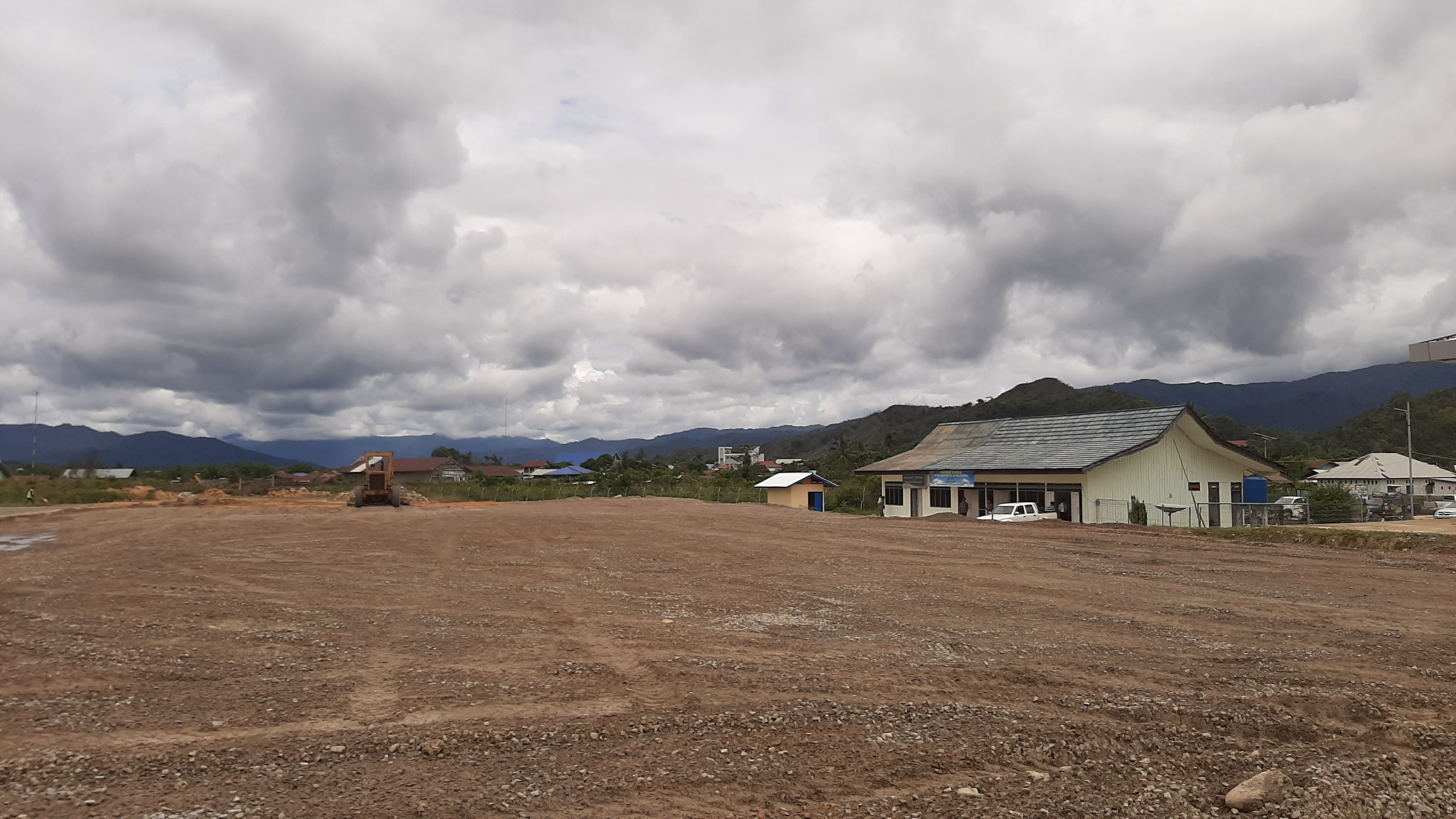
Former terminal at Juvai Semaring Airport, before 2019

Juvai Semaring Airport began as a small rural airstrip constructed by missionaries to provide access to remote communities in the Krayan Highlands. The first aircraft to land at Long Bawan arrived in 1973 and was operated by the Mission Aviation Fellowship (MAF). It was the first airfield to be established in the Krayan Highlands. At the time, the airfield could accommodate only small aircraft, such as the Douglas DC-3 and various Cessna aircraft. In 1975, the government began planning the development of the airport as part of a broader initiative to improve rural airfields across North Kalimantan, then part of East Kalimantan, and enhance their capacity to support pioneer air services.

The existence of Juvai Semaring Airport is crucial to the Krayan community. The region’s mountainous terrain and limited road connections make air transportation the primary means of travel and connectivity. The airport plays an essential role in the distribution of goods and supplies, access to healthcare and education, and the delivery of government services, while also supporting economic growth and development in the border region.

By the 1990s, the airport remained a modest rural airstrip. At the time, MAF operated several regular flights from Long Bawan to Malinau, from where passengers could continue their journey to Tarakan by boat. There were also direct flights between Long Bawan and Tarakan, which served as a regional hub for pioneer air services to remote and rural areas, with onward connections to Samarinda, the provincial capital of East Kalimantan.

In the early 2000s, the airport had a 900 m × 23 m runway, which was capable of accommodating only small aircraft such as the CASA C-212 Aviocar. With the creation of Nunukan Regency from Bulungan Regency in 1999, Dirgantara Air Services (DAS) began operating four weekly flights between Long Bawan and Nunukan, the administrative seat of Nunukan Regency, with onward connections to Tarakan. The service was operated using CASA C-212 aircraft.

In January 2008, DAS suspended flights to Long Bawan due to financial difficulties caused by rising fuel prices, a temporary lapse in its operating permit, and the need for its pilots to renew their licenses. As a result, the Nunukan Regency government terminated DAS's contract for pioneer routes and entered into a new partnership with Susi Air to provide pioneer services to Long Bawan. Service briefly resumed in August 2008 but was suspended again after only a few weeks. The suspension prompted local residents to blockade a DAS Britten-Norman BN-2A aircraft at Long Bawan for several hours on 9 September 2008.

=== Contemporary history ===
Between 2012 and 2013, the government undertook major upgrades to the airport, including extending the runway to 1,100 m × 30 m. The extension enabled the airport to accommodate larger aircraft, including the C-130 Hercules, which could transport essential supplies to local communities and provide logistical support to troops stationed along the border. The airport's location in the border region also gave it significant strategic importance for both economic development and national security. In addition to improving access to previously isolated communities and supporting local economic growth, the airport serves as an important link in the country's border security network. The development project was supported by the Indonesian Army Corps of Engineers and funded with Rp54.1 billion from the national and regional budgets. The project was inaugurated by then-President Susilo Bambang Yudhoyono on 15 September 2014, alongside the development of two other pioneer airports and several other infrastructure projects in East and North Kalimantan.

In 2016, following an inspection, Ministry of Transportation officials prohibited the airport from accommodating larger aircraft despite the runway extension, after finding that the extended runway did not meet the required specifications.

Major upgrades were carried out between 2019 and 2020, including the construction of a new two-story terminal and the extension of the runway to 1,600 m. These improvements enabled the airport to accommodate larger aircraft such as the ATR 42 and ATR 72. The project cost approximately Rp150 billion, funded by the Ministry of Transportation.

On 21 May 2021, the first ATR 42 landed at the airport on a Pelita Air charter flight transporting supplies for Pertamina's One Price Fuel Program. Previously, the airport was served exclusively by smaller aircraft, such as the Cessna Grand Caravan and de Havilland Canada DHC-6 Twin Otter, operating pioneer services.

== Facilities and development ==
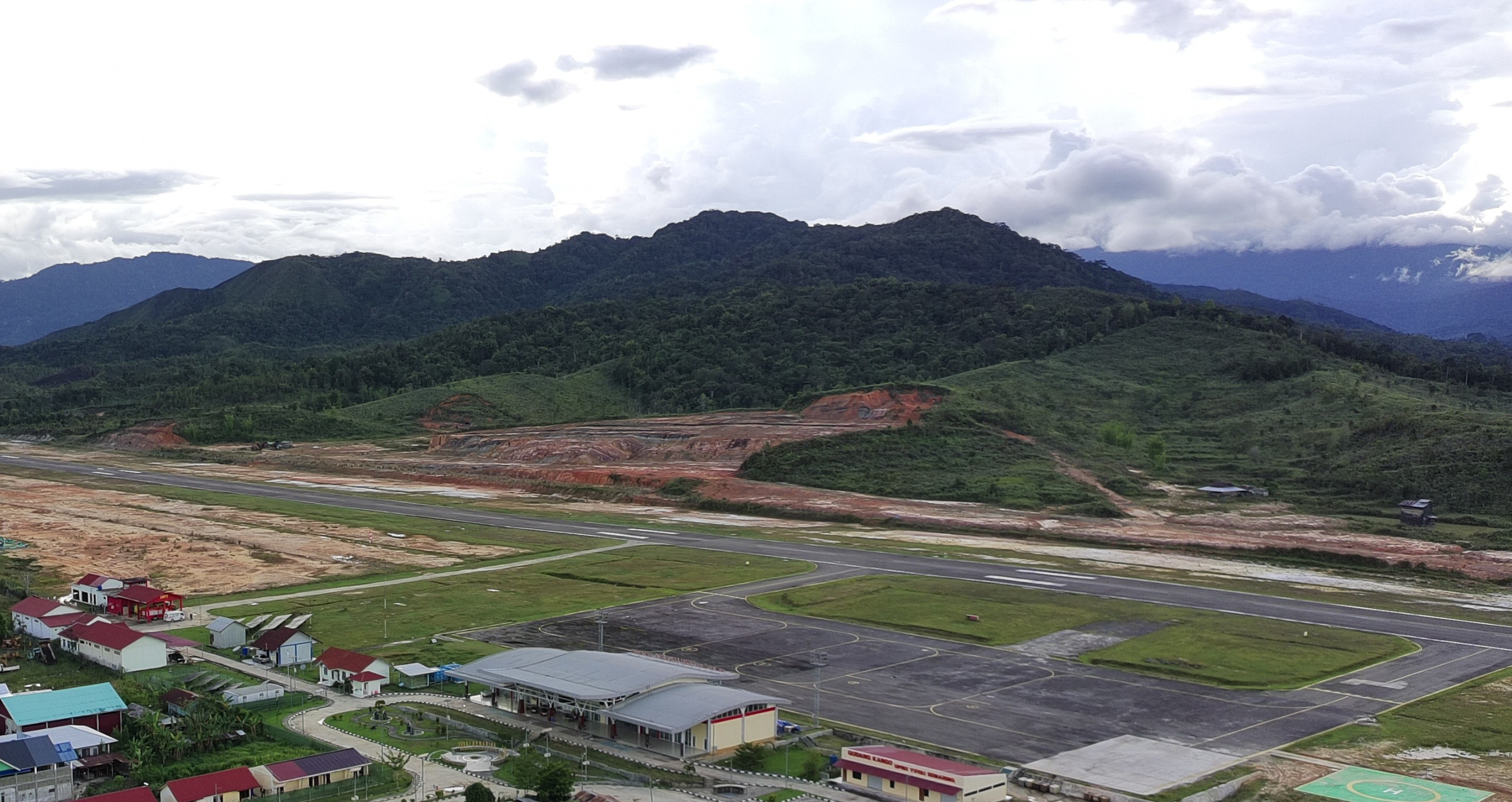
Aerial view of the airport compound

The airport has a two-story passenger terminal covering 1,000 m², with an annual capacity of 25,000 passengers. Its boarding gate can accommodate up to 250 passengers. The terminal is equipped with check-in counters, boarding gates, a baggage claim area, prayer rooms, and parking areas covering 2,265 m². It also features souvenir shops offering a variety of MSME products and traditional goods from the Dayak Lundayeh community, including handicrafts, processed foods, Adan Krayan rice, and other local products. In addition to the passenger terminal, the airport has a 200 m² cargo terminal, located adjacent to the passenger terminal, a 230 m² Aircraft Rescue and Fire Fighting (ARFF) building, a 110 m² AirNav Indonesia office building, a 700 m² operations building, a 200 m² meeting building, a 3,248 m² inspection road, and a 5,000 m² perimeter fence. An airport hotel is also located a short distance from the passenger terminal.

On the airside, the airport has a single 1,600 m × 30 m runway capable of accommodating aircraft such as the C-130 Hercules, ATR 42 and ATR 72, which was extended in several phases between 2012 and 2019, from its original length of just 900 m. The runway was upgraded in several stages over the years, including earthworks and embankment, the construction of a Runway End Safety Area (RESA) and overrun, aggregate surfacing, cement-treated base course (CTBC), asphalt-treated base (ATB), double turning pads, runway markings, and overlays of the existing runway and runway surface. The runway is a non-instrument runway and lacks published straight-in instrument approach procedures and electronic navigation aids such as an Instrument Landing System (ILS). In addition, the airport is also equipped with two taxiways, measuring 72 m × 18 m and 75 m × 18 m, respectively, and an apron measuring 170 m × 75 m.

== Airlines and destinations ==
Airlines	Destinations
Susi Air	Malinau, Nunukan, Tanjung Selor, Tarakan

== Statistics ==
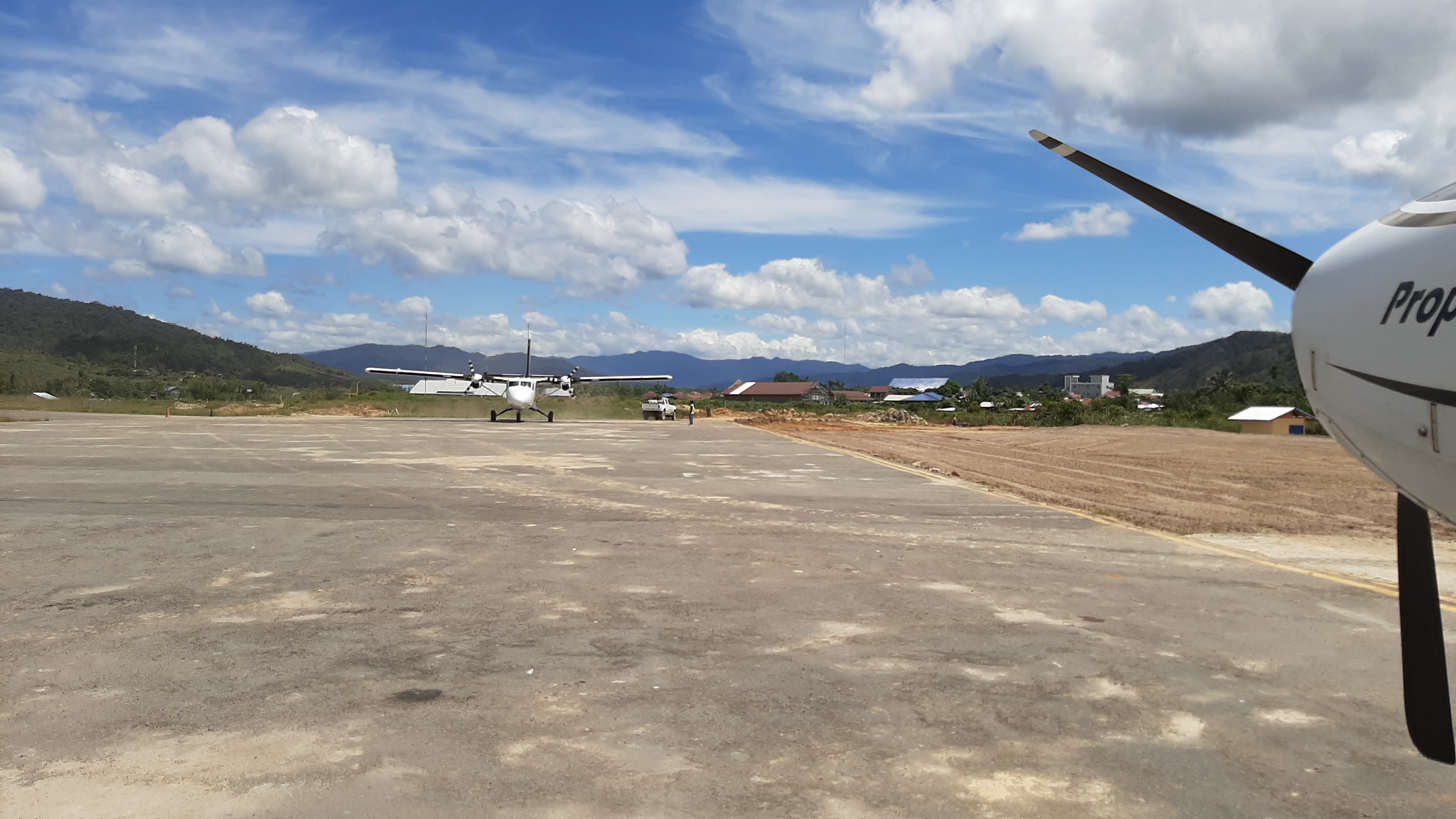
Aircraft at Juvai Semaring Airport

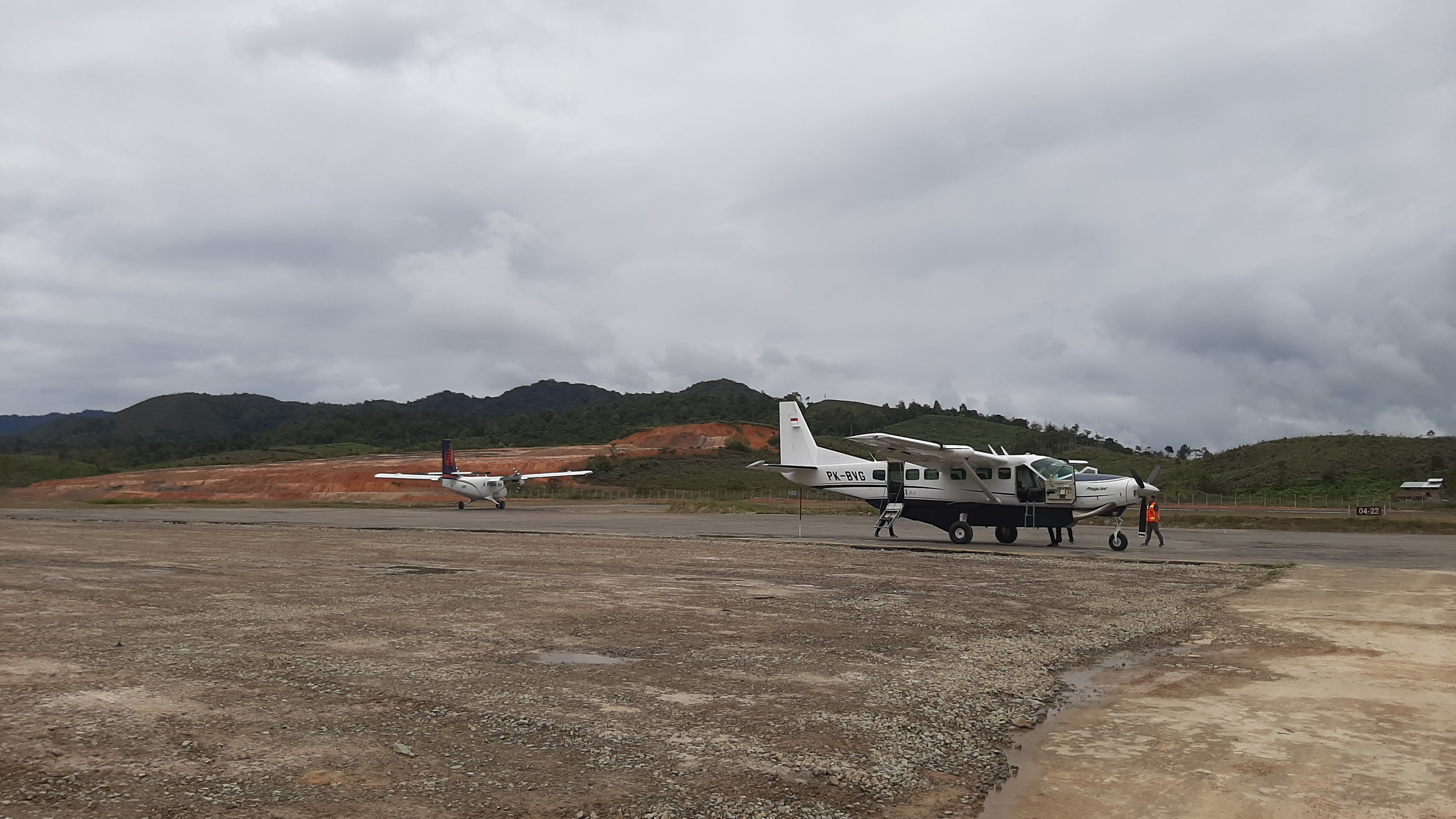
A Susi Air Cessna Grand Caravan at Juvai Semaring Airport

Annual passenger numbers and aircraft statistics
Year	Passengers handled	Passenger % change	Cargo (tonnes)	Cargo % change	Aircraft movements	Aircraft % change
2006	N/A	Steady	N/A	Steady	N/A	Steady
2007	N/A	Steady	N/A	Steady	N/A	Steady
2008	33,155	Steady	68.41	Steady	2,149	Steady
2009	23,942	▼27.8	96.56	▲41.1	1,114	▼48.2
2010	7,264	▼69.7	341.85	▲254.0	1,808	▲62.3
2011	12,480	▲71.8	80.34	▼76.5	2,566	▲41.9
2012	N/A	Steady	N/A	Steady	N/A	Steady
2013	N/A	Steady	N/A	Steady	N/A	Steady
2014	N/A	Steady	N/A	Steady	N/A	Steady
2015	15,294	Steady	134.98	Steady	2,504	Steady
2016	13,913	▼9.0	554.31	▲310.7	2,788	▲11.3
2017	14,725	▲5.8	876.145	▲58.1	2,406	▼13.7
2018	15,050	▲2.2	917.40	▲4.7	2,892	▲20.2
2019	15,273	▲1.5	1,185.70	▲29.2	2,816	▼2.6
2020	11,650	▼23.7	2,863.72	▲141.5	4,080	▲44.9
2021	12,189	▲4.6	4,167.77	▲45.5	6,816	▲67.1
2022	15,210	▲24.8	3,360.04	▼19.4	5,392	▼20.9
2023	10,928	▼28.2	1,546.91	▼54.0	2,560	▼52.5
2024	33,583	▲207.3	1,639.46	▲6.0	7,894	▲208.4
^{Source: DGCA, BPS}

== Accidents and incidents ==
- On 16 July 2002, a Sabang Merauke Raya Air Charter (SMAC) Britten-Norman Islander operating from Tarakan to Long Bawan crashed while on final approach to Juvai Semaring Airport. At an altitude of approximately 5,400 feet, the twin-engine aircraft struck trees and crashed in a wooded area about 8 km short of the runway. The wreckage was located six days later. Of the 10 people on board, one passenger was found alive and evacuated, while the other nine occupants were killed. For reasons that remain unknown, the aircraft was conducting the approach at an insufficient altitude.
- On 27 September 2021, a Smart Aviation Cessna 208B Grand Caravan EX operating a cargo flight from Tarakan to Long Bawan suffered a runway excursion after landing at Yuvai Semaring Airport. The aircraft veered off the runway and entered a ditch, damaging the propeller and causing the nose landing gear to collapse. Both pilots were uninjured. The aircraft was carrying diesel fuel.
- On 19 February 2026, a Pelita Air Air Tractor AT-802 operating a cargo flight from Long Bawan to Tarakan crashed shortly after takeoff from Juvai Semaring Airport. An eyewitness, an apron personnel, reported seeing the aircraft “nose-diving toward the ground.” The wreckage was subsequently found about 5 km from the runway, and the pilot was pronounced dead.
