= Sembakung =

- District
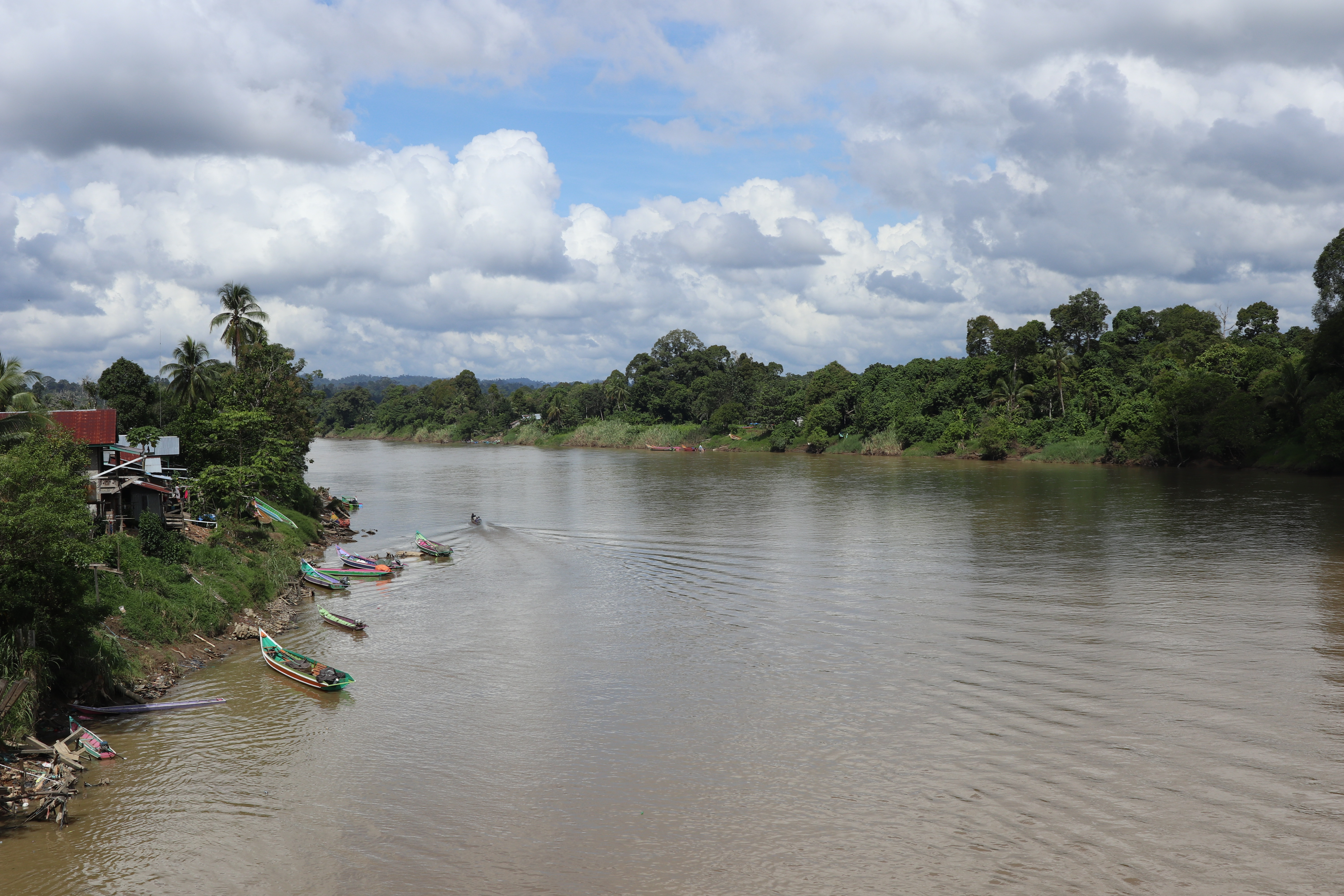
- Sembakung river

- Location within North Kalimantan Location within Kalimantan Location within Indonesia
- Coordinates: 3°51′20.1251″N 117°2′43.0228″E
- Country: Indonesia
- Province: North Kalimantan
- Regency: Nunukan
- District seat: Atap

Area
  - Total: 1,764.94 km^{2} (681.45 sq mi)

Population (2024)
  - Total: 7,076
  - Density: 4.009/km^{2} (10.38/sq mi)

Sembakung is a district (kecamatan) in Nunukan Regency, North Kalimantan, Indonesia. As of 2024, it was inhabited by 7,076 people, and has a total area of 1,764.94 km^{2}.

== Geography ==
Sembakung District consists of ten villages (desa):

- Atap
- Butas Bagu
- Labuk
- Lubakan
- Manuk Bungkul
- Pagar
- Pelaju
- Tagul
- Tepian
- Tujung
