= Long Berayang =

- Location in Kalimantan and Indonesia Long Berayang (Indonesia)
- Coordinates: 4°8′25.43″N 115°48′49.352″E
- Country: Indonesia
- Province: North Kalimantan
- Regency: Nunukan Regency
- District: Krayan District
- Elevation: 6,519 ft (1,987 m)

Population (2010)
  - Total: 63
- Time zone: UTC+8 (Indonesia Central Standard Time)

Long Berayang is a village in Krayan District, Nunukan Regency in North Kalimantan province of Indonesia. Its coordinates are 4°8′25.43″N 115°48′49.352″E and its population was 63 in 2010.

== Climate ==
Long Berayang has a subtropical highland climate with mild weather year-round and heavy rainfall.

Climate data for Long Berayang
Month	Jan	Feb	Mar	Apr	May	Jun	Jul	Aug	Sep	Oct	Nov	Dec	Year
Mean daily maximum °C (°F)	20.7 (69.3)	20.6 (69.1)	20.6 (69.1)	20.4 (68.7)	20.1 (68.2)	19.6 (67.3)	19.4 (66.9)	19.6 (67.3)	19.9 (67.8)	20.1 (68.2)	20.6 (69.1)	21.3 (70.3)	20.2 (68.4)
Daily mean °C (°F)	16.9 (62.4)	16.8 (62.2)	16.8 (62.2)	16.6 (61.9)	16.5 (61.7)	16.1 (61.0)	15.9 (60.6)	16.0 (60.8)	16.2 (61.2)	16.5 (61.7)	16.9 (62.4)	17.5 (63.5)	16.6 (61.8)
Mean daily minimum °C (°F)	13.2 (55.8)	13.1 (55.6)	13.0 (55.4)	12.9 (55.2)	13.0 (55.4)	12.7 (54.9)	12.5 (54.5)	12.5 (54.5)	12.5 (54.5)	12.9 (55.2)	13.3 (55.9)	13.7 (56.7)	12.9 (55.3)
Average precipitation mm (inches)	173 (6.8)	180 (7.1)	192 (7.6)	235 (9.3)	295 (11.6)	206 (8.1)	216 (8.5)	195 (7.7)	213 (8.4)	192 (7.6)	216 (8.5)	222 (8.7)	2,535 (99.9)
Source: Climate-Data.org
