= Mentarang =

- District
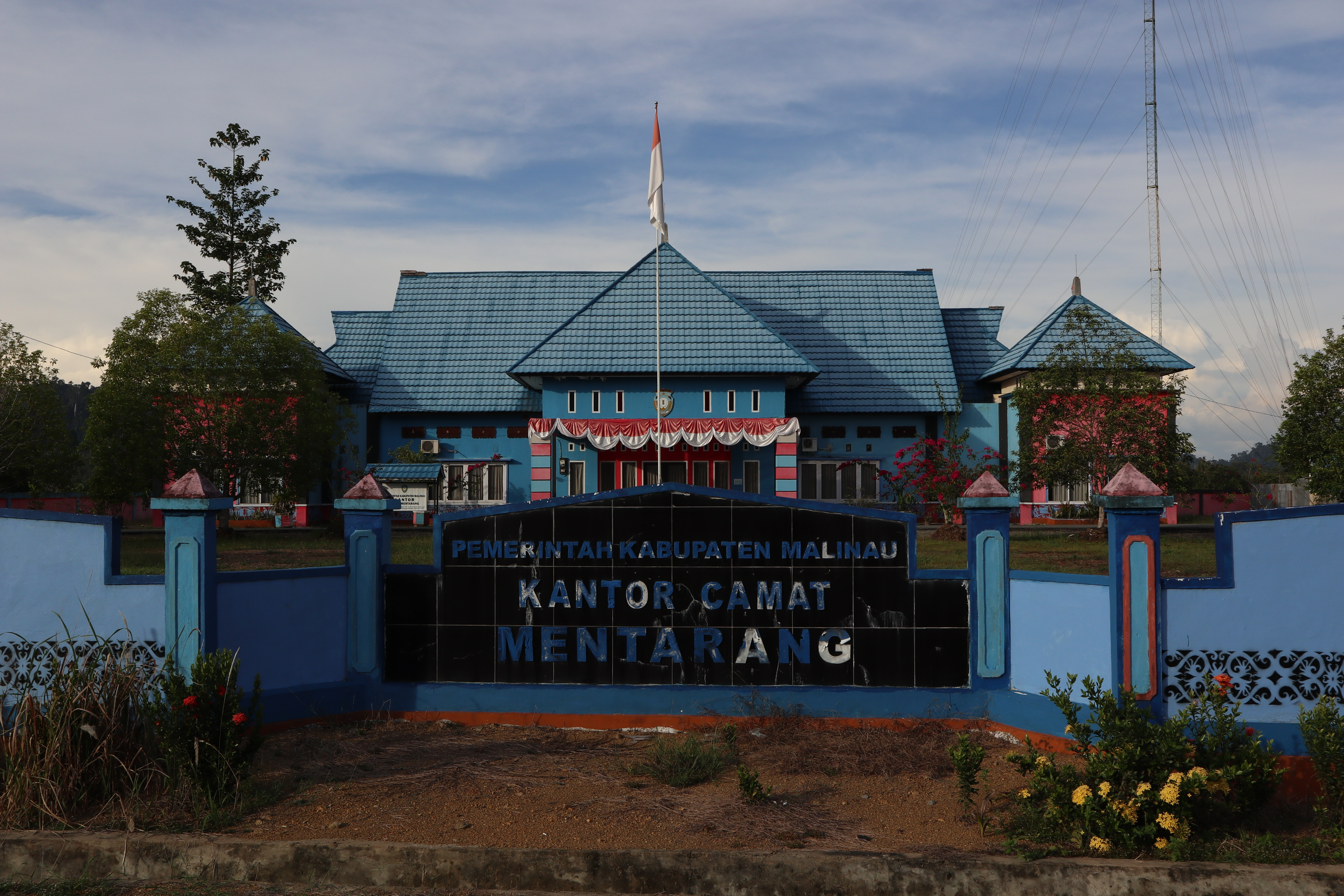
- Mentarang District office

- Location within North Kalimantan Location within Kalimantan Location within Indonesia
- Coordinates: 3°31′16.287″N 116°31′29.4352″E
- Country: Indonesia
- Province: North Kalimantan
- Regency: Malinau
- District seat: Pulau Sapi

Area
  - Total: 535.15 km^{2} (206.62 sq mi)

Population (2020)
  - Total: 5,909
  - Density: 11.04/km^{2} (28.60/sq mi)

Mentarang is a district (kecamatan) in Malinau Regency, North Kalimantan, Indonesia. As of 2020 Census, it was inhabited by 5,909 people, and has a total area of 535.15 km^{2}.

== Geography ==
Mentarang District consists of nine villages (desa):

- Harapan Maju
- Lidung Kemenci
- Long Bisai
- Long Gafid
- Long Liku
- Mentarang Baru
- Paking
- Pulau Sapi
- Temalang
