= Malinau Kota =

- Town
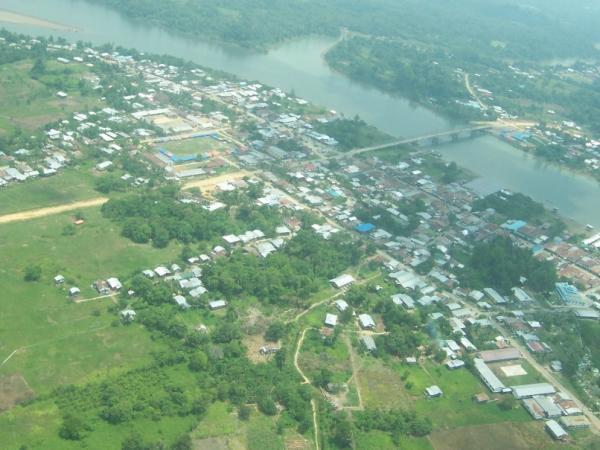
- Malinau Kota at noon

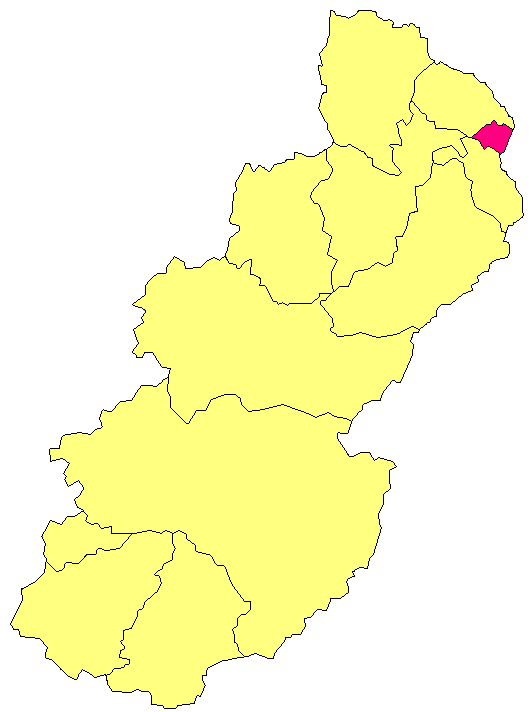
- Location within Malinau Regency

- Location in Kalimantan and Indonesia Malinau Kota (Indonesia)
- Coordinates: 03°35′17″N 116°37′24″E
- Country: Indonesia
- Province: North Kalimantan
- Regency: Malinau Regency

Area
  - Total: 142.07 km^{2} (54.85 sq mi)

Population (mid 2022 estimate)
  - Total: 27,736
  - Density: 195.23/km^{2} (505.64/sq mi)
- Time zone: UTC+8 (ICST)
- Area code: (+62) 551
- Villages: 6

Malinau Kota is a district and the regency seat of Malinau Regency in North Kalimantan province. The town is the economic center of the regency, largest town in the regency, and serves as a gateway for interior towns and villages around the Heart of Borneo especially neighbouring Krayan region in Nunukan Regency. It had a population of 27,736 (or around 32.5% of the entire regency's population) in mid 2022.

== Geography ==
The district borders North Malinau District in the north, Western Malinau District in the south and western, and Tana Tidung Regency in the east.

=== Climate ===
Malinau has a tropical rainforest climate (Af) with heavy to very heavy rainfall year-round.

Climate data for Malinau
Month	Jan	Feb	Mar	Apr	May	Jun	Jul	Aug	Sep	Oct	Nov	Dec	Year
Mean daily maximum °C (°F)	30.0 (86.0)	30.0 (86.0)	30.4 (86.7)	30.9 (87.6)	31.1 (88.0)	31.2 (88.2)	31.1 (88.0)	31.1 (88.0)	31.1 (88.0)	30.9 (87.6)	30.8 (87.4)	30.4 (86.7)	30.7 (87.4)
Daily mean °C (°F)	26.6 (79.9)	26.6 (79.9)	27.0 (80.6)	27.4 (81.3)	27.5 (81.5)	27.5 (81.5)	27.3 (81.1)	27.2 (81.0)	27.3 (81.1)	27.1 (80.8)	27.2 (81.0)	26.9 (80.4)	27.1 (80.8)
Mean daily minimum °C (°F)	23.3 (73.9)	23.3 (73.9)	23.6 (74.5)	23.9 (75.0)	23.9 (75.0)	23.8 (74.8)	23.5 (74.3)	23.4 (74.1)	23.5 (74.3)	23.4 (74.1)	23.6 (74.5)	23.5 (74.3)	23.6 (74.4)
Average rainfall mm (inches)	235 (9.3)	192 (7.6)	270 (10.6)	268 (10.6)	358 (14.1)	332 (13.1)	298 (11.7)	278 (10.9)	326 (12.8)	329 (13.0)	341 (13.4)	278 (10.9)	3,505 (138)
Source: Climate-Data.org

== Demographics ==
The district has a population of 25,596 people or 31% of the regency's population, spread out across six administrative villages within the district. Most of the district's population is concentrated on the village with the same name as the district, Malinau Kota, which consists of 51% of the district's population. This followed by Malinau Hulu village with 26%.

The population, as with most of places in Indonesia, is relatively young and dominated by a demographic age of 15 to 64. The district also has a dependency ratio of 46.79 which means that between 100 people, there are 46 or 47 people that are considered unproductive or not working.

== Economy ==
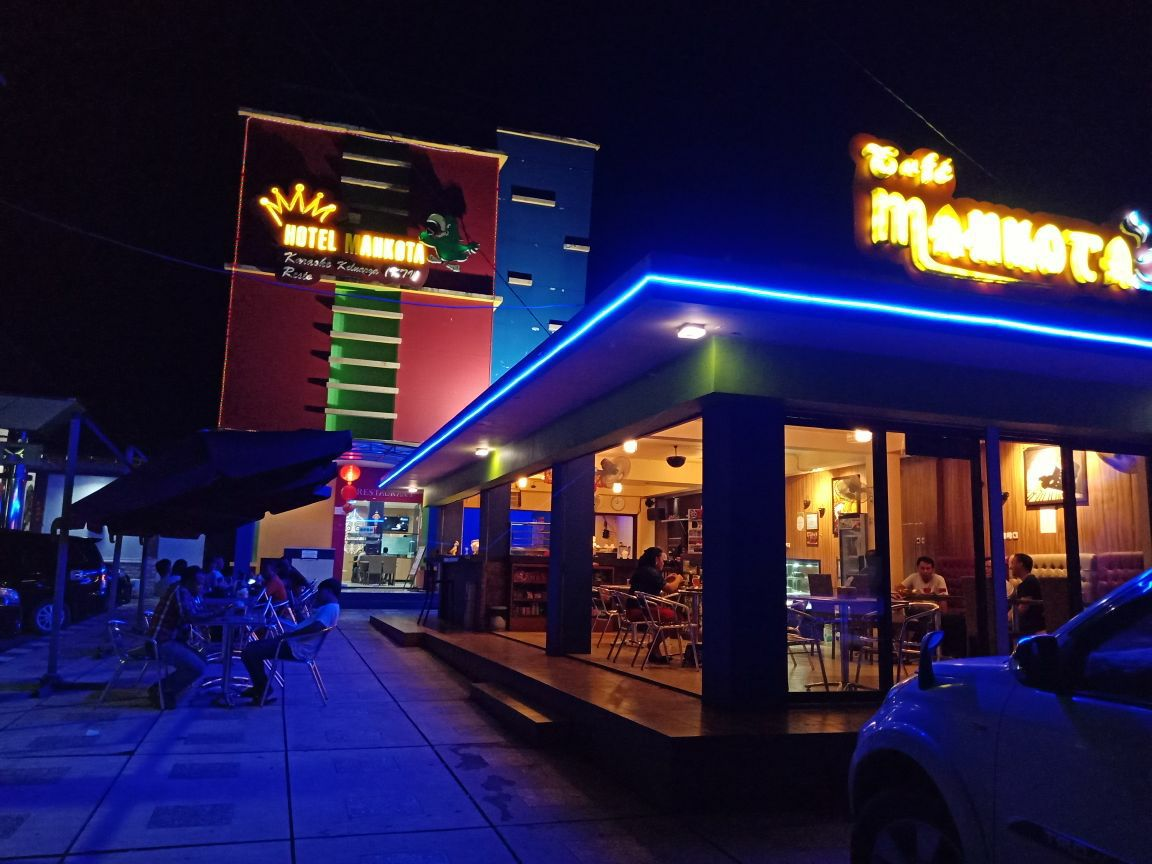
A cafe in Malinau Kota

Being the capital of the regency, the district has limited agricultural products and mostly have shifted to secondary or tertiary sectors. It has a limited amount of cultivated area, with only 17 hectares being cultivated for vegetables and fruits in 2021. The agriculture output in the same year includes 480 quintals of red chili, 1,840 quintals of cayenne pepper, 100 quintals of spinach, 300 quintals of water spinach, and 800 quintals of watermelons. There are also various fruits produced from the district such as durian, tangerine, mango, jackfruit, and papaya.

Due to limited infrastructure in surrounding districts, neighbouring villages' residents often have to travel to the district for access to basic financial services or to trade their agricultural products. This resulted in the district being an important economic center in the region in general. There are 8 branches of banks in the district, 6 in Malinau Kota village and 2 in Malinau Hulu village. Hotels and inns are concentrated in the district, with 12 out of 15 accommodations in the entire regency located in the district. Almost 70% of visitors to the regency are concentrated in the district, along with more than 70% of the regency's registered restaurants or 119 out of 168 restaurants in the entire regency in 2021. The village of Malinau Kota hosts 17 registered minimarket and convenience stores. The district is gateway to Krayan through a road that is as of 2022 still under construction, making the district a potential tourism gateway.

== Governance ==
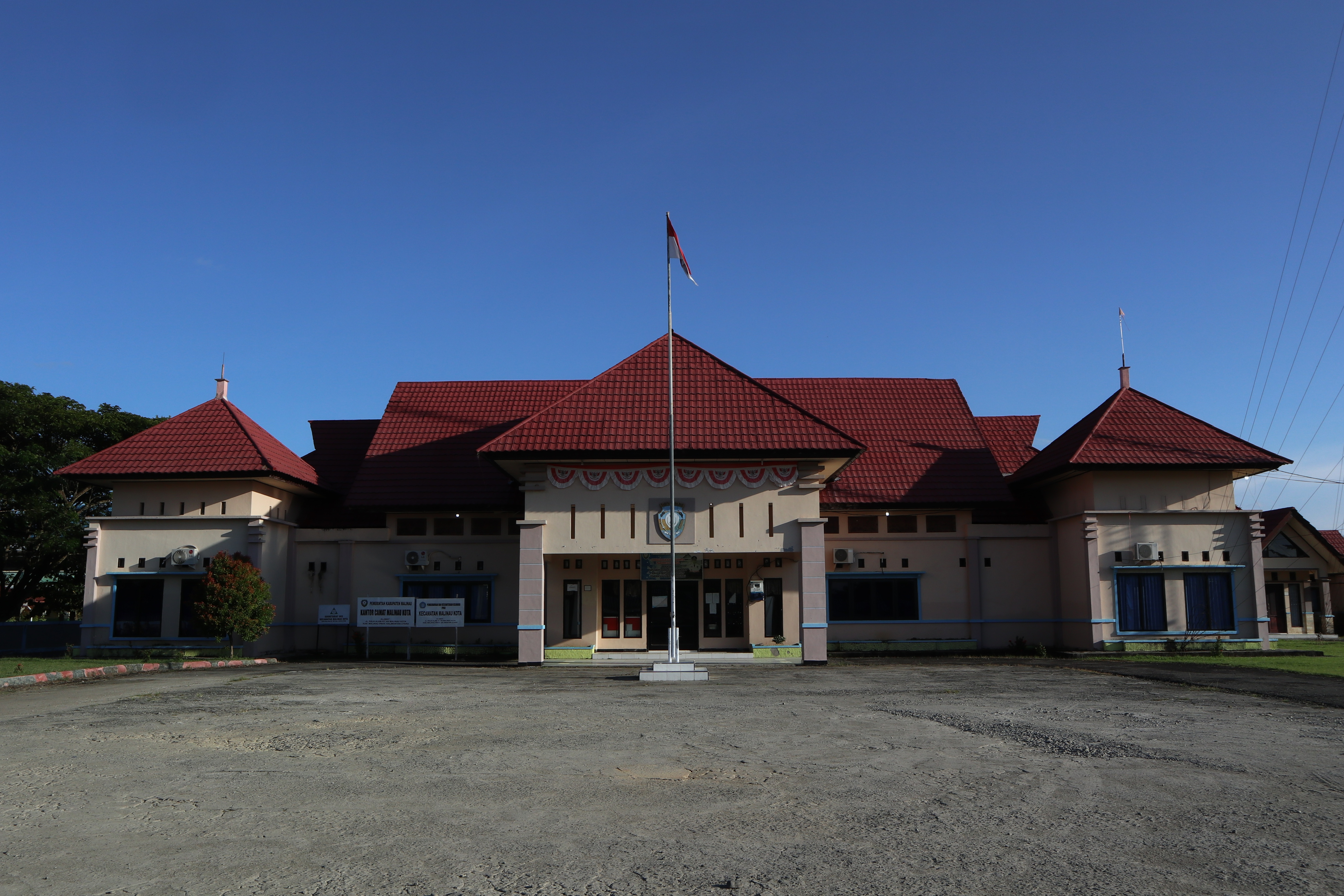
District office of Malinau Kota

As a district, it is a third-level administrative region under a regency. A district head (camat) is appointed directly by the regent with recommendation from the regency secretary. Malinau Kota itself has no parliament. The district is divided into six administrative villages (desa) with below listed the villages as well as the population as of 2021.

- Batu Lidung (1,598)
- Tanjung Keranjang (643)
- Malinau Hilir (1,354)
- Malinau Kota (13,067)
- Pelita Kanaan (2,233)
- Malinau Hulu (6,701)

On regency level, the district is part of Malinau 1st electoral district together with North Malinau, Mentarang, Mentarang Hulu, and Sungai Tubu District sends 12 out of 20 representatives to regency's parliament. The last election was in 2019 and the next one would be in 2024.

== Infrastructure ==
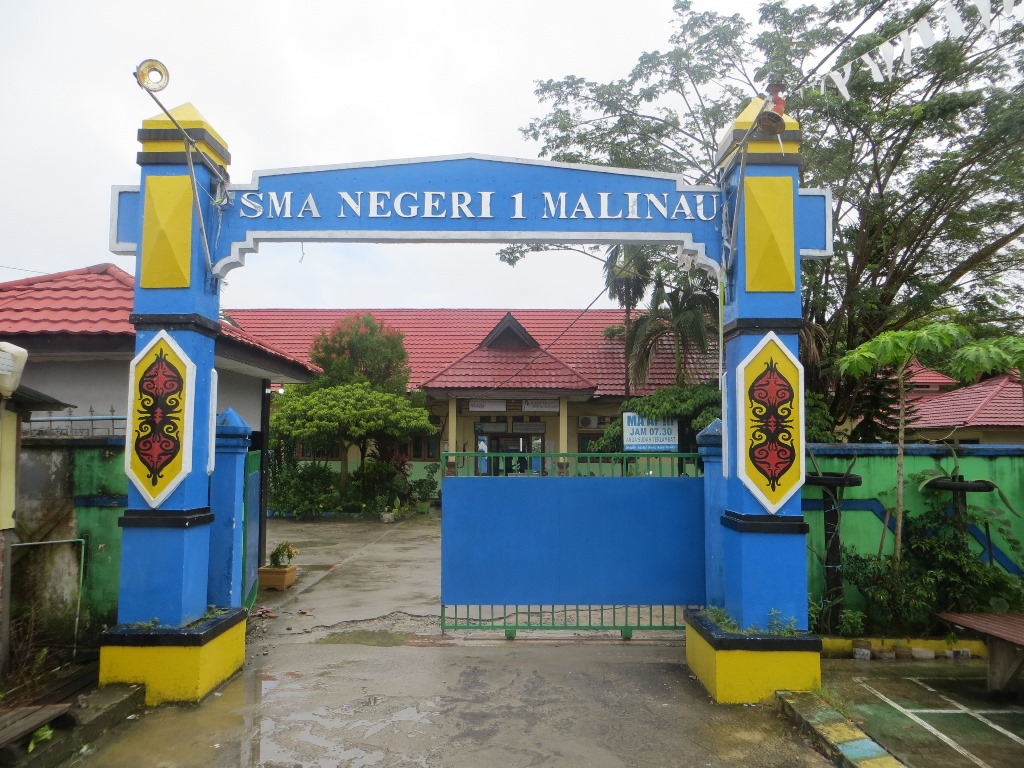
A senior highschool in Malinau Kota

The district has 12 kindergartens, 13 elementary schools, 6 junior high schools, 4 senior high schools, in addition to one vocational high school. In addition, one of two regency's only tertiary education institution, Malinau Polytechnic, is located in the district. The education infrastructure of the regency in general is mainly concentrated in this district, where many parents sent their children for school or college due to lack of facilities in other districts. The district has one polyclinic, one puskesmas, and 10 pharmacies. There are 54 mosques, 48 churches, 2 pura, and 4 Chinese temples in the district. The main market buildings are located in Malinau Kota and Pelita Kanaan.

The villages of Malinau Kota, Pelita Kanaan, and Malinau Hulu are served by angkots with fixed route. The road within the district are sealed with asphalt and considered passable during all weather year long as of 2021. There are total 17 base transceiver station towers in the district as of 2021. All of villages except Malinau Hilir has access to 4G within the same year. Postal and delivery companies have branches in Batu Lidung, Malinau Kota, Pelita Kanaan, and Malinau Hulu.

The district is home to a cultural stage building, named Fadan Liu' Burung which was inaugurated in 2020 and is the cultural center of the regency where performances and events are held. The stage is located close to town square of the district, Pro Sehat Pelangi Intimung Square or shortened to Prosehat Square (Indonesian: Lapangan Prosehat) which features several sport and exercise facilities such as jogging track and basketball court. The district is home to main stadium of the regency, Malinau Main Stadium and is home to club Persemal Malinau. There's a bus terminal located in the district which is mainly used by bus operated by Perum DAMRI to and from Nunukan Regency and Tanjung Selor.
