= Tulin =

Tulin may refer to:

== People ==
- Mark Tulin (1948 – 2011), an American bass guitarist
- Marshall P. Tulin (1926 - 2019), an American engineer
- Yuri Tulin (1921 – 1988), a Soviet Russian painter
- Zbigniew Tulin (born 1976), a Polish sprinter

== Places ==
- Tulin, Purulia, a village in West Bengal, India
- Tulin Onsoi, a district in North Kalimantan, Indonesia

== Other uses ==
- Tulin (geology), a form of geological clay formation
- Tulin (Legend of Zelda character), a supporting character from The Legend of Zelda video game series
