= Anang Busra =

Anang Busra was an Indonesian Air Force airman and Indonesian nationalist from Malinau Regency, today's North Kalimantan.

== Career ==
Born in Malinau on 7 March 1923, he spent most of his adulthood in Tarakan. He later joined Ikatan Nasional Indonesia (Indonesian National Bond) based in Balikpapan and involved in Indonesian National Revolution. On 1946, he raised flag of Indonesia in a building in Tarakan, which by that time was mostly still under the Japanese military. He later joined the airforce and after passed the exam, was deployed across the country until 1968 where he returned to Tarakan. He later became vice-chairman of National Sports Committee in the city. He died in March 1996 due to illness.

== Legacy ==
An airforce base in Tarakan was named after him in 2018. The name change has been proposed since 2015 by local government and approved by his family.
