= List of districts of North Kalimantan =

The province of North Kalimantan in Indonesia is divided into kabupaten or regencies which in turn are divided administratively into districts, known as kecamatan.

The districts of North Kalimantan with the regency it falls into are as follows:

- Bahau Hulu, Malinau
- Betayau, Tana Tidung
- Bunyu, Bulungan
- Kayan Hilir, Malinau
- Kayan Hulu, Malinau
- Kayan Selatan, Malinau
- Krayan Barat, Nunukan
- Krayan Selatan, Nunukan
- Krayan Tengah, Nunukan
- Krayan Timur, Nunukan
- Krayan, Nunukan
- Lumbis Ogong, Nunukan
- Lumbis, Nunukan
- Malinau Barat, Malinau
- Malinau Kota, Malinau
- Malinau Selatan, Malinau
- Malinau Utara, Malinau
- Mentarang Hulu, Malinau
- Mentarang, Malinau
- Muruk Rian, Tana Tidung
- Nunukan Selatan, Nunukan
- Nunukan, Nunukan
- Peso Hilir, Bulungan
- Peso, Bulungan
- Pujungan, Malinau
- Sebatik Barat, Nunukan
- Sebatik Tengah, Nunukan
- Sebatik Timur, Nunukan
- Sebatik Utara, Nunukan
- Sebatik, Nunukan
- Sebuku, Nunukan
- Sei Menggaris, Nunukan
- Sekatak, Bulungan
- Sembakung Atulai, Nunukan
- Sembakung, Nunukan
- Sesayap Hilir, Tana Tidung
- Sesayap, Tana Tidung
- Sungai Boh, Malinau
- Tana Lia, Tana Tidung
- Tanjung Palas Barat, Bulungan
- Tanjung Palas Tengah, Bulungan
- Tanjung Palas Timur, Bulungan
- Tanjung Palas Utara, Bulungan
- Tanjung Palas, Bulungan
- Tanjung Selor, Bulungan
- Tarakan Barat, Tarakan
- Tarakan Tengah, Tarakan
- Tarakan Timur, Tarakan
- Tarakan Utara, Tarakan
- Tulin Onsoi, Nunukan
