= Nunukan Airport =

Airport in Indonesia

Nunukan Airport Bandar Udara Nunukan
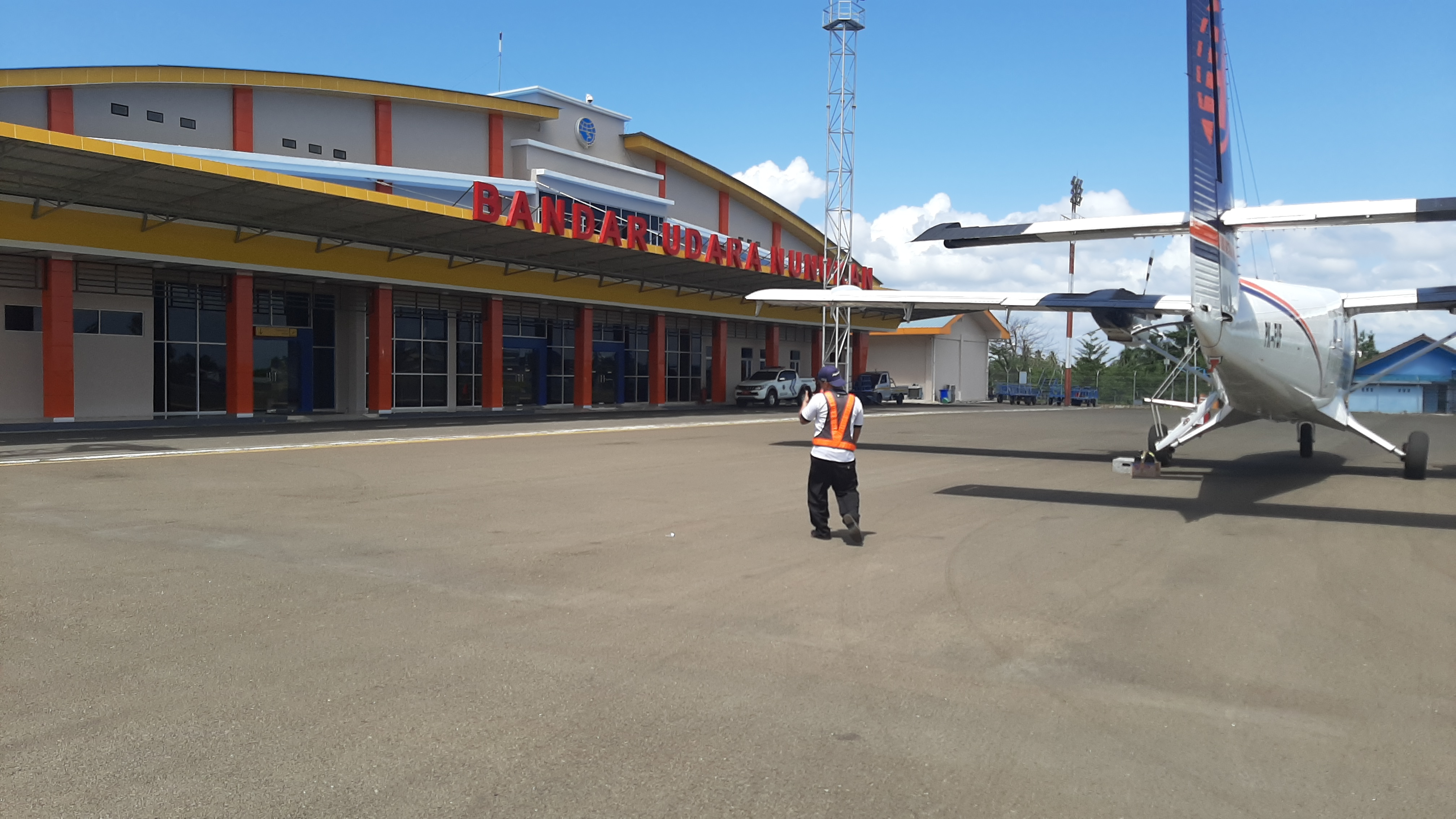
- IATA: NNX; ICAO: WAQA

Summary
- Airport type: Public
- Owner: Government of Indonesia
- Operator: Directorate General of Civil Aviation
- Serves: Nunukan
- Location: Nunukan, Nunukan Regency, North Kalimantan, Indonesia
- Time zone: WITA (UTC+08:00)
- Elevation AMSL: 12 m (39 ft)
- Coordinates: 04°08′12″N 117°40′01″E

Map
- Location in Kalimantan

Runways
Direction	Length		Surface
Direction	m	ft	Surface
13/31	1,600	5,249	Asphalt

Statistics (2024)
- Passengers: 8,532 (▼7.1%)
- Cargo (tonnes): 32.03 (▲82.6%)
- Aircraft movements: 1,225 (▼14.2%)
- Source: DGCA

Nunukan Airport (IATA: NNX, ICAO: WAQA) is a domestic regional airport serving Nunukan, the administrative seat of Nunukan Regency, in the province of North Kalimantan, Indonesia. The airport is located close to Nunukan town centre, approximately 1.5 km (0.9 mi) away, and serves as a main gateway to Nunukan and the surrounding areas. The airport's location on Nunukan Island, near the international border between Indonesia and Malaysia, gives it additional importance for transportation and connectivity in the border region. The airport currently serves only pioneer routes to rural areas of North Kalimantan, with Susi Air as its sole operator. In the past, it also had direct flights to Tarakan, the largest city in North Kalimantan, operated by Trigana Air, Kalstar Aviation, and Wings Air. These services have since been discontinued.

== History ==
=== Construction and early history ===
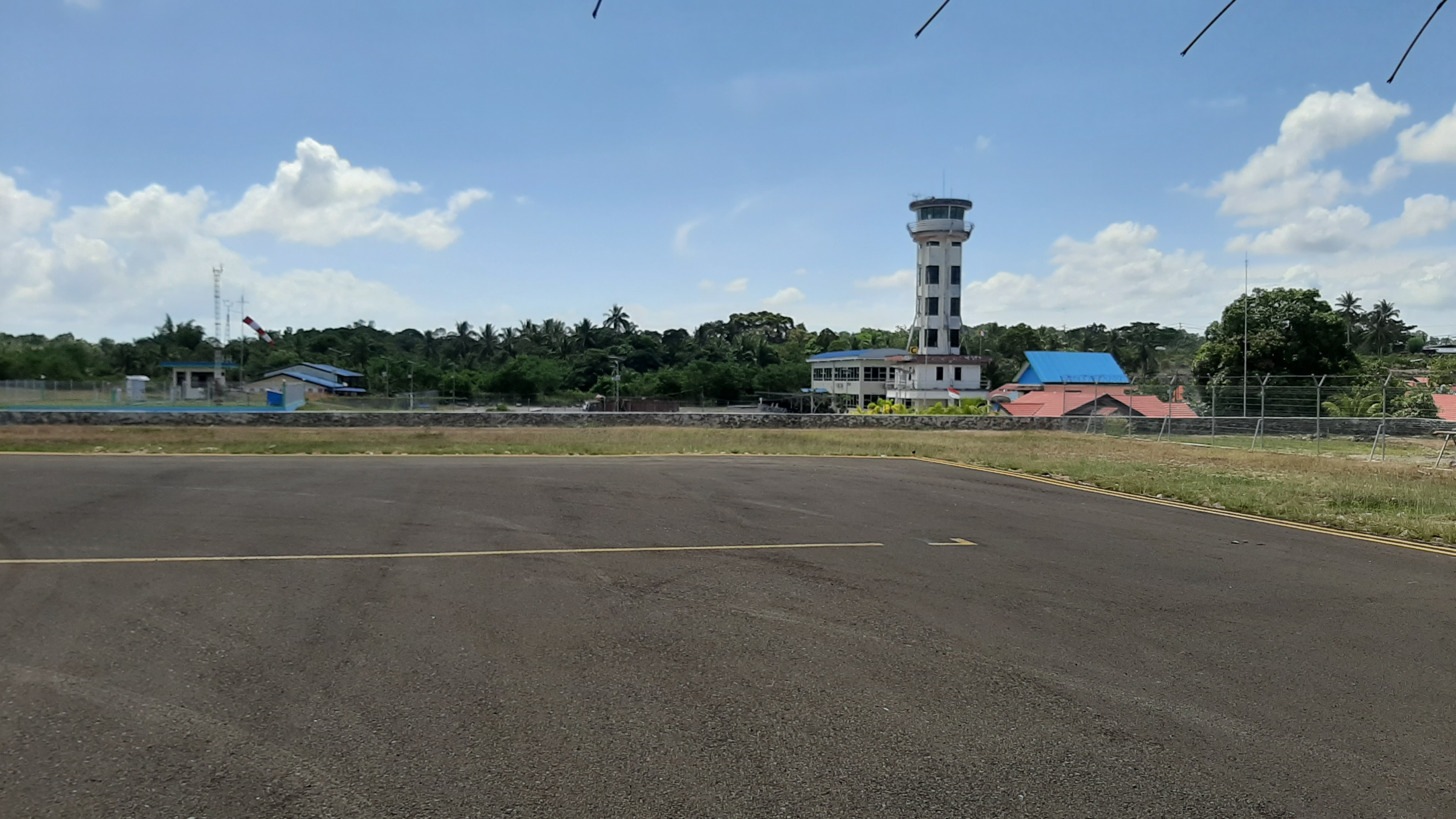
ATC tower

Plans to construct an airfield in Nunukan had been under consideration since the late 1970s, owing to the town’s relative isolation from other population centers in the region. The district head at the time established a committee to raise funds for the project, which collected approximately Rp3 million toward the construction of the airfield.

Nunukan Airport was originally constructed in the early 1990s as a pioneer airstrip, with its development planned and supported by Inhutani, a subsidiary of Perhutani, a state-owned forestry company. The airstrip was built primarily to support Inhutani’s logging operations in Nunukan and the surrounding areas, providing access to the company’s remote forestry concessions and facilitating the transportation of personnel and supplies. Initially, Nunukan Airport was operated as a pioneer airport under the administration of Nunukan District, then part of Bulungan Regency in East Kalimantan Province. At the time, the airport had a 600-metre-long and 23-metre-wide runway and was served by pioneer aircraft operated by organizations such as Mission Aviation Fellowship (MAF) and Asahi. These services primarily operated on the Tarakan–Nunukan route in both directions.

In December 1992, the management of Nunukan Airport, along with its associated assets, was transferred from the East Kalimantan provincial government to the Directorate General of Civil Aviation under the Ministry of Transportation. When the Directorate General of Civil Aviation initially assumed responsibility for Nunukan Airport, the airport was placed under the management of Juwata Airport in Tarakan. This arrangement remained in place until 1995, when Nunukan Airport was established as an independently managed airport with its own administration. At the time, Dirgantara Air Service (DAS) was the sole airline serving Nunukan Airport, operating a daily Tarakan–Nunukan return service with a seven-seat Britten-Norman BN-2A aircraft.

By 2000, the runway had been extended to 900 meters and widened to 23 meters, DAS to introduce its 18-seat CASA C-212 aircraft on the Tarakan–Nunukan–Long Bawan route. At the time, DAS operated four weekly flights to Nunukan from Tarakan. In 2005, the runway was further extended to 1,100 metres and widened to 30 meters. Two years later, in 2007, Trigana Air Service began operating ATR 42 aircraft with 42 passenger seats on the Tarakan–Nunukan route, with two daily return flights. In 2008, Kalstar Aviation also began serving Nunukan with ATR 42 aircraft on the Tarakan–Nunukan–Tarakan route.

=== Contemporary history ===
To improve connectivity for communities in remote areas, the Nunukan Regency Government introduced a subsidized passenger and cargo transport program in cooperation with pioneer airlines such as Susi Air, Sabang Merauke Raya Air Charter (SMAC), and Aviastar. These services operated routes from Nunukan to remote destinations in Nunukan Regency, including Long Bawan, Long Layu, and Binuang.

In 2013, major development plans were proposed to bring the airport up to international standards. These included extending the runway to accommodate larger aircraft such as the ATR 72. The project was to be funded jointly through the national budget (APBN) and the regional budget (APBD). The development was estimated to require a total budget of approximately Rp300 million.

To improve the airport’s facilities and infrastructure, the runway was extended in 2017 to 1,450 meters and widened to 30 meters. Following this, the airport management began lobbying for the introduction of direct flights between Nunukan and Balikpapan, which would provide the airport with onward connectivity to other cities across Indonesia.

In late 2018, Wings Air began serving Nunukan with 72-seat ATR 72 aircraft on the Tarakan–Nunukan route. However, the route was suspended in 2020 due to the COVID-19 pandemic. Although the airline initially planned to resume the service in January 2022, the plan was ultimately cancelled. As of 2026, the Nunukan Regency Government continues to lobby Wings Air to resume the route.

In 2019, the Nunukan Regency Government proposed designating Nunukan Airport as an international airport, paving the way for the introduction of international flights to Tawau, Malaysia. The proposal was driven by growing passenger demand on the Nunukan–Tawau route and was to be submitted to the Ministry of Transportation for consideration.

== Facilities and development ==
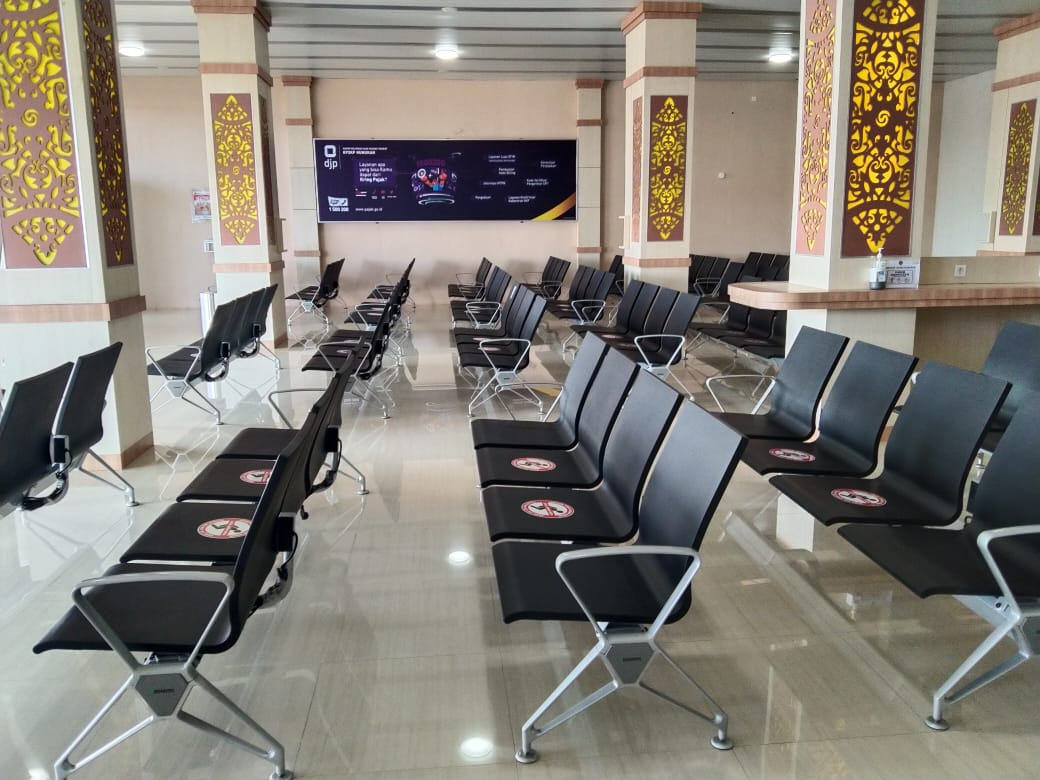
Boarding gate

The passenger terminal covers an area of 1,500 m² and is relatively modest in size, offering basic facilities for departing and arriving passengers, including check-in counters, departure gates, a baggage claim area, a canteen, prayer rooms, a children’s playground, and other passenger amenities. The airport also has a 200 m² cargo terminal and a 70 m² VIP terminal, which was constructed in 2012 at a cost of approximately Rp500 million. Other airport facilities include a 1,000 m² parking area, a 600 m² administration building, a 25 m² Non-Directional Beacon (NDB) building, a 400 m² Aircraft Rescue and Fire Fighting (PKP-PK) building, an air traffic control (ATC) tower, and a perimeter fence extending approximately 4,100 meters.

On the airside, the airport has a single runway measuring 1,600 by 30 meters, which is theoretically capable of accommodating aircraft up to the size of the ATR 72. However, only 1,450 meters of the runway is currently available for operations. Under the original master plan, the runway is planned to be extended to 1,800 meters, with a long-term target of 2,000 meters to enable the airport to accommodate larger aircraft, including narrow-body jets such as the Boeing 737 and Airbus A320. Implementation of the planned extension has faced challenges, particularly related to land clearing and budget constraints, which were exacerbated by cuts in government spending during the COVID-19 pandemic. In addition to the runway, the airport has two taxiways, each measuring 77 by 18 meters, and an aircraft apron measuring 155 by 77 meters. The apron and taxiways are also planned to be expanded and widened in the future to support increased aircraft movements and accommodate larger aircraft.

== Airlines and destinations ==
Airlines	Destinations
Susi Air	Binuang, Long Bawan, Long Layu

== Statistics ==
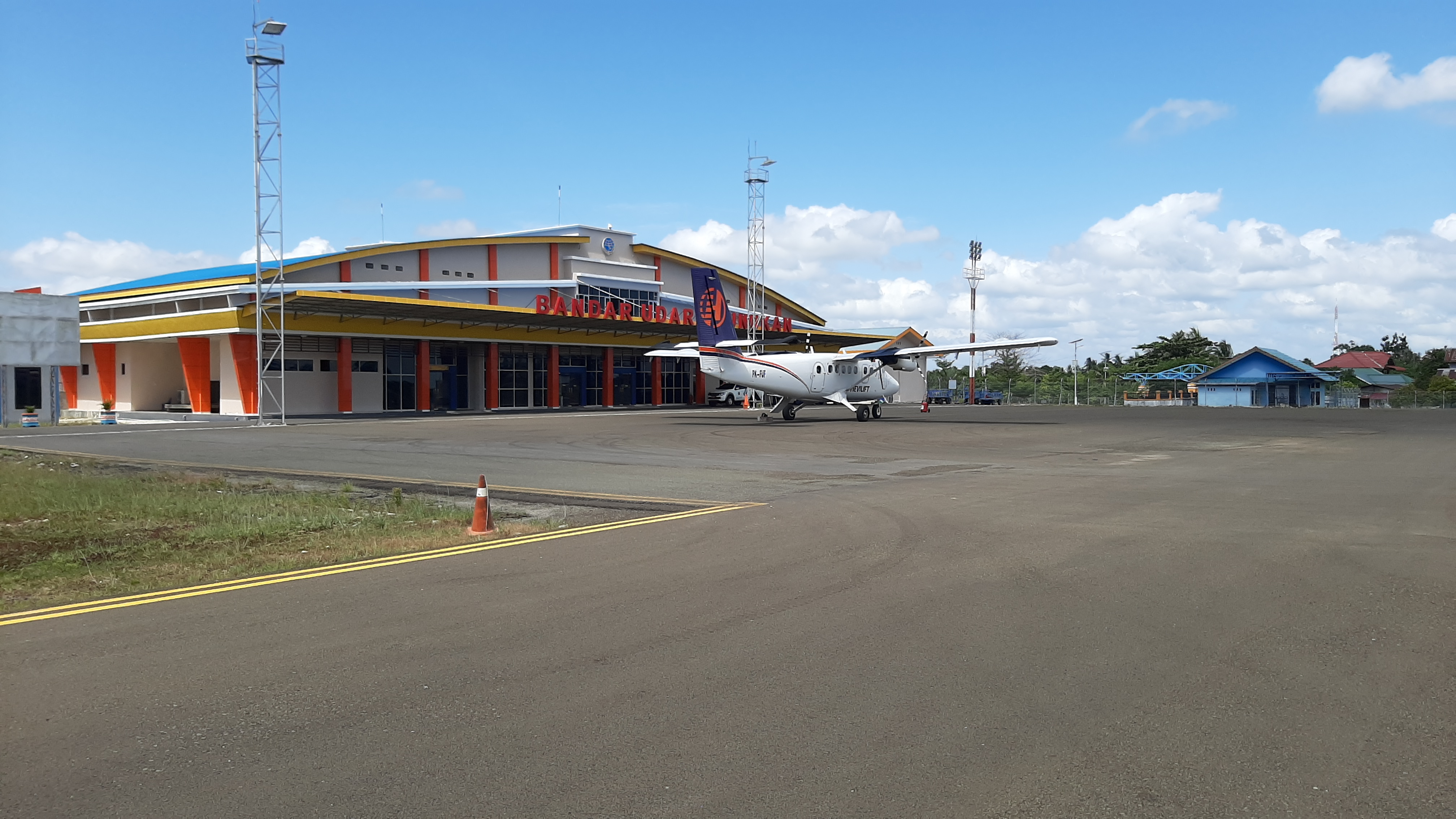
A Hevilift Indonesia De Havilland Canada DHC-6-300 Twin Otter at Nunukan Airport

Annual passenger numbers and aircraft statistics
Year	Passengers handled	Passenger % change	Cargo (tonnes)	Cargo % change	Aircraft movements	Aircraft % change
2006	67,032	Steady	190.59	Steady	2,542	Steady
2007	49,041	▼26.8	104.10	▼45.4	2,100	▼17.4
2008	N/A	Steady	N/A	Steady	N/A	Steady
2009	49,805	Steady	145.33	Steady	2,778	Steady
2010	51,647	▲3.7	101.69	▼30.0	2,706	▼2.6
2011	50,660	▼1.9	154.70	▲52.1	3,562	▲31.6
2012	44,034	▼13.1	137.39	▼11.2	3,145	▼11.7
2013	53,597	▲21.7	143.97	▲4.8	3,556	▲13.1
2014	39,837	▼25.7	119.15	▼17.2	2,222	▼37.5
2015	50,018	▲25.6	169.11	▲41.9	3,031	▲36.4
2016	50,102	▲0.2	343.59	▲103.2	3,363	▲11.0
2017	26,798	▼46.5	300.74	▼12.5	2,091	▼37.8
2018	21,527	▼19.7	165.64	▼44.9	1,511	▼27.7
2019	40,982	▲90.4	21.38	▼87.1	2,305	▲52.5
2020	11,975	▼70.8	81.08	▲279.2	1,263	▼45.2
2021	7,508	▼37.3	37.04	▼54.3	1,630	▲29.1
2022	6,139	▼18.2	44.09	▲19.0	1,026	▼37.1
2023	9,183	▲49.6	17.54	▼60.2	1,427	▲39.1
2024	8,532	▼7.1	32.03	▲82.6	1,225	▼14.2
^{Source: DGCA, BPS}
