= Tulin Onsoi =

- District
- Interactive map of Tulin Onsoi
- Country: Indonesia
- Province: North Kalimantan
- Regency: Nunukan

Tulin Onsoi is a district located in Nunukan Regency, North Kalimantan, Indonesia. Positioned in the northern part of the province, Tulin Onsoi lies close to the border with Malaysia, contributing to its strategic significance in regional trade and cultural exchange. The district is characterized by its diverse landscapes, which include forested areas, rivers, and mountainous terrain, reflecting the natural environment resources of North Kalimantan.

== Demographics ==
The population of Tulin Onsoi consists of various tribes and ethnicities, with the majority of the population being Dayaks as well as migrants from other parts of Indonesia. The local communities primarily engage in agriculture, fishing, and trading, reflecting the district's economic activities and traditional livelihoods.

== Economy ==
The economy of Tulin Onsoi is largely based on agriculture, with local residents cultivating crops such as rice, maize, and various vegetables. Fishing and small-scale trading also play significant roles in the district's economy. The presence of natural resources and its proximity to border trade routes contribute to the economic activities in the area.

== Culture and Society ==
Tulin Onsoi has a cultural heritage influenced by the Dayak people who are the indigenous people of the region. Festivals, ceremonies, and local arts are integral to the social fabric of the community. The culture in Tulin Onsoi reflects the rich traditions of the Dayak people that have existed for a long time, although each village or region may have variations in their cultural practices. The district's cultural landscape is shaped by its history and the interaction between indigenous cultures (Dayaks) and external influences.

== Infrastructure and Development ==
Infrastructure in Tulin Onsoi includes roads, schools, and healthcare facilities, though development levels may vary between rural and more populated areas. The district is focused on improving its infrastructure to enhance connectivity and access to essential services for its residents.

== Challenges and Opportunities ==
Tulin Onsoi faces challenges typical of remote districts, including infrastructure development, access to services, and economic diversification. However, its strategic location and natural resources present opportunities for growth and regional integration, particularly in trade and sustainable development initiatives.
