= Nunukan Island =

Island in Indonesia

Native name: Pulau Nunukan
- Interactive map of Nunukan Island

Geography
- Location: North Kalimantan
- Coordinates: 4°3′34″N 117°40′1″E
- Archipelago: Kalimantan
- Area: 226 km^{2} (87 sq mi)

Administration
- Indonesia
- Province: North Kalimantan
- Largest settlement: Nunukan

Demographics
- Population: 109,773
- Pop. density: 485/km^{2} (1256/sq mi)

Nunukan is an island within the Nunukan Regency in North Kalimantan Province of Indonesia. There are four villages on the island: West Nunukan, East Nunukan, North Nunukan, and Sebuku. These have a combined population of 27,874.

== See also ==
- List of islands of Indonesia
