= Krayan =

- District
- Location within Borneo Location within Indonesia
- Coordinates: 3°54′41″N 115°41′53″E
- Country: Indonesia
- Province: Kalimantan
- Regency: Nunukan Regency

Area
  - Total: 183.474 km^{2} (70.840 sq mi)
- Time zone: UTC+8 (Central Indonesian Time)

Krayan is a district in Nunukan Regency, North Kalimantan, Indonesia.

It is located on the west side of Nunukan Regency and borders the state of Sabah and Sarawak in Malaysia. The district consists of 65 villages, while the main town is Long Bawan. The population is estimated to be 6,824 in 2014, and the majority are of the Lundayeh ethnic group.

Due to the remote location, the district is usually accessible via air, that is, from Nunukan Airport to Juvai Semaring Airport in Long Bawan.

== Economy ==
The district is renowned to be a major rice producer in Nunukan regency, specifically of a variety called Adan rice, and is marketed widely in nearby Malaysia and Brunei. The district also produces mountain salts, collected from salt springs located in the district.

Some part of the Kayan Mentarang National Park area is located in this district.

== Climate ==
Climate data for Long Bawan (Juvai Semaring Airport, 2002–2020)
Month	Jan	Feb	Mar	Apr	May	Jun	Jul	Aug	Sep	Oct	Nov	Dec	Year
Mean daily maximum °C (°F)	26.8 (80.2)	27.4 (81.3)	27.7 (81.9)	28.1 (82.6)	28.3 (82.9)	27.7 (81.9)	27.5 (81.5)	27.8 (82.0)	27.7 (81.9)	27.3 (81.1)	27.5 (81.5)	27.2 (81.0)	27.6 (81.6)
Daily mean °C (°F)	22.9 (73.2)	23.6 (74.5)	23.6 (74.5)	24.0 (75.2)	24.1 (75.4)	23.5 (74.3)	23.2 (73.8)	23.3 (73.9)	23.3 (73.9)	23.3 (73.9)	23.7 (74.7)	23.3 (73.9)	23.5 (74.3)
Mean daily minimum °C (°F)	19.1 (66.4)	19.0 (66.2)	19.6 (67.3)	20.0 (68.0)	19.9 (67.8)	19.4 (66.9)	19.0 (66.2)	18.8 (65.8)	19.0 (66.2)	19.3 (66.7)	19.9 (67.8)	19.4 (66.9)	19.4 (66.9)
Average precipitation mm (inches)	227.0 (8.94)	150.9 (5.94)	175.1 (6.89)	235.9 (9.29)	253.4 (9.98)	234.1 (9.22)	248.8 (9.80)	172.7 (6.80)	174.1 (6.85)	224.7 (8.85)	228.8 (9.01)	204.6 (8.06)	2,530.1 (99.63)
Average precipitation days	15.6	11.8	14.5	15.8	18.0	15.2	16.4	15.3	14.7	15.5	18.5	15.9	187.2
Source: Meteomanz
