= Malinau Regency =

Regency in North Kalimantan, Indonesia

- Regency
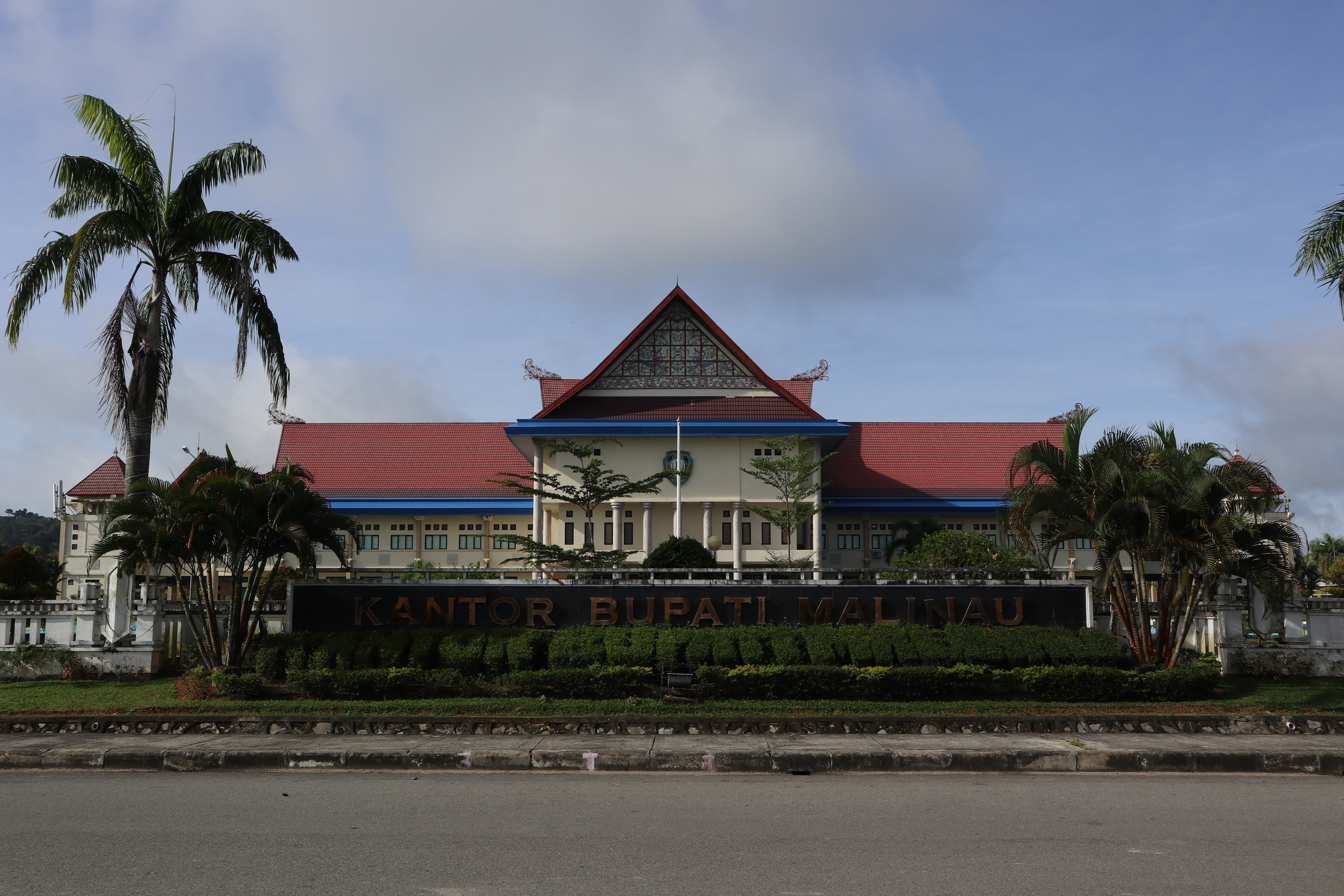
- Regent office of Malinau

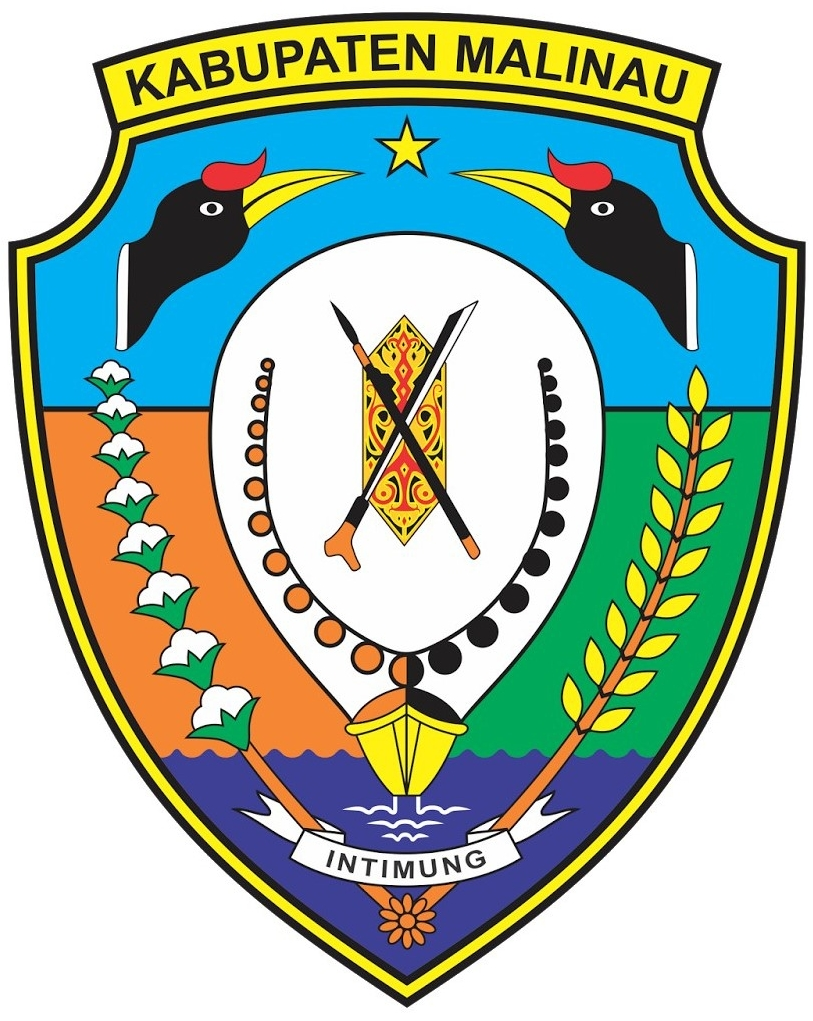
- Coat of arms
- Motto: Intimung
- Location of Malinau Regency in North Kalimantan

- Location in Borneo Malinau Regency (Indonesia)
- Coordinates: 3°29′0″N 115°42′0″E
- Country: Indonesia
- Province: North Kalimantan

Government
  - Regent: Wempi W. Mawa
  - Vice Regent: Jakaria

Area
  - Total: 38,973.56 km^{2} (15,047.78 sq mi)

Population (mid 2024 estimate)
  - Total: 87,582
  - Density: 2.2472/km^{2} (5.8203/sq mi)
- Time zone: UTC+8 (Central Indonesian Time)
- Area code: +62 553
- HDI (2019): ▲0.721 (High)
- Website: malinau.go.id

Malinau Regency is a regency of North Kalimantan Province in Indonesia. It was created on 4 October 1999 from the western districts of Bulungan Regency. The administrative centre is the town of Malinau. The regency is home to the Kayan Mentarang National Park. It covers an area of 38,973.56 km^{2}, and had a population of 62,423 at the 2010 Census and 82,510 at the 2020 Census; the official estimate as at mid 2024 was 87,582. It is the regency with the largest area in the province (containing over 55% of the provincial area), as well as the least densely populated. Other than that, Malinau is the only regency in North Kalimantan that is predominantly Protestant and the second most-developed region in North Kalimantan after Tarakan in terms of Human Development Index.

== History ==
Malinau was originally a residential area inhabited by the Tidung ethnic group. Based on information from Tidung community leaders, the name Malinau originated when the Dutch settled an area formerly known as Selamban. At the time Selamban was inhabited by the Tidung Tribe, while across the Kabiran river the village Pelita Canaan was inhabited by the Dayak Abai tribe. When the Dutch arrived in Selamban they met a group of Abai who were harvesting sago from the sago palm, and asked the name of the river that ran between the two villages. The Abai did not understand the questions, and assumed the Dutch wanted to know what they were working on. One of the Abai said "Mal Inau" which means harvesting sago in the local Abai language; "mal" meaning making, while "inau" means tree. Thus the name Malinau was born. A map of the area made during the colonial period called the local river "the Malinau", and the area has been known as Malinau since.

As people migrated into Selamban, it eventually grew much larger and became a town, renamed Malinau. When Bulungan Regency was divided on 4 October 1999, Malinau became the administrative centre of the newly formed Malinau Regency. In December 2012, Malinau Regency became part of the new province of North Kalimantan.

== Geography ==
Malinau borders Nunukan Regency in the north, Tana Tidung, Bulungan, and Berau regencies in the east, East Kutai, Kutai Kartanegara, and West Kutai regencies in the south, and the Malaysian state of Sabah in the west. From its 38,973.56 square kilometres of area, Kayan Mentarang National Park consists of 24.88% of the total area of the regency. Other than that, another 16.97% of the regency is protected forest, and 49.69% is production forest. Altitude in Malinau varies between altitude of 0 to 2,000 metres above sea level with slope between 0% to 40%. Human settlement and ricefields are mostly found across the regency with a gradient of 3% to 15%. The regency is considered located at a relatively high altitude compared to its neighbouring regions.

Soil composition in the region is mostly ultisol, inceptisol, entisol, and podzol and most of them are of old formation. The majority of soil composition in the region is considered infertile and unsuitable for large-scale farming. However, there is also a significant area dominated by alluvium soil which is mostly found at lower altitudes between 15 and 25 metres above sea level.

As with most region in Indonesia, the climate is tropical with high humidity. Annual rainfall is between 2,500 and more than 4,000 millimeters. Average temperature sits on 26 Celsius with slight variation, between 5 and 7 degrees, between day and night temperature. The coldest period is between November and January while highest average temperature is on April.

== Governance ==
=== Administrative districts ===
As at the 2010 Census, the regency was divided into twelve districts (kecamatan), districts (kecamatan), but three additional districts were subsequently created by splitting off from existing districts. The fifteen districts are tabulated below with their areas and their populations at the 2010 Census and the 2020 Census, together with the official estimates as at mid 2024. The table includes the locations of the district administrative centres, the number of villages (all classed as rural desa) in each district, and its post code.

Kode Wilayah	Name of District (kecamatan)	Area in km^{2}	Pop'n Census 2010	Pop'n Census 2020	Pop'n Estimate mid 2024	Admin centre	No. of villages	Post code
65.02.09	Sungai Boh	2,801.51	2,148	2,357	2,539	Mahak Baru	6	77574
65.02.10	Kayan Selatan (South Kayan)	2,471.50	1,711	1,982	1,995	Long Ampung	5	77573
65.02.05	Kayan Hulu (Upper Kayan)	735.40	2,535	2,432	2,502	Long Nawang	5	77572
65.02.04	Kayan Hilir (Lower Kayan)	11,863.19	1,352	1,484	1,600	Data Dian	5	77571
65.02.03	Pujungan	6,515.59	1,800	1,750	2,000	Long Pujungan	9	77563
65.02.11	Bahau Hulu (Upper Bahau)	3,103.38	1,460	1,406	1,445	Long Alango	6	77562
65.02.15	Sungai Tubu (Tubu River)	2,243.78	^{(a)}	875	1,005	Long Pada	5	77556
65.02.14	Malinau Selatan Hulu (Upper South Malinau)	2,171.21	^{(a)}	2,452	2,823	Metut	8	77553
65.02.06	Malinau Selatan (South Malinau)	1,154.79	7,999	5,479	5,609	Long Loreh	9	77551
65.02.13	Malinau Selatan Hilir (Lower South Malinau)	572.20	^{(a)}	2,872	3,106	Setarap	8	77552
65.02.01	Mentarang	535.15	5,291	5,909	5,794	Pulau Sapi	9	77555
65.02.12	Mentarang Hulu (Upper Mentarang)	2,807.20	756	971	1,913	Long Berang	7	77155
65.02.07	Malinau Utara (North Malinau)	1,091.18	10,124	14,671	16,066	Malinau Seberang	12	77557
65.02.08	Malinau Barat (West Malinau)	765.41	8,157	11,245	11,960	Tanjung Lapang	9	77554
65.02.02	Malinau Kota (Malinau town)	142.07	12,459	26,625	27,225	Malinau Kota	6	77550
	Totals	38,973.56	62,580	82,510	87,582	Malinau Kota	109	

Note: (a) the 2010 populations of these three new districts are included in the figures for the districts from which they were cut out.

=== Local government ===
Malinau Regency is a second-level administrative division equivalent to city. As a regency, it is headed by a regent who is elected democratically. Meanwhile, head of districts are appointed directly by the regent with the recommendation of the regency secretary. Executive power lies with the regent and vice regent, while legislative function is exercised by the regency's parliament.

=== Politics ===
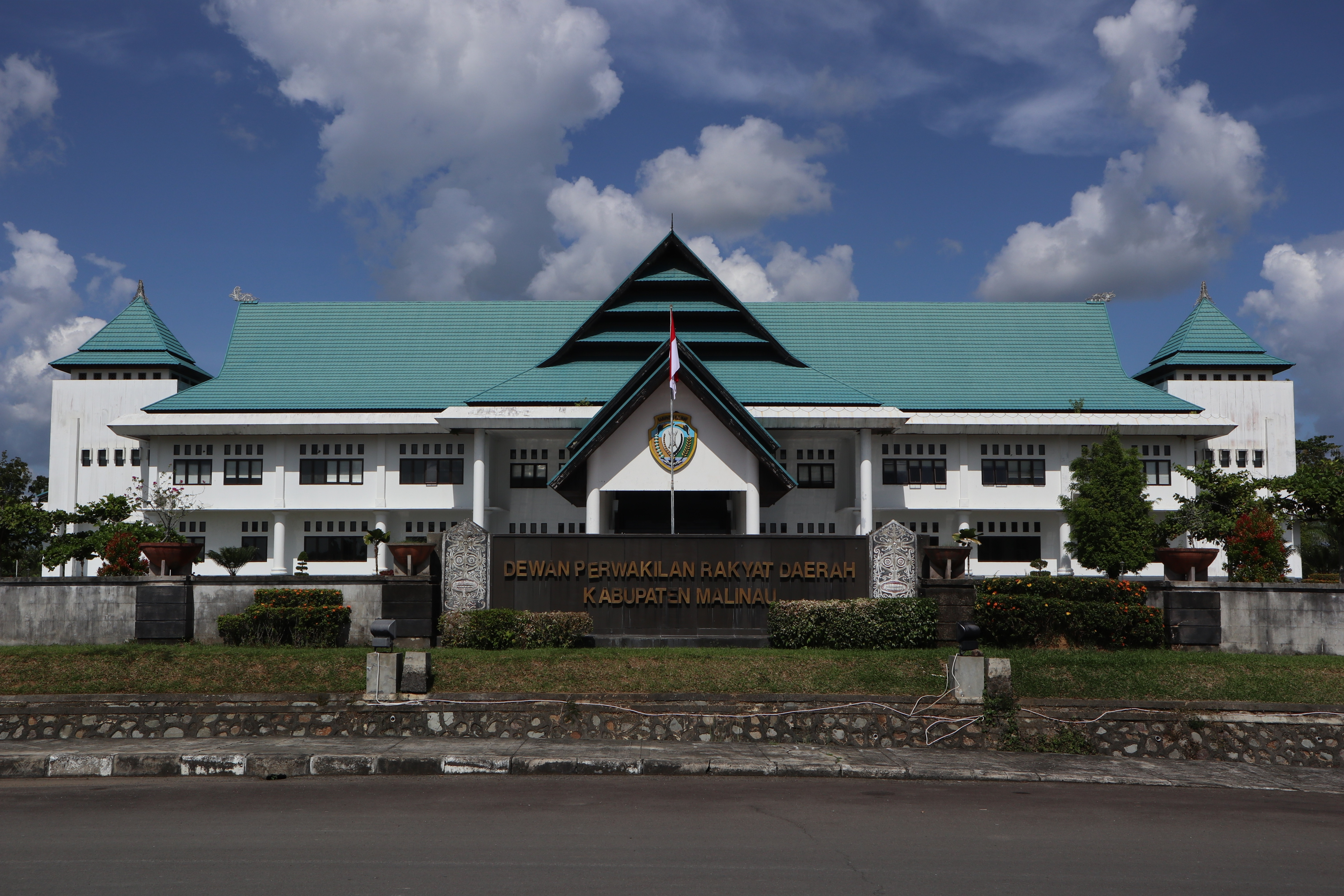
Parliament building of Malinau Regency

Malinau Regency is part of the 3rd North Kalimantan electoral district, which has 4 out of 35 representatives in the provincial parliament. On local level, the regency is divided into two electoral districts that in total have 20 representatives. Last election was in 2019 and the next one would be in 2024.

Electoral district	Region	Representatives
Malinau 1st	Malinau Kota, North Malinau, Mentarang, Mentarang Hulu, and Sungai Tubu District	12
Malinau 2nd	West Malinau, South Malinau, South Malinau Hilir, South Malinau Hulu, Kayan Hilir, Kayan Hulu, South Kayan, Bahau Hulu, Pujungan, and Sungai Boh District	8
Total		20

== Economy ==
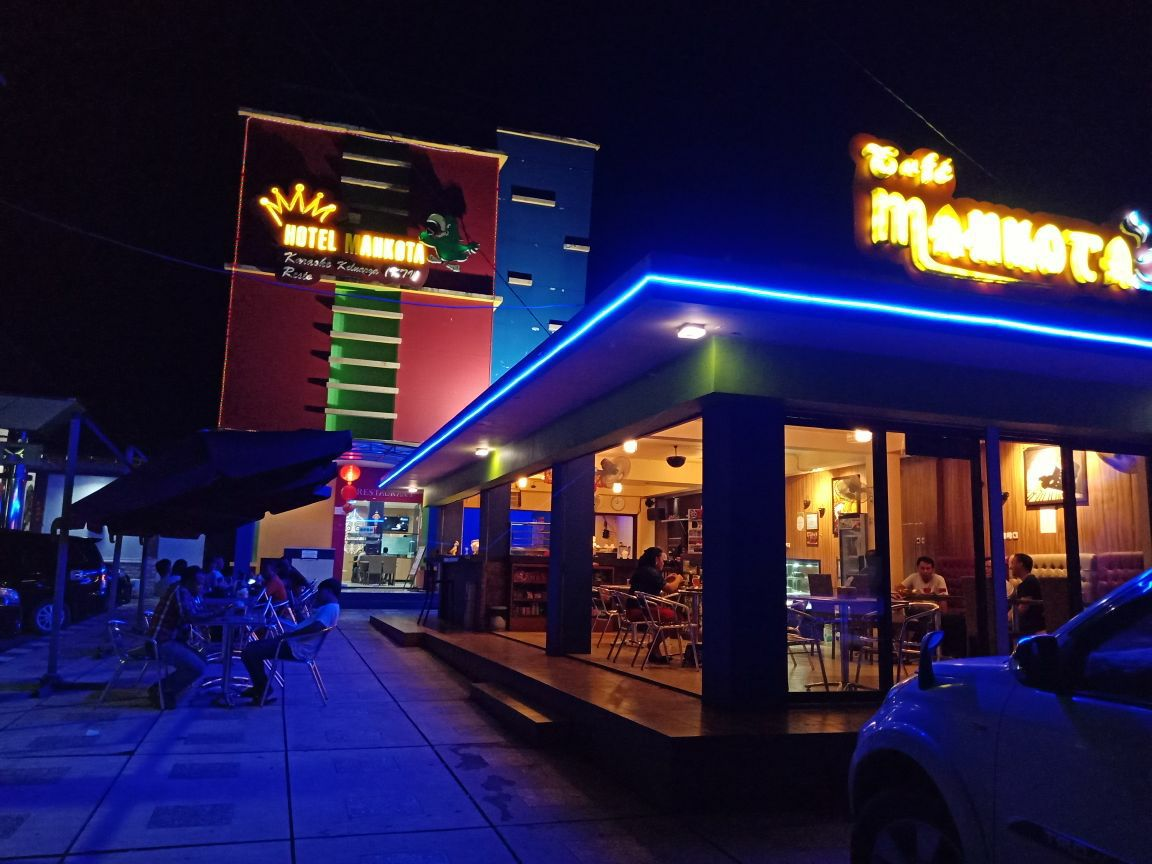
Activity on a cafe in Malinau Kota at night. Local government have been promoting restaurant and service sector to reduce dependency to mining.

Economy of the regency is dominated by mining industry, which consist of 48.29% of its gross regional product. Second largest sector is construction with figure of 17.19%, followed by agriculture with 11.40%, and trade with 4.39%. However, mining especially coal has been declining in terms of value, shown by decrease of 4.61% on 2020 and mining in general with figure of decrease 3.55% on the same year. On the same year, the economic growth in the regency reached decrease of 0.62%. The fastest growing sector in 2020 was electricity and gas with 13.61%, followed by healthcare and social sector with 10.66% increase.

In 2020, the regency produces total of 985 tons of various vegetables and 3,209 tons of various fruits. The most populous livestock in the regency is chicken with more than 700,000 followed by pig with population of 12,015, ducks with population of 3,509, and cattle with population of 1,940.

The regency is visited by 14,555 domestic tourists and 39 foreign tourists in 2020. 58% of tourist destination is nature due to presence of national park. There are 17 registered hotels in the regency and 17 registered restaurants. Number of restaurants including unregistered one could be higher. Service sector has been growing helped with regency government aiming at reducing dependency on mining and resource extraction and promoting tourism & restaurant sector. However, on late 2020 five hotels closed operation because of COVID-19 pandemic.

Poverty rate in 2020 was 6.63%.

== Demographics ==
Religion in Malinau Regency (June 2021)
1. Protestant (60.0%)
2. Muslim (31.6%)
3. Roman Catholic (7.93%)
4. Hindu (0.31%)
5. Buddha (0.01%)

Population growth in 2020 was 2.71% with sex ratio of 115, means there are 115 male for every 100 female population. 32.27% of regency's population live on its regency seat, Malinau Kota district. As with most of regions in Indonesia, its population is dominated by reproductive age above 15 years which consist of 69.01% of population. District with highest population growth is North Malinau with figure of 3.66% in 2020 and the lowest is South Malinau with population decreased 3.6% on the same year. The most dense district is Malinau Kota, with density of 187.41 people per square kilometer and the least dense is Kayan Hilir with density of 0.13 per square kilometer. From the population, 41,300 people considered economically active by Statistics Indonesia. Dominant religion in the regency is Protestant which sits around 60% of the population followed by minority of Muslim, Catholic, and Buddhist.

== Infrastructure ==
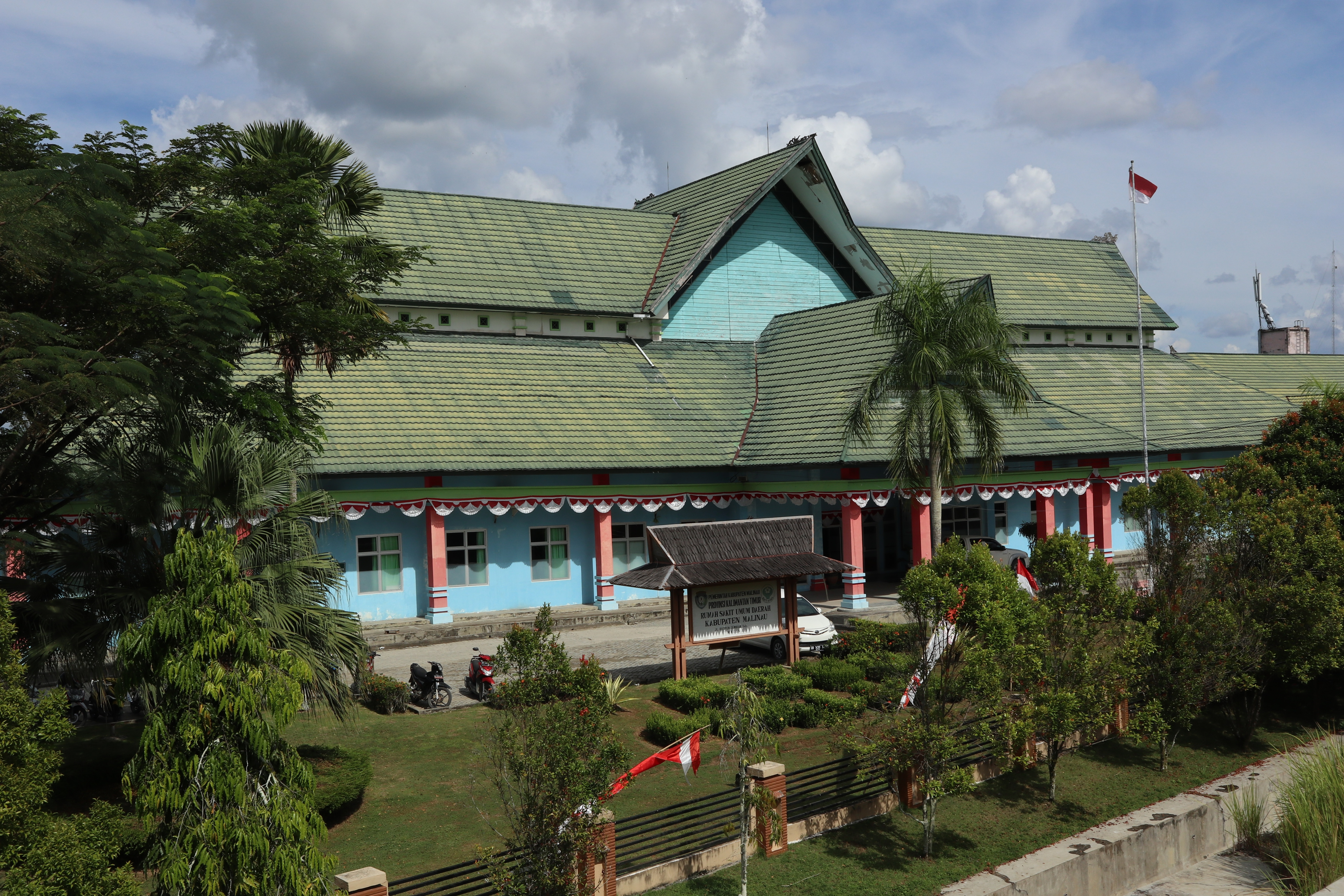
Malinau Regional Hospital

There are exactly 36 kindergartens, 108 elementary schools, 40 junior high schools, 19 senior high schools, in addition to 4 vocational high schools. There is only one higher education institution in the regency, which is Malinau Polytech, located in North Malinau district. It is a private institution established in 2007 and offers diplomas in business administration, accounting, plantation cultivation, and information. School participation rate was 93.28% in 2020 and literacy rate was 98.34% on the same year.

On healthcare facilities, there are three hospitals, one polyclinic, 97 puskesmas, and 9 pharmacies. Malinau Regional Hospital, owned by the regency government, is the main hospital and the largest in the regency, located in North Malinau District. It is considered a C-class hospital by Ministry of Health. In addition, the regency has 123 healthcare centers and 6 operational medical clinics.

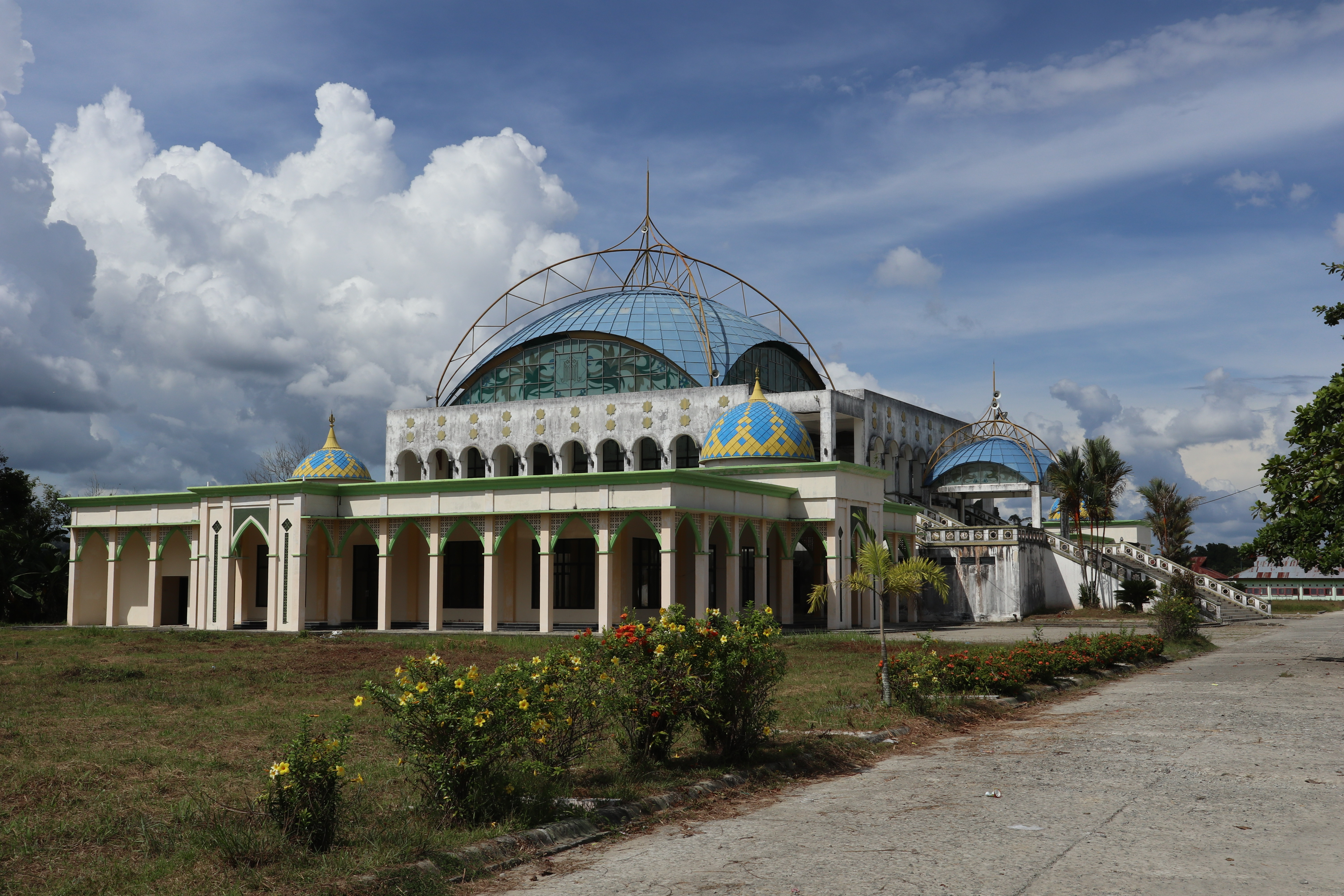
Islamic Center Malinau

There are exactly 59 mosques, 174 Protestant churches, 35 Catholic churches, a Balinese temple, and a Chinese Buddhist temple. The only Balinese Hindu temple in the regency is named Pura Agung Femung Jagatnatha and located in Malinau Kota district. It is mostly used by Balinese migrants.

The length of roads in the regency is 1,043.20 kilometres, out of which only 167.42 kilometres have been sealed and paved. Malinau Kota, the regency seat and most populous district, is connected by Perum DAMRI bus to Tanjung Selor and Nunukan Regency. The regency is served by Robert Atty Bessing Airport, which seen 1,051 departures and 959 arrivals in 2020 with more than 25,000 passengers both arrived and departed. Due to abundance of navigable river and lack of adequate road infrastructure, speedboat through river is one of main transportation in the regency which served movement of around 48,975 people in 2020. However, this is sharp decrease from previous figure of 116,032 in 2019. In 2016, most of the regency have access to 4G signal. As with many regions in Indonesia, the only fiber optic service provider in the regency is IndiHome which is state-owned under Telkom Indonesia.

== See also ==
- List of regencies and cities of Indonesia
