= Nunukan Regency =

Regency in North Kalimantan, Indonesia

Nunukan Regency Kabupaten Nunukan
- Regency
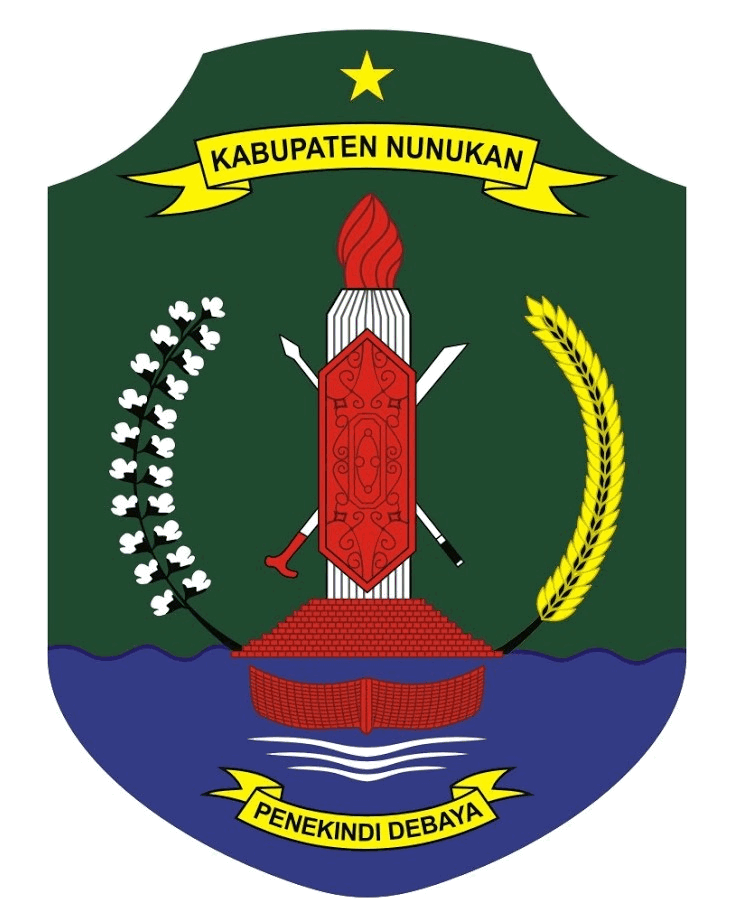
- Coat of arms
- Motto: Penekindi Debaya (Building Regions)
- Location within North Kalimantan

- Location in Kalimantan and Indonesia Nunukan Regency (Indonesia)
- Coordinates: 4°3′34″N 117°40′1″E
- Country: Indonesia
- Province: North Kalimantan
- Capital: Nunukan

Government
  - Regent: Irwan Sabri
  - Vice Regent: Hermanus

Area
  - Total: 14,247.50 km^{2} (5,500.99 sq mi)

Population (mid 2024 estimate)
  - Total: 227,460
  - Density: 15.965/km^{2} (41.349/sq mi)
- Time zone: UTC+8 (ICST)
- Area code: (+62) 556
- Website: nunukankab.go.id

Nunukan Regency is a regency of North Kalimantan Province in Indonesia. It was created on 4 October 1999 from the northern districts of Bulungan Regency. Nunukan Regency shares international borders with the Malaysian states of Sabah to the north and Sarawak to the west, and inter-regency borders with Tana Tidung Regency and Malinau Regency to the south, as well as the coastal city of Tarakan in the east. The regency covers an area of 14,247.50 km^{2} and it had a population of 140,841 at the 2010 census and 199,090 at the 2020 census; the official estimate as at mid 2024 was 227,460 (comprising 119,672 males and 107,788 females).

Nunukan is also the name of an island within this regency. It has an area of 226 km^{2}. Nunukan town, the capital of the regency, is located on Nunukan Island, which comprises the insular section of Nunukan District (which also includes part of the 'mainland' of Kalimantan) and the whole of the separate Nunukan Selatan District. It is a major port for ferry crossings to Tawau in Sabah state, Malaysia.

North of Nunukan Island is Sebatik Island, which is split in two by a straight east-west line across the centre of the island. The northern part lies in Malaysia and the southern half within Indonesia. The Indonesian portion has an area of 246.61 km^{2} and had a population of 47,571 at the 2020 census, and 55,870 according the mid 2024 estimates, comprising five of the regency's districts.

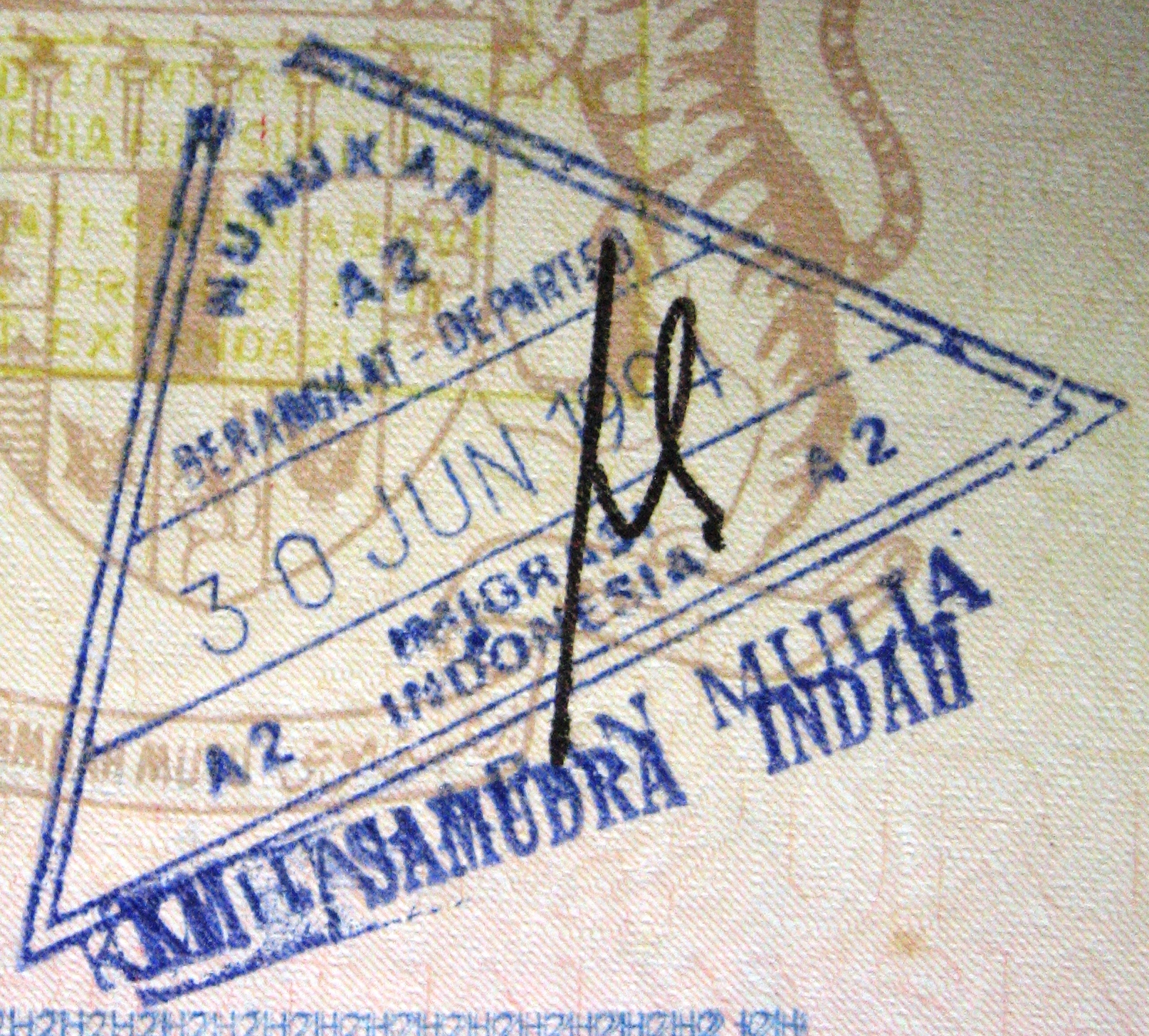
Indonesian exit stamp from Nunukan.

== Demographics ==
=== Ethnicity ===
- Bugis
- Tidung
- Bajau people
- Murut people
- Lun Bawang
- Tausug
- Penan
- Kelabit
- Kedayan
- Orang Ulu
- Kenyah
- Kayan
- Malays

=== Religion ===
Religion in Nunukan Religion (June 2021)
1. Muslim (72.5%)
2. Protestantism (19.5%)
3. Roman Catholic (7.40%)
4. Buddhism (0.13%)
5. Hinduism (0.06%)
6. Confucianism (0.04%)

== Administrative districts ==
At the 2010 census, the regency was divided into nine districts (kecamatan), but subsequently another twelve new districts have been created by the division of existing regencies. All these are tabulated below with their areas and their populations at the 2010 census and the 2020 census, together with the official estimates as at mid 2024. The table also includes the locations of the district administrative centres, the number of administrative villages in each district (a total of 232 rural desa and 8 urban kelurahan - the latter comprising 4 each in Nunukan District and Nunukan Selatan District), and its postal codes.

Kode Wilayah	Name of District (kecamatan)	Area in km^{2}	Pop'n census 2010	Pop'n census 2020	Pop'n estimate mid 2024	Admin centre	No. of villages	Post codes
65.03.07	Krayan Selatan (South Krayan)	760.24	2,243	1,448	1,511	Long Layu	13	77454
65.03.17	Krayan Tengah (Central Krayan)	997.42	^{(a)}	1,427	1,124	Binuang	11	77458
65.03.05	Krayan ^{(a)}	254.35	7,240	3,458	3,710	Long Bawan	23	77456
65.03.18	Krayan Timur (East Krayan)	1,273.17	^{(a)}	1,597	1,609	Long Umung	17	77459
65.03.19	Krayan Barat (West Krayan)	309.22	^{(a)}	2,944	3,132	Lembudud	25	77455
Totals for	Apokayan region	3,594.40	9,483	10,874	11,086		89	
65.03.02	Nunukan ^{(e)}	564.50	53,621	64,241	73,095	Nunukan Barat	5	77482
65.03.09	Nunukan Selatan ^{(f)} (South Nunukan)	181.77	12,260	21,588	27,781	Nunukan Selatan	4	77480
Totals for	Nunukan island	746.27	65,881	85,829	100,876		9	
65.03.08	Sebatik Barat ^{(g)} (West Sebatik)	93.27	10,384	10,903	14,086	Binalawan	4	77486
65.03.01	Sebatik ^{(g)}	51.07	22,173	6,453	7,781	Tanjung Karang	4	77483
65.03.10	Sebatik Timur (East Sebatik)	39.17	^{(h)}	14,171	15,791	Sungai Nyamuk	4	77488
65.03.12	Sebatik Tengah (Central Sebatik)	47.71	^{(h)}	8,250	9,585	Aji Kuning	4	77487
65.03.11	Sebatik Utara (North Sebatik)	15.39	^{(h)}	7,794	8,627	Pancang	3	77489
Totals for	Sebatik island	246.61	32,557	47,571	55,870		19	
65.03.15	Lumbis Ogong	1,628.66	^{(b)}	3,079	3,256	Samunti	26	77450
65.03.21	Lumbis Pansiangan	964.42	^{(b)}	1,844	1,697	Labang	13	77450
65.02.20	Lumbis Hulu (Upper Lumbis)	763.93	^{(b)}	773	870	Tantu Libing	10	77450
65.03.04	Lumbis	290.23	9,883	4,947	6,990	Mansalong	28	77457
65.03.16	Sembakung Atulai	277.72	^{(c)}	2,771	3,470	Saduman	10	77452
65.03.03	Sembakung	1,764.94	8,138	6,673	7,076	Atap	10	77453
65.03.06	Sebuku	1,608.48	14,899	11,936	12,858	Pembeliangan	10	77481
65.03.14	Tulin Onsoi	1,513.36	^{(d)}	10,915	12,082	Sekikilan	12	77485
65.03.13	Sei Menggaris	850.48	^{(d)}	10,275	11,329	Srinanti	4	77484
	Totals	14,247.50	140,841	199,090	227,460	Nunukan	240	

Notes: (a) the 2010 population figures given for Krayan District and Krayan Selatan District include the populations of the three most recently created districts (Krayan Selatan District included the new Krayan Tengah District, while Krayan District included the new Krayan Timur and Krayan Barat Districts. The Apokayan region (i.e. all the first five districts listed above) comprises the entire western section of the Regency, separated from Malaysia by the meandering Kayan River.
(b) the 2010 populations of Lumbis Ogong District, Lumbis Pansiangan District and Lumbis Hulu District are included in the figure for Lumbis District, from which they were split.
(c) the 2010 population of Sembakung Atulai District is included in the figure for Sembakung District, from which it was split.
(d) the 2010 populations of Tulin Onsoi District and Sei Menggaris District are included in the figure for Sebuku District, from which they were split.
(e) Nunukan District comprises the western half of Nunukan Island (including the town of Nunukan), together with adjacent areas on the 'mainland' of Kalimantan. It consists of 4 kelurahan (Nunukan Barat, Nunukan Tengah, Nunukan Timur and Nunukan Utara) and the desa of Binusan.
(f) Nunukan Selatan District comprises the eastern half of Nunukan Island. It consists of 4 kelurahan (Mansapa, Nunukan Selatan, Selisun and Tanjung Harapan).
(g) Sebatik District comprises a southeast portion of Sebatik Island, while Sebatik Barat District comprises a southwest portion (the northern half of this island is part of Malaysian North Borneo, as the international boundary divides this island in two).
(h) Since 2010, three additional districts have been created on (the Indonesian portion of) Sebatik Island - Sebatik Timur, Sebatik Tengah and Sebatik Utara - by the division of existing districts. The populations in these districts in 2010 are included with the figures for Sebatik Barat District and Sebatik District.

== Climate ==
Nunukan town, the seat of the regency has a tropical rainforest climate (Af) with moderate rainfall in January and February and heavy rainfall in the remaining months.

Climate data for Nunukan
Month	Jan	Feb	Mar	Apr	May	Jun	Jul	Aug	Sep	Oct	Nov	Dec	Year
Mean daily maximum °C (°F)	29.5 (85.1)	29.5 (85.1)	29.8 (85.6)	30.4 (86.7)	30.7 (87.3)	30.7 (87.3)	30.8 (87.4)	30.9 (87.6)	30.7 (87.3)	30.7 (87.3)	30.4 (86.7)	29.8 (85.6)	30.3 (86.6)
Daily mean °C (°F)	26.1 (79.0)	26.1 (79.0)	26.3 (79.3)	26.8 (80.2)	26.9 (80.4)	26.8 (80.2)	26.8 (80.2)	26.8 (80.2)	26.6 (79.9)	26.7 (80.1)	26.7 (80.1)	26.3 (79.3)	26.6 (79.8)
Mean daily minimum °C (°F)	22.7 (72.9)	22.7 (72.9)	22.9 (73.2)	23.2 (73.8)	23.2 (73.8)	23.0 (73.4)	22.8 (73.0)	22.7 (72.9)	22.6 (72.7)	22.7 (72.9)	23.0 (73.4)	22.9 (73.2)	22.9 (73.2)
Average rainfall mm (inches)	116 (4.6)	123 (4.8)	140 (5.5)	171 (6.7)	236 (9.3)	208 (8.2)	234 (9.2)	237 (9.3)	204 (8.0)	218 (8.6)	218 (8.6)	207 (8.1)	2,312 (90.9)
Source: Climate-Data.org
