= 2025–2026 Indonesian protests =

Series of anti-government protests

- Part of the post-Suharto era in Indonesia and Gen-Z protests in Asia
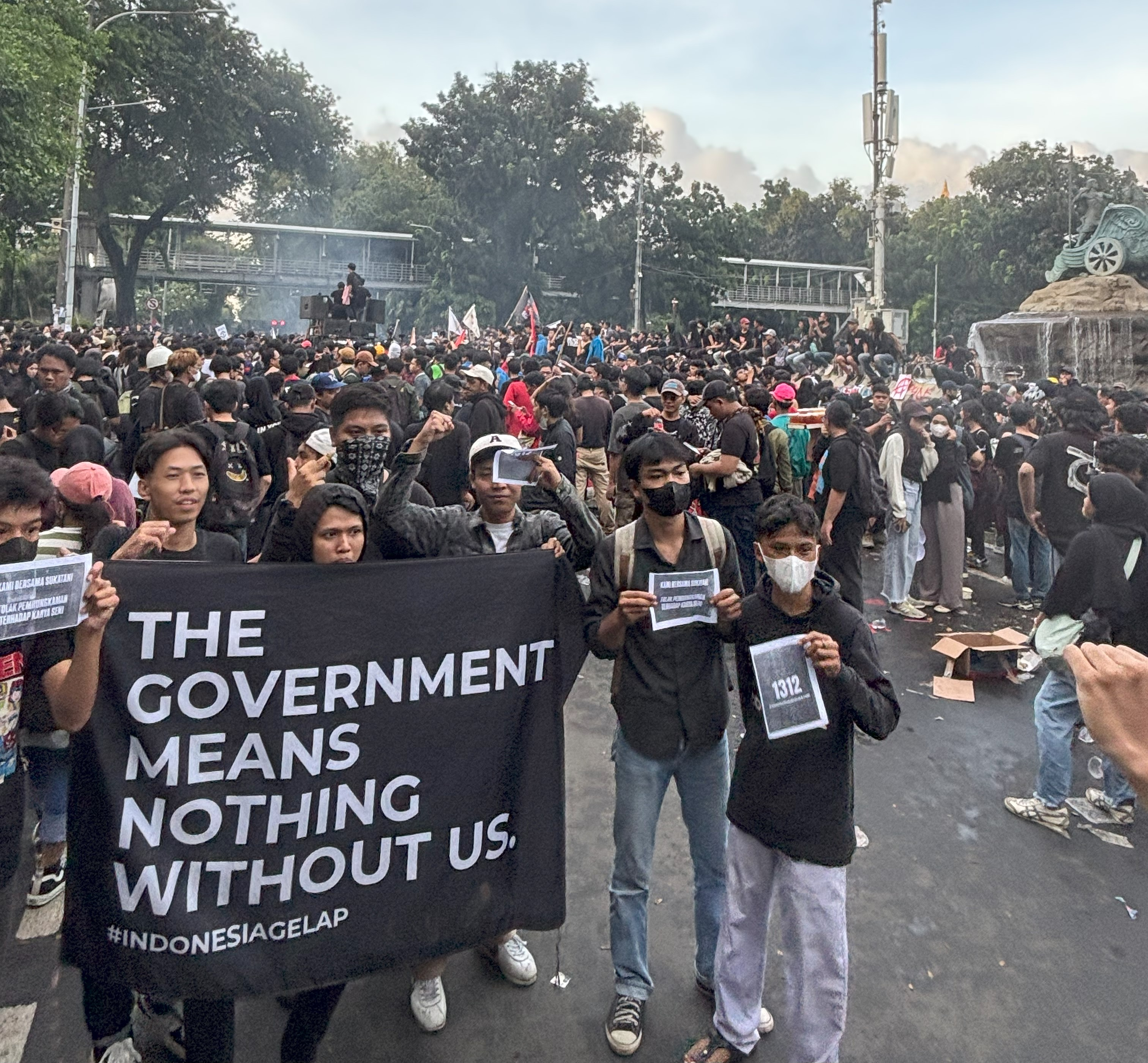
- Protesters near the National Monument, Central Jakarta on 21 February 2025
- Date: 14 February 2025 – Ongoing (1 year, 9 months and 3 days)
- Location: Indonesia (Note: Cities of Banda Aceh, Medan, Padang, Tanjung Pinang, Bengkulu, Palembang, Pangkal Pinang, Bandar Lampung, Jakarta, Bandung, Tasikmalaya, Indramayu, Cirebon, Purwokerto, Semarang, Yogyakarta, Kudus, Surakarta, Kediri, Lamongan, Surabaya, Malang, Bondowoso, Denpasar, Mataram, Kupang, Pontianak, Banjarmasin, Balikpapan, Samarinda, Makassar, Kendari, Manado, Ambon, Wamena, Paniai, and Jambi City) with solidarity protests in the United States, Australia, Malaysia, Germany, and the Netherlands (Note: See overseas)
- Caused by: Rising unemployment and economic hardship; Reports of democratic backsliding, including rising cases of crackdown against freedom of speech; Presidential Instruction Number 1 of 2025; Passing of the 2025 revision of the armed forces law; Police brutality; High tax increases and increased allowances for council members; House of Representatives (DPR) allowance hike; Insensitive statements by House of Representatives members; Food and education cost rise; Mass layoffs; Property tax hike; Food poisoning and corruption controversy from the Free Nutritious Meals programme; Death of Affan Kurniawan by a police tactical vehicle; Rejection of the transmigration program that moves Javanese residents to other islands; Supposed influence of former president Joko Widodo on Prabowo Subianto's government; Diploma controversy of Joko Widodo; Other controversial policies of Prabowo Subianto and Gibran Rakabuming Raka (see background); Public resentment toward government response to 2025 flooding in Sumatra and 2026 wildfires in Kalimantan; Weakening of Indonesian rupiah by 2026; Fuel price hike; Criminalization of youth and student activists
- Goals: See demands
- Methods: Demonstration; Internet activism Student activism Sit-in; Occupation; Vandalism; Riots; Lootings; Boycotts and cancel culture against pro-government figures and celebrities Cacerolazo; Brain drain (see #KaburAjaDulu)
- Status: Ongoing: Resignation of vice president Gibran Rakabuming Raka

Parties
(Indonesia) Protesters (no centralised authority): Students' unions: All-Indonesian Students' Union (BEM SI); Individual students' unions; High school students (Note: See Papua); Online motorcycle taxi drivers; Labour unions; Teacher unions; Other civilians: Civil Society Coalition; Women's groups; People's Voice Alliance; Student-led organizations: Indonesian National Student Movement (GMNI); Muslim Students' Association; Indonesian Muslim Students' Movement (PMII); Students' National Front (FMN); Anarchists (Note: Based on numerous anarchist symbols during the demonstrations. Made prominent appearances during the Labor Day in Indonesia.)	(Indonesia) Government; House of Representatives; Indonesian National Armed Forces; Koopssus; State Intelligence Agency; Indonesian National Police; Mobile Brigade Corps; Samatpa Bhayangkara Corps; Municipal Police; Other parties: Pancasila Youth; Peoples Movement for a New Indonesia; Pro-government counter-protesters

Lead figures
Protesters: no centralised leadership BEM SI: (Indonesia) Herianto Chairman of BEM SI; Supported by: (Indonesia) Rocky Gerung Indonesian activist (until October 2026); (Indonesia) Ferry Irwandi Indonesian activist; (Indonesia) Haris Azhar Indonesian activist; (Indonesia) Febriana Firdaus Indonesian activist	Government: Prabowo Subianto President of Indonesia; Gibran Rakabuming Raka Vice President of Indonesia (until November 2026); Puan Maharani Speaker of the House; Agus Subiyanto Commander of the TNI; Listyo Sigit Prabowo Chief of the POLRI (until October 2026); Suyudi Ario Seto Chief of the POLRI (since October 2026); (Indonesia) Yapto Soerjosoemarno Leader of the Pancasila Youth; Rosario “Hercules” de Marçal Leader of Peoples Movement for a New Indonesia

Number
First phase: 9,722 (Note: Jakarta: 3,000; Kediri: 60; Palembang: 1,000; Semarang: 1,000; Tanjung Pinang: 62; Tasikmalaya: 100; Wamena: 3,500; Yogyakarta: 1,000); Second phase: No data	First phase: 2,610 (Note: Jakarta: 2,460; Tanjung Pinang: 150); Second phase: 6,100 (Note: Jakarta: 5,000; Surabaya: 1,100)

Casualties and losses
9 dead; 66 injured (Note: February 2025: 3 injured; March 2025: 45 injured; August 2025: 2 injured; August 2026: 1 injured; September 2026: 15 injured); 530 arrested (Note: February 2025: 16 arrested; March 2025: 143 arrested; April 2025: 2 arrested; August 2025: 15 arrested; August 2026: 322 arrested; September 2026: 32 arrested); 20+ missing	3 dead; 41 injured (Note: 39 police and TNI personnel; 2 parliament members)
- 18 journalists injured 4 medical officers injured 1 non-protesting civilian injured

Since February 2025, public and student-led anti-government demonstrations have been held throughout several cities in Indonesia.

The first wave of protests were launched on 17 February 2025 by the All-Indonesian Students' Union (BEM SI), together with individual students' unions. According to the central coordinator of BEM SI, Herianto, the alliance had called for protests all over the country on 17 and 18 February (cancelled at Jakarta), while they would hold the protest centrally at Jakarta on 19 (cancelled) and 20 February. The Civil Society Coalition had also called for civilians to participate in demonstrations on 21 February following Friday prayers. BEM SI projected that around 5,000 students would participate in the protests, and they also threatened further actions if the government does not react positively.

The second wave of protests began in March 2025 following the ratification of the newly revised Indonesian National Armed Forces Law, which increased the number of civilian positions that soldiers are allowed to hold, from 10 to 14. Generally, most of the protests were held in front of the buildings of respective legislatures (national or regional), with its participants usually having worn black clothing, marked by the burning of used tires and clashes with policemen. Protests peaked in February and March 2025, but they began to fade since then.

Starting from Pati Regency, Central Java, a third wave of protests erupted around August 10–13, triggered by a proposed 250% increase in land and building taxes (PBB‑P2). The unrest quickly grew, drawing up to 100,000 protesters, with dozens injured. On 25 August, thousands, including students, workers, and activists, marched to the national parliament building in Jakarta, protesting against exorbitant allowances for lawmakers. After an online motorcycle taxi (Indonesian: ojek online) driver was run over by security officers with an armoured vehicle, protesters grew angry. It was the first recorded fatality during the six-month-long protest. In retaliation, the demonstrators attacked two security officers who were near the location, leaving them lying on the road covered in blood. After protesters started getting aggressive, the military became involved to protect malls from looting. Protesters torched and looted the House of Representatives members' houses, including that of Ahmad Sahroni.

== Background ==
The protests occurred as a response over controversial policies by Indonesian president Prabowo Subianto and his vice-president Gibran Rakabuming Raka, which include the Free Nutritious Meals (MBG) programme and the enactment of Presidential Instruction Number 1 of 2025, which led to massive budget cuts, supposedly to fund it.

The nickname #IndonesiaGelap itself originates as a hashtag popular on Twitter (X). According to Beautynesia, the hashtag had been used by more than 760 thousand tweets, but within 24 hours, this number has increased up to 14 million tweets. While according to coordinator of BEM SI, Satria Naufal, it represents "the fears, worries, and well-being of the citizens". Digital research company Jangkara found that during February 2025, the hashtag has received 81% negative sentiment, followed by 13% neutral and 6% positive, based on their analysis on 64,816 comments on X.

== Timeline ==
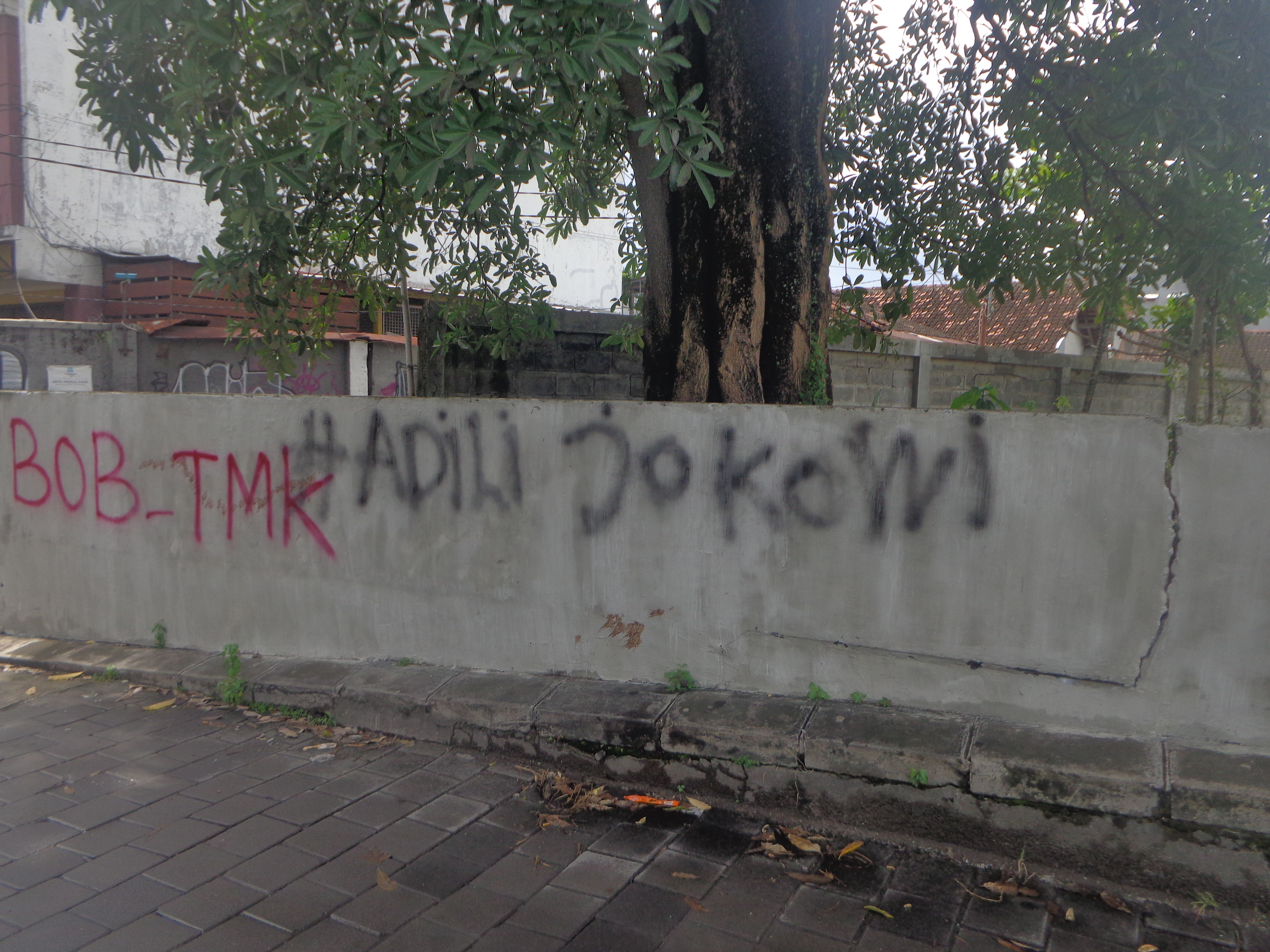
"#Adili Jokowi" graffiti in Janti, Sleman Regency, Special Region of Yogyakarta, 7 March 2025

Presidential Instruction Number 1 of 2025, released on 22 January 2025

=== 2025 ===
==== February ====
The student protests were preceded by a similar anti-government Adili Jokowi ('Try Jokowi') protest, which occurred at Surakarta on 14 February 2025, demanding investigation of cases involving him. However, 10 minutes later, the protesters dispersed after heavy rain. Alongside this, there have been instances of graffiti bearing the inscription Adili Jokowi throughout parts of Java, such as Yogyakarta, Surabaya, and Malang, much of which was later removed by local authorities. Musician Iwan Fals, nonetheless, has criticised this demand and questioned what are his faults in office. Meanwhile, founder of KedaiKOPI, Hendri Satrio, has also doubted the success of this movement, stating that it would be difficult for the Prabowo's government to arrest and bring Jokowi into justice.

Central coordinator of BEM SI, Herianto, claimed that Indonesia "is being led by twin suns", and gave an example regarding ban on sale of 3 kg LPG gas cylinders by small informal retail traders, a policy that was enforced without knowledge of the president Prabowo Subianto and then subsequently repealed. He also claimed that students were disappointed after Prabowo shouted "Long live Jokowi!" during the 17th anniversary of Gerindra Party at Sentul International Convention Center. Prabowo himself has been accused by his opponents and political analysts of being Jokowi's puppet due to his closeness and the former's president influence on his policies. Prabowo denied this accusation multiple times, the most recent being during the same 17th anniversary event of Gerindra Party, which he responded to by saying "Ndasmu!" ("Your head!") with a mocking tone and facial expression. Such reaction attracted criticism from the public as being childish and confrontational towards his opposition.

Meanwhile, during protests on 17 February, Prabowo attended a closed meeting together with his ministers of Red and White Cabinet at Istana Merdeka while discussing various strategic issues such as prevention of online gambling. They were also seen having lunch together. At the same time, all eight fractions of DPR agreed to officially ratify the proposed revision of Mineral and Coal Law in 13th plenary session on 18 February. One of the proposed change to the law was to allow universities and colleges across Indonesia to receive mining permits and become involved in mining. Proponents of this change from the government argued that this will lower cost of tertiary education, while academics and students criticized the change as potentially used to silence universities from participating in activism while worsening ecological damage caused by the mining industry. This proposed change was later dropped when the law was passed on 17 February by the parliament the same day the protests erupted.

==== March ====
In March 2025, protests began to renew after Indonesian National Armed Forces Law underwent revision by the DPR. The important points of this version, include:

- Chapter 3:
  - Armed Forces (TNI), previously subordinated to both the President of Indonesia and Ministry of Defense (Kemhan), is now fully subordinated to Kemhan.
- Chapter 7:
  - Non-war military operations (OMSP) were increased from previous 14 into 16 tasks. The newly added two tasks include protection efforts against cyberattacks, and protection of Indonesian citizens and national interests overseas.
- Chapter 47:
  - The number of civilian positions TNI members are allowed to occupy were increased from previous 10 into 14 positions. Five of them include National Agency for Disaster Countermeasure (BNPB), National Border Management Agency (BNPP), National Counter Terrorism Agency (BNPT), Maritime Security Agency (Bakamla), and Attorney General's Office (Kejagung). The proposal to add Ministry of Marine Affairs and Fisheries (KKP) into this list was shortly abandoned before its ratification.
- Chapter 53:
  - Retirement ages vary by the rank of a soldier:
  - Non-commissioned officers (bintara) and private (tamtama): 55 years
  - Commissioned officers (perwira) up to colonel (kolonel): 58 years
  - One-star high officer (perwira tinggi bintang 1): 60 years
  - Two-star high officer (perwira tinggi bintang 2): 61 years
  - Three-star high officer (perwira tinggi bintang 3): 62 years
  - Four-star high officer (perwira tinggi bintang 4): 63 years, or can be extended twice by a presidential decree

On 19 March, Commission I of DPR and the government agreed to ratify the law next day, and it officially took effect on 20 March during a plenary session. This law caused strong criticism from various parties because it would potentially revive dwifungsi, leading to an online petition calling for repeal of the revision on Change.org (as of 19 March, it has been signed by more than 26,000 people). At the same time, the perception of TNI began to deteriorate following a police raid on cockfighting gamble site incident at Way Kanan, Lampung, which led into deaths of three policemen after being shot by two soldiers and a test-drive car theft, which killed a car salesman after being shot by a Navy sailor at North Aceh, both happened on March 17.

==== April ====
In April 2025, protests continue the second wave with #FreePalestine. The hashtag erupted over Prabowo's plan to evacuate a thousand Palestinians from Gaza to Indonesia. The plan drew the attention of the Majelis Ulama Indonesia (MUI), so that it declared a ban on evacuating victims of the Palestinian conflict in Gaza to Indonesia because it could be interpreted as helping the interests of the Israeli occupation.

In addition, the protests erupted over authenticity of Jokowi's undergraduate diploma after an UGM alumnus, Rismon Hasiholan Sianipar, investigated the authenticity of the diploma.

==== May ====
The protests were accompanied by International Workers' Day.

==== July ====
The country oversaw new controversial policies imposed by the government. The Indonesian Financial Transaction Reports and Analysis Center (PPATK) temporarily blocked 122 million dormant bank accounts (not being used within at least three months), based on the evidences of abuse. However, this policy caused much condemnation leading into its reversal.

Alongside that, a series of anti-transmigration demonstrations were organised by Dayak indigenous communities throughout West Kalimantan, given its potential marginalisation of their lands, resources, and lifestyles. Previously, there were four locations in West Kalimantan that would be designated as destinations for transmigration, namely Rasau Jaya, Gerbang Mas Perkasa, Sekayam Entikong, and Ketunggau Hulu. Following this, the transmigration program into West Kalimantan was terminated by the government, and such protests soon spread into Central Kalimantan and North Kalimantan in the following month.

==== August ====
In early August 2025, some Indonesians raised the Straw Hat Pirates' Jolly Roger flag from the One Piece anime franchise as a symbol of protests. This coincided with the build up to 17 August, when the country celebrated its 80th anniversary of Independence. This flag was first flown by truck drivers in late July 2025 to protest the administration of Prabowo Subianto. They also refused to fly any Indonesian flags as a part of the demonstration against the prohibition of ODOL (over dimension, overload) trucks throughout several cities in Java, ongoing since 19 June.

In response, the flag was called a threat to the national unity of Indonesia by its government, especially by the leading figures from People's Consultative Assembly. The flag has been also declared a symbol of treason and waving the flag is considered as an act of rebellion and sedition, while various government institutions attempted to ban this flag.

In August, a number of protests were held in several cities and regencies due to significant increases in property tax by the local governments. Notable protests were held in Pati (250% increase), Bone (300%), and Cirebon (150-1000%). The protest in Pati on 13 August resulted in a clash between protesters and police, with 33 people injured.

==== October ====
On 3 October 2025, the Indonesian government suspended the license of TikTok, the platform's second largest customer base, after the application refused to disclose the data of individuals who live streamed protests. TikTok's suspension ended after it shared data with the Indonesian government.

=== 2026 ===
==== June ====
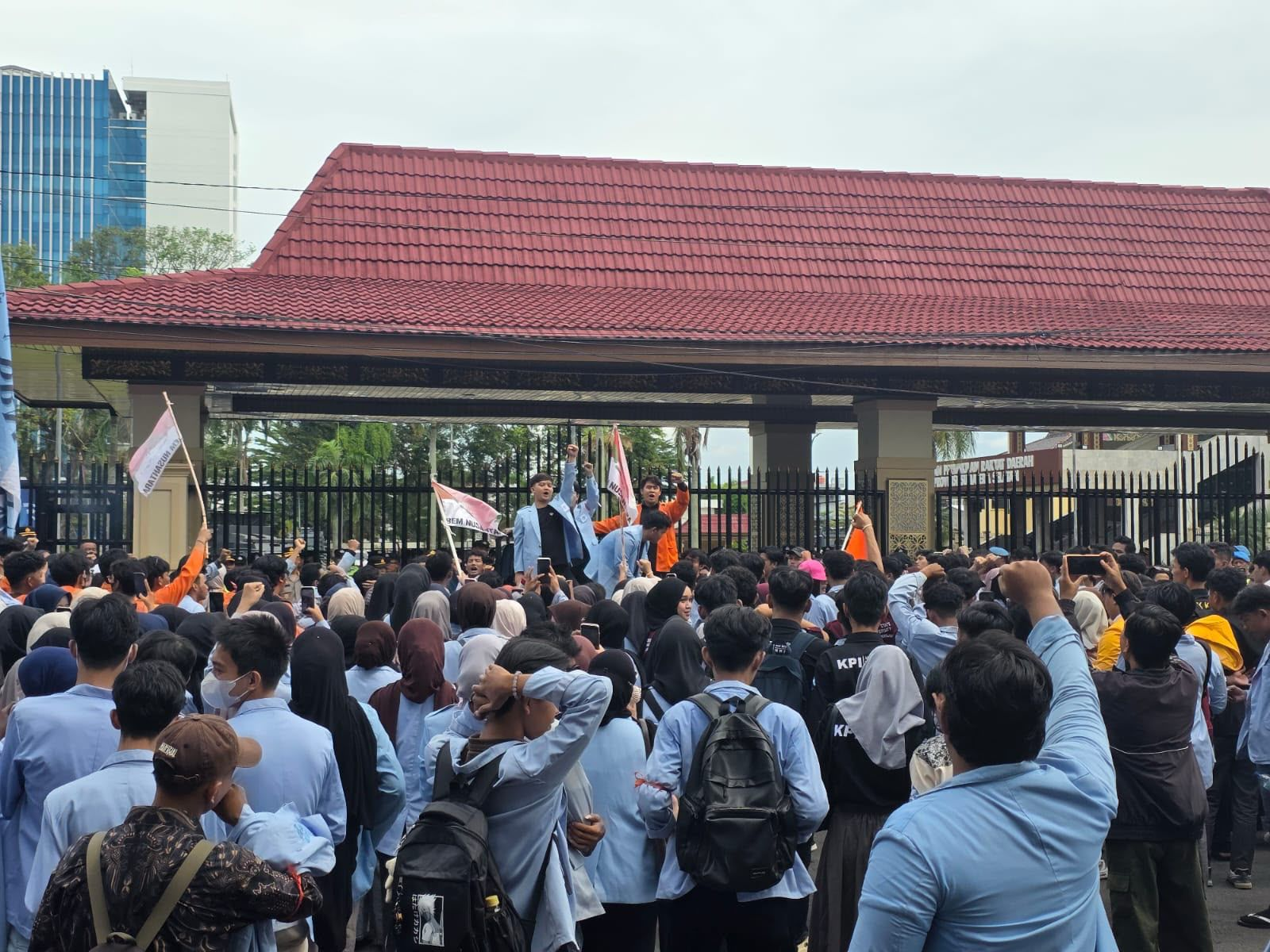
Student protests in South Sumatra

On 12 June 2026, hundreds of students protest against Prabowo Subianto prompted by a fuel price hike, weakening of Indonesian rupiah against other currencies such as United States dollar, Malaysian ringgit, and Chinese yuan, governmental tensions, and mismanaged government spending on the Free Nutritious Meals program.

On 15 June 2026, student protest were held across multiple cities, including Jakarta, Bandung, North and South Sumatra. The protests was happening during president of Germany Frank-Walter Steinmeier visit to Indonesia. Protesters from Universitas Bung Karno were blockaded by the police from entering Tugu Tani, but still managed to meet with the vice president Gibran Rakabuming Raka. The protestors give a deadline for the government to answer by 19 June.

On the same day, 15 June; a group of student protesters stormed the Gadjah Mada University hall which holds national discussion that invited 3 officials; namely Minister of Agrarian Affairs and Spatial Planning Nusron Wahid, Head of Acceleration of Poverty Reduction Agency Budiman Sudjatmiko, and Deputy Minister of Agriculture Sudaryono. Situation later become tense when group of angry student protesters start pushing security guards to get into the stage. It was also reported that the official cars were chased down and nearly vandalized by protesters after the officials were told to evacuate by the police forces.

On 18 June, a group of student led protestors in Pontianak marched onto the Digoelis Park Monument.

On 19 June, numerous pro-government counter protesters consisting of farmers were deployed in Jakarta mainly to support the government flagship free nutritious meal programme.

==== August ====
On 27 August, one year after the 2025 August riot, a mass consist of Pati Regency citizens staged a protest in front of DPR building pressuring them to pass the asset forfeiture bill. Due to huge masses, Pati citizen representatives were let in by the lawmakers and the DPR leadership has agreed to pass the bill before 15 December as concession.

Shortly after the lawmakers audience with representatives of Pati citizen, a group of anarchists and vocational school students staged a riot at noon. A police station in Slipi was burned by masses at night. The riot also subsequently disrupted the Green Line of commuter line. On late night, a clashes erupt between anarchist group and pro-government organized gang, Peoples Movement for a New Indonesia (GRIB Jaya) in Slipi and Pejompongan. It was reported at least 5 trucks belonged to GRIB Jaya was destroyed by anarchist masses. During the day of demonstration, a 59 year old local named Bambang Setiyawan died in the middle of the clash after being allegedly lynched by GRIB Jaya masses after being mistaken as protester. 322 protesters were also reportedly arrested and 18 year old schoolboy named Faturohman was also injured during the clash.

==== October ====
Clashes between protesters and law enforcement in front of Plaza Indonesia, Jakarta

Another large scale protest was held again on 20 October, coincides with 2nd anniversary of Prabowo's rise to power. Students from numerous universities in Jakarta and Yogyakarta took the street to protest government response to 2026 Indonesia wildfires and demand transparency regarding the case of the high school and university diploma of Vice President Gibran Rakabuming Raka (see Gibran Rakabuming Raka diploma controversy). In Yogyakarta the protest was focused on Yogyakarta Regional Representative Council building and in Jakarta, the protest was focused on Heroes Monument and Danareksa Tower. Prior to the protest, Greenpeace installed a banner in Selamat Datang Monument in early morning to protest about wildfires, the banner was later removed by authorities shortly after it was installed. In Yogyakarta, a brawl broke out between protesters and police officers and pro-government paramilitary group in Malioboro with witness state that paramilitary group were beating student protesters mercilessly resulting 6 students from Yogyakarta State University and Gadjah Mada University injured and rushed immediately to nearest hospital. In Bandung, the protest were centered at Jalan Naripan, Jalan Asia Afrika, and Jalan Braga. During the process, student protesters vandalized 2 vans belonged to National Nutrition Agency as a form of dissatisfaction with the government free meal programme. 16 police officers were attacked by group of black clad assailants resulting 4 police officers heavily wounded with rest of 12 police officers sustained minor injuries. 13 arrests were made with bricks and rattans were seized from the perpetrators.

On 28 October, the 98th anniversary of Youth Pledge, students joined with civil groups and trade union took the street nationwide with the three-finger salute from The Hunger Games that was previously used by pro-democracy protest in Hong Kong, Thailand, and Myanmar years prior; being the symbol of resistance against the government of Prabowo Subianto. The protest was focused in Jakarta around the Jalan M.H. Thamrin and Jalan Jenderal Sudirman. In Jakarta, the police has already set roadblock in front of UOB Plaza, blocking protesters into accessing the Selamat Datang Monument. The situation turn tense after the authorities refuse to remove the barrier blocking access to Hotel Indonesia roundabout, causing the student protesters begin kicking riot shields and burning the plastic barriers blocking the road. In Jakarta, at least 19 protesters were arrested after the end of protest.

The protest continued on 29 October with students of Trisakti University mobilized the masses marching from the university building in Grogol to the Merdeka Palace consisting of buses, angkots, and motorcycles marching in convoy. The students brought a flag written Tritura (3 demands) to the government which consists of:

- Restore the nation’s economy, ecology, education, politics, and healthcare
- Eradicate incompetence and the holding of multiple concurrent positions by public officials
- Uphold the civil supremacy

During the protest, the Ministry of the State Secretariat special staff member, Binbin Firman Tresnadi met with student protesters to listen to their demands. Binbin also assure the students that the aspirations will be forwarded to the President and ministers responsible.

== Demands ==
=== First phase: #IndonesiaGelap protests ===
A popular image supporting the student protest is based on the fictional Emergency Alert System (EAS) shown above but with a black background, previously blue. This has led to the bakso P.E.N.T.O.L. movement, a backronym representing six political demands (although the following emerged on 4 February, before the protest):

- Polisi diberesin ('The police must be fixed')
- Energi buat rakyat ('Energy for the people')
- Naikkan taraf hidup rakyat ('Increase the people's well-being')
- Tunaikan tukin untuk guru, ASN dan dosen ('Pay allowances for teachers, state employees, and lecturers')
- Output MBG diperbaiki ('Fix the output of the free nutritious meal program')
- Lawan mafia tanah dan lengserkan pejabat tolol ('Fight these goddamn land mafias and topple down stupid officials')

BEM UI presented these 5 demands during the student protests:

# Repeal the Presidential Instruction Number 1 of 2025, being perceived that it could harm the people.

1. Calling for status transparency of development and performance of the free nutritional meal programme.
2. Reject the attempts to revise Mineral and Coal Law and Dwifungsi Law.
3. Arrest and bring former president Joko Widodo into justice.
4. Ratify the Assets Confiscation Bill.

On 17 February 2025, during the protests in Jakarta, coordinator Bagas Wisnu read out the following 13 demands to the government.

# Free, scientific, and democratic education.

1. Genuine agrarian reforms.
2. Reject the revision attempts to the Mineral and Coal Law.
3. Remove dwifungsi of ABRI
4. Enact the Indigenous People Bill.
5. Repeal the Presidential Instruction Number 1 of 2025.
6. Total evaluation of the free nutritious meal programme.
7. Realise the budget for lecturers' allowances.
8. Asset Confiscation Government Regulation in Lieu of Law.
9. Reject the revision attempts of TNI, Polri, and Judiciary Law.
10. Streamline and reshuffle the cabinet.
11. Reject the revision of DPR Code of Conduct.
12. Reform of the police.

On 19 February, the original five demands presented by BEM SI have been expanded into the following seven.

# Demanding the President to repeal Presidential Instruction (Inpres) Number 1 of 2025 that could harm the people.

1. Transparency over development status.
2. Transparency throughout the free nutritious meal, so that it can be right on target and implemented correctly
3. Reject the revision of Mineral and Coal Law that only becomes a silencer by the regime for the campus and academic environment
4. Reject dwifungsi of TNI that it could potentially create repression and hinder democracy.
5. Arrest and bring Jokowi to justice.
6. Enact the Asset Confiscation bill to eradicate economic crimes and corruption.

Next day, the demands above were expanded again into nine.

The song "Bayar, Bayar, Bayar" from punk music duo Sukatani, used as a theme song for the protest, to criticise the Police's performance which is considered unprofessional and full of bribery, extortion, and gratification which happened inside the Police administration in Indonesia.

=== Second phase: #TolakRUUTNI protests ===
A second wave of demonstrations against the Draft Law on the Indonesian National Army (RUU TNI) took place across multiple regions, including Yogyakarta and Jakarta, on 19–20 March 2025. The protests involved students, lecturers, and civil society organizations, who expressed concerns that the bill could undermine democratic principles and civilian supremacy over the military. In Yogyakarta, protesters from the University of Gadjah Mada (UGM) and the Islamic University of Indonesia (UII) presented several key demands:

1. Demand that the Government and DPR cancel the revision of the TNI Law, which lacks transparency, is rushed, and disregards public opinion, as it constitutes a constitutional violation.
2. Demand that the Government and DPR uphold the constitution and remain committed to the Reform Agenda by preserving the principles of civilian supremacy and equality before the law, while firmly rejecting the dual function of the TNI/Polri (dwifungsi).
3. Demand that the TNI/Polri, as state institutions, undergo internal reforms and enhance their professionalism to restore public trust.
4. Urge all academics across Indonesia to take a firm stance against actions that undermine democracy, violate the constitution, and deviate from the reform agenda.
5. Encourage and support civil society efforts to safeguard the Reform Agenda by actively monitoring and holding the Government and Parliament accountable.

On 19 March 2025, students from Trisakti University staged a demonstration at Gerbang Pancasila, within the Parliament Complex in Jakarta, opposing the proposed revision of the Indonesian National Army Law (UU TNI). They presented four main demands, expressing concerns that the revisions could weaken civilian supremacy and potentially reintroduce the military's dual function (dwifungsi TNI) in politics and governance. The demands were presented to Minister of Law, Supratman Andi Agtas. The key demands of the protest included:

1. Reject the entire draft revision of the TNI Law which is considered to weaken civilian supremacy and open up opportunities for the return of the dual function of the TNI.
2. Urging the removal and termination of active TNI-Polri officers from civilian positions to prevent abuse of power and corrupt practices in the military.
3. Achieve civilian supremacy and stop the neglect of the reform agenda to ensure that the military remains in the corridor of its main task as the guardian of national defence.
4. Reject all forms of militarisation in civilian government and demand the government's commitment to safeguard democratic values and human rights.

On 7 April 2025, Suara Papua finalise demands of protesters in Indonesia. These are:

1. Close Freeport, BP LNG Tangguh and restore the people's sovereign rights.
2. Stop military operations and withdraw organic and non-organic military from all of Papua.
3. Stop the National Strategic Project (PSN) in Merauke, Fak-fak, and Sorong
4. Close down all illegal companies throughout West Papua.
5. Revoke TNI Law number 34 of 2025, reject the Police Bill, reject the Broadcasting Bill.
6. Give the right to self-determination as a democratic solution for the Papuan people.
7. Reject the Makan Bergizi Gratis Programme ('Free Nutritious Meal'; MBG).
8. Stop the criminalisation and killing of Papuans.
9. Allow foreign journalists to cover Indonesia, especially the Land of Papua.
10. Thoroughly investigate cases of human rights violations in the Land of Papua.
11. Stop the Sorong Special Economic Zone (SEZ) development project.
12. Stop the silencing of democratic space and stop the criminalisation of Papuan pro-independence activists.
13. Pass the Indigenous Peoples Bill.
14. Stop mining exploration in Raja Ampat

=== Third phase: 17+8 Demands ===
During the August 2025 Indonesian protests, public figures and advocates published 25 demands, split into 17 demands to be enacted in one week and 8 demands to be enacted in one year.

Due 5 September 2025:

1. Form an independent investigative team to investigate the incidents involving Affan Kurniawan, Umar Amirrudin, as well as all victims of violence and other human rights violations throughout the protests taking place 28–30 August in a clear and transparent manner.
2. Halt all involvements of the TNI in securing civil matters, and return the TNI to the barracks
3. Free all of the protestors that are currently being held and ensure that no criminal charges are pressed upon protestors.
4. Arrest, and try in a transparent court of law all of the members and commanders that ordered acts of violence (against protestors).
5. Halt all acts of violence conducted by the police and follow current guidelines set forth on controlling masses.
6. Freeze all raises and allowances for all members of the DPR and cancel all new facilities (for members of the DPR).
7. Publish transparent expenditure disclosures (salaries, allowances, houses, facilities for the DPR) proactively and continuously
8. Investigate the ownership of assets for problematic members of the DPR by the KPK
9. Push the Honorary Council of the DPR to investigate members who have misappropriated the will of the people.
10. (Political) Parties must fire or impose harsh sanctions on cadre's (entrusted members of the party) who have acted unethically and sparked the anger of the public.
11. Announce the commitment of all (political) parties to side with the public in the midst of crisis.
12. Members of the DPR must involve themselves with dialogue taking place in public spaces with university students, and members of the public to increase meaningful participation.
13. Enact internal discipline to ensure the TNI does not take over the function of the Polri
14. (Announce a) Public commitment for the TNI to not enter civilian spaces during a democratic crisis.
15. Ensure fair wages for all employees within Indonesia (teachers, healthcare workers, labourers, ojek drivers)
16. Take emergency measures to ensure no mass layoffs occur and protect the contracts of all labourers.
17. Open talks with labour unions to reach a solution for wages and outsourcing.

Due 31 August 2025:

1. (Conduct a) Widescale cleanup and reformation of the DPR
2. (Conduct a) Widescale reform on all political parties and strengthen executive oversight
3. Assemble plans for reformation on taxation that is fairer (to all).
4. Ratify and enact the Asset Confiscation bill.
5. The strengthening and independence of the KPK, and the strengthening of the Criminal Punishments Against Corruptors Law.
6. (Conduct) Reform on the police (to ensure) professional and humanistic conduct.
7. (Ensure the) TNI to return to the barracks, without exception.
8. Reassess policies regarding the economic and workforce sector.

== Protests ==
Map of Indonesia (outside Java) showing locations where major protests occurred

=== Sumatra ===
In Banda Aceh, students from Syiah Kuala University (USK) organised a protest in front of the Aceh Regional House of Representatives (DPRA). They additionally demanded transparency of the use of a special autonomy fund. The head of NasDem Party's fraction and member of the DPRA third commission, Nurchalis, promised that the students' demands would be discussed at the legislature and carried to the national level. The protesters left significant rubbish, ranging from used drinking bottles to banners. Since the protesters ignored the requests by journalists to clean the rubbish, it was cleaned by the police.

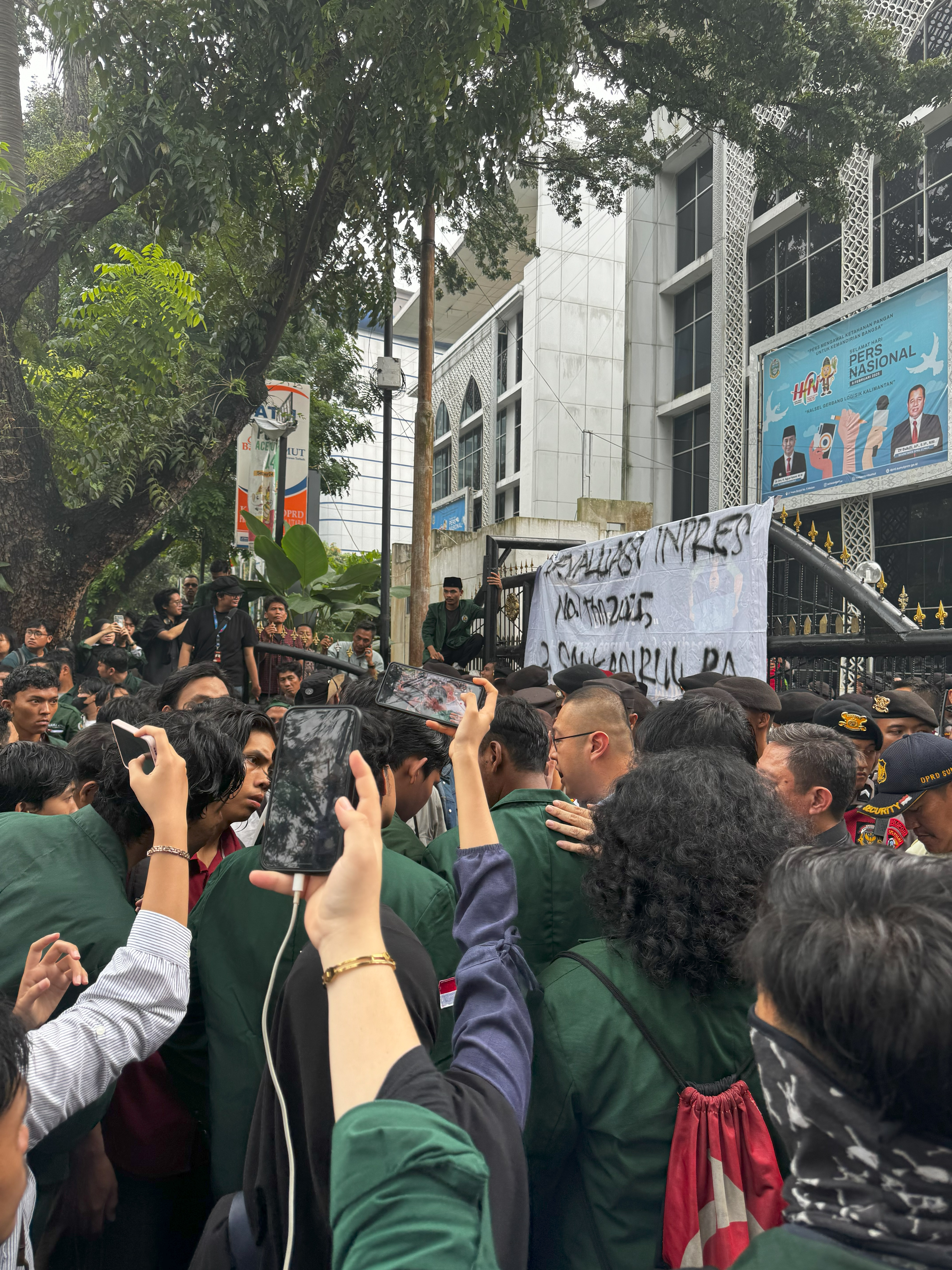
Student protestors from the State Islamic University of North Sumatra converse with Palacheta Subies Subianto, a representative from North Sumatra DPRD who is also a member of the Golkar party in front of the building.

In Medan, students from the State Islamic University of North Sumatra protested front of the building of the North Sumatra Regional House of Representatives (DPRD) on 20 February. They carried several banners, and the building was guarded by dozens of personnel. After hours, DPRD representatives met them and guaranteed that their demands will be brought to the DPRD and national DPR. Protests resumed next day, not long after, a representative of Commission C of the legislature, Palacheta Subies Subianto met them. Several posters were attached to the fences of the DPRD, and used tires were burned during the event. On 26 March, students from the North Sumatra Students' Union Alliance began to organise a sit-in front of the DPRD building at 15:00 WIB, while some others were inside the building's hall after successfully jumping over its fence. The protests escalated after they burned used tires and clashed with policemen. Next day, Accumulation of People's and Labour's Anger (AKBAR) held a protest in the same building, but later clashed with the police. According to the Commission for Missing Persons and Victims of Violence (KontraS), dozens of people were injured during the event.

In Pematangsiantar, on 27 March, students from the University of Simalungun clashed with policemen at Pematangsiantar DPRD, after attempting to forcefully enter the building. Three protesters were arrested by the police, meanwhile, one of the students, Afriadi Lesmana, was beaten up by a DPRD member and municipal policemen.

In Padang, students from Andalas University (UNAND) and Padang State Polytechnics (PNP) protested front of the UNAND entrance gate. Later, hundreds of students under the All-West Sumatra Alliance of Students' Unions protested in front of the building of the West Sumatra DPRD on 18 February 2025 at 15:00 WIB, and also held several banners.

In Bukittinggi, a number of community elements and the Bukittinggi student alliances, including the Indonesian Muslim Student Union (SEMMI) of Bukittinggi City, held a demonstration at the Bukittinggi DPRD building on 20 March 2025.

In Pekanbaru, students from the Islamic University of Riau protested front of the Riau DPRD building on 26 February. They additionally demanded for the reimbursement of scholarships for 6,000 students. The protesters dispersed after submitting their demands to the parliament members. On 14 August, protesters from University of Riau broke down the gate of governor office at Cut Nyak Dien Road, in an attempt to meet Abdul Wahid, the governor of Riau. They demanded him to answer local issues, such as wildfires, ambiguities on scholarships, and infrastructural issues.

In Tanjungpinang, 62 students protested front of the Riau Islands DPRD building. They were guarded by 150 joint personnel from regional and municipal police.

In Palembang, on 20 February, hundreds of students, mainly from Raden Fatah State Islamic University (UIN Raden Fatah), walked from Campus A at 10:00 WIB and arrived in front of the building of South Sumatra DPRD at 10:30 WIB. They attempted to bring used tires top of a command car, but they were obstructed by forces. After negotiations, they were allowed to do so. However, after failing to meet the speaker of South Sumatra DPRD, Andi Dinialdie, protesters brought down the tires and burned them in front of the building. It was previously projected that it would be attended by 1,000 people. The protesters also gave an ultimatum of 3 × 24 hours to the government to take position regarding the budget cuts. Then, deputy speaker Ilyas Panji and member of parliament M Nasir met the protesters and agreed to reject budget cuts and to fulfill their demands.

In Pangkalpinang, students from University of Bangka Belitung together with Bangka Belitung Students' Union Alliance, protested front of the building of the Bangka Belitung DPRD. They arrived at 15:20 WIB.

In Bandar Lampung, hundreds of students from various local universities protested in front of the Lampung provincial government complex. They carried an oratory car as well as several banners, one of them has the inscription PENDIDIKAN JADI TARUHAN, INDONESIA CEMAS, DARURAT PENDIDIKAN, ALERTA ALERTA! (Education is at stake, Indonesia is anxious, education emergency, alert alert!).

In Bengkulu, students mainly from Muhammadiyah Bengkulu University gathered in Simpang Lima, Ratu Sambang District. They stated that they also held protests in Padang Kuas, Seluma Regency while stating that the student organizations there are consolidating for a bigger protest that will be held later.

=== Java ===
Map of Indonesia (inside Java) showing locations where major protests occurred

==== Jakarta ====
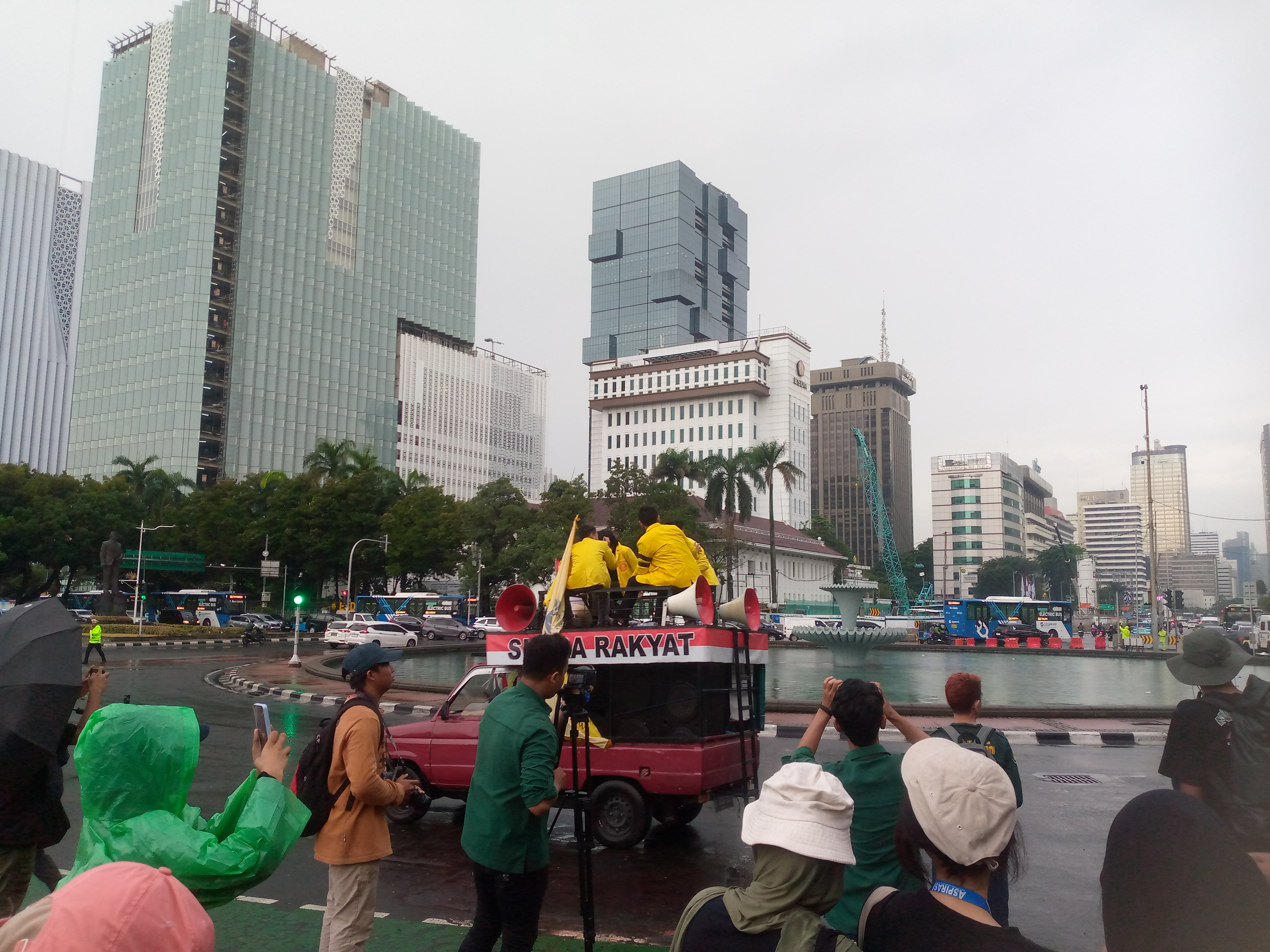
Students from the University of Indonesia participating in the protest

In Jakarta, the protests started on 17 February at Horse Statue, Central Jakarta, but then spread into South Medan Merdeka and West Medan Merdeka Roads, causing traffic jams at Bundaran HI. Thousands of protesters shouted hidup mahasiswa ('long live students') and carried various banners and posters that represent their demands, such as #krisisiklimkrisisdemokrasi ('a climate crisis is a democratic crisis') and kenyang kagak, bego iya ('not yet full, damn stupid').

Previously, student union of the University of Indonesia (BEM UI) instructed its members to wear black clothing and yellow alma maters, which is characteristic of the university. A total of 1,623 joint personnels were deployed for security, and traffic at West Medan Merdeka Road towards Merdeka Palace was closed, except for the Transjakarta Bus.

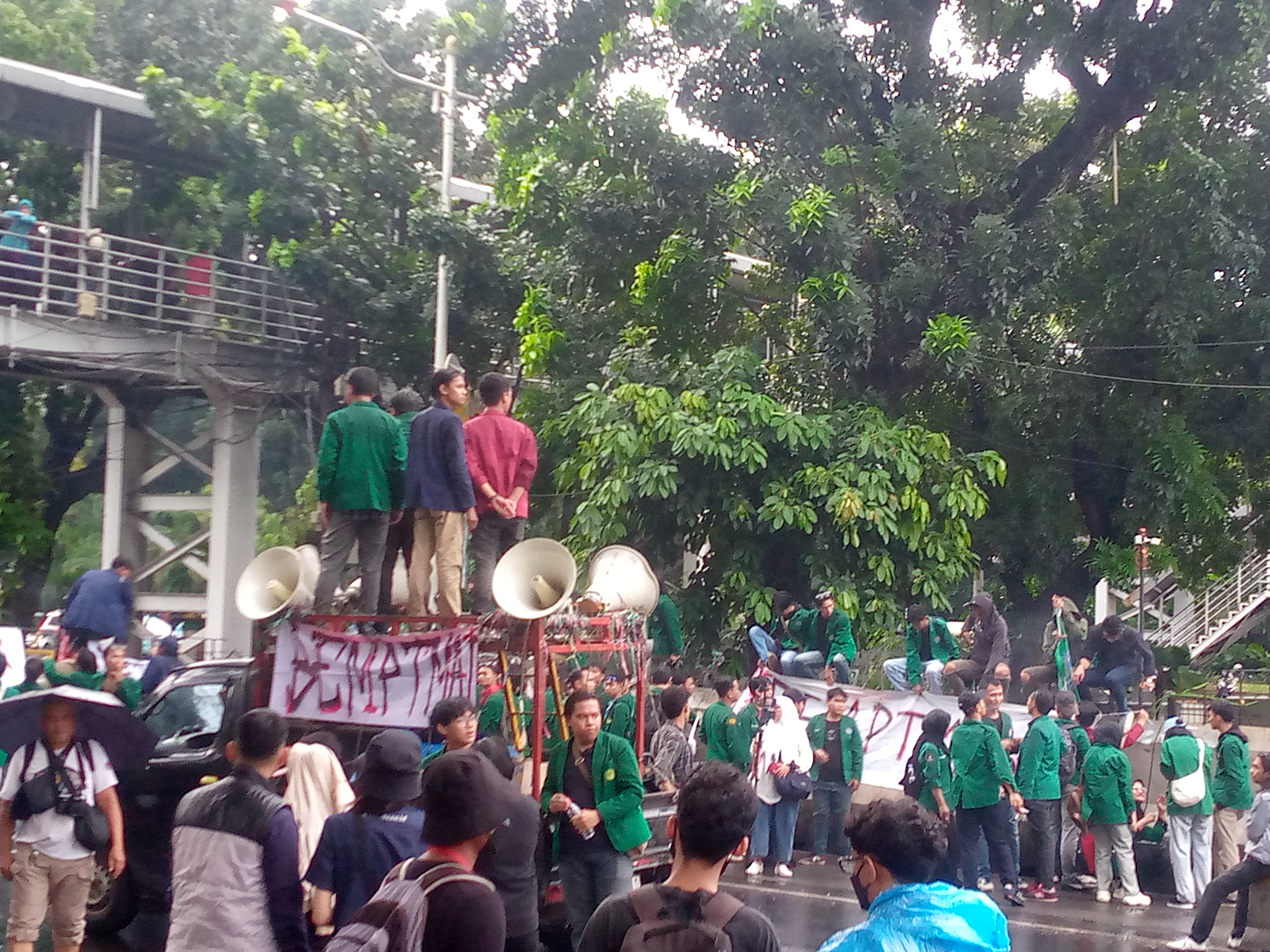
Students from Muhammadiyah and 'Aisyiyah Universities (PTMA) standing in front of a police blockade

They later burned used tires and several posters, including a portrait of cabinet secretary Teddy Indra Wijaya, and several of them took down their almamaters under the instruction of an orator. At 16:00 WIB, the police appealed to the protesters to disperse, but they remained and threw objects such as water bottles, rubbish, and wooden slats on policemen. One policeman was injured during the event. Public relations coordinator for National Developmental University "Veteran" of Jakarta, Bagas Wisnu, read out 13 demands to the government, ranging from educational to political issues (see above). They finally dispersed on 20:00 WIB and janitors began to clean rubbish at the site. Disabled influencer Badru also attended the protests and prayed for the protesters.

The plans for a demonstration next day were cancelled by BEM SI, in preparation for peak demonstrations on 20 February at Istana Negara, will be held simultaneously with the inauguration of 481 regional heads. A day later, BEM SI organised again a protest at Arjuna Wiwaha Horse Statue, and guarded by 775 joint personnels, although its coordinator Herianto said that they would organise a field technical this date in order to discuss its preparation. However, the head of public relations at Greater Jakarta Metropolitan Regional Police, Ade Ary Syam, appealed to the public to maintain order during the inauguration of regional heads by not organising protests at Istana Negara this time. The students' union of Udayana University also decided not to participate in this protest. The protests were held at 14:00 WIB (protesters would gather at 13:00 WIB), and Herianto projected that it would be attended by 3,000 students.

Half section of the West Medan Merdeka Road was closed starting from 11:34 WIB and the police used forklifts to install concrete blockades. The Central Jakarta police deployed 588 joint personnels from Horse Statue towards front of Istana Negara, and barbed wires were installed at the location. This time, protesters from 4 students' unions arrived at 14:37 WIB at Horse Statue, seen wearing their almamaters. They also carried various banners and pamphlets, with inscriptions such as Efisienshit and 1 Presiden Berbagai Insiden ('One President Full of Incidents'). They started with giving speeches front of the blockades. They were also seen raising up fists on their left arms. Nada, a 44-year-old woman, distributed free foods and drinks for protesters at the location.

The protesters began to burn used tires near the concrete blockades at 14:45 WIB. Then, they tore down the blockades using ropes on the instruction by the orator, while the local police requested them to not do so. After their efforts were successful, they sang national anthem "Indonesia Raya" and "Indonesia Pusaka". During the event, the protesters accused a man for pickpocketing, and later submitted him to nearby police post.

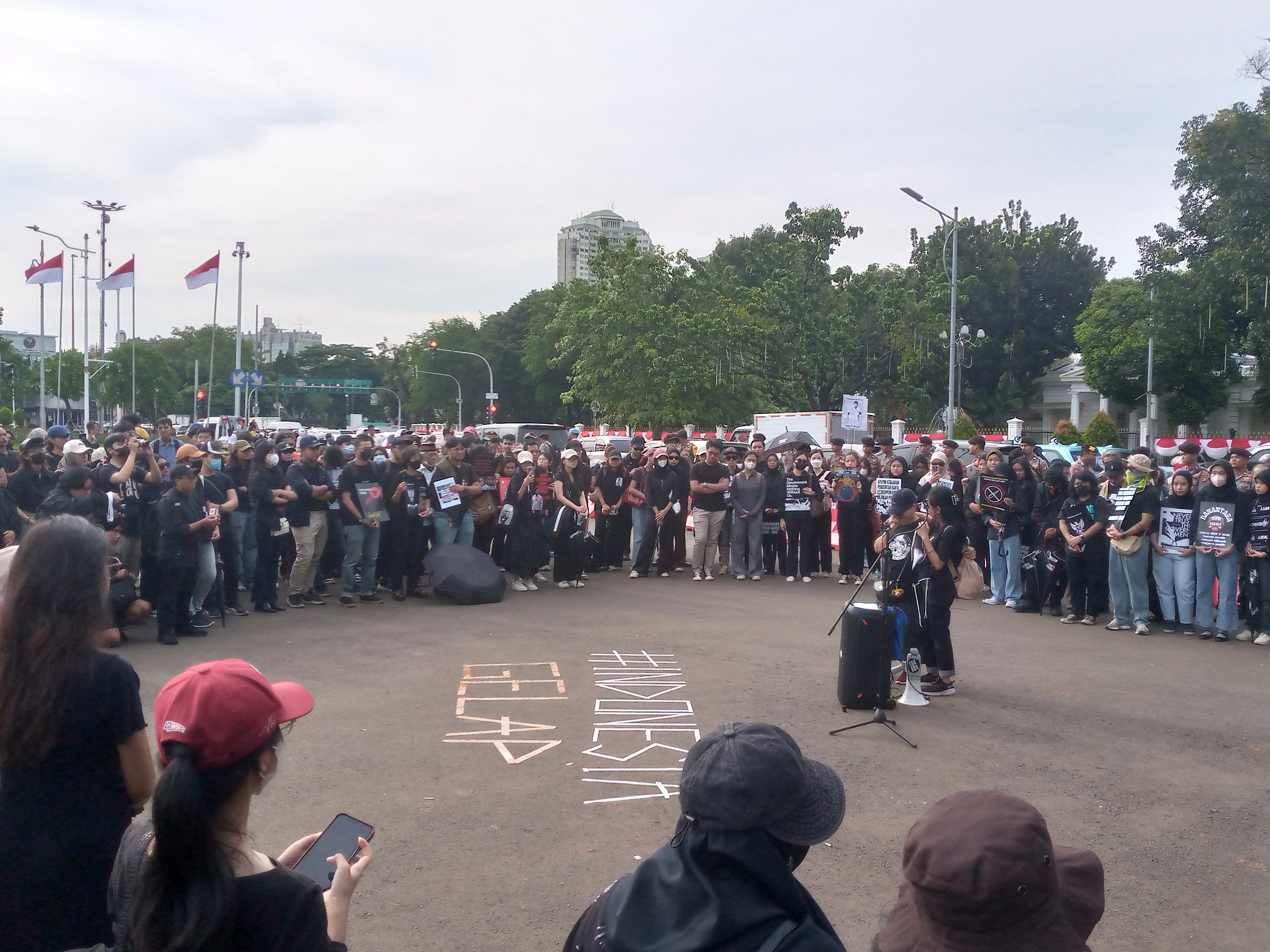
Protesters in front of Merdeka Palace during the Thursday Action, raising the theme "Dark Indonesia" in support for the student demonstration, 20 February 2025

Raden Roro Neno gave a speech to protesters, encouraging them not to be trampled by the oligarchy. She also gave support for them and prayed for their success and health. A female student read the poem "Apa Guna" by Widji Thukul. One foreign national was arrested by plainclothes (suspected to be intelligence officers) while taking images during the protests. He later admitted that he was not part of any foreign media outlet.

The protesters finally dispersed on 18:25 WIB after Minister of the State Secretariat Prasetyo Hadi, together with his deputy Juri Ardiantoro met them and agreed to their demands. Prasetyo also requested the protesters to learn their demands within 48 hours before discussing it with student representatives. He was seen inviting the protesters to sing "Darah Juang" together, and hugged the protesters. Later, Prasetyo claimed that his struggles in the government, were in line with the students' demands.

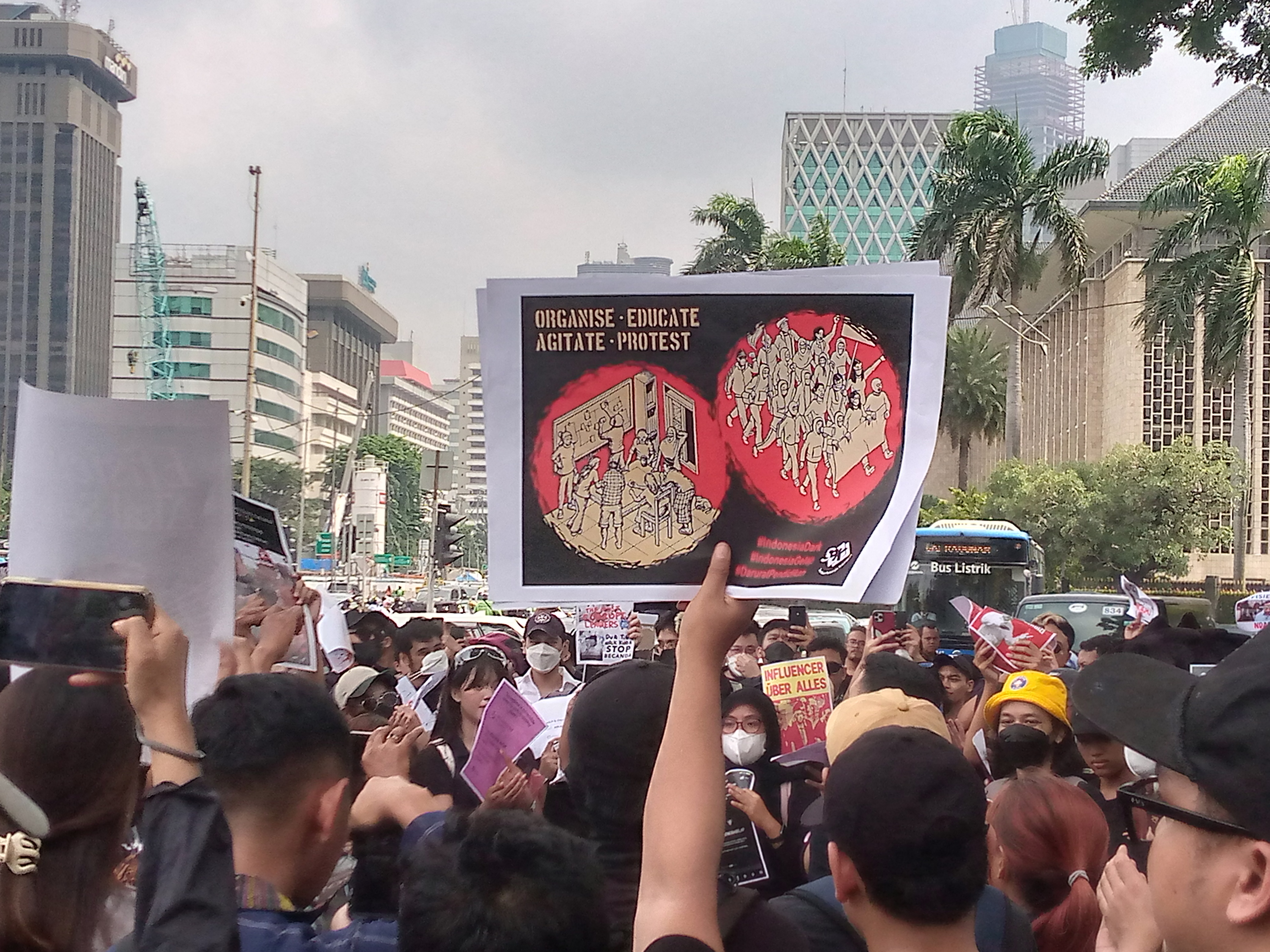
Protesters showcasing pro-intelligentsia flyers

On 21 February, hundreds of civilian elements, including students without their almamaters, gathered at Ismail Marzuki Park before protesting at Horse Statue. They carried various banners and posters, one of them featured Prabowo's old post on Twitter from 2016. The protesters also played the song "Bayar Bayar Bayar" by Sukatani and "The Internationale" translated into Indonesian by Ki Hajar Dewantara. Then, they threw away water bottles and firecrackers to policemen, and damaged barbed wires. Badru returned to the protests and read out all five principles of Pancasila for the protesters. One protester was seen destroying a CCTV at 17:55 WIB. There were incidents of throwing Molotov cocktails, firecrackers, and fireworks, but also the burning of water barriers on the Transjakarta busway, followed by alerta ('alert') shouts. They also burned rubbish at the location, and rampaged an intruder, allegedly an intelligence officer, in the middle of the protests. The crowds finally dispersed at 20:30 WIB. and janitors began to clean rubbish and extinguish fires.

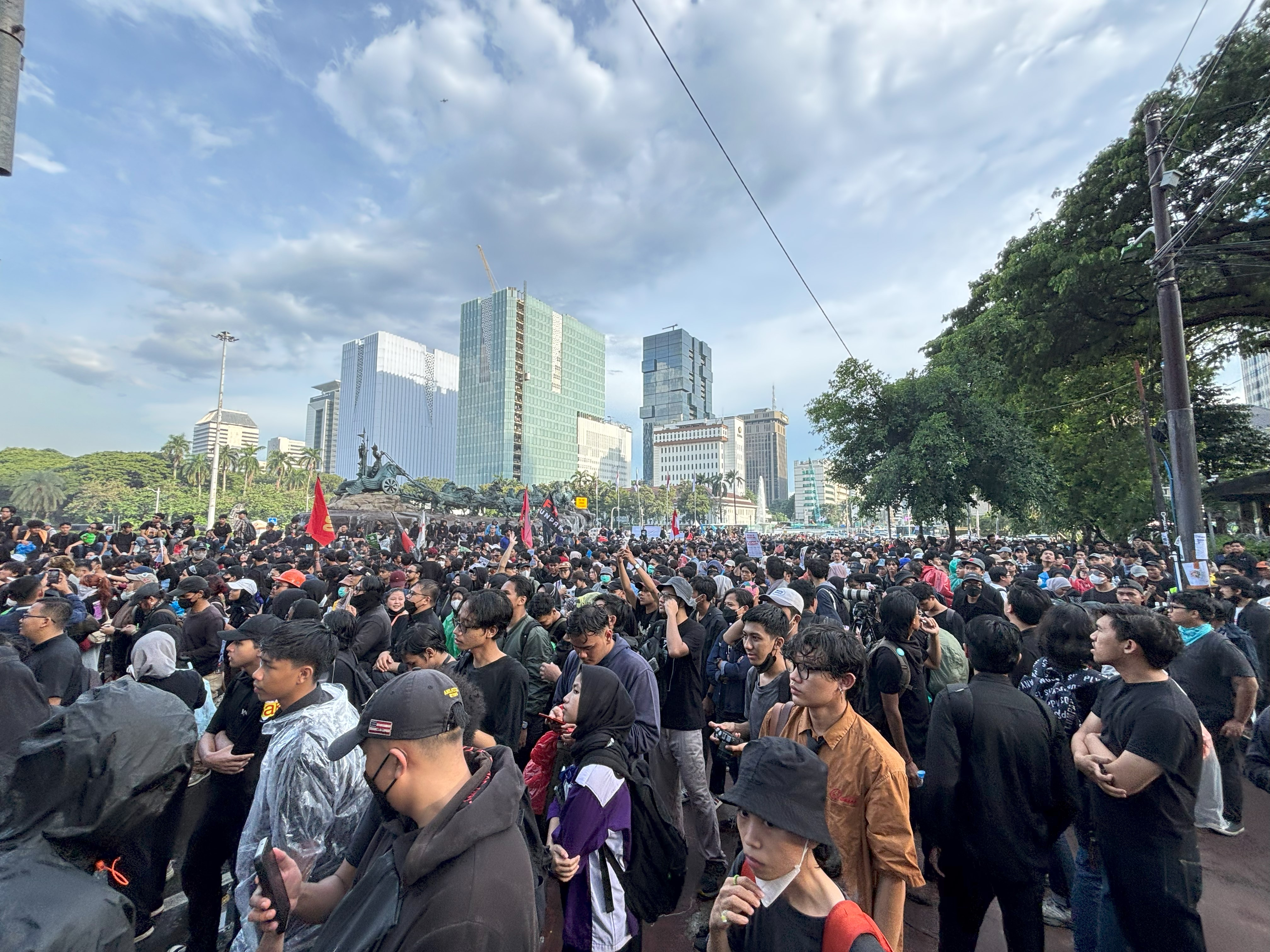
Non-alma mater youth protesters gathering at Bundaran Patung Kuda, 21 February 2025

Around 2,460 joint personnels from regional police, military, and the regional government, were deployed for security during the protests. Haus distributed 1,500 cups of free drinks for protesters through 15 stands. The fan club of South Korean boy band NCT, NCTzen, deployed an ambulance under the 'NCTzen Humanity x Bareng Warga' banner and distributed free foods for the protesters. It was projected that 2,500 people would attend the protests.

Members of the KontraS activist group being escorted after occupying the Fairmont Hotel in Senayan, Jakarta, 15 March 2025.

On 15 March, the Civil Society Coalition led by Andrie Yunus stormed a representatives meeting held at the Fairmont Hotel in Senayan minutes before iftar. During the storming, representatives consist of the First Commission of the House of Representatives are discussing to pass the revision of the Armed Forces law behind closed door for 2 days. The protesters were later dispersed by the security guards.

On 19 March, the student mass protest would resume in Jakarta as group of students from Trisakti University planned to hold a rally in front of the parliament building gate for 2 days. At the middle of the protest, law minister Supratman Andi Agtas along with 13th commission member Vita Ervina were blocked from entering the parliament building. Protesters initially tried to eject Agtas from the car despite being heavily guarded but after being pressured, Agtas voluntarily exited his car to meet the protesters. The protesters also began to set up tents front of the gate into DPR.

On 20 March 2025, the Indonesian Women's Alliance joined the protest, demanding the DPR to withdraw the revision of Armed Forces Law. During the event, 5,021 joint personnels from police, military, and local government were deployed with reported minor clashes between law enforcers, camping protesters, and few journalists. Speaker of the DPR, Puan Maharani, answered to the protests and stated that the legislature is ready to give explanation regarding ambiguities on the law. Meanwhile, a black flag charged with the national emblem of Indonesia and text Indonesia Gelap in the bottom, was flown half-mast at front of Gerbang Pancasila.

During the protest, 4 students from University of Indonesia and one from Muhammadiyah Prof. Dr. Hamka University were reportedly injured during the protest and were rushed to hospital after the police opened fire against the protesters. One motorcycle taxi driver was beaten by police after being mistaken as protester. Some segments of the fences front of the DPR were also broken down, after the crowd attempted to enter the building. Due to the situation on the street, ambulances were unable to drive to the area due to the mentioned circumstances, as a result some injured protesters were transported to nearby Pelni hospital using motorcycle. One protester was reportedly missing after the protest and 5 people were arrested. At least 4 police officers suffered injuries after being hit by firecrackers thrown by protesters.

Indonesian protesters wearing gear and umbrellas reminiscent of the 2020 Hong Kong and Thai Protests. The scene depicts demonstrators being provoked and dispersed with tear gas, readying umbrellas to counter police actions, 27 March

On 27 March, 1,824 joint personnel from the police, military, and local government were deployed in preparation for the protests at DPR building. In order to avoid violent outbreak and future doxxing from happening, protesters begin to wear protective gears since 27 March inspired from Hong Kong Umbrella Movement and 2019 Hong Kong protest that happened prior and the move was later followed nationwide. They carried various banners and stickers, such as Negara ini asasnya Pancasila, bukan Sapta Marga ('The ideology of this country is Pancasila, not Sapta Marga').

The protesters began to blockade the toll road located near the Parliamentary Complex, lit fireworks, and burned used tires front of the gate. Some of them attempted to climb its fences after being upset that no representative of the DPR could met the protesters. They also burned down a police motorcycle and overran its driver, who at the moment wore civilian clothing. As a response, the police attempted to forcefully disperse protesters using water cannon at 18:20 WIB, and some of the crowd were pushed out into Senayan. They finally dispersed at 18:31 WIB, and janitors began to clean rubbish throughout Gatot Subroto Road.

On 28 March 2025, Indonesian Mothers' Voice held a protest at the pavement of Sarinah Building.

A smaller protest resumed on 7 April 2025 after Lebaran. Numerous protesters set up camping tents in front of the parliament building. Themed Piknik Melawan ('Picnic to Resist'), they were forced to move into pavement next to Gelora Road on 8 April, and their tents were forcibly dismantled by 30 officers from Municipal Police next day. The protesters have requested for attention by governor Pramono Anung.

Piknik Melawan was held again on 14 April. The tent was to be erected right in front of the Pancasila Gate of the House of Representatives, however, the participants were forced to move to the pavement opposite. On that night, six picnic participants, two women and four men, were put into a police car. The arrests were said to have been made without interrogation and without legal representation. Half an hour or so later, those arrested were released. They regrouped and set up their tents again.

On 15 April, Bivitri Susanti, constitutional law expert, gave a public lecture at Piknik Melawan. The discussion between Bivitri and dozens of camp participants began at around 15:55 WIB.

On 20 April, hundreds of people took part in a rally to defend Palestine in front of the US Embassy in Gambir, Central Jakarta. There is a police force that provided a special location for the masses within 50 metres of the US Embassy. The crowd carried various paraphernalia, such as flags, scarves and accessories with Palestinian flags. They also carried posters supporting Palestine and condemning genocide. They rallied until 22:45 WIB.

On 21 April, Central Jakarta local police deployed 1,211 personnel in preparation for protests at separate locations, including US Embassy, MPR/DPR building, Polri headquarters, and Sarinah Road. It was reported that 10 protests would be held in Jakarta.

On 28 July 2025, 1,489 joint personnel were deployed in preparation for the Indonesia (C)emas ('Anxious Indonesia', in reference to Golden Indonesia 2045 Vision) protest at National Monument. Protesters dispersed on 18:00 WIB. after their demands accepted by Vice Minister of the State Secretariat, Juri Ardiantoro.

On 21 August, Students Together with the People Movement (GEMARAK) alongside other civilian alliances, held a protest at front of MPR/DPR building at 14:00 WIB. Would be deployed 1,145 unarmed joint personnel in that protest. The protesters spread out a banner with the inscription "INDONESIA SOLDOUT" and flew the Straw Hat Pirates' Jolly Roger flags. One orator highlighted the issue of increasing educational costs and the ownership of state assets by businessmen.

On 25 August, university students, online motorcycle taxi drivers (ojol), as well as other civilians, originally amounted up to 80 people, began to hold a protest at the MPR/DPR building at 10:00 WIB. The protesters were coordinated by Abdul Wahid Kaliki, Raka Abimanyu, and Ade Pratama, and they demanded for the ratification of Asset Confiscation Bill. Around 452 joint personnel were deployed to the demonstration. However, this number was soon increased to 1,250, and 360 additional personnel were further deployed at few places such as the Slipi Palmerah traffic light, Tomang, and Grogol. In response to the demonstration, access into front of MPR/DPR building was closed at 10:30 WIB, with the last being a Transjakarta route at 12:30 WIB Some junior high school (SMA) students also participated in the protest, although the head of Jakarta Metropolitan Resort Police, Purnomo Condro called to those below the age of 18 to withdraw. The protesters were seen flying the Straw Hat Pirates' Jolly Rogers. They also vandalised the back gate of the MPR/DPR building, with words such as PEJABAT KEPARAT ('officials are bastards') and BUBARKAN DPR ('dissolve the DPR'). During the protest, the police also distributed mineral water to protesters.

Over time, the protests soon turned violent. Protesters successfully broke into the smaller gate into the MPR/DPR building, then burnt a motorcycle and damaged the glass barrier at a visitor management system. They also threw objects such as stones and glass bottles into policemen. Outside the Parliamentary Complex, clashes between policemen equipped with trail motorcycles and student protesters occurred at Gerbang Pemuda Road, and the protesters attempted to destroy a Hyundai Palisade by damaging its windows. On 12:55 WIB, the police began to repel protesters into the direction of Slipi or Semanggi by using tear gas, soon after water cannons were previously shot on them. As a result, some student protesters escaped to railways. Following the riot, 15 people, consisting of 4 students and 11 anarchists, were arrested by the police, while two protesters were injured, one of them sustained a wound on his head from thrown stones. A police post at Gerbang Pemuda Road was heavily damaged and being filled with rubbish, while some structures inside the Gelora Bung Karno Stadium complex suffered from vandalism.

The Labour Party and the Confederation of Indonesian Labour Unions (KSPI) did not participate in the 25 August protest, and instead announced plans for a protest three days later at the same location. The chairman of KSPI, Mohammad Jumhur Hidayat, prohibited its members to participate in the former protest after finding the fact that the person responsible behind it was unclear. The protest was also joined by university students. Initially peaceful, the protest was later turned into a riot after a molotov cocktails, fireworks, and other sharp objects were thrown at the police and the MPR/DPR building. As a result, police sprayed water cannon and subdued the protesters away from the MPR/DPR building to nearby Plaza Senayan and Senayan City malls as well as Slipi underpass. Several mall visitors condemned the police brutality that was committed in front of the two malls, several student protesters were also taken to safety by mall security guards.

==== Malang ====
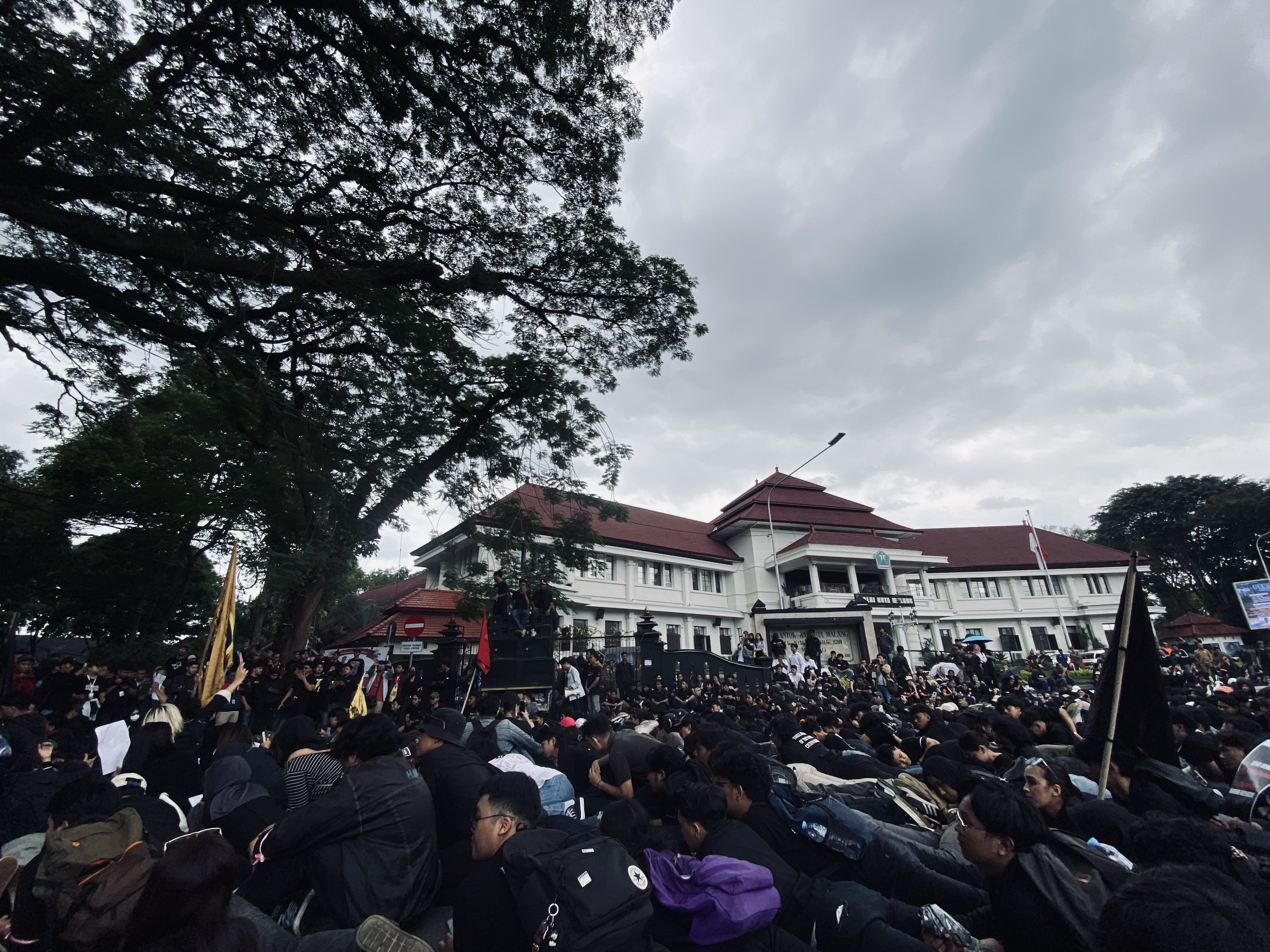
Theatrical action of crouching for cover in front of the Malang City Hall.

In Malang, protests were held on 18 February at the Monument Roundabout, precisely in front of the building of Malang DPRD. The demonstration in the Malang Raya region was initiated by a coalition of student representatives from Universitas Brawijaya and several student organizations based in Malang Raya. The initiators consisted of executive student leaders at the university and faculty levels, as well as members of faculty-based and extra-campus student organizations.

Thousands of people came at 12:00 WIB and carried various banners and posters featuring demands, with inscriptions such as Efisiensi untuk Oligarki X, Efisiensi untuk Rakyat ✓ 'No to Efficiency for the Oligarchy, Yes to Efficiency for the People', and 100 Hari Keadilan Dibunuh 'Justice Is Killed in 100 Days'. Presidential portraits of Prabowo and Gibran were defaced with the text efisienshit on their eyes and a cross on their mouths. An hour later, the portraits, alongside used tires, were burned in front of the entrance gate towards DPRD. After successfully meeting the speaker of DPRD, Amithya Ratnanggani Siraduhita, as well as several fraction leaders, the protesters finally dispersed at 16:00 WIB during heavy rains.

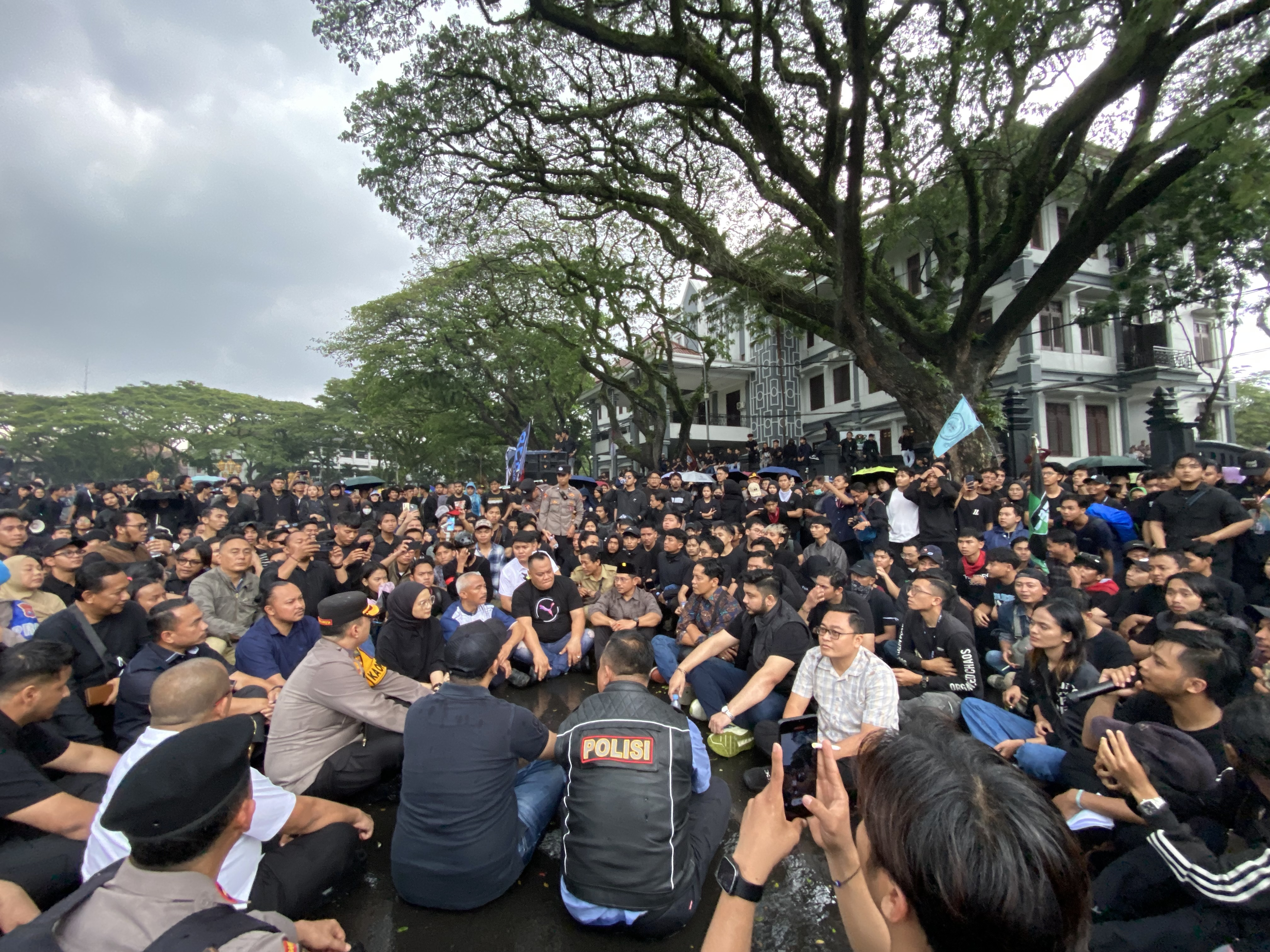
Members of the Assembly from Malang City DPRD in dialogue with demonstrators

On 23 March, protesters with black clothing returned to the Malang DPRD building at 16:00 WIB. They carried banners, vandalised the fences, and wrote demands to repeal the revised Armed Forces Law and messages critical of the government on asphalt road. They also played a theatrical featuring the reconstruction of an accident. By 18:00 WIB, the protests became increasingly violent and riots became prominent, with throwing of Molotov cocktails and burning of TNI uniforms. Seven police and TNI personnel were injured in the protests. Meanwhile, a medical team were beaten down and verbally abused by the personnels, and their medical supplies and gadgets were seized. Around 8–10 people were missing, while dozen others were injured, with 6–7 of them were rushed to local hospitals. Next day following the riots, Malang regional police and Indonesian National Student Movement branch in East Java went involved in a community service to clean up the building.

==== Surabaya ====
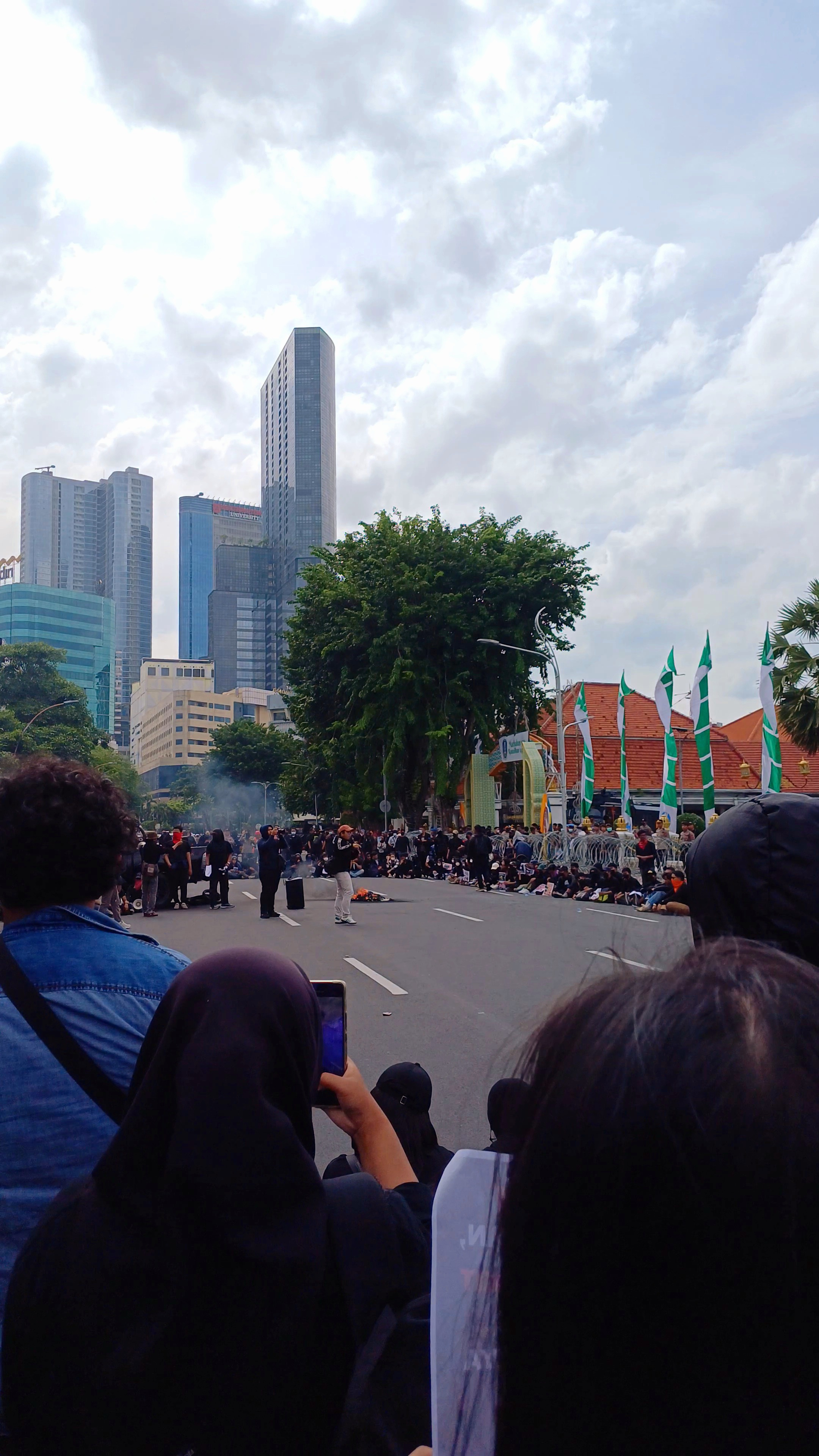
Masses protest in the framework of the rejection of the TNI Law in front of Grahadi Negara Surabaya on 24 March 2025

In Surabaya, the protests occurred before the building of the East Java Regional House of Representatives. The student protesters came from various local universities and numbered up to thousands. They burned a bier with inscription Indonesia Gelap after their attempts to meet the speaker of DPRD failed. Then, they attempted to cross the wire fence, and the police fired a water cannon at them. The protesters escaped, and several threw objects, such as water bottles, at policemen. Around 620 personnels were deployed for security during the protests. Head of the students' union of the Airlangga University, Aulia Thoriq Akbar, stated that five students have been reportedly arrested by the police. Two of them, each came from UNESA and UINSA (Sunan Ampel State Islamic University Surabaya), while head of operations Wibowo denied it. Novan Ziyan Ramadhan from the State University of Surabaya (UNESA) was injured after being stepped on and beaten up by policemen, as a result, the involved member has been reportedly questioned by the professional and security sector, although he denied it.

Protests resumed in Surabaya on 21 February, and it was attended by both students and civilians. Two members of East Java DPRD from Indonesian Democratic Party of Struggle (PDI-P), Fuad Bernardi and Yordan Batara Goa, were pettled with water bottles, after they met the protesters while in recess. They later burned used tires, reading a poem titled 'Taek', and feature a theatrical at the site.

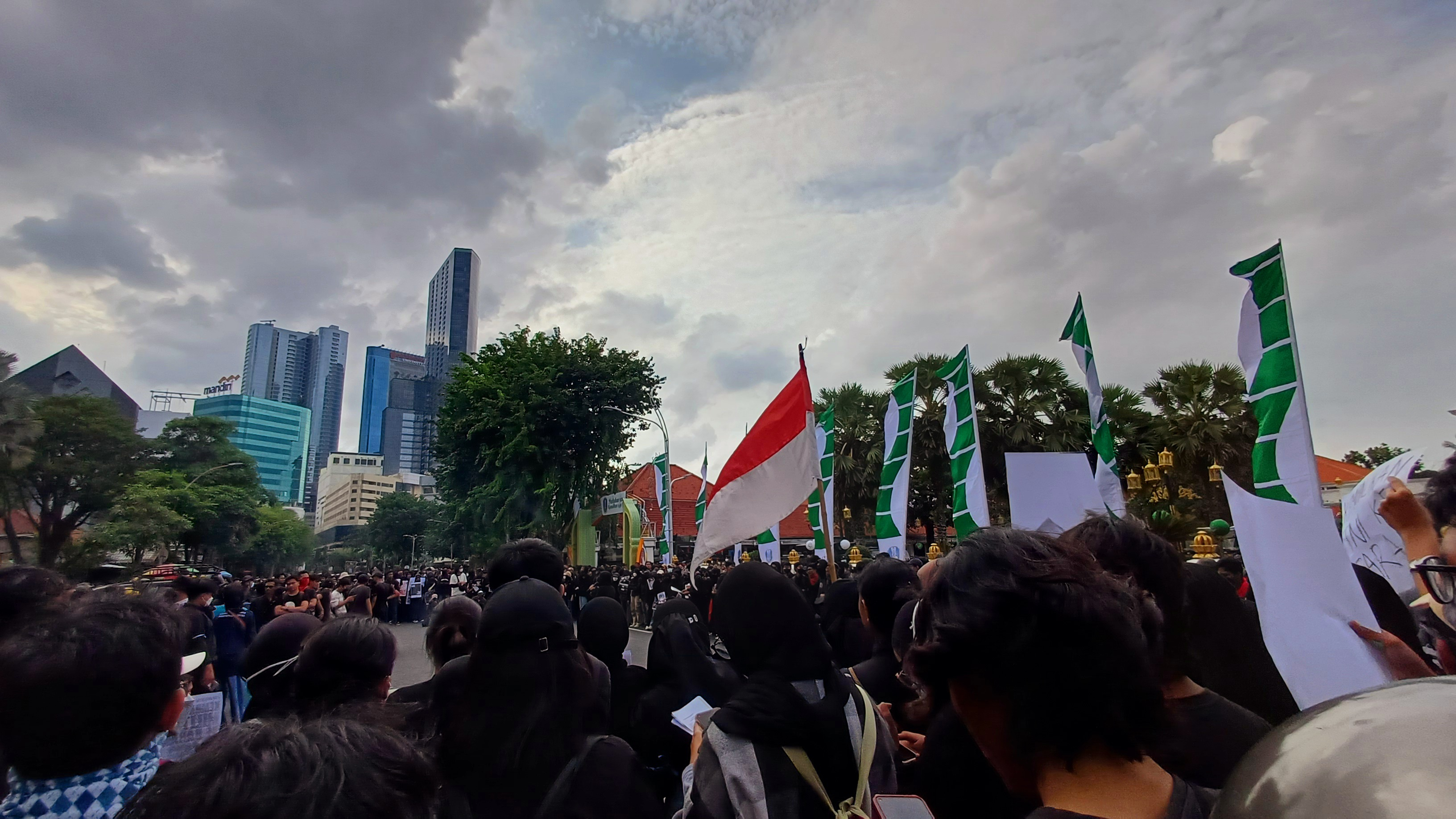
Protestors congregate for a speech in Surabaya, 24 March 2025

On 24 March 2025, hundreds of students with black clothing, arrived at Grahadi, the official residence of the governor of East Java at 14:00 WIB. They carried various posters critical of the government and burned used tires on the road. The protest turned increasingly violent when the protesters started to throw away stones, firecrackers, plastic bottles, and other objects to the guards. One of them threw away a Molotov cocktail to the gate toward Grahadi. Around 1,100 personnel from Surabaya regional police were deployed during the event, and they forcefully dispersed the protesters at 18:00 WIB with an armored car. Following the event, 25 people were arrested by the police (2 of them were students), and 6 policemen suffered injuries. The former chairman of the Surabaya branch of Indonesian National Student Movement (GMNI), Rizky Syahputra is among the injured victims, he suffered fracture on his left arm and laceration on the left leg. The protest also caused serious damage on nearby Apsari Garden, leaving thousands of plants destroyed and three lamps being lost.

On 10 April, Surabaya regional police held a traffic engineering in preparation for a protest at Grahadi, planned to be held at 14:00 WIB until 17:00 WIB. At the same time, dozens of participants wearing black clothing from Civil Society Coalition, began to hold a protest at Apsari Garden during rains at 14:45 WIB.

==== Yogyakarta ====
In Yogyakarta, the Jogja Is Calling Alliance has called students and civilians to participate in the protests. Themed #BersamaRakyat ('Together with the People'), the long march started at Abu Bakar Ali parking lot (scheduled initially at 10:00 WIB), then moved down Malioboro Street. Protesters were dressed in black to align with the viral hashtag. The action, led by students and members of the public, featured posters criticizing the economic, educational, social, and political policies of the Prabowo-Gibran administration. Slogans included: "Free Food, Crisis Education," "RIP = Republic of Indonesia Patriarchy," "Let's Fight Against the Infidels," "Don't Let the Military Run Your Kitchen!" and "Reject Oligarchy, Style ABRI Dual Function." The movement, branded Jogja Memanggil, further demanded the resignation of President Prabowo and Vice President Gibran and the dissolution of the Red and White Cabinet, citing incompetence and a perceived lack of alignment with public interests. Protesters also condemned Prabowo's response during Gerindra's anniversary event on 15 February 2025, where he reportedly said "Ndasmu!" (a Javanese insult) to critics. Demonstrators viewed this remark as unacceptable for a head of state. Just over 100 days into the new administration, the group claims the government has already caused significant harm, leading them to call for its immediate resignation and structural overhaul. The protestors would arrive at the Special Region of Yogyakarta DPRD building at 12:15 WIB. Not long after, they burned used tires, threw red liquid on the building's gate and stuck a poster with the inscription Pemerintah Tolol ('The Government Is F*ckin' Stupid').

At 14:44 WIB, protesters continued the long march towards Gedung Agung and Point Zero of Yogyakarta. They additionally demanded for the resignation of president Prabowo and his vice Gibran. It was projected that 1,000 people would participate in the protests. At the same time, several banners critical of the government were installed at the Faculty of Social and Political Sciences building at Gadjah Mada University (UGM). After the demonstration was over, students worked together to clean up the rubbish along Malioboro. The police who had previously escorted the crowd also helped clean up the area. In a short time, the location was clean again, allowing tourists to continue their activities. 'We want to show that this action is also about responsibility,' said Hermawan, one of the demonstrators. The Yogyakarta Police appreciated the peaceful demonstration through its official account, expressing gratitude to the students for maintaining order during the demonstration.

On 25 February, students under Muslim Students' Association (HMI) organised a long march at Malioboro Street towards Special Region of Yogyakarta DPRD and then the Point Zero of Yogyakarta. They also burned street cones.

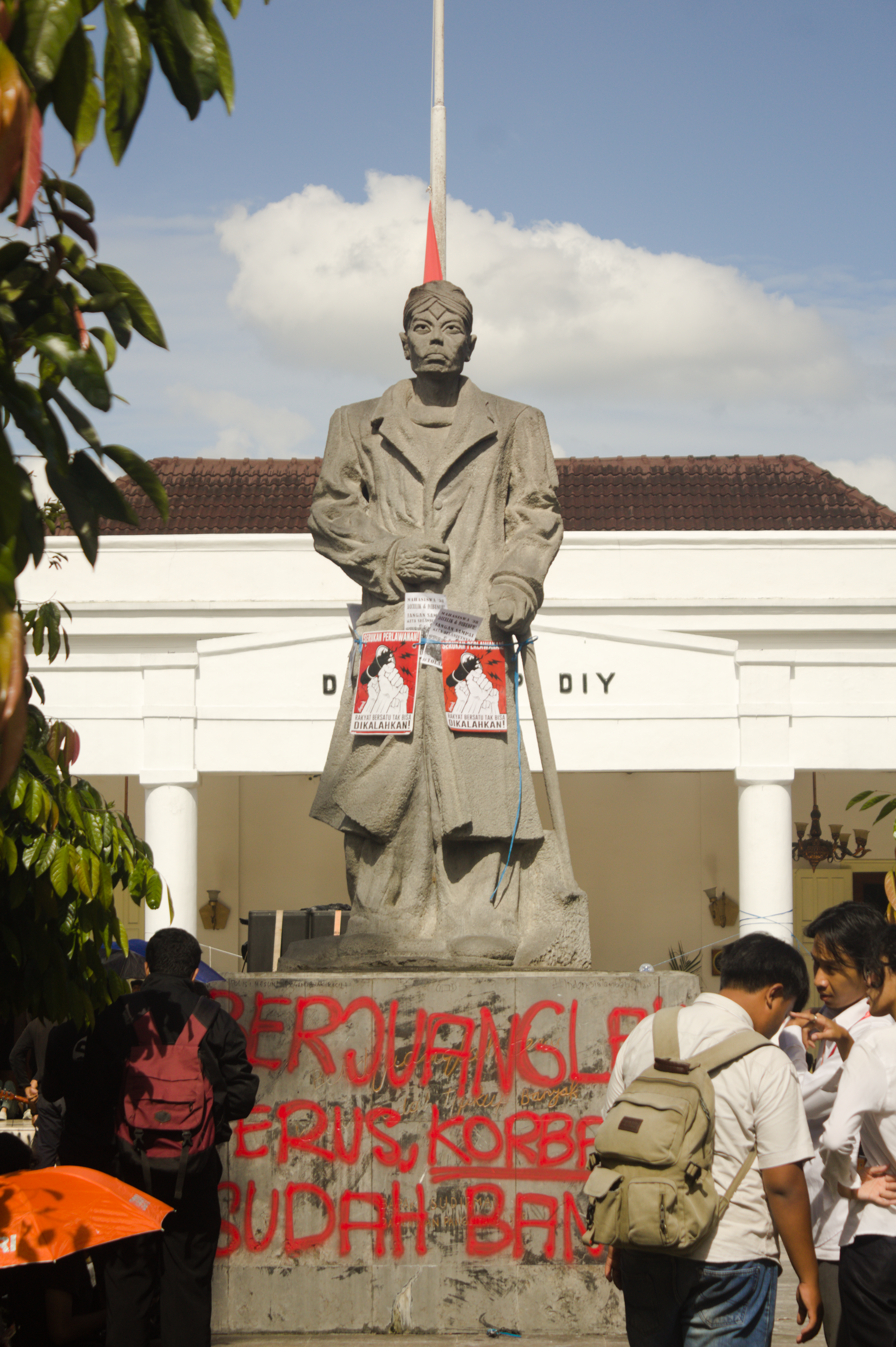
Statue of Raden Soedirman at the Yogyakarta DPRD. The graffiti reads: "Keep fighting, there are too many victims already."

Amidst concern on an upcoming draft law, the impetus for the second wave of the 2025 Indonesian protests started in Yogyakarta when the Jogja Memanggil Alliance held the 'Dark Indonesia' Volume 2 demonstration on 11 March 2025, walking from Abu Bakar Ali Parking Lot to Yogyakarta's Zero Point in the pouring rain. Dozens of students and activists demanded President Prabowo Subianto and Vice President Gibran Rakabuming Raka resign, while carrying posters criticising the government. The demonstration themed 'Ruwat Ruweting Penguasa Durno' was based on the concept of ruwatan in Javanese culture, which means cleansing from harm. Alliance spokesperson Hidayah said the ruwatan tradition is relevant to the current situation, where people need to be free from a corrupt regime. In addition to the theatrical action, the demonstrators highlighted BPI Danantara, the government's strategic investment agency, which is chaired by a number of Prabowo-Gibran cabinet officials such as Rosan Roeslani, Erick Thohir, and Sri Mulyani. They argued that these appointments violated the Law on State Ministries. Other figures such as Jokowi, Susilo Bambang Yudhoyono, and former British PM Tony Blair were also criticised for their involvement in Danantara's advisory board and supervisory board. The crowd also criticised economic policies, including the planned 12% VAT hike, the scarcity of BBM, budget cuts outside of defence, as well as weak oversight that opened up loopholes for corruption. The Indonesia Corruption Watch (ICW) recorded 119 cases of BUMN corruption in 2016–2021 with state losses of IDR 40 trillion. Demonstrators criticised Prabowo for being anti-criticism, especially after his 'ndasmu' statement that offended the people regarding the Free Nutritious Meal programme.

On 18 March, students and faculty of Gadjah Mada University organised a strike to protest against the revision of Armed Forces law which will be passed on 20 March by the House of Representatives.

Another demonstration took place on 20 March 2025, this time the demonstration took place at the DPRD of Yogyakarta Special Region. This demonstration was joined by the Jogja Memanggil alliance. In addition to being followed by the Jogja Memanggil Alliance, a number of elements ranging from students at various campuses in Yogyakarta to activists were also seen accompanying, including the Cik Ditiro Forum. Police were deployed, including tactical vehicles, to secure the action. The spokesperson for the action, Bung Koes, argued that the TNI Bill had the potential to threaten democracy by authorising soldiers to hold civilian positions. Marsinah, from the Jogja Memanggil Alliance, said the bill risked reviving authoritarianism in the style of the New Order. The masses also criticised the ratification process, which was considered to be closed and procedurally flawed.

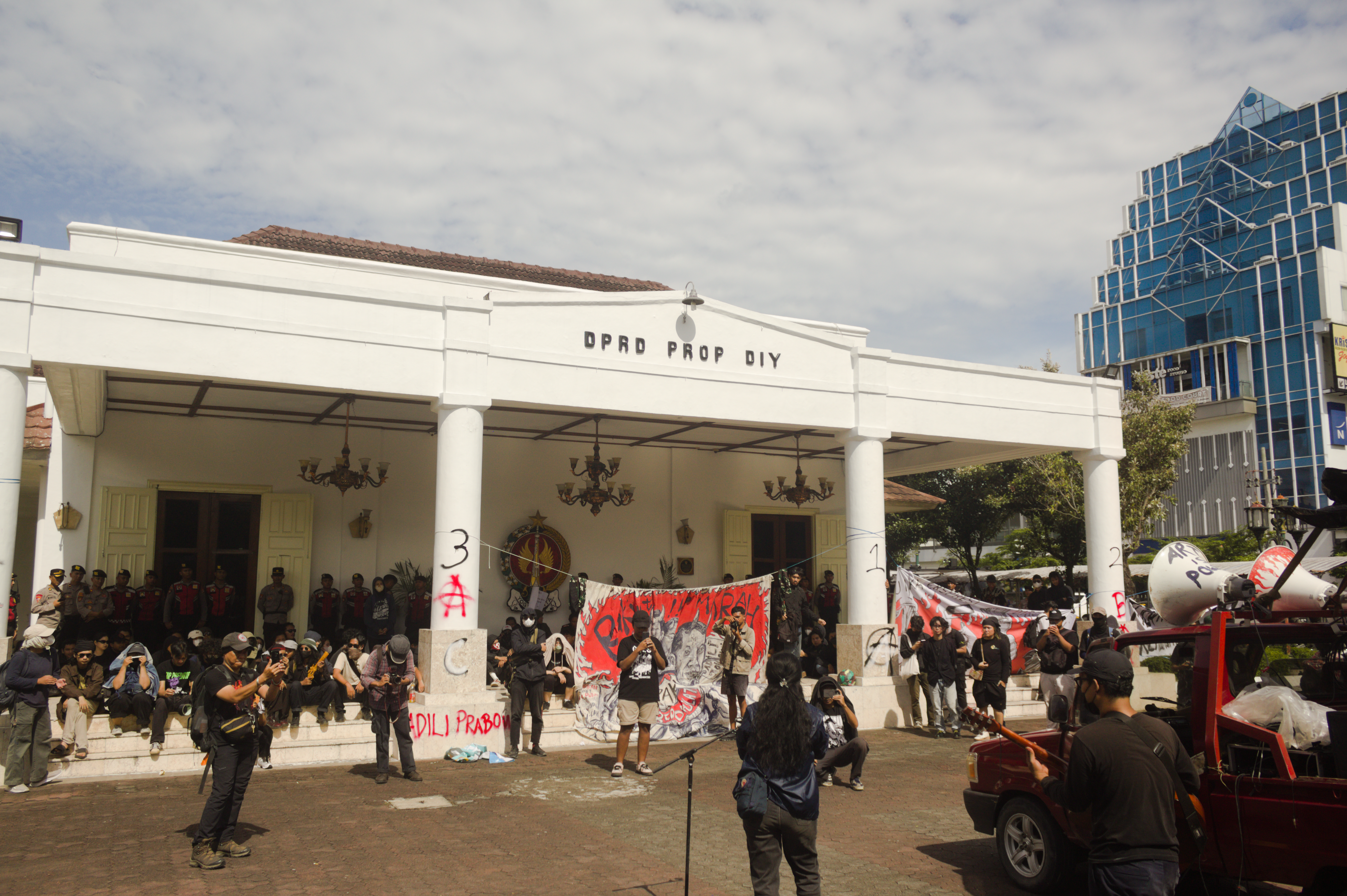
Occupation of the Yogyakarta DPRD building during the demonstration against the TNI Law, 20 March 2025

Though initially peaceful, the action turned tense at around 3.45 pm, when the crowd began to graffiti the walls of the DIY DPRD with graffiti such as 'Reject the TNI Law', 'Adili Prabowo' and anti-police calls such as 'ACAB' and '1312'. The crowd also burned garbage, set off firecrackers, lit bonfires, and threw things down the hall. Until the evening, the crowd remained and planned to stay overnight in the courtyard of the DPRD DIY. They set up tents, built bonfires, broke their fast, played games, and continued to hold a free pulpit while giving speeches. The action was interspersed with poetry reading and singing songs to encourage the protesters. The masses also called for satay, wedang ronde, and beverage vendors into the DIY DPRD environment for a meal break. Despite an ultimatum from the police, the Yogyakartan DPRD office were vandalised by thrown litters and graffiti and protesters threatened to stay in front of the office indefinitely.

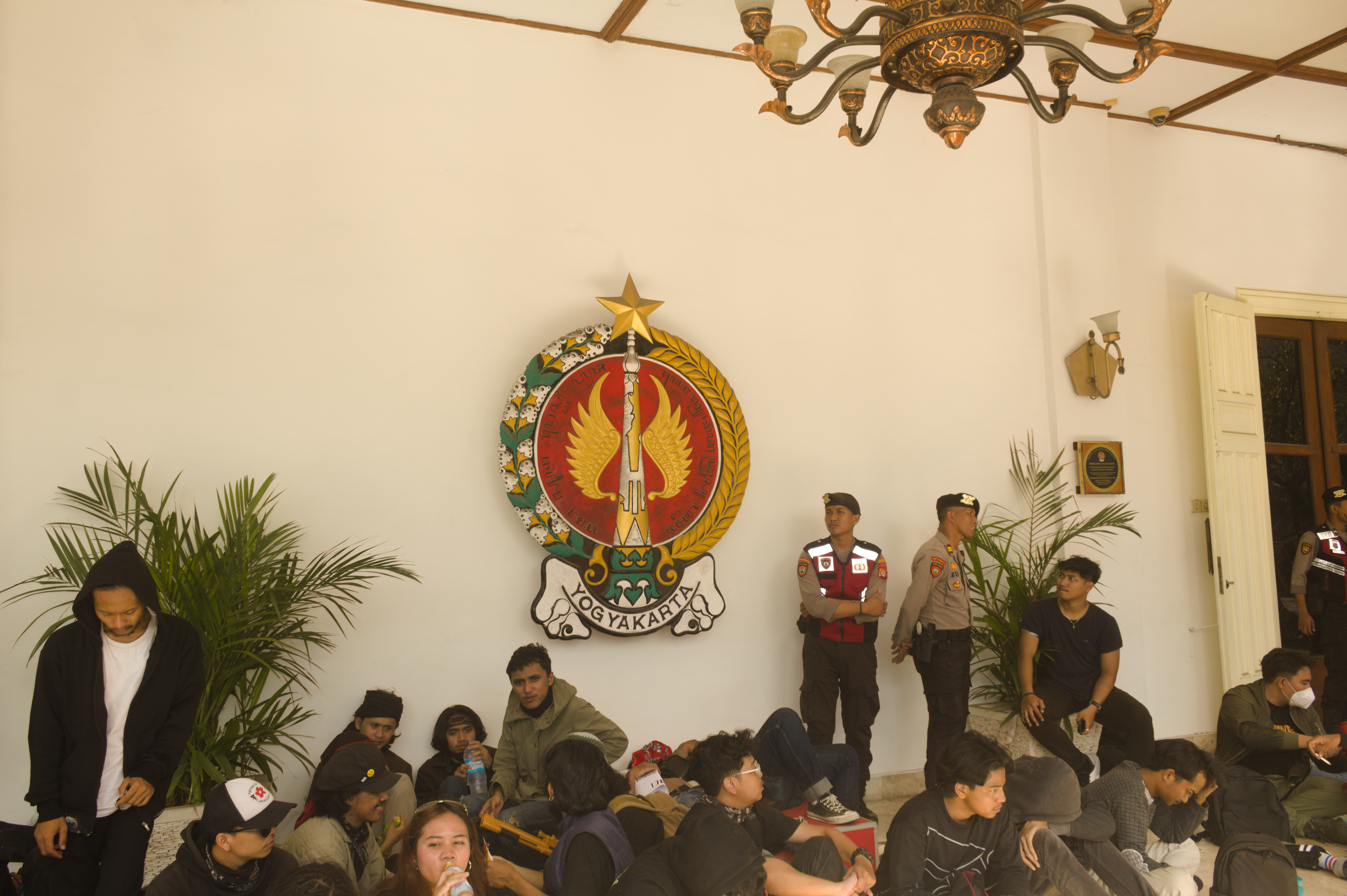
Police monitoring the demonstration at the Regional House of Representatives building of the Special Region of Yogyakarta, March 20, 2025.

The police asked the demonstrators in the yard of the DIY DPRD to disperse using loudspeakers. The demonstrators asked for permission to stay until morning, but the police only gave them one hour. Yogyakarta Police Chief Senior Commissioner Aditya Surya Dharma stated, "Please discuss it, we'll give you one hour." Meanwhile, representatives of the masses hoped that the demonstration could last all night with the concept of "camping together" to voice their opinions. However, the police stuck to their initial decision, limiting the time of the demonstration to 00.00 WIB. At around 00.40 WIB, the police deployed two Mobile Brigade (Brimob) tactical vehicles and dozens of riot police. Chaos ensued, with bottles and firecrackers being thrown at the police. Water cannons were used to push back the demonstrators. Meanwhile, outside the DIY DPRD complex, from the south side there was another group of people trying to approach the demonstrators rejecting the TNI Law. This unidentified group in civilian clothes uttered various insults at the demonstrators rejecting the TNI Law who they considered to be the cause of the riot. A number of police personnel were seen blocking the group of residents so that they would not clash with the protesters who remained in front of the DPRD building. The police prevented a clash between the two groups. The Secretary of the DIY DPRD, Yudi Ismono, said he could not yet detail the total losses due to vandalism. The DIY DPRD building, which is a cultural heritage site, experienced extensive spray-painted graffiti, as well as an incident of burning garbage. Police remained on site to prevent further damage.

On 29 March, Indonesian Mothers' Voice held a protest at Titik Nol Kilometer Yogyakarta on Malioboro Street

On 15 April, hundreds of people who are members of the Ulama and Activist Defence Team (TPUA) came to the Faculty of Forestry, Universitas Gadjah Mada (UGM), Sleman, Yogyakarta to ask for clarification on the alleged fake diploma of the 7th President of Indonesia, Joko Widodo. They gathered in front of Room 109 of the Faculty of Forestry UGM around 07:45 a.m, including mothers. Not long after, four representatives of the protesters entered Room 109 of the Faculty of Forestry UGM to attend an audience with the rector regarding Jokowi's diploma. Meanwhile, Amien Rais was also among the crowd. He said that UGM's explanation of Jokowi's previous diploma did not prove enough and instead seemed to be spinning.

==== Surakarta ====
In Surakarta, students started walking backward from Makutho Monument at 14:00 WIB, and arrived front of the Surakarta DPRD building at Adi Sucipto Road at 15:40 WIB, on 19 February. The protesters also carried various anti-government banners and burned used tires. Their action was guarded by hundreds of joint personnel from the military, police, and the Department of Transportation. Coordinator Syaiful interpreted that a backward walk represents that "the nation is experiencing a setback". They threatened if their six demands were not realised in three days, they would return with a larger number of protesters.

On 19 March, hundreds of Sebelas Maret University (UNS) students held a protest rally at the Surakarta City Council. The students unfurled white banners with various writings, such as ‘Return TNI to Barracks’, as well as the hashtags #hapuskanRUUTNI, #TolakRUUTNI, #Pukulmundur, and #Supremasisipil. The President of BEM UNS 2025 said that his side hoped that DPRD Surakarta could convey their aspirations to the central government not to pass the TNI Law. He said that the TNI Law could bring back New Order Volume 2.

On 20 March, students and the public participated in the demonstration against the ratification of the TNI Law wearing all black clothes. The demonstration carried the theme Solo Raya Menggugat Indonesia Gelap Jilid 2 and made a long march from Al Muhlihun Mosque Surakarta to the Surakarta DPRD Building, which is about 300 metres away. The action coordinator said the demonstration at the Surakarta DPRD building was carried out as a form of disappointment over the passing of the revised TNI Law by the House of Representatives.

On 16 April, protesters from the Ulama and Activist Defence Team (TPUA) who wanted to see the authenticity of the diploma of the 7th President, Joko Widodo, came to his residence. The atmosphere was heated around Jokowi's residence when the TPUA camp met with dozens of Jokowi's supporters who had been waiting since morning and then subsided after security officers, both the police on guard and the Paspampres, allowed representatives to meet with Jokowi. There were at least four representatives who met Jokowi inside his residence, one of whom was TPUA Deputy, Chair Rizal Fadillah. He confirmed this when met by reporters after the meeting with Jokowi. He said the purpose of their visit to Jokowi's residence was not only to stay in touch in the atmosphere of Eid al-Fitr like other residents, but also to connect with Jokowi's diploma. The meeting lasted about 30 minutes. However, Jokowi did not show his diploma to them.

Prior to the meeting with Ulama and Activist Defence Team TPUA, Joko Widodo invited dozens of media crews including CNN Indonesia to enter his residence. However, Jokowi did not allow media crews to take pictures during the meeting and was asked to collect mobile phones and cameras. He showed his diplomas from elementary to high school, and also his undergraduate degree at UGM. The UGM diploma shown by Jokowi is very similar to the image circulating on social media. However, Jokowi was reluctant to confirm the similarity of the circulating diploma photo with his own.

==== Other protests in Java ====
In Serang, students organised a sit-in at the Ciceri intersection on 20 March 2025.

In Bogor, students illegally held a protest on 27 March. They blocked a road; attacked policemen with stones, firecrackers and Molotov cocktails; and burned water barriers. As a result, several stalls and Kujang Monument were damaged, and 13 protesters were arrested by the police. Their actions were also condemned as 'anarchist'. On 21 August, a group of students clashed against the Municipal Police at Bogor City Hall soon after burning an effigy, causing the protesters to vandalise the building. They originally demanded Bogor Regional Public Hospital to pay off its debts and increase their service, while also questioning the responsibility behind the death of a heavy machine operator at the Galuga landfill. Following this incident, the Cultural Heritage Expert Team (TACB) of Bogor reported the vandalisers to the police.

In Bekasi, on 25 March, a protest was held at front of the Bekasi DPRD building. However, it caused damages on the building and 2 police cars were vandalised. As a result, 8 protesters were arrested by the police (2 of them were already graduated and the rest were students).

In Karawang, a protest that was held on 25 March ended up with clashes between protesters and authorities along with pro-government paramilitary groups. The regional DPRD building was damaged during the protest. During the protest it was widely reported that police officers were caught hijacking the ambulance carrying the wounded protesters to de re-routed to the police station instead of hospital, arresting 5 wounded protesters and 2 paramedics. According to Cakra Legal Aid Institute, 15 people were missing during the event (and possibly also arrested by the police).

In Sukabumi, on 20 March, students and civilians began to protest front of Sukabumi DPRD building at 15:00 WIB. They managed to penetrate through installed barbed wires, but also burning used tires and involving in clashes with policemen. The protest was also attended by Yana Fajar, an academician from the Muhammadiyah University of Sukabumi. During the event, a journalist from Metro TV, Apit Haeruman, was intimidated and strangled by several student protesters. As a result, one protester suffered nasal fracture, and the investigation of assaults during Sukabumi protest is currently underway.

In Bandung, on 17 February, the students protested front of the building of West Java DPRD. One participant, Ainul Mardhyah, from National Students' Front, expressed that her affirmation scholarship was being cut 10%. A daughter of migrant workers in Malaysia, she also concerned about the protection of Indonesian migrant workers. Protests later resumed on 21 February, with participants shouting revolusi 'revolution' and burning used tires. They also attempted to penetrate barbed wires. As of 24 March 25 people are confirmed to be wounded after clashes with police forces and pro-government paramilitary group. The building of Hana Bank office was also burned down by the crowd, and an investigation by the local police is currently underway. Faqih Rohman Syafei, a journalist from Kompas.com, was beaten down by the protesting crowd after being accused as an undercover agent of State Intelligence Agency. The protest was resumed at Gedung Merdeka by Papua Students' Alliance on 7 April 2025.

In Tasikmalaya, on 19 February, more than 100 student protesters attempted to enter the building of Tasikmalaya DPRD to voice their aspirations. However, security forces carried out the entrance gate. During heavy rains, jostlings occurred until the gate collapsed, then, a water cannon started to fire on protesters. They began to throw away various hard objects into police cars, causing the glass on the security post to shatter. Regional police chief Moh. Faruk Rozi invited them into dialogue, and finally agreed to enter the building. Three policemen and one student were injured during the event.

In Indramayu, students under the alliance of students' unions of Indramayu protested at the building of Indramayu DPRD. They attempted to smash the entrance doors of the building, causing jostlings with policemen. They also burned used tires and threw away objects to officers, due to being annoyed that the speaker of Indramayu DPRD could not meet them. Few moments later, they were able to meet the speaker and representatives of DPRD members.

In Cirebon, protests occurred front of the building of Cirebon DPRD. They were later able to enter the building, after penetrating barbed wires and police guards. Then, they challenged the deputy speaker of Cirebon DPRD, Fitrah Malik, and head of Commission I, Agung Supirno, to debate with the protesters. The protesters threatened them to resign from their positions, if unable to answer their questions. On 24 March, dozens of students under Cirebon Is Suing Alliance arrived to protest at the same building at 14:00 WIB, postponed from the original schedule at 09:00 WIB. The protesters clashed with policemen, before later being allowed for dialogues with several parliament members. However, the protests intensified when they attempted to lower the national flag on the hall. It was followed by firecracker and Molotov cocktail attacks, and vandalism.

In Brebes, on 28 March, students held a protest at front of the Brebes DPRD building. They were later invited by deputy speaker Iqbal Tanjung for a discussion.

In Purwokerto, students under Community Union in Motion (Semarak) organised a long march from Prof. KH. Saifuddin Zuhri State Islamic University towards the Banyumas Regent Office. They carried several banners, among them have inscriptions such as Sebuah Kekecewaan Republik Indonesia 1 Presiden Berbagai Insiden ('A Disappointment of the Republic of Indonesia, One President Full of Incidents') and Bikin Kebijakan Buat Oligarki Terus Ndasmu ('Continue to Create Policies for the Oligarchy, Your Head!'). They also repeatedly chanted "Ganyang Fufufafa" ('Crush Fufufafa'). Protests resumed on 21 March, with students carrying a banner with inscription Anti Rezim Fasis Prabs 'Against Prabowo's Fascist Regime', and spread cow dung on soldiers guarding Military District Commando 0701.

In Semarang, students under the Alliance of Students' Unions of Greater Semarang organised a protest front of the Semarang City Hall on 18 February. Thousands of students arrived at 14:30 WIB, and organised a long march from Pemuda Road into front of the building of Central Java DPRD. They also carried banners critical of the government, and chanted "Ganyang Fufufafa". After attempts to meet the DPRD members failed, and a representative came instead, the protesters mocked to enter again into the building, and threw away cow dung on the gate as a sense of their annoyance. Field coordinator, Evan Surya from Diponegoro University, rated the initial performance of Prabowo's government −100 from 100. Previously, it was planned at 9:00 WIB and projected to be attended by 1,600 people. As another nationwide protest against the Armed Forces law being held across the country on 20 March, police threw tear gas and arrested 5 people, 3 of them students, in front of the governor office and DPRD building in Semarang. One student from the Soegijapranata Catholic University, was beaten down and arrested by the police, but was later released at 21:00 WIB and rushed to the Kariadi Hospital.

In Kudus, around 70 students under Muslim Students' Association (HMI), from Kudus, Rembang and Jepara, organised a protest front of the building of Kudus DPRD. They also carried banners and other attributes.

In Rembang, Indonesian National Student Movement (GMNI) and Muslim Students' Association (HMI) held a protest in front of Rembang DPRD, 8 April 2025. They initially attempted to infiltrate the building after no member could meet them, but their actions were halted after being found by DPRD secretariat. Meanwhile, parents of Hamim Muarif, the chairman of GMNI Rembang branch, were reportedly intimidated by TNI members. This prompted the participants to move the protest to Military District Commando 0720/Rembang.

In Tuban, on 26 March, students from Cipayung Plus alliance protested front of the Tuban DPRD building. They also burned used tires, and carried a pocong featuring the face of Indonesian president, later to be given to several figures of the legislature, including its speaker.

In Bojonegoro, hundreds of black-clothed protesters from Veteran Is Calling Alliance held a protest front of the Bojonegoro DPRD building. They additionally gave speech and vandalised the building. The protesters attempted to enter Bojonegoro DPRD at 17:00 WIB, leading into clashes with guarding policemen. The police finally dispersed the crowd with a water cannon. As a result, dozens of protesters were injured due to being trampled, meanwhile, 4 others were arrested.

In Kediri, on 17 February, around 60 students from Brawijaya University organised a sit-in front of the Kediri DPRD building. They arrived using motorcycles at 14:15 WIB and carried several banners and posters rejecting the streamlining policy under the Presidential Instruction Number 1 of 2025. After an hour, they met Deputy Speaker Sudjono Teguh Widjaja to discuss with the protesters. On 27 March 2025, protesters from Sekartaji Alliance, consisting of various student and labour elements, held a protest at Kediri DPRD, wearing black clothing and white ribbon on their left hands. By evening, the protest went chaotic for unclear reasons, and 2 protesters were injured. Also, 26 protesters were arrested by the police, but later released after receiving assistance by Al-Amin Legal Aid Institute. The violence during the protest triggered condemnation by KontraS.

In Blitar Regency, on 24 March, students clashed with policemen at the Blitar DPRD building, after failed to meet the parliament members.

In Jombang, on 29 March, 200 students held a long march at Jombang branch of Indonesian Journalists Association, and arrived at 16:00 WIB duringrains to hold a protest front of Jombang DPRD. The protest was marked by burning of used tires and black clothing, but they also carried various banners. During the protesters were met with two parliament members. Coordinator Muhammad Hidayatulluh announced that they would hold a meeting with the speaker of DPRD next day.

In Lamongan, on 17 February, students under Joko Tingkir Lamongan Students' Union organised protests at Lamongan regional government and Lamongan DPRD buildings. They were seen carrying flags and banners with inscriptions Indonesia Gelap ('Dark Indonesia') and Lamongan Memanggil ('Lamongan Is Calling'). On 27 March, students protested at Lamongan DPRD, they were seen sticking posters, drawing on the roads, and burning used tires. The protest went chaotic at night, when the protesters clashed with policemen at KH. Ahmad Dahlan Road. They escaped into coffee shops and home yards to avoid the police chase, but later pushed into Lamongan Town Square intersection by the police. Following the event, 39 protesters were arrested, but immediately released to their families.

In Bondowoso, hundreds of students under Indonesian Muslim Students' Movement (PMII) protested front of the building of Bondowoso DPRD. They also carried banners and posters, burned used tires, and read the tahlil.

In Cirebon and Pekalongan, on 29 August, protestors burnt several parliamentary buildings. According to Detik.com, the Cirebon parliament's office equipment was looted by protestors whilst police dispersed protestors in Pekalongan.

=== Nusa Tenggara Islands ===
In Denpasar, students under Bali Is Not Silent Alliance arrived at the building of Bali Regional House of Representatives on 11:30 WITA, and carried a banner with inscription Tut Wuri Efisiensi, a play on Indonesian education motto Tut Wuri Handayani. Ten minutes later, they were invited into the building's wantilan (pavilion) by acting secretary I Gusti Ngurah Wiryanata to voice their demands. Students from Udayana University have announced plans for further protests on 31 March, following the emergence of an agreement letter between Indonesian Army and the university, which was perceived as a military attempt to intervene the education sector.

In Mataram, students' union of the University of Mataram (BEM UNRAM), stated that they would participate in protest on 20 February with president of the university's student union already departed to Jakarta to coordinate the protest with the one led by BEM SI. They carried a bier as a form of protest. On 25 March, hundreds of students under West Nusa Tenggara Students and Society Alliance, protested front of the West Nusa Tenggara DPRD building. Speaker of the legislature, Baiq Isvie Rupaeda, subsequently announced that their demands would be delivered to the central DPR.

In Kupang, students gathered in front off East Nusa Tenggara governor office, also known as Sasando Building to protest the budget cuts for education. On 24 March, students from Cipayung Plus Alliance protested front of the East Nusa Tenggara DPRD building.

=== Kalimantan ===
In Pontianak, on February, dozens of students arrived at West Kalimantan DPRD for protesting. On 27 March, several students from Panca Bhakti University protested at West Kalimantan DPRD, but their demands were later responded by several parliament members.

In Palangka Raya, students from various local universities, mainly University of Palangka Raya (UPR), Muhammadiyah Palangka Raya University, State Islamic Institute of Palangka Raya, and State Hindu Institute of Palangka Raya, protested at the building of Central Kalimantan DPRD. They danced with Prabowo's campaign song Oke Gas 2 by Richard Jersey, as a form of political satire, while also burning used tires. Some protesters also shouted out Adili Jokowi ('Bring Jokowi into Justice'). The students threatened the speaker of the Central Kalimantan province's parliament (DPRD) a second wave of protest in Monday with bigger mass if their demands are not met.

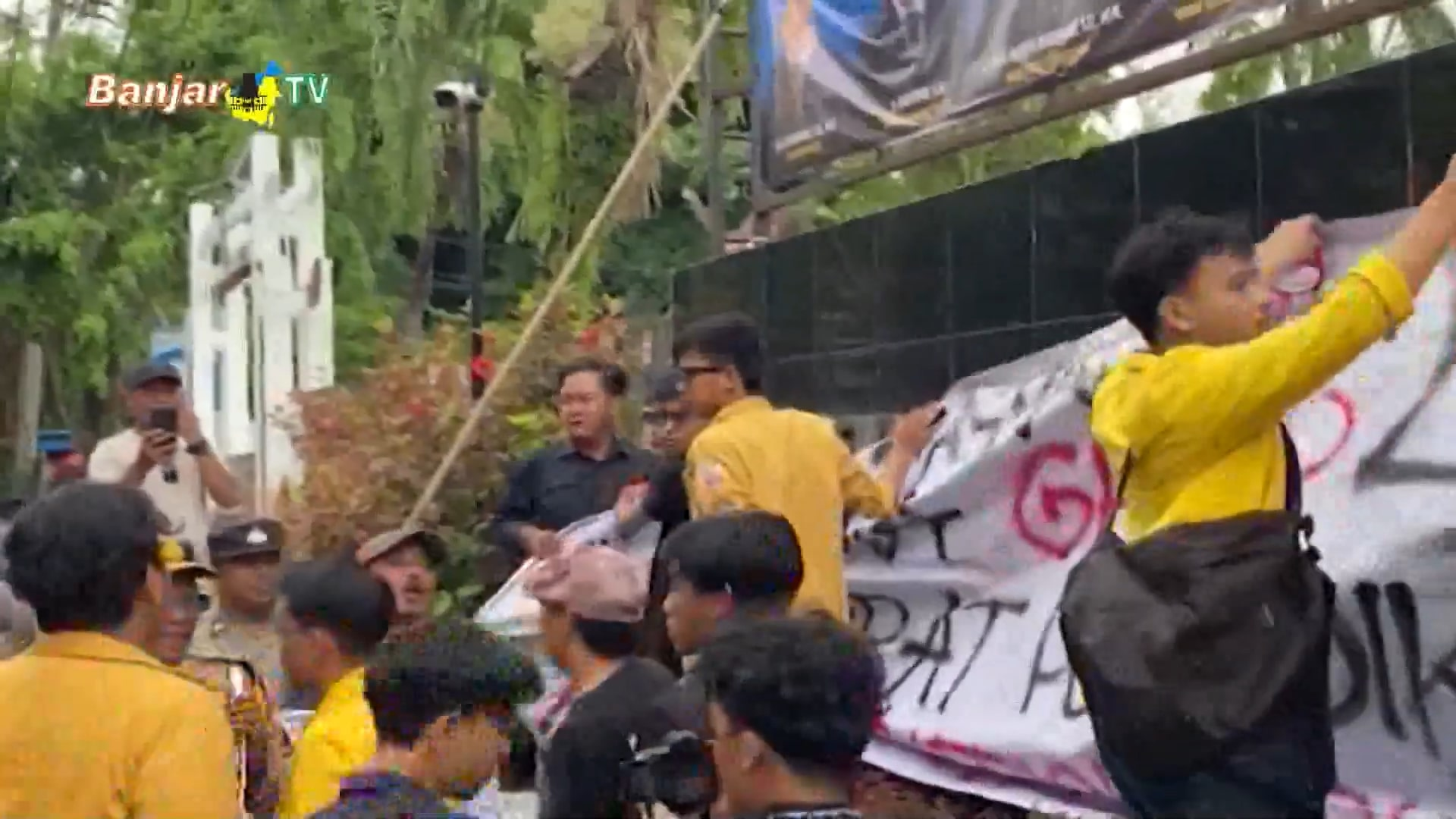
Ratu Samban University (UNRAS) Students hassle with the police after attempting to plaster anti-government banners on the South Kalimantan DPRD, 18 February 2025

In Banjarmasin, hundreds of students, as well as the civil society, protested in front of the building of South Kalimantan DPRD. They criticised high public approval rates of the government by various survey results, and called them not in accordance with the realities.

In Kotabaru, on 30 March, dozens of people held a protest front of the headquarters of Military District Commando 1004, in support of the Armed Forces Law.

In Balikpapan, students under the Students' Alliance of the Oil City started a long march from four-way intersection at Balikpapan Plaza towards Balikpapan DPRD. After arriving at the building, it was marked by jostlings between protesters and policemen at the entrance door. They additionally criticised policies by the city's local government. The police dispersed them after exceeding the limit at 18:00, and later arrested 6 protesters, suspected of being provocateurs and against the officers.

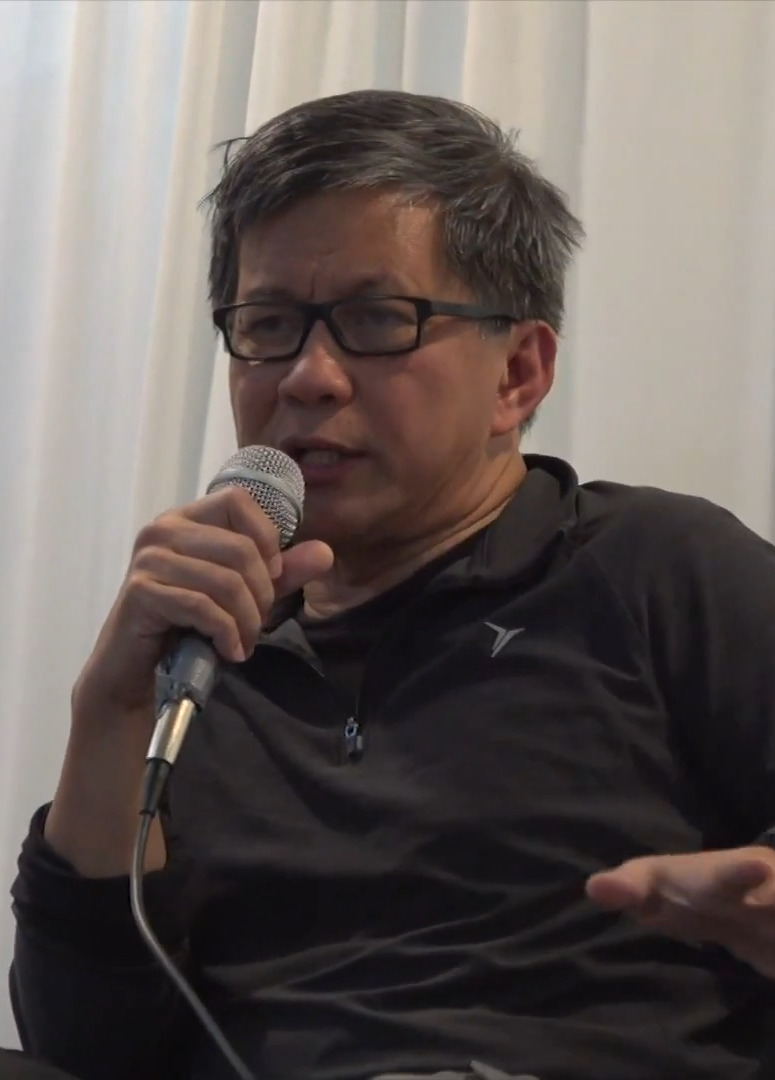
Rocky Gerung in 2020

In Samarinda, thousands of students protested in front of the East Kalimantan DPRD building. Political commentator Rocky Gerung gave a speech to motivate the protesters. The protesters clashed with the local police after attempting to enter the building, and they fired a water cannon on the protesters. As a result, the protesters were treated back to Samarinda Islamic Center Mosque. On 21 March, hundreds of students from various organisations protested front of East Kalimantan DPRD. They scattered flowers as a symbolism for dying democracy, and carried a banner in opposition to the ratification of revised Armed Forces Law.

In Tarakan, on 21 March 2025, Civil Supremacy Alliance, consisting of 11 students' institutions, held a protest in front of Tarakan DPRD during rains. It was also marked with burning of used tires. On 26 March, the alliance announced for further demonstrations, after DPRD did not respond to the ultimatum issued by them previous day. Previously, they held a consolidation meeting attended by 7 representatives from 5 students' organisations.

=== Sulawesi ===
==== Makassar ====
In Makassar, the following protests (except the protests in August) share very similar patterns, including burning used tires and blocking roads with a truck, effectively causing long traffic jams and creating tensions between protesters and drivers.

On 17 February, students protested at Perintis Kemerdekaan Road, effectively blocking the Trans-Sulawesi Road. They also burned used tires and held back a truck as a stage for protesters. A day later, students under AMPERA conducted protests at AP Pettarani Road, Rappocini. They also burned used tires and blocked the road with a container truck. Next day, students under Student Activists' Movement (GAM) also blocked the same road (AP Pettarani Road) with a truck and burned used tires. Another protest occurred at Sultan Alauddin Road, attended by students from Alauddin Islamic State University and carried various banners and pamphlets with critical messages. They also burned used tires.

Next day, Makassar Students' Alliance organised a protest under a flyover and then moved towards South Sulawesi DPRD building at Urip Sumoharjo Road. They also held two trucks as stages for the protests. Later, the protesters burned used tires, sang together "Buruh Tani" by Marjinal, and pulling the barbed wires. The protesters began to disperse at 19:05 WITA, and police chief of Makassar, Arya Perdana, claimed that their aspirations have arrived into South Sulawesi DPRD. However, as of 19:40 WITA, students from the State University of Makassar (UNM) and a group of drivers, were seen fighting each other using stones and bows. As a result, 6 people, accused of being provocateurs, were arrested by the local police while hiding within the campus of UNM, although they were later sent home by 04:00 WITA

On 24 February, protesters from 16 organisations, including student elements, arrived below the flyover of Urip Sumoharjo Road at 14:45 WITA They also wore ropes on their left hands and prepared other attributes, including banners and a loudspeaker. Protests started at 3:35 WITA, and used tires were burned during the event. They began to disperse at 17:00 WITA.

On 19 March, protesters under Muslim Students' Association (HMI) protested front of South Sulawesi DPRD at Urip Sumoharjo Road. They additionally burned used tires and gave a speech at middle of the road. The protesters finally began to disperse on 17:41 WITA after being accepted by parliament members.

On 5 August, students from the State University of Makassar held a protest under a flyover road at AP Pettarani Road. They were seen flying Jolly Roger flags (see #Background) and carrying posters containing their demands, deeming that the proposed revisions to the Criminal Procedure Law of Indonesia (KUHAP) are not transparent and involve little public participation. One motorcycle driver was forced to get off his motorcycle and almost being assaulted by protesters after attempting to infiltrate them. Another protest occurred at South Sulawesi DPRD building, and they finally dispersed on 16:30 WITA.

On 25 August, several alliances, including Makassar Democratic People's Federation and Contesting People's Union, as well as students from the Students' Union of State University of Makassar (UNM) and the Faculty of Law at the Islamic University of Indonesia, held protests at various places in Makassar. Among the locations include the buildings and headquarters of Makassar DPRD, South Sulawesi DPRD, Bank Sulselbar, Pertamina, RS Cahaya Medika, and the Alauddin-Pettarani Junction. They highlighted several corruption cases, which involved the construction project of a library in Pangkajene Islands, the main ideas of Bone Regency funds, and the corporate social responsibility funds from Bank Indonesia (BI) and Financial Services Authority (OJK)

==== Other cities in Sulawesi ====
In Palopo, non-governmental organisation Aspirasi held a protest front of Palopo mayor office on 29 March in support of Armed Forces Law.

In Kendari, students from Haluoleo University protested front of the building of Southeast Sulawesi DPRD, and 100 joint personnels were deployed to guard the protests. They rejected budget cuts in various sectors.

A still image of a student successfully overpowering a policeman in a duel atop a police truck in North Sulawesi became a rallying cry for continued protest, 20 March.

In Manado, the student protesters under North Sulawesi Movement Alliance organised a sit-in. They blocked the 17 Agustus Road, precisely front of Samsat Office, effectively causing traffic jams. Hundreds of personnels were deployed by local police at the North Sulawesi Governor's Office, then the protesters attempted to break the entrance gate, tearing apart several pieces of iron. They also burned a bier and used tires. After waiting for three hours, they were finally permitted to enter the governor's office by Head of National and Political Unity Body of North Sulawesi, Johny Suak. Later on 20 March, students under North Sulawesi Forward Alliance protested at North Sulawesi DPRD building. After being unable to meet parliament members, they infiltrated barricades installed by the police and clashed with them, causing damage within the building. Clashes between protesters and policemen began at 05:30 p.m., and three protesters were arrested during the event.

In Palu, hundreds of students gathered in front of the Central Sulawesi DPRD, mainly from Tadulako University. The protest almost turned violent with students trying to get through the building gate. One student was injured in the head as the result of the commotion.

In Mamuju, West Sulawesi, protests also occurred in Simpang Lima road held by dozens of students who demanded the free nutritious meal program to be evaluated.

In Bone, a demonstration rejecting the increase in the Rural and Urban Land and Building Tax (PBB-P2) rates ended in chaos. The demonstration prompted the Bone Regency Government to temporarily decide to postpone the 65% increase in PBB-P2 rates. The demonstration, escorted by 1,000 joint Indonesian army and police personnel, took place at the Bone Regent's office on 19 August. The demonstration, organized by the Bone People's Alliance (Aliansi Rakyat Bone), initially proceeded peacefully during the day. However, it then turned anarchic, the demonstrators threw firecrackers and molotov cocktails, which were responded to by security officers by throwing tear gas, while carrying out sweeps and forced dispersal.

=== Maluku Islands ===
In Ambon, students from the State Islamic Institute of Ambon (IAIN Ambon), with their almamaters, protested in front of the Maluku DPRD building. The students rejected the free meal program and demanded the Presidential Instruction Number 1 of 2025 repealed while stating what Indonesia needs is free education.

In Ternate, hundreds of students gathered in front off the Ternate mayor office building and protested the free meal program by the government. The students laid out several demands such as free education, to repeal the Presidential Instruction Number 1 of 2025, allowances for teachers and university lecturers, as well as local issues such as demanding 50% reserved employment quota for women in the city government, rejecting land reclamation program in the city, and concern about the city's piped water infrastructure. The protest later turned violent with two journalists reportedly assaulted by the city's Municipal Police. The next day on 25 February 2025, journalists and media workers in the city held a separate demonstration condemning the assault. Alliance of Independent Journalists and Indonesian Union of Journalist's North Maluku chapter also condemned the incident as against freedom of press and a breach of laws.

In Morotai Island, protest was held predominantly by Pasifik University (UNIPAS) in front off the regent's office and parliament building (DPRD). The students brought a banner written "Republik oligarki, Indonesia gelap, Malut butuh pendidikan gratis" (Oligarchic republic, dark Indonesia, North Maluku needs free education). The students criticized the free meal programs is ineffective and what Indonesian students need is free education.

=== Papua ===
In Manokwari, on 10 April, students' union of the University of Papua (UNIPA) held demonstrations at three separate places: the UNIPA campus, Mansinam hostel, and Makalo stop signal. The participants were guarded by Manokwari regional police, and they also carried several banners, such as UU TNI mempercepat genosida dan ekosida di Papua ('Armed Forces Law hastens genocide and ecocide in Papua'). During the event, two protesters were arrested by the police. The crowd negotiated with West Papua DPRD, West Papua People's Council, and the police.

In Wamena, thousands of students held a demonstration as a form of rejection of the government's free nutritious meal program on Monday, 17 February 2025. The students rejected the program, stating that what they need is instead free education and improvement on facilities. It is estimated that around 3,500 students participated, consisting of middle school, high school and university students. Thousands of students came from Wamena, Jayawijaya Regency and Yahukimo Regency, based on the police information. A riot occurred at around 09.00 WIT, when the crowd moved towards the Menara Salib located in front of the Jayawijaya Regent's office and took place on Hom-Hom Road, several hundred meters from the Jayawijaya regent's office.

In Paniai, thousands of students from all levels (elementary, middle school, high School and vocational school) held a demonstration against the free nutritious meal (MBG) program on Monday, 24 February 2025. They went to the Paniai Regent's Office in Madi Village, East Paniai District and asked the government to prioritize free education.

In Deiyai, a Free Nutritious Meal (MBG) protest was held and attended by thousands of students from dozens of schools. They carried out a long towards the Deiyai regent's office. Wearing elementary, middle and high school uniforms, the students walked from the Thomas Adii Football Field at around 09.30 WIT to the regent's office.

In Jayapura, a protest action by students of the Cenderawasih University was carried out on Wednesday, 26 February 2025. They delivered their aspirations directly to the Papuan House of Representatives regarding the Law on the Indonesian National Army and demanded the repeal of the law. On 7 April, students who are members of the central leadership committee of the Independent Forum of West Papua Students (FIM-WP) conducted a demonstration against Freeport Indonesia at Ekspo Waena and Perumnas III Waena, Heram District. This peaceful protest started from the Cenderawasih University campus and moved towards the Perumnas III taxi round. However, the protest was forcibly dispersed by joint TNI-Polri officers.

In Nabire, peaceful demonstration held by protesters who reject PT Freeport Indonesia. The protesters organised a long march to the office of the Central Papua Provincial House of Representatives. Unfortunately, the police forbade it because it would disturb public order. The demonstration lasted until it was forcibly dispersed.

=== Overseas ===
The earlier overseas protest were organised by group of Indonesian students studying at Columbia University in New York City under the name of Jong Columbia on 21 February from 16:00 WIB until 18:00 WIB in New Residence Hall, Teachers College, Columbia University which gathered more than 100 students. At the same time the leaders of Indonesian Students Union in Japan, Malaysia, and The Netherlands published an open letter expressing their solidarity with the student union protesters back home. The Indonesian diaspora in Germany planned solidarity protests at the Brandenburg Gate, Berlin, on 1 March. The Indonesian diaspora in Australia organised solidarity protests at the State Library Victoria, Melbourne, on the same day. Indonesian students in Columbia University would later return to protest against the revision of Armed Forces law in front of Teachers College.

After the announced increase in housing allowance followed by the killing of motorcycle taxi (ojol) driver Affan Kurniawan, several more protests occurred in multiple countries. In the United States, more than 500 protesters gathered under the name of Amerika Bergerak (previously Jong Columbia) between 4 and 6 September in New York City and several other cities. In Germany, protesters gathered in late August and early September in Aachen, Berlin, Bonn, Hannover, and Cologne. Indonesian diaspora in the Netherlands held a demonstration on 4 September 2025, by marching from ISS at the Erasmus University Rotterdam to the Indonesian Embassy in The Hague. This action was intended as a form of solidarity for Affan Kurniawan, as well as all victims of state violence.

== Reactions ==
=== Domestic ===
==== Protesters ====
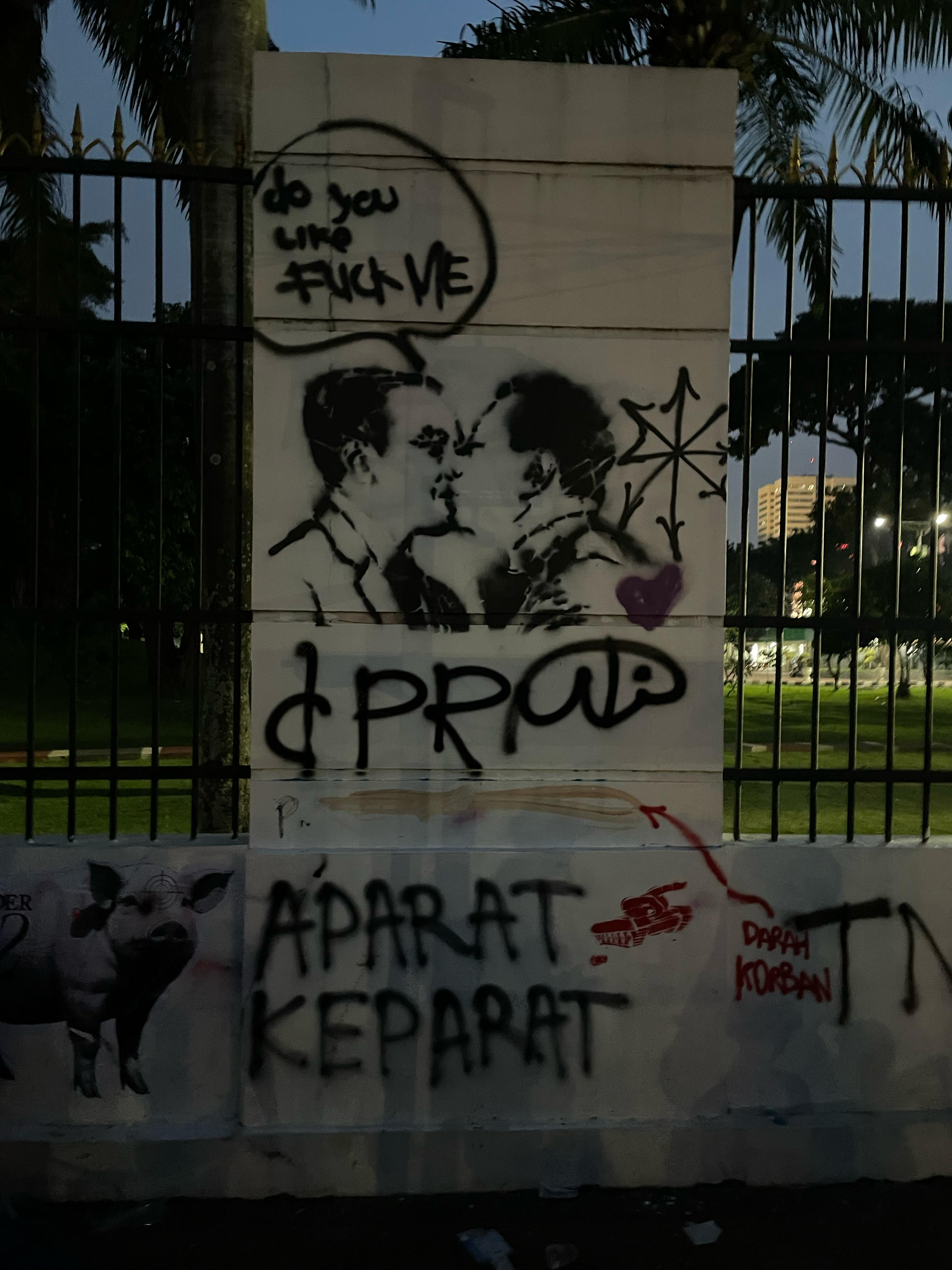
Graffiti on the DPR walls during the 2025 Indonesian protest mimicking Fraternal Kiss. Recreating this image is a clause for arrest.

A lecturer of the Faculty of Economy and Business at the University of Indonesia (UI), Rizki Nauli Siregar posted the image above but with black background, while also supporting students in her class to participate in the protests. A lecturer of the Faculty of Social and Political Sciences at Gadjah Mada University (UGM), Subarsono, stated that a political demonstration is a sign of living democracy. Another lecturer of Faculty of Social and Political Sciences at UGM, Muchtar Habibi, claimed that the protests could be strengthened by widening its participation. Professor at Airlangga University, Henri Subiakto viewed the protests not just as a spontaneous movement, but also as a form of accumulation of their disappointment of political condition in Indonesia. He later agreed with Mahfud MD's statement that 'Indonesia is still dark'. Academic and historian Andi Achdian viewed them as a shock for Prabowo's government.

Rocky Gerung viewed that the protests were not just an expression of pessimism, but also as a reflection of the actual condition. He also later criticized Prabowo's response to the protests as insufficient and further highlighted Prabowo's rhetorics that continuously praised Jokowi as a sign of his undue influence on him. The fan club of South Korean boy band NCT, NCTzen, announced their support for the protesters, and they would provide free foods, drinks, and medical needs through crowdfunding (see #Jakarta). Fan club of another South Korean boy band Super Junior also similarly proposed such.

==== Government ====
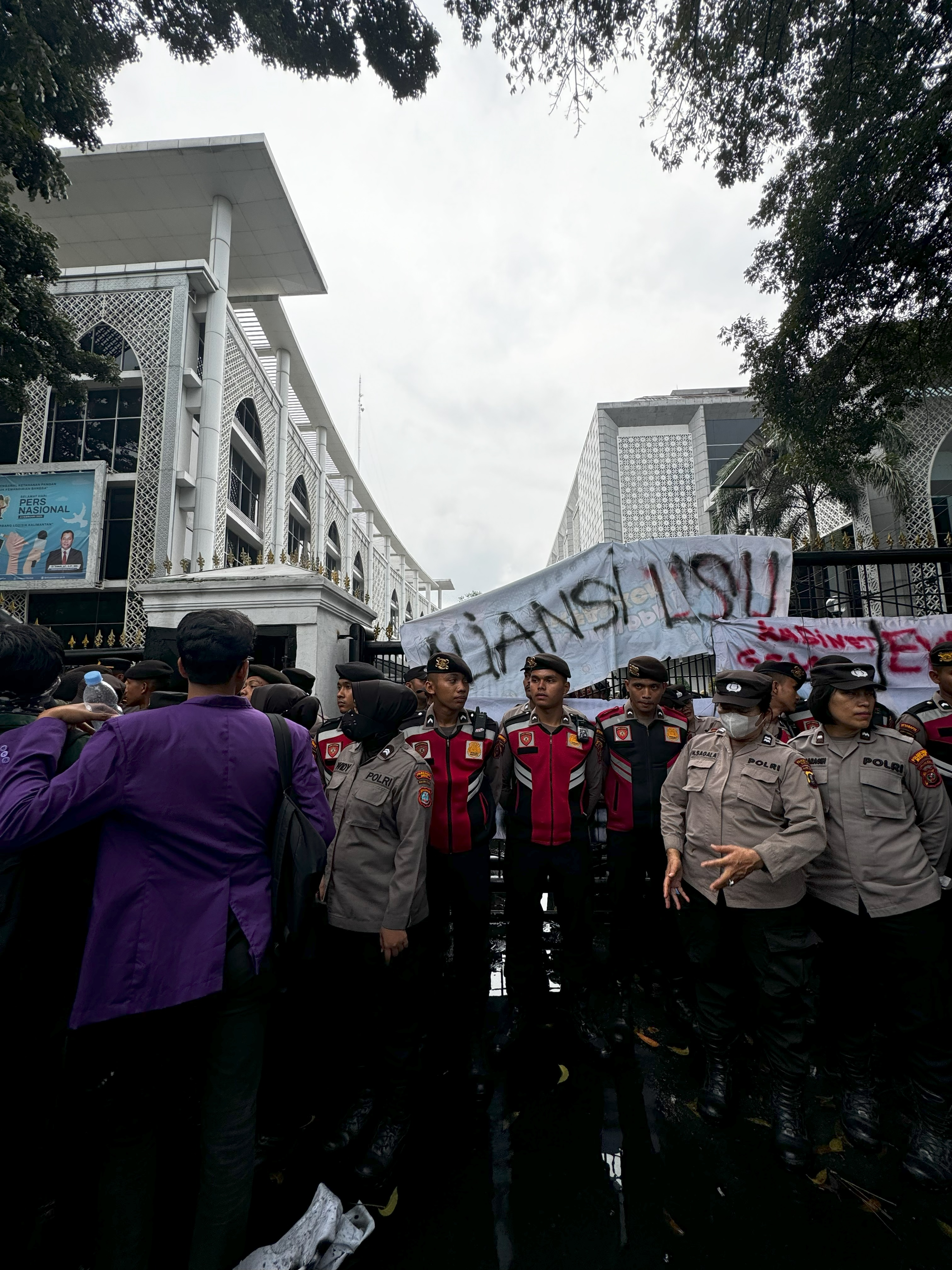
Police stand guard at the Medan DPRD

During an exclusive interview on 7 April 2025, president Prabowo Subianto called out the demonstrations as a 'provocation', and alleged that foreign parties (such as USAID) funded them. On 1 September, he also mentioned that he would confront "mafias" responsible for allegedly stirring up protests.

Head of the Presidential Communication Office, Hasan Nasbi, confirmed amidst the protests that funds allocated to the colleges, Kartu Indonesia Pintar for college, and scholarships will not be cut. Minister of the State Secretariat, Prasetyo Hadi, responded that Indonesia "is not really dark" as the slogan suggests, and called for the students to be optimistic. Vice Minister of Higher Education, Science, and Technology, Fauzan asked the student protesters to increase their intellectual abilities. The spokesman for the Presidential Communication Office, Adita Erawati, confirmed that a few demands presented by the protesters have been answered by the government, such as tuition fees not being increased nor scholarships being discontinued. Fellow spokesman Ujang Komarudin responded that Indonesia is still 'bright', not 'dark' as the slogan suggests. He also confirmed that there would be no cuts to scholarships, tuition fees would be not raised, and free health check would continue.

The speaker of People's Consultative Assembly (MPR), Ahmad Muzani, judged the public reaction during the protests as excessive and contraproductive. Deputy speaker of MPR, Eddy Soeparno called for the students to be optimistic and claimed that pessimism only brings the situation into a stalemate. The deputy speaker of House of Representatives (DPR), Adies Kadir, regarded the demonstrations as a form of creativity by the students to voice their aspiration. Luhut Binsar Pandjaitan, Chairman of the National Economic Council (DEN), responded to the #IndonesiaGelap hashtag, which was used by student demonstrators protesting various government policies. He argued that Indonesia has been progressing well, despite certain shortcomings, which he noted are not unique to the country but are also experienced by other nations, including the United States. Luhut rejected the notion that Indonesia is in a dire state and that the government is progressing well. He stated that the protesters are 'dark', and not Indonesia.

Anticipating the coordinated nationwide protests on 20 February which coincides with inauguration of regional heads elected from 2024 Indonesian local elections, Indonesian National Police (Polri) urged students to not stage any protests in the vicinity of the state palace or disrupt the inauguration ceremony.

Deputy speaker of the DPR, Sufmi Dasco Ahmad, viewed the protests against the Armed Forces Law as normal in a democratic country. Regarding the 25 August protest at the Parliamentary Complex, the Deputy Speaker of the Commission II at DPR, Aria Bima did not found any problem with it and instead called for protests if necessary.

==== Censorship and repression ====
CCTV footage showing members of the TNI intimidating and spying on KontraS's main office at night following the revision of the TNI Law.

The government's reaction has also been marred by censorship, mainly targeting journalists and creative industry workers. It was widely reported that the Indonesian new wave duo Sukatani, who wrote a song criticising the police forces, was intimidated, and was later forced to make an apology video as part of the intimidation. American music critic Anthony Fantano condemned the repression, describing the situation as being "not good". Amnesty International also urged the Indonesian National Police to investigate the intimidation case. On X, a video surfaced showing a foreign citizen journalist being apprehended by police for "not having a permit".

There were also incidents of doxing of journalists following the protests at Jakarta on 21 February, causing condemnation by Legal Journalists' Union (Iwakum). CNN Indonesia, which is under the umbrella of Trans Media, was under public scrutiny for making two discrediting headlines against the protesters. In response to the headlines, two CNN Indonesia journalists were doxed by social media users sympathetic to the protesters, and several others called for a boycott of Trans Media-affiliated outlets.

After the storming of Fairmont Hotel, Commission for Missing Persons and Victims of Violence (KontraS) reported being terrorised by unknown assailants. KontraS vice coordinator Andrie Yunus stated that the unknown individuals had been frequently visiting their office and three KontraS staff members had received intimidating phonecalls.

Prior to the ratification of the Armed Forces law amendment, the parliament building and its surrounding areas were heavily guarded by armed forces and police forces.

Several media outlets in Indonesia reportedly received intimidation from the government officials. Kompas.com journalist Adhyasta Dirgantara reportedly received a death threat from the adjutant of the Commander of the Indonesian National Armed Forces after questioning the military's assault on the Tarakan police station. On 19 March, Indonesian magazine Tempo, known for its critical stance on the government, received a threat when a severed pig's head was delivered to its office in Palmerah, Jakarta, targeting journalist Francisca Christy Rosana. Editor-in-chief Setri Yasra condemned the incident as intimidation against freedom of the press. The next day, a journalist from the digital media outlet IDN Times was intimidated while filming the protest outside the parliament building. Several officers attempted to seize his mobile phone and motorcycle key. Two days later, Tempo received another anonymous package containing a box of six headless rats. As of 26 March, the Independent Journalists' Alliance had recorded that 18 journalists had become victims of violence during protests against the revision of Armed Forces Law. On 27 March, during the Jakarta protest, another journalist from Kompas.com, Rega Almutada, was intimidated and searched by individuals believed to be law enforcement in civilian clothing, while two other journalists from Russian media outlet RT were forced to turn off their cameras. In response to growing concerns over threats to press freedom, Hasan Nasbi, serving as Chief of the Presidential Communication Office, reaffirmed the government's commitment to upholding media independence. However, his remarks drew criticism on social media after he reportedly stated that Tempo should "cook the pig's head."

Additionally, there have been found incidents of intimidation against medical officers by policemen. Jakarta Legal Aid Institute alleged that the perpetrators would not be punished and the repressive approach had been intentionally designed inseparably from the police.

In May 2025, a female student of Bandung Institute of Technology was arrested after posting an AI generated meme depicting Joko Widodo and Prabowo Subianto doing a parody of My God, Help Me to Survive This Deadly Love painting, a kiss between Leonid Brezhnev and Erich Honecker. The arrest has triggered widespread condemnation on X.

==== Others ====
There were calls to translate the hashtag into various foreign languages, such as English, French, Arabic, Japanese, Mandarin, as well as few regional languages such as Javanese. Actor and singer Angga Yunanda posted a tweet in support of the protests. Through hashtag #ArtistBersuara ('Artists Speak Up'), digital artists on Twitter (X) also gave support for the protesters. Meanwhile, in response to March protests, mural artists have followed suit to criticise the government. CEO of Malaka Project, Ferry Irwandi, viewed the protests as a 'concern and love in order to make Indonesia better'.

Senior activist Faizal Assegaf through his Twitter account, gave full support for the protesters in 'the fight against injustice, arrogance, authoritarianism, and intimidation', and shouted Ganyang Jokowi ('Crush Jokowi'). He also countered Luhut's statement and called him not to intimidate the protesters. He later claimed that Prabowo's presidency could become 'meaningless' without Titiek Suharto, and this statement was criticised by the Love Prabowo Movement. Nusantara Youth Forum (FPN) called for his arrest at the headquarters of Polda Metro Jaya and Polri on 20 February.

The head of Love Prabowo Movement (GCP), Kurniawan stated that the student protests are a form of their aspiration, while also warning them not to be infiltrated by certain groups. Later, he alleged that the protests were an attempt to influence public opinion and to weaken Prabowo and the state by a handful of people. He also criticised that Faizal's statements could cause instability within the country. Dony Endrassanto viewed that Faizal's statements point to a coup d'État attempt and treason against the government. An opinion page on KedaiPena.com spread a claim that these protests constitute a "colour revolution" that orchestrated by the National Endowment for Democracy (NED). Meanwhile, Labour Party through its vice chairman Rivaldi Haryo Seno, issued a condemnation of police brutality during protests against revised Armed Forces Law.

Chairman of the Executive Council of Nahdlatul Ulama, Yahya Cholil Staquf, questioned what are the grounds to organise the protests. Vice secretary-general of Golkar Party, Sosialisman Hidayat Hasibuan, alleged that the protests are a form of political pressure on efforts by the government to arrest Hasto Kristiyanto, secretary-general of PDI-P. The head of media and opinion gathering at Golkar Party, Nurul Arifin, while suggesting that the protests could become a 'warning alert' for the government, she also reminded that ways to convey aspirations should be done constructively, not anarchistically. Mahfud MD claimed that there are so many 'bright' policies by the government, and need to be respected.

Chairman of Indonesian Chamber of Commerce and Industry, Anindya Bakrie viewed the protests as normal in a democratic country. Former secretary of the Ministry of State-Owned Enterprises, Said Didu, through his Twitter account, was confused why the #IndonesiaGelap protests focused on toppling down Prabowo, not to bring Jokowi to justice, while according to himself, the condition was caused by Jokowi's faults. Policy observer Gigin Praginanto, through his Twitter account, satirised that the protests' theme should be better changed from Indonesia Gelap to Indonesia Gelap Banget Nget Nget ('Indonesia Is Very, Very, Very Dark'). Actor Jefri Nichol said that he regretted for participate in a protest, the last one occurred in 2023, when he wasn't able to memorise any content of the chapters while being asked by a journalist.

There has been call from some internet users urging people to boycott celebrities and products that are supportive toward the government. Several state-owned enterprises such as Pertamina (which had found itself in a concurrent consumer boycott over allegations of adulterated fuel that surfaced during a corruption investigation) and three state-owned banks were also being targeted by the boycott movement. Few celebrities who are accidentally included in the list would later make clarification that they have nothing to do with the government programmes.

==== Businesses ====
After the death of ojol driver that caused riot around Mobile Brigade Corps headquarters in Kwitang, the nearby Atrium Senen mall announced via their social media that the mall will be temporarily shut down until further notice due to safety concern. Aside from Atrium Senen, another mall Senayan Park that was located near the MPR/DPR building announced that they only open the mall until 12:30 WIB on 29 August 2025 as well as announcement postponement of Impactnation Japan Festival to October which was scheduled to be held on 30–31 August 2025 at Senayan Park. Sarinah also reduced its operating hour to 16:00 WIB.

On 29 August, Several luxury brands in Plaza Senayan such as Dior, Fendi, Louis Vuitton, and others was seen emptying their stores displays in order to avoid lootings by angry mobs in aftermath of the 28 August riot that happened in front of the mall. Several luxury brands that opened their stores in Plaza Indonesia and Grand Indonesia malls which are located at Jalan M.H. Thamrin were also reportedly close their stores until further notice.

On 29 August 2025, there were image leaked on X that the Sudirman Central Business District in Jakarta that hosted the Greater Jakarta Metropolitan Regional Police headquarters has been heavily barricaded and sterilized on the second day of protest.

In Surabaya, Plaza Surabaya and its nearby shops were evacuated and was forced to close earlier after protesters stormed the Grahadi. Another mall in Surabaya, Tunjungan Plaza also stopped its operation earlier than usual, on 19:00 WIB due to unrest has reached Tunjungan Street where the mall is located.

=== International ===
==== Government ====
On 30 April, the United States Government issued a level 2 travel warning to Indonesia citing the possible protest that could turn violent. On 29 August, the Embassy of the United States, Jakarta issued alert to every American nationals in Indonesia in the wake of protest in front of the Mobile Brigade Corps headquarters in Kwitang which is located close to the U.S. embassy in Jakarta.

At the same time, the Taipei Economic and Trade Office in Jakarta issued a warning to all Taiwanese nationals in Indonesia to avoid protest areas.

The Canadian Government issued a travel warning to Indonesia in the light of the 28 August protest that turned violent.

The British Government updated its travel warning regarding Indonesia on 29 August warning every British nationals in Indonesia to avoid joining protests.

==== Others ====
International non-governmental organization Human Rights Watch (HRW) issued a statement on 19 March condemning the passing of military law amendment for threatening human rights in Indonesia. HRW also urged the parliament to drop the proposed amendment that would enable military to fill the civilian positions in the judiciary and state-owned enterprises.

Amnesty International via its representative in Indonesia also criticised the passing of the military law. Amnesty International then explained the danger of the military law that have been passed by the parliament and found misconducts within its passing. Earlier, Amnesty International secretary general Agnès Callamard visited Indonesia to evaluate the human rights situation in Indonesia.

Reporters Without Borders (RSF) through the director of its Asia-Pacific bureau, Cédric Alviani, has also issued condemnation of violence against journalists during Indonesian protests. Other international NGOs such as the German and Belgian chapters of International Federation of Action by Christians for the Abolition of Torture (ACAT), All Arakan Students' & Youths's Congress, Accountability Counsel, and Advocacy Forum-Nepal also published a joint statement condemning the passing of the amendment.

United Nations special rapporteur on the situation of human rights defenders Mary Lawlor expressed her concern about repression against the human rights NGOs during the protest and urge Indonesian government to ensure the voice of civic organisations are guaranteed without repression.

The US based military newspaper, Stars and Stripes, published a piece on 8 September 2025, argued that demonstrations in Indonesia, while framed as public anger over lawmakers' perks and economic pressures, were being orchestrated by entrenched elites resisting President Prabowo Subianto's anti-corruption reforms. It contends that the unrest reflects elite pushback against transparency and modernization, rather than grassroots democratic dissent.

== Impact ==
The student protests were featured as a front cover for the 18 February 2025 online edition of Lentera newspaper. As of 18 February, the rupiah began to weaken by 0.38% amidst the protests, however, the currency began to strengthen by 0.10% on 21 February. In response to the protests, there are currently attempts to counter #IndonesiaGelap on various social media platforms through the hashtag #IndonesiaCerah ('#BrightIndonesia'), originating from an Instagram account benpro.tv.

According to a senior researcher at Citra Institute, Efriza, predicted that then-Minister of Higher Education, Science, and Technology, Satryo Brodjonegoro could be replaced in a reshuffle due to the current student-led protests. This reshuffle was later confirmed and took effect on 19 February, with Brodjonegoro sacked from the position. Rocky Gerung, however, demanded to the government to give the explanation about his sacking, and claimed that the students' movement has been prepared months involving various experts.

On 21 March, seven students from the Faculty of Law at the University of Indonesia, submitted a judicial review on the revised Armed Forces Law to the Constitutional Court of Indonesia. They noticed numerous irregularities during its revision, deemed as 'unconstitutional' and 'hurried'. This move was soon followed by the Civil Society Coalition.

As the country situation doesn't show any sign of improvement, many young Indonesians have decided to flee the country to search for a new life as the government keep responding to the protest in bad manners.

=== Market decline ===
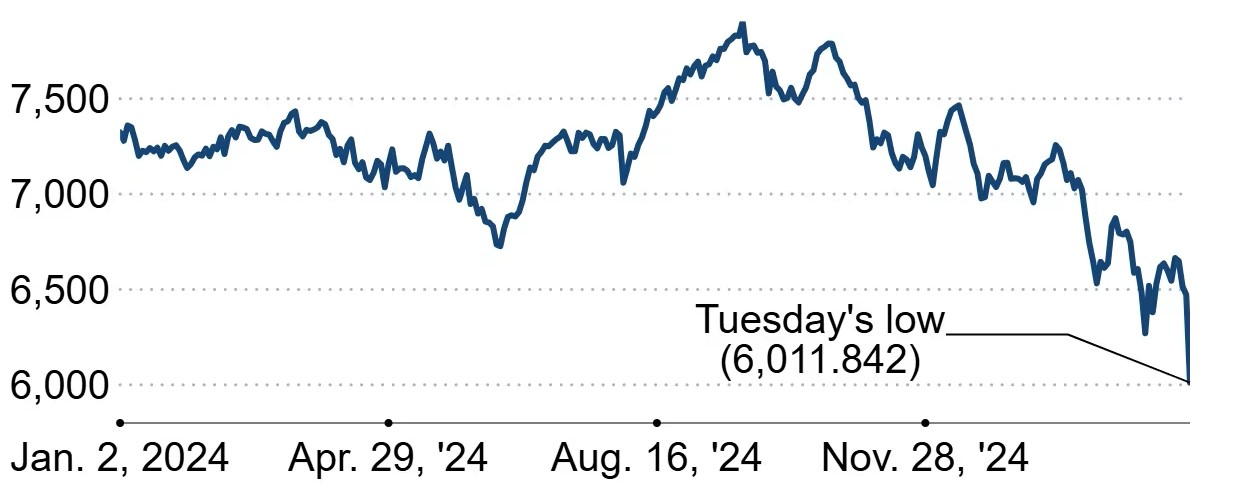
Indonesia Stock Exchange Composite Index during closing around 9:37 AM on 18 March 2025

In March 2025, Indonesia's financial markets faced a severe jolt as the Jakarta Composite Index (JCI) plunged by over 7% in a single trading session. This sharp intraday decline—recorded on 18 March—was the steepest since 2011. The plunge triggered an automatic 30-minute trading halt as markets faced a decline of 6.146% during closure at around 9:37 AM, a mechanism designed to stabilize markets at 5% during periods of excessive volatility. After a 30-minute halt, trading resumed but the index continued to decline, reaching a 7.1% drop at one point. The sharp decline in Indonesia's stock market quickly rippled across other sectors, with technology and manufacturing companies posting the biggest losses. Shares of DCI Indonesia, a leading provider of data center infrastructure, plunged around 20 percent, falling to 115,800 rupiah (approximately $7). Meanwhile, Chandra Asri Pacific, a major player in energy and chemicals, saw its stock price drop nearly 19 percent by the afternoon. During trading, foreign investors made a net sell of IDR 2.48 trillion, continuing the trend of outflows totalling IDR 29.41 trillion since the beginning of the year. Foreign ownership in the JCI also fell to 2.9%, the lowest since 2011, reflecting a decline in global interest in the Indonesian market. This contrasted with other Asian bourses that rallied. The negative market sentiment was fuelled by concerns over national economic conditions. The sudden downturn reflected a deepening crisis of investor confidence, rooted not only in macroeconomic uncertainties but also in political anxieties and shifting fiscal policies under President Prabowo Subianto's administration. In February alone, the state budget (APBN) recorded a deficit of IDR 31.2 trillion, while the consumer confidence index and savings ratio fell, indicating weak purchasing power. Layoffs increased, with major factories such as Yamaha and PT Sanken Indonesia closing. Tax revenue also weakened, with Income Tax 21 falling 39.5% YoY and IPR declining by 0.5% signalling consumption pressure. There was also a general decline in credit disbursement in Q3 2025 across many provinces, with the slowest growth being SME loans and consumer loans. This was attributed to lower consumer purchasing power and confidence as well as unstable political landscape. During this period, banks began shifting to corporate and commercial loans to avoid the increased risk in consumer and SME loans, where NPLs have experienced the highest increase. This trend occurred despite existing incentives from the Central Bank, such as lowered interest rates, reflecting the credit rationing phenomenon observed during the early days of the reformation era. Systemic risk looms over the capital market, given the potential impact on the financial sector.

Although macroeconomic factors and controversial fiscal policies of the Prabowo Subianto administration were the main culprits, public discourse and political debates also highlighted the revision of the TNI Law (RUU TNI) as a factor that worsened market sentiment. According to a Tempo report, economist from CELIOS, Nailul Huda, stated that the decline in the JCI has been occurring since 14 March, and the TNI bill is one of the triggers. He highlighted concerns that the military's expanded role in the civilian and economic spheres could lead to legal uncertainty, erode meritocracy, and cause investor fear. One example is the appointment of an active military officer as President Director of Perum Bulog, which fuelled perceptions of military intervention in the business sector. Deputy Chairman of Commission I of the House of Representatives Budi Djiwandono immediately reassured and denied that the TNI Bill was the direct cause of the JCI crash, asserting that there are no articles in the revised draft that explicitly regulate the placement of active TNI officers in state-owned enterprises. On the other hand, economists such as Wijayanto Samirin cited the revision of the TNI Law as one of the five factors that caused the market crash, citing public concerns over the potential return of ABRI's dual function. This view reflects the market's sensitivity to the issue of militarisation, even if only as a perception.

The response from Indonesian authorities was swift but indicative of broader systemic stress. The Financial Services Authority (OJK) introduced temporary measures allowing publicly listed firms to buy back shares without requiring prior shareholder approval—a move aimed at supporting valuations and signaling confidence. Concurrently, Bank Indonesia intervened in the foreign exchange market to stabilize the rupiah, deploying a combination of rate tools and reserves. These interventions did moderate the pace of capital outflows but did little to resolve the underlying concerns surrounding fiscal direction and political stability.

By August, the JCI had recovered and broken its previous all-time record.

After the 25–28 August protest turned violent, the Rupiah weakened 0.86% to the U.S. Dollar with a value of IDR 16,455 per U.S. Dollar the following Friday morning. The incident also caused another Indonesian stock market crash with the IDX Composite experiencing a 2% decline in the Friday morning market session, due to a high amount of panic selling among foreign investors.

== Investigation ==
On 17 June 2025, the Attorney General's Office of Indonesia (Kejagung) revealed during a press conference, a video of Marcella Santoso confessing that she had created numerous negative content surrounding Armed Forces Law, including #IndonesiaGelap protests and a petition calling for its repeal. A day later, she quickly denied her own confession after being interrogated by Kejagung. Marcella herself is an advocate who previously involved in acquittal during a crude palm oil (CPO) corruption scandal, money laundering, and obstruction of justice, the latter of which also involving fellow advocate Junaedi Saibih and the news director of Jak TV, Tian Bahtiar. Director of investigation at Kejagung, Abdul Qohar admitted that the investigators from Solicitor General for Special Crimes (Jampidsus) have not yet entered that issue.

Head of Information Centre at TNI, Major General Kristomei Sianturi found a number of proofs regarding the funds by Marcella flowing into buzzers, non-governmental organisations (NGOs), and other foundations, amounting up IDR 500 million and US$2 million, while also investigating its actors and their motives. Executive Director at Amnesty International Indonesia, Usman Hamid criticised that the video reveal has no relevance with the ongoing investigation process involving her, while also alleging "attempts to intimidate students' and civilian movements".

== See also ==
- May 1998 riots of Indonesia – period of civil unrest, anti-government protests, and racial violence in Indonesia which also resulted mass emigration
- 2019 Indonesian protests and riots – another nationwide, students-led protest during Joko Widodo's presidency
- Indonesia omnibus law protests – protests against the Job Creation Act
- 2022 Indonesian student protests – protests against rumours of the delay of the 2024 elections
- 2024 Indonesian local election law protests

=== International ===
- Protests against Bongbong Marcos in the Philippines
- Protests against Nicolás Maduro and Delcy Rodríguez in Venezuela
- Protests against Daniel Ortega in Nicaragua
