= List of government ministries of Indonesia =

This is a list of government ministries that compose the executive branch of the Government of Indonesia. There are currently 48 ministries, which consists of 7 (seven) coordinating ministries and 41 (forty one) ministries.

== Current ministries ==
The following is a list of government ministries that currently exist. If a ministry does not have their own seals or logos, it will use the national emblem of Indonesia, the "Garuda Pancasila".

=== Coordinating ministries ===
Seal / logo	Ministry name		Ministries	Formed	Minister		
Seal / logo	English	Indonesian (w/ abbreviation, when applicable)	Ministries	Formed	Portrait	Name and title	Party
	Coordinating Ministry for Political and Security Affairs	Kementerian Koordinator Bidang Politik dan Keamanan (Kemenko Polkam)	Ministry of Home Affairs; Ministry of Foreign Affairs; Ministry of Defense; Ministry of Communication and Digital Affairs; Attorney General's Office; National Armed Forces; National Police	21 October 2024		Dudung Abdurachman; Coordinating Minister for Political and Security Affairs	Independent
	Coordinating Ministry for Legal, Human Rights, Immigration, and Correction	Kementerian Koordinator Bidang Hukum, Hak Asasi Manusia, Imigrasi, dan Pemasyarakatan (Kemenko Kumham Imipas)	Ministry of Law; Ministry of Human Rights; Ministry of Immigration and Correction	21 October 2024		Yusril Ihza Mahendra; Coordinating Minister for Legal, Human Rights, Immigration, and Correction	PBB
	Coordinating Ministry for Economic Affairs	Kementerian Koordinator Bidang Perekonomian (Kemenko Perekonomian)	Ministry of Industry; Ministry of Trade; Ministry of Manpower; Ministry of Tourism	25 July 1966		Airlangga Hartarto; Coordinating Minister for Economic Affairs	Golkar
	Coordinating Ministry for Infrastructure and Regional Development	Kementerian Koordinator Bidang Infrastruktur dan Pembangunan Wilayah (Kemenko Infrabangwil)	Ministry of Agrarian Affairs and Spatial Planning; Ministry of Transportation; Ministry of Public Works; Ministry of Housing and Residential Area; Ministry of Transmigration	21 October 2024		Agus Harimurti Yudhoyono; Coordinating Minister for Infrastructure and Regional Development	Demokrat
	Coordinating Ministry for Food Affairs	Kementerian Koordinator Bidang Pangan (Kemenko Pangan)	Ministry of Agriculture; Ministry of Marine Affairs and Fisheries; Ministry of Environment; Ministry of Forestry; National Food Agency; National Nutrition Agency	21 October 2024		Zulkifli Hasan; Coordinating Minister for Food Affairs	PAN
	Coordinating Ministry for Human Development and Cultural Affairs	Kementerian Koordinator Bidang Pembangunan Manusia dan Kebudayaan (Kemenko PMK)	Ministry of Health; Ministry of Primary and Secondary Education; Ministry of Higher Education, Science, and Technology; Ministry of Cultural Affairs; Ministry of Religious Affairs; Ministry of Women Empowerment and Child Protection; Ministry of Population and Family Development; Ministry of Youth and Sports; Ministry of Hajj and Umrah	27 October 2014		Sugiono; Coordinating Minister for Human Development and Cultural Affairs	Gerindra
	Coordinating Ministry for Social Empowerment	Kementerian Koordinator Bidang Pemberdayaan Masyarakat (Kemenko Dayamas)	Ministry of Social Affairs; Ministry of Indonesian Migrant Workers Protection; Ministry of Cooperatives; Ministry of Micro, Small, and Medium Enterprises; Ministry of Villages and Development of Disadvantaged Regions; Ministry of Creative Economy	21 October 2024		Muhaimin Iskandar; Coordinating Minister for Social Empowerment	PKB
	Coordinating Ministry for Downstreaming and Energy Transition	Kementerian Koordinator Bidang Hilirisasi dan Transisi Energi	Ministry of Energy and Mineral Resources; Ministry of Investment and Downstreaming Policy	1 October 2026		Bahlil Lahadalia; Coordinating Minister for Downstreaming and Energy Transition	Golkar

=== Ministries ===
Seal	Ministry name		Formed	Minister		
Seal	English	Indonesian (w/ abbreviation, when applicable)	Formed	Portrait	Name and title	Party
	Ministry of State Secretariat	Kementerian Sekretariat Negara (Kemensetneg)	19 August 1945		Prasetyo Hadi; Minister of State Secretariat	Gerindra
	Ministry of Home Affairs	Kementerian Dalam Negeri (Kemendagri)	19 August 1945		Tito Karnavian; Minister of Home Affairs	Independent
	Ministry of Foreign Affairs	Kementerian Luar Negeri (Kemlu)	19 August 1945		Arrmanatha Nasir; Minister of Foreign Affairs	Independent
	Ministry of Defense	Kementerian Pertahanan (Kemhan)	18 September 1947		Sjafrie Sjamsoeddin; Minister of Defense	Independent
	Ministry of Law	Kementerian Hukum (Kemenkum)	19 August 2024		Supratman Andi Agtas; Minister of Law	Gerindra
	Ministry of Human Rights	Kementerian Hak Asasi Manusia (Kemenham)	21 October 2024		Natalius Pigai; Minister of Human Rights	Independent
	Ministry of Immigration and Correction	Kementerian Imigrasi dan Pemasyarakatan (Kemenimipas)	21 October 2024		Agus Andrianto; Minister of Immigration and Correction	Independent
	Ministry of Finance	Kementerian Keuangan (Kemenkeu)	19 August 1945		Suahasil Nazara; Minister of Finance	Independent
	Ministry of Energy and Mineral Resources	Kementerian Energi dan Sumber Daya Mineral (Kemen ESDM)	10 July 1959		Bahlil Lahadalia; Minister of Energy and Mineral Resources	Golkar
	Ministry of Industry	Kementerian Perindustrian (Kemenperin)	21 January 1950		Muhammad Sarmuji; Minister of Industry	Golkar
	Ministry of Trade	Kementerian Perdagangan (Kemendag)	19 August 1945		Budi Santoso; Minister of Trade	PAN
	Ministry of Agriculture	Kementerian Pertanian (Kementan)	19 August 1945		Amran Sulaiman; Minister of Agriculture	Independent
	Ministry of Environment / Environment Control Board	Kementerian Lingkungan Hidup / Badan Pengendalian Lingkungan Hidup (Kemen LH)	29 March 1978		Jumhur Hidayat; Minister of Environment / Head of Environment Control Board	Independent
	Ministry of Forestry	Kementerian Kehutanan (Kemenhut)	27 August 1964		Raja Juli Antoni; Minister of Forestry	PSI
	Ministry of Transportation	Kementerian Perhubungan (Kemenhub)	2 September 1945		Dudy Purwagandhi; Minister of Transportation	PAN
	Ministry of Marine Affairs and Fisheries	Kementerian Kelautan dan Perikanan (Kemenlutkan)	26 October 1999		Sakti Wahyu Trenggono; Minister of Marine Affairs and Fisheries	PAN
	Ministry of Manpower	Kementerian Ketenagakerjaan (Kemnaker)	3 July 1947		Yassierli; Minister of Manpower	Independent
	Ministry of Villages and Development of Disadvantaged Regions	Kementerian Desa dan Pembangunan Daerah Tertinggal (Kemendes PDT)	21 October 2024		Yandri Susanto; Minister of Villages and Development of Disadvantaged Regions	PAN
	Ministry of Transmigration	Kementerian Transmigrasi (Kementrans)	21 October 2024		Iftitah Sulaiman Suryanagara; Minister of Transmigration	Demokrat
	Ministry of Public Works	Kementerian Pekerjaan Umum (Kemen PU)	19 August 1945		Dody Hanggodo; Minister of Public Works	Demokrat
	Ministry of Housing and Residential Area	Kementerian Perumahan dan Kawasan Permukiman (Kemen PKP)	19 March 1983		Maruarar Sirait; Minister of Housing and Residential Area	Gerindra
	Ministry of Health	Kementerian Kesehatan (Kemenkes)	19 August 1945		Budi Gunadi Sadikin; Minister of Health	Independent
	Ministry of Primary and Secondary Education	Kementerian Pendidikan Dasar dan Menengah (Kemendikdasmen)	21 October 2024		Abdul Mu'ti; Minister of Primary and Secondary Education	Independent
	Ministry of Higher Education, Science, and Technology	Kementerian Pendidikan Tinggi, Sains, dan Teknologi (Kemendiktisaintek)	19 February 2025		Brian Yuliarto; Minister of Higher Education, Science, and Technology	Independent
	Ministry of Cultural Affairs	Kementerian Kebudayaan (Kemenkebud)	21 October 2024		Fadli Zon; Minister of Cultural Affairs	Gerindra
	Ministry of Social Affairs	Kementerian Sosial (Kemensos)	19 August 1945		Saifullah Yusuf; Minister of Social Affairs	PKB
	Ministry of Religious Affairs	Kementerian Agama (Kemenag)	19 August 1945		Nasaruddin Umar; Minister of Religious Affairs	Independent
	Ministry of Tourism	Kementerian Pariwisata (Kemenpar)	21 October 2024		Widiyanti Putri; Minister of Tourism	Independent
	Ministry of Creative Economy / Creative Economy Agency	Kementerian Ekonomi Kreatif / Badan Ekonomi Kreatif (Kemenekraf)	21 October 2024		Teuku Riefky Harsya; Minister of Creative Economy / Head of Creative Economy Agency	Demokrat
	Ministry of Communication and Digital Affairs	Kementerian Komunikasi dan Digital (Kemenkomdigi)	9 August 2001		Meutya Hafid; Minister of Communication and Digital Affairs	Golkar
	Ministry of Cooperatives	Kementerian Koperasi (Kemenkop)	21 October 2024		Ferry Juliantono; Minister of Cooperatives	Gerindra
	Ministry of Micro, Small, and Medium Enterprises	Kementerian Usaha Mikro, Kecil, dan Menengah (Kemen UMKM)	21 October 2024		Maman Abdurrahman; Minister of Micro, Small, and Medium Enterprises	Golkar
	Ministry of Women Empowerment and Child Protection	Kementerian Pemberdayaan Perempuan dan Perlindungan Anak (Kemen PPPA)	22 April 1978		Arifah Choiri Fauzi; Minister of Women Empowerment and Child Protection	Independent
	Ministry of State Apparatus Utilization and Bureaucratic Reform	Kementerian Pendayagunaan Aparatur Negara dan Reformasi Birokrasi (Kemen PAN-RB)	10 June 1968		Rini Widyantini; Minister of State Apparatus Utilization and Bureaucratic Reform	Independent
	Ministry of National Development Planning / National Development Planning Agency	Kementerian Perencanaan Pembangunan Nasional / Badan Perencanaan Pembangunan Nasional (Kemen PPN)	12 April 1947		Rachmat Pambudy; Minister of National Development Planning / Head of National Development Planning Agency	Gerindra
	Ministry of Agrarian Affairs and Spatial Planning / National Land Agency	Kementerian Agraria dan Tata Ruang / Badan Pertanahan Nasional (Kemen ATR)	24 September 1960		Nusron Wahid; Minister of Agrarian Affairs and Spatial Planning / Head of National Land Agency	Golkar
	Ministry of Youth and Sports	Kementerian Pemuda dan Olahraga (Kemenpora)	29 June 1946		Erick Thohir; Minister of Youth and Sports	Independent
	Ministry of Investment and Downstream Industry / Investment Coordinating Board	Kementerian Investasi dan Hilirisasi / Badan Koordinasi Penanaman Modal (Keminhil)	17 March 1993		Rosan Roeslani; Minister of Investment and Downstreaming Policy / Head of Investment Coordinating Board	Independent
	Ministry of Indonesian Migrant Workers Protection / Indonesian Migrant Workers Protection Agency	Kementerian Pelindungan Pekerja Migran / Badan Pelindungan Pekerja Migran (Kemen P2MI)	21 October 2024		Mukhtarudin; Minister of Indonesian Migrant Workers Protection / Head of Indonesian Migrant Workers Protection Agency	Golkar
	Ministry of Population and Family Development / National Population and Family Planning Board	Kementerian Kependudukan dan Pembangunan Keluarga / Badan Kependudukan dan Keluarga Berencana Nasional (Kemendukbangga)	19 March 1983		Wihaji; Minister of Population and Family Development / Head of National Population and Family Planning Board	Golkar
	Ministry of Hajj and Umrah	Kementerian Haji dan Umrah	8 September 2025		Mochamad Irfan Yusuf; Minister of Hajj and Umrah	Gerindra

== See also ==
- Cabinet of Indonesia
- Government of Indonesia
