= Red and White Cabinet =

Government cabinet of Indonesia (since 2024)

Red and White Cabinet Kabinet Merah Putih
- 42nd Cabinet of Indonesia
- 2024–present
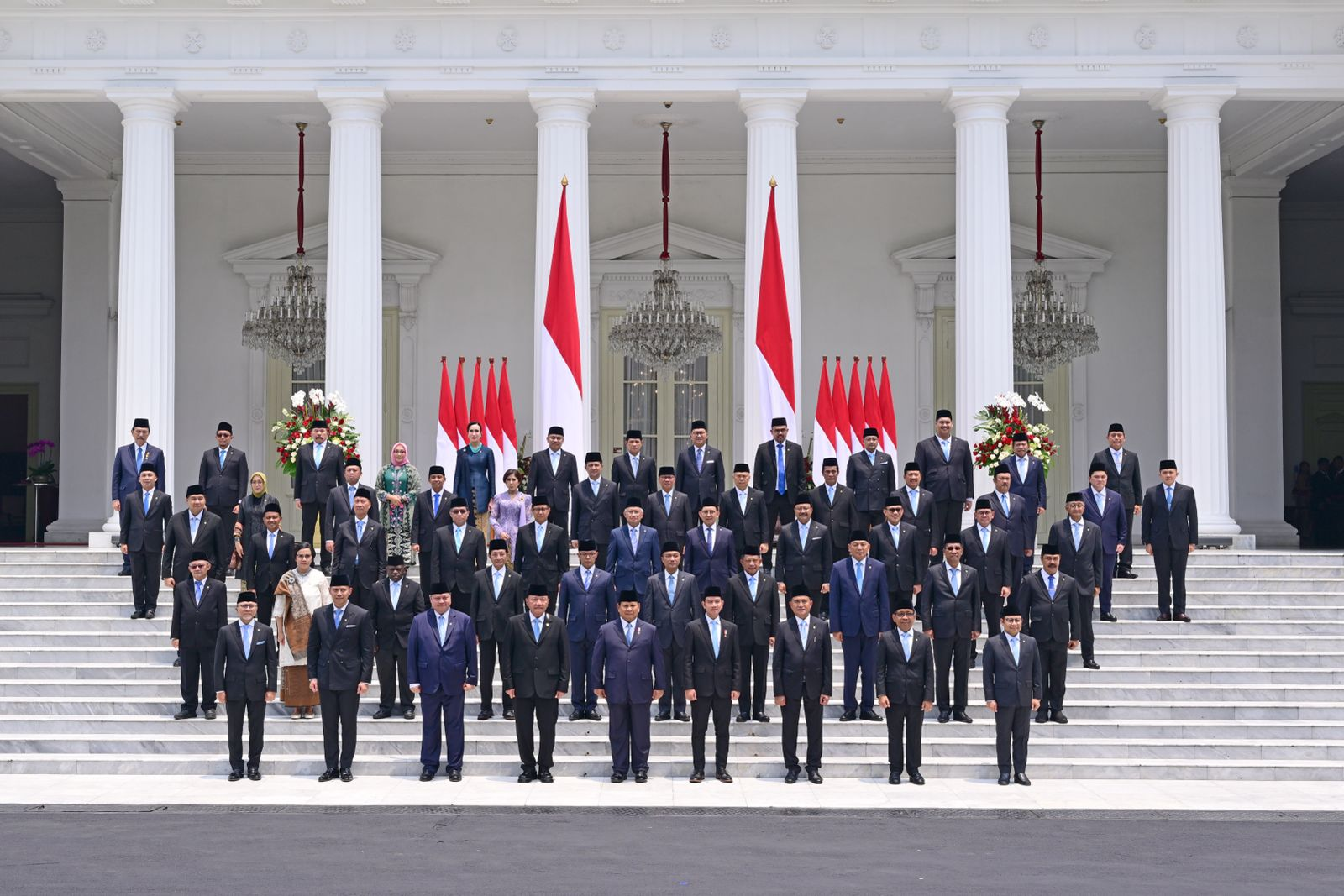
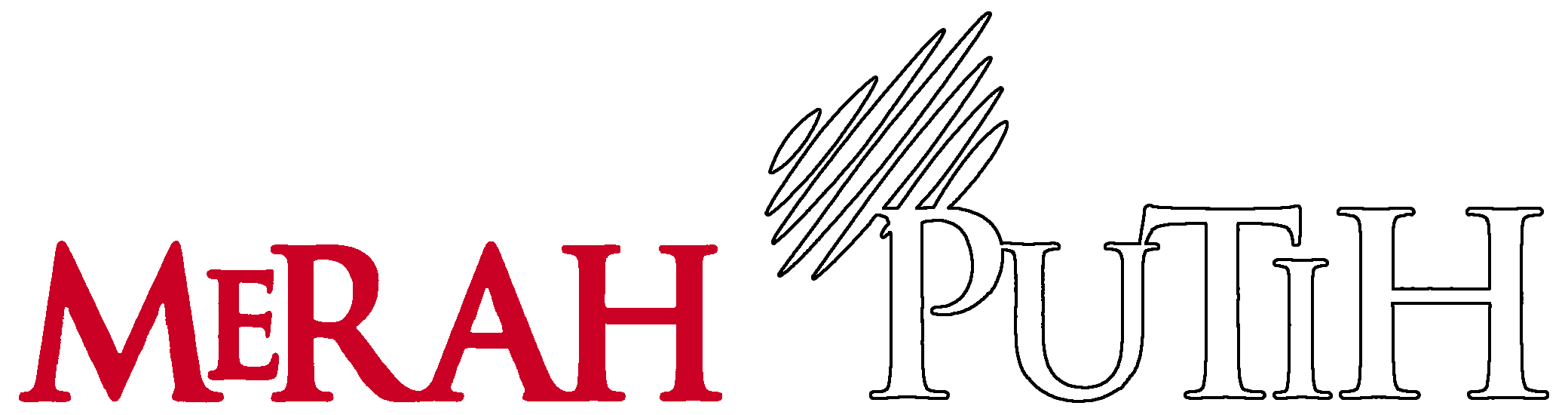
- Date formed: 21 October 2024

People and organisations
- Head of government: Prabowo Subianto
- No. of ministers: 48 ministers; 54 deputy ministers
- Member parties: Advanced Indonesia Coalition Plus: Gerindra; Demokrat; Golkar; PKB; PAN; PRIMA; PKP; Perindo; Gelora; PBB; Independent
- Status in legislature: Majority coalition 348 / 580

History
- Election: 2024 Indonesian presidential election
- Predecessor: Onward Indonesia Cabinet

The Red and White Cabinet (Indonesian: Kabinet Merah Putih, abbreviated as KMP) is the current Cabinet of Indonesia. It was sworn in on 21 October 2024 by President Prabowo Subianto.

As of 1 October 2026, with 49 ministers, 58 deputy ministers, and 11 cabinet-level agency officials (totaling 118 appointments), this cabinet is the second largest in Indonesia history (second to the Second Dwikora Cabinet with 132 appointments) and the largest cabinet formed in the post-Reformasi period.

== Nomenclature changes ==
Initially, the Red White cabinet consists of 7 coordinating ministries and 42 technical ministries. Many of those are new ministries split from previous ministries. It eventually expanded into 8 coordinating ministries and 49 ministries.

Coordinating Ministries
Ministry Name	Note
Coordinating Ministry for Political and Security Affairs	Split of the Coordinating Ministry for Political, Legal, and Security Affairs
Coordinating Ministry for Legal, Human Rights, Immigration, and Correction	Split of the Coordinating Ministry for Political, Legal, and Security Affairs
Coordinating Ministry for Human Development and Cultural Affairs	Split of the Coordinating Ministry for Human Development and Cultural Affairs
Coordinating Ministry for Social Empowerment	Split of the Coordinating Ministry for Human Development and Cultural Affairs
Coordinating Ministry for Infrastructure and Regional Development	Newly established
Coordinating Ministry for Food Affairs	Newly established
Coordinating Ministry for Downstreaming and Energy Transition	Newly established

Ministries
Ministry Name	Note
Ministry of Forestry	Split of the Ministry of Environment and Forestry
Ministry of Environment	Split of the Ministry of Environment and Forestry
Ministry of Public Works	Split of Ministry of Public Works and Housing
Ministry of Housing and Residential Area	Split of Ministry of Public Works and Housing
Ministry of Villages and Development of Disadvantaged Regions	Split of the Ministry of Villages, Development of Disadvantaged Regions, and Transmigration
Ministry of Transmigration	Split of the Ministry of Villages, Development of Disadvantaged Regions, and Transmigration
Ministry of Tourism	Split of the Ministry of Tourism and Creative Economy
Ministry of Creative Economy	Split of the Ministry of Tourism and Creative Economy
Ministry of Cooperatives	Split of the Ministry of Cooperatives and Small & Medium Enterprises
Ministry of Micro, Small, and Medium Enterprises	Split of the Ministry of Cooperatives and Small & Medium Enterprises
Ministry of Primary and Secondary Education	Split of the Ministry of Education, Culture, Research, and Technology
Ministry of Higher Education, Science, and Technology	Split of the Ministry of Education, Culture, Research, and Technology
Ministry of Cultural Affairs	Split of the Ministry of Education, Culture, Research, and Technology
Ministry of Law	Split of the Ministry of Law and Human Rights
Ministry of Human Rights	Split of the Ministry of Law and Human Rights
Ministry of Immigration and Correction	Split of the Ministry of Law and Human Rights
Ministry of Population and Family Development	Elevation of National Population and Family Planning Board
Ministry of Indonesian Migrant Workers Protection	Elevation of Indonesian Migrant Workers Protection Board
Ministry of Hajj and Umrah	Elevation of Hajj Management Authority
Agency Name	Note
Regulatory Agency of State-Owned Enterprise	Demotion from Ministry of State-Owned Enterprises

== Lineup ==
=== Heads of the cabinet ===
President	Vice President
Prabowo Subianto	Gibran Rakabuming Raka (2024–2026)
Prabowo Subianto	Vacant

=== Coordinating ministers ===
Portfolio	Minister	Took office	Left office	Party
Coordinating Minister for Political and Security Affairs	Budi Gunawan	21 October 2024	8 September 2025	Independent
Coordinating Minister for Political and Security Affairs	Sjafrie Sjamsoeddin (interim)	8 September 2025	17 September 2025	Independent
Coordinating Minister for Political and Security Affairs	Djamari Chaniago	17 September 2025	1 October 2026	Gerindra
Coordinating Minister for Political and Security Affairs	Dudung Abdurachman	1 October 2026	Incumbent	Independent
Coordinating Minister for Legal, Human Rights, Immigration, and Correction	Yusril Ihza Mahendra	21 October 2024	Incumbent	PBB
Coordinating Minister for Economic Affairs	Airlangga Hartarto	21 October 2024	Incumbent	Golkar
Coordinating Minister for Infrastructure and Regional Development	Agus Harimurti Yudhoyono	21 October 2024	Incumbent	Demokrat
Coordinating Minister for Human Development and Cultural Affairs	Pratikno	21 October 2024	1 October 2026	Independent
Coordinating Minister for Human Development and Cultural Affairs	Sugiono	1 October 2026	Incumbent	Gerindra
Coordinating Minister for Social Empowerment	Muhaimin Iskandar	21 October 2024	Incumbent	PKB
Coordinating Minister for Food Affairs	Zulkifli Hasan	21 October 2024	Incumbent	PAN
Coordinating Ministry for Downstreaming and Energy Transition	Bahlil Lahadalia	1 October 2026	Incumbent	Golkar

=== Ministers ===
Portfolio	Minister	Took office	Left office	Party
Minister of State Secretariat	Prasetyo Hadi	21 October 2024	Incumbent	Gerindra
Minister of Home Affairs	Tito Karnavian	21 October 2024	Incumbent	Independent
Minister of Foreign Affairs	Sugiono	21 October 2024	1 October 2026	Gerindra
Minister of Foreign Affairs	Arrmanatha Nasir	1 October 2026	Incumbent	Independent
Minister of Defense	Sjafrie Sjamsoeddin	21 October 2024	Incumbent	Independent
Minister of Law	Supratman Andi Agtas	21 October 2024	Incumbent	Gerindra
Minister of Human Rights	Natalius Pigai	21 October 2024	Incumbent	Independent
Minister of Immigration and Correction	Agus Andrianto	21 October 2024	Incumbent	Independent
Minister of Finance	Sri Mulyani	21 October 2024	8 September 2025	Independent
Minister of Finance	Purbaya Yudhi Sadewa	8 September 2025	14 September 2026	Independent
Minister of Finance	Suahasil Nazara	14 September 2026	Incumbent	Independent
Minister of Energy and Mineral Resources	Bahlil Lahadalia	21 October 2024	Incumbent	Golkar
Minister of Industry	Agus Gumiwang Kartasasmita	21 October 2024	1 October 2026	Golkar
Minister of Industry	Muhammad Sarmuji	1 October 2026	Incumbent	Golkar
Minister of Trade	Budi Santoso	21 October 2024	Incumbent	PAN
Minister of Agriculture	Amran Sulaiman	21 October 2024	Incumbent	Independent
Minister of Environment (Head of Environment Control Board)	Hanif Faisol Nurofiq	21 October 2024	27 April 2026	PAN
Minister of Environment (Head of Environment Control Board)	Jumhur Hidayat	27 April 2026	Incumbent	Independent
Minister of Forestry	Raja Juli Antoni	21 October 2024	Incumbent	Independent
Minister of Transportation	Dudy Purwagandhi	21 October 2024	Incumbent	PAN
Minister of Marine Affairs and Fisheries	Sakti Wahyu Trenggono	21 October 2024	Incumbent	PAN
Minister of Manpower	Yassierli	21 October 2024	Incumbent	Independent
Minister of Public Works	Dody Hanggodo	21 October 2024	Incumbent	Demokrat
Minister of Housing and Residential Area	Maruarar Sirait	21 October 2024	Incumbent	Gerindra
Minister of Health	Budi Gunadi Sadikin	21 October 2024	Incumbent	Independent
Minister of Primary and Secondary Education	Abdul Mu'ti	21 October 2024	Incumbent	Independent
Minister of Higher Education, Science, and Technology	Satryo Soemantri Brodjonegoro	21 October 2024	19 February 2025	Independent
Minister of Higher Education, Science, and Technology	Brian Yuliarto	19 February 2025	Incumbent	Independent
Minister of Agrarian Affairs and Spatial Planning (Head of National Land Agency)	Nusron Wahid	21 October 2024	Incumbent	Golkar
Minister of Social Affairs	Saifullah Yusuf	21 October 2024	Incumbent	PKB
Minister of Religious Affairs	Nasaruddin Umar	21 October 2024	Incumbent	Independent
Minister of Communication and Digital Affairs	Meutya Hafid	21 October 2024	Incumbent	Golkar
Minister of Cooperatives	Budi Arie Setiadi	21 October 2024	8 September 2025	Independent
Minister of Cooperatives	Ferry Juliantono	8 September 2025	Incumbent	Gerindra
Minister of Micro, Small, and Medium Enterprises	Maman Abdurrahman	21 October 2024	Incumbent	Golkar
Minister of Women Empowerment and Child Protection	Arifah Choiri Fauzi	21 October 2024	Incumbent	Independent
Minister of State Apparatus Utilization and Bureaucratic Reform	Rini Widyantini	21 October 2024	Incumbent	Independent
Minister of Villages and Development of Disadvantaged Regions	Yandri Susanto	21 October 2024	Incumbent	PAN
Minister of Transmigration	Iftitah Sulaiman Suryanagara	21 October 2024	Incumbent	Demokrat
Minister of National Development Planning (Head of National Development Planning Agency)	Rachmat Pambudy	21 October 2024	Incumbent	Gerindra
Minister of State-Owned Enterprises	Erick Thohir	21 October 2024	17 September 2025	Independent
Minister of State-Owned Enterprises	Dony Oskaria (acting)	19 September 2025	2 October 2025	Independent
Minister of Cultural Affairs	Fadli Zon	21 October 2024	Incumbent	Gerindra
Minister of Tourism	Widiyanti Putri	21 October 2024	Incumbent	Independent
Minister of Creative Economy (Head of Creative Economy Agency)	Teuku Riefky Harsya	21 October 2024	Incumbent	Demokrat
Minister of Youth and Sports	Dito Ariotedjo	21 October 2024	8 September 2025	Golkar
Minister of Youth and Sports	Erick Thohir	17 September 2025	Incumbent	Independent
Minister of Investment and Downstream Industry (Head of Investment Coordinating Board)	Rosan Roeslani	21 October 2024	Incumbent	Independent
Minister of Indonesian Migrant Workers Protection (Head of Indonesian Migrant Workers Protection Board)	Abdul Kadir Karding	21 October 2024	8 September 2025	PKB
Minister of Indonesian Migrant Workers Protection (Head of Indonesian Migrant Workers Protection Board)	Mukhtarudin	8 September 2025	Incumbent	Golkar
Minister of Population and Family Development (Head of National Population and Family Planning Board)	Wihaji	21 October 2024	Incumbent	Golkar
Minister of Hajj and Umrah	Mochamad Irfan Yusuf	8 September 2025	Incumbent	Gerindra

=== Deputy ministers ===
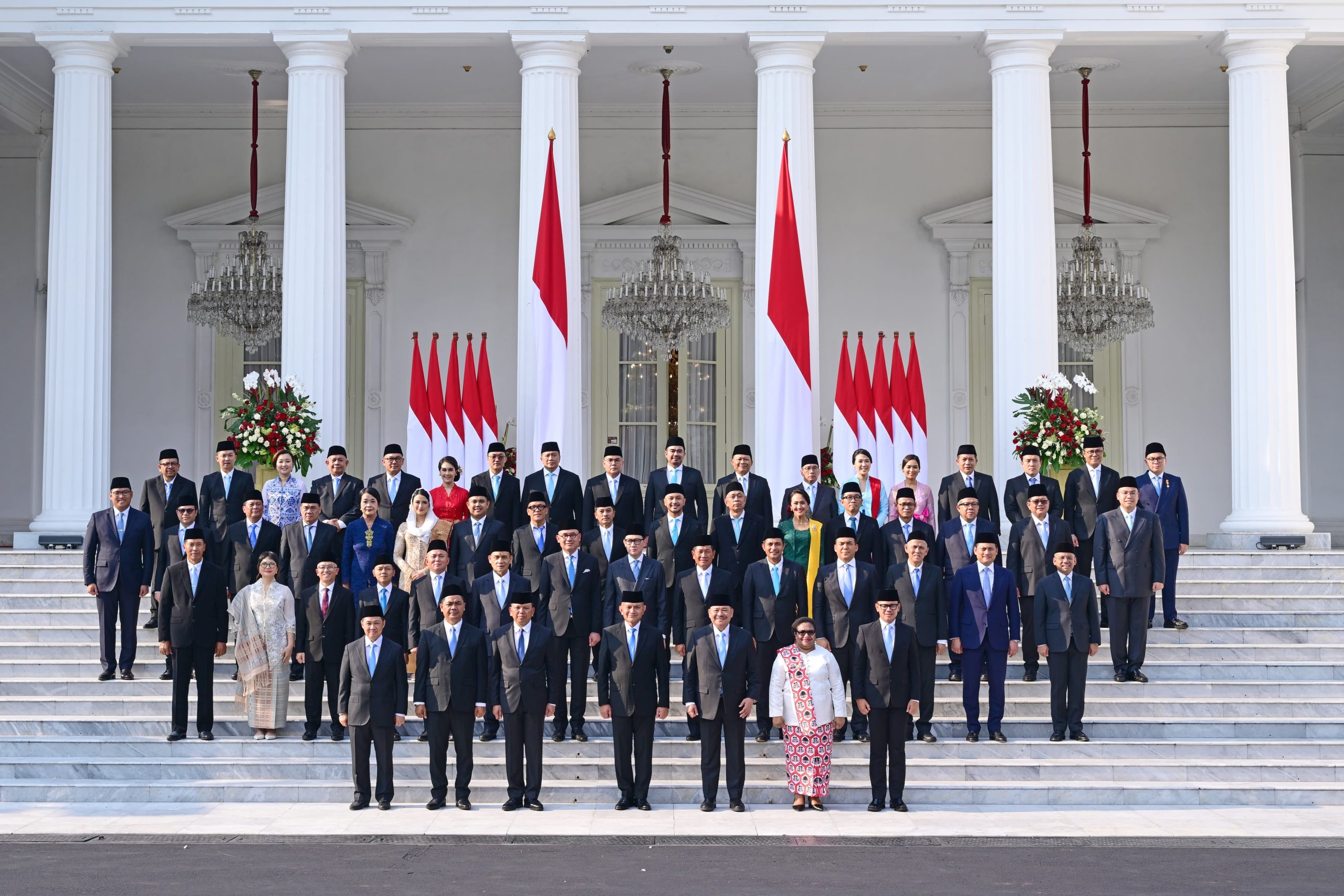
Photo of the deputy ministers of the Red and White Cabinet

Portfolio	Minister	Took office	Left office	Party
Deputy Coordinating Minister for Political and Security Affairs	Lodewijk Freidrich Paulus	21 October 2024	Incumbent	Golkar
Deputy Coordinating Minister for Legal, Human Rights, Immigration, and Correction	Otto Hasibuan	21 October 2024	Incumbent	Independent
Deputy Coordinating Minister for Economic Affairs	Drajad Wibowo	1 October 2026	Incumbent	PAN
Deputy Coordinating Minister for Food Affairs	Hanif Faisol Nurofiq	27 April 2026	Incumbent	PAN
Deputy Minister of State Secretariat	Bambang Eko Suhariyanto	21 October 2024	Incumbent	Independent
Deputy Minister of State Secretariat	Juri Ardiantoro	21 October 2024	Incumbent	Independent
Deputy Minister of Home Affairs	Bima Arya Sugiarto	21 October 2024	Incumbent	PAN
Deputy Minister of Home Affairs	Ribka Haluk	21 October 2024	Incumbent	Independent
Deputy Minister of Home Affairs	Akhmad Wiyagus	8 October 2024	Incumbent	Independent
Deputy Minister of Foreign Affairs	Anis Matta	21 October 2024	Incumbent	Gelora
Deputy Minister of Foreign Affairs	Arrmanatha Christiawan Nasir	21 October 2024	1 October 2026	Independent
Deputy Minister of Foreign Affairs	Arif Havas Oegroseno	21 October 2024	Incumbent	Independent
Deputy Minister of Defense	Donny Ermawan Taufanto	21 October 2024	15 October 2026	Independent
Deputy Minister of Defense	Richard Taruli Horja Tampubolon	15 October 2026	Incumbent	Independent
Deputy Minister of Defense	Yusuf Jauhari	15 October 2026	Incumbent	Independent
Deputy Minister of Law	Eddy Hiariej	21 October 2024	Incumbent	Independent
Deputy Minister of Human Rights	Mugiyanto	21 October 2024	Incumbent	Independent
Deputy Minister of Immigration and Correction	Silmy Karim	21 October 2024	4 June 2026	Independent
Deputy Minister of Immigration and Correction	Maulana Bungaran	15 October 2026	Incumbent	Gerindra
Deputy Minister of Religious Affairs	Muhammad Syafi'i	21 October 2024	Incumbent	Gerindra
Deputy Minister of Finance	Thomas Djiwandono	21 October 2024	5 February 2026	Gerindra
Deputy Minister of Finance	Suahasil Nazara	21 October 2024	14 September 2026	Independent
Deputy Minister of Finance	Anggito Abimanyu	21 October 2024	8 October 2025	Independent
Deputy Minister of Finance	Juda Agung	5 February 2026	Incumbent	Independent
Deputy Minister of Finance	Luky Alfirman	1 October 2026	Incumbent	Independent
Deputy Minister of Finance	Nurkholisoh Ibnu Aman	1 October 2026	Incumbent	Independent
Deputy Minister of Primary and Secondary Education	Fajar Riza Ul Haq	21 October 2024	Incumbent	Independent
Deputy Minister of Primary and Secondary Education	Atip Latipulhayat	21 October 2024	Incumbent	Independent
Deputy Minister of Higher Education, Science, and Technology	Fauzan	21 October 2024	Incumbent	Independent
Deputy Minister of Higher Education, Science, and Technology	Stella Christie	21 October 2024	Incumbent	Independent
Deputy Minister of Health	Dante Saksono Harbuwono	21 October 2024	Incumbent	Independent
Deputy Minister of Health	Benjamin Paulus Octavianus	8 October 2025	Incumbent	Gerindra
Deputy Minister of Social Affairs	Agus Jabo Priyono	21 October 2024	Incumbent	PRIMA
Deputy Minister of Cultural Affairs	Giring Ganesha	21 October 2024	Incumbent	Independent
Deputy Minister of Manpower	Immanuel Ebenezer	21 October 2024	22 August 2025	Gerindra
Deputy Minister of Manpower	Afriansyah Noor	17 September 2025	Incumbent	Demokrat
Deputy Minister of Indonesian Migrant Workers Protection (Deputy Head of Indonesian Migrant Workers Protection Board)	Christina Aryani	21 October 2024	Incumbent	Golkar
Deputy Minister of Indonesian Migrant Workers Protection (Deputy Head of Indonesian Migrant Workers Protection Board)	Dzulfikar Ahmad Tawalla	21 October 2024	Incumbent	Independent
Deputy Minister of Industry	Faisol Riza	21 October 2024	Incumbent	PKB
Deputy Minister of Trade	Dyah Roro Esti	21 October 2024	Incumbent	Golkar
Deputy Minister of Energy and Mineral Resources	Yuliot Tanjung	21 October 2024	Incumbent	Independent
Deputy Minister of Public Works	Diana Kusumastuti	21 October 2024	Incumbent	Independent
Deputy Minister of Housing and Residential Area	Fahri Hamzah	21 October 2024	Incumbent	Gelora
Deputy Minister of Villages and Development of Disadvantaged Regions	Ahmad Riza Patria	21 October 2024	Incumbent	Gerindra
Deputy Minister of Transmigration	Viva Yoga Mauladi	21 October 2024	Incumbent	PAN
Deputy Minister of Transportation	Suntana	21 October 2024	Incumbent	Independent
Deputy Minister of Communication and Digital Affairs	Angga Raka Prabowo	21 October 2024	Incumbent	Gerindra
Deputy Minister of Communication and Digital Affairs	Nezar Patria	21 October 2024	Incumbent	Independent
Deputy Minister of Agriculture	Sudaryono	21 October 2024	Incumbent	Gerindra
Deputy Minister of Agriculture	Muhammad Saleh Mustafa	1 October 2026	Incumbent	Independent
Deputy Minister of Agriculture	Alim Setiawan	15 October 2026	Incumbent	Independent
Deputy Minister of Environment (Deputy Head of Environment Control Board)	Diaz Hendropriyono	21 October 2024	Incumbent	PKP
Deputy Minister of Forestry	Sulaiman Umar Siddiq	21 October 2024	17 September 2025	Independent
Deputy Minister of Forestry	Rohmat Marzuki	17 September 2025	Incumbent	Gerindra
Deputy Minister of Marine Affairs and Fisheries	Didit Herdiawan	21 October 2024	Incumbent	Independent
Deputy Minister of Marine Affairs and Fisheries	Irwan Meilano	1 October 2026	Incumbent	Independent
Deputy Minister of Agrarian Affairs and Spatial Planning (Deputy Head of National Land Agency)	Ossy Dermawan	21 October 2024	Incumbent	Demokrat
Deputy Minister of National Development Planning (Deputy Head of National Development Planning Agency)	Febrian Alphyanto Ruddyard	21 October 2024	Incumbent	Independent
Deputy Minister of State Apparatus Utilization and Bureaucratic Reform	Purwadi Arianto	21 October 2024	Incumbent	Independent
Deputy Minister of State-Owned Enterprises	Kartika Wirjoatmodjo	21 October 2024	2 October 2025	Independent
Deputy Minister of State-Owned Enterprises	Aminuddin Ma'ruf	21 October 2024	2 October 2025	Independent
Deputy Minister of State-Owned Enterprises	Dony Oskaria	21 October 2024	2 October 2025	Independent
Deputy Minister of Population and Family Development (Deputy Head of National Population and Family Planning Board)	Isyana Bagoes Oka	21 October 2024	Incumbent	Independent
Deputy Minister of Investment and Downstream Industry (Deputy Head of Investment Coordinating Board)	Todotua Pasaribu	21 October 2024	Incumbent	Independent
Deputy Minister of Cooperatives	Ferry Juliantono	21 October 2024	8 September 2025	Gerindra
Deputy Minister of Cooperatives	Farida Farichah	17 September 2025	Incumbent	PKB
Deputy Minister of Micro, Small, and Medium Enterprises	Helvi Yuni Moraza	21 October 2024	Incumbent	Gerindra
Deputy Minister of Tourism	Ni Luh Puspa	21 October 2024	Incumbent	Independent
Deputy Minister of Creative Economy (Deputy Head of Creative Economy Agency)	Irene Umar	21 October 2024	Incumbent	Independent
Deputy Minister of Women Empowerment and Child Protection	Veronica Tan	21 October 2024	Incumbent	Perindo
Deputy Minister of Youth and Sports	Taufik Hidayat	21 October 2024	Incumbent	Gerindra
Deputy Minister of Hajj and Umrah	Dahnil Anzar Simanjuntak	8 September 2025	Incumbent	Gerindra

=== Cabinet-level officials ===
Portfolio	Minister	Took office	Left office	Party
Commander of the National Armed Forces	General Agus Subiyanto	22 November 2023	Incumbent	Independent
Chief of the National Police	Police General Listyo Sigit Prabowo	27 January 2021	1 October 2026	Independent
Chief of the National Police	Police General Suyudi Ario Seto	1 October 2026	Incumbent	Independent
Attorney General	Sanitiar Burhanuddin	21 October 2024	Incumbent	Independent
Head of State Intelligence Agency	Muhammad Herindra	21 October 2024	Incumbent	Independent
Chief of Presidential Staff	Anto Mukti Putranto	21 October 2024	17 September 2025	Independent
Chief of Presidential Staff	Muhammad Qodari	17 September 2025	27 April 2026	Independent
Chief of Presidential Staff	Dudung Abdurachman	27 April 2026	1 October 2026	Independent
Chief of Presidential Staff	Listyo Sigit Prabowo	1 October 2026	4 November 2026	Independent
Chief of Presidential Staff	Ariyo Windutomo (acting)	4 November 2026	Incumbent	Independent
Head of Presidential Communication Office Head of Government Communications Agency	Hasan Nasbi	21 October 2024	29 April 2025	Independent
Head of Presidential Communication Office Head of Government Communications Agency	Angga Raka Prabowo (Note: Also served as Deputy Minister of Communication and Digital Affairs)	17 September 2025	27 April 2026	Gerindra
Head of Presidential Communication Office Head of Government Communications Agency	Muhammad Qodari	27 April 2026	Incumbent	Independent
Head of Presidential Communication Office Head of Government Communications Agency	Syahganda Nainggolan	2 October 2026	Incumbent	Independent
Chairman of National Economics Council	Luhut Binsar Pandjaitan	21 October 2024	Incumbent	Golkar
Chief of National Cyber and Crypto Agency	Nugroho Sulistyo Budi	19 February 2025	Incumbent	Independent
Chief of Finance and Development Supervisory Agency	Muhammad Yusuf Ateh	19 February 2025	Incumbent	Independent
Chief of Central Agency of Statistics	Amalia Adininggar Widyasanti	19 February 2025	Incumbent	Independent
Chief of Quarantine Agency	Abdul Kadir Karding	27 April 2026	Incumbent	PKB

=== Other officials related to the cabinet ===
Portfolio	Minister	Took office	Left office	Party
Cabinet Secretary	Teddy Indra Wijaya	21 October 2024	Incumbent	Independent
Head of National Nutrition Agency	Dadan Hindayana	22 October 2024	2 June 2026	Independent
Head of National Nutrition Agency	Nanik Sudaryati Deyang	8 June 2026	22 July 2026	Independent
Head of National Nutrition Agency	Sudaryono	22 July 2026	Incumbent	Gerindra

== Reshuffles ==
=== First reshuffle ===
The Minister of Higher Education, Science, and Technology Satryo Brodjonegoro resigned on 19 February 2025, citing underperformance, although he was also mired with controversies during his tenure as minister. He was replaced by Brian Yuliarto.

=== Second reshuffle ===
On 8 September 2025, the president replaced five ministers, although only three ministers were immediately sworn, which were the Ministry of Finance, Ministry of Indonesian Migrant Workers Protection, and Ministry of Cooperatives. The definitive replacement for Coordinating Minister for Political and Security Affairs is yet to be announced, and the position would be filled by an ad interim official, while the to-be-announced new Minister of Youth and Sports could not attend the ceremony and would be sworn at later date.

The Hajj Management Authority was transformed into the newly created Ministry of Hajj and Umrah, with Mochamad Irfan Yusuf and Dahnil Anzar Simanjuntak as its minister and deputy minister, respectively.

Incumbent Minister of Defense Sjafrie Sjamsoeddin was appointed as the ad interim Coordinating Minister for Political and Security Affairs on 8 September and the news was announced the day after.

=== Third reshuffle ===
On 17 September, the president appointed the replacements for the Coordinating Minister for Political and Security Affairs and the Minister of Youth and Sports, replaced the Chief of Presidential Staff, the Head of Presidential Communication Office, the Deputy Heads of National Nutrition Agency, and three deputy ministers. The president also appointed the Police Commissioner General (Ret.) Ahmad Dofiri as the Special Advisor of the President for Security and Public Order and Police Reform.

Notably, Erick Thohir, which was the Minister of State-Owned Enterprises, was dismissed from that position and appointed as the new Minister of Youth and Sports. Dony Oskaria was appointed as acting Minister of State-Owned Enterprises on 19 September.

=== Fourth reshuffle ===
On 27 April 2026, the president appointed the replacements for the Ministry of Environment, Deputy Coordinating Minister for Food Affairs, Chief of Presidential Staff, and Head of Government Communications Agency.

=== Fifth reshuffle ===
The president appointed Suahasil Nazara as the new Minister of Finance on 14 September. He was previously one of the deputy ministers of finance.

=== Sixth reshuffle ===
On 1 October, the president appointed the replacements for the Coordinating Minister for Political and Security Affairs, Coordinating Minister for Human Development and Cultural Affairs, Minister of Foreign Affairs, Minister of Industry, and several deputy ministers. The president also appointed the new Chief of the National Police and its Deputy, and Chief of Presidential Staff. New position of the Coordinating Minister for Downstreaming and Energy was created, headed concurrently by the incumbent Minister of Energy and Mineral Resources Bahlil Lahadalia.

=== Replacements outside of reshuffle ===
The House of Representatives (DPR) ratified the fourth revision of the Law on State-Owned Enterprise on 2 October 2025. The Ministry of State-Owned Enterprises is dissolved and replaced with the ministerial-level State-Owned Enterprise Management Agency. Its leader is to be appointed by the President. Consequently, the positions of Minister and Deputy Minister of State-Owned Enterprises were automatically abolished.

On 8 October 2025, President Prabowo inaugurated two additional deputy ministers, Akhmad Wiyagud as Deputy Minister of Home Affairs and Benjamin Paulus Octavianus as Deputy Minister of Health. The president also appointed the Head and Deputy Heads of the new State-Owned Enterprise Management Agency.

On 5 February 2026, Juda Agung was appointed as Deputy Minister of Finance, replacing Thomas Djiwandono who was elected as Deputy Governor of Bank Indonesia.

On 15 October 2026, President Prabowo appointed Richard Tampubolon and Yusuf Jauhari as Deputies Minister of Defense, Maulana Bungaran as Deputy Minister of Immigration and Correction, and Alim Setiawan as Deputy Minister of Agriculture.

Listyo Sigit Prabowo was dimissed as Chief of Presidential Staff on 4 November 2026 as he was named as one of the suspects for alleged illegal wiretapping of the president and other public figures. Lieutenant General Ariyo Windutomo was appointed as Acting Chief of Presidential Staff.

== See also ==
- Politics of Indonesia
