= Coordinating Ministry for Food Affairs =

- Kementerian Koordinator Bidang Pangan

Ministry overview
- Formed: 20 October 2024 (announcement); 5 November 2024
- Preceding agencies: Deputy I (Coordination for Maritime and Energy Sovereignty), Coordinating Ministry for Maritime and Investment Affairs (partial); Deputy II (Coordination for Maritime Resources), Coordinating Ministry for Maritime and Investment Affairs; Deputy IV (Coordination for Environmental Management and Forestry), Coordinating Ministry for Maritime and Investment Affairs; Deputy II (Coordination for Foods and Agribusinesses), Coordinating Ministry for Economic Affairs
- Jurisdiction: Government of Indonesia
- Headquarters: Graha Mandiri Jl. Imam Bonjol No. 61, Central Jakarta Jakarta, Indonesia
- Minister responsible: Zulkifli Hasan, Coordinating Minister
- Website: www.kemenkopangan.go.id

Logo of Coordinating Ministry for Food Affairs (2024–2025)

The Coordinating Ministry for Food Affairs (Note: Indonesian: Kementerian Koordinator Bidang Pangan.) is an Indonesian government ministry in charge of planning and policy coordination, as well as synchronization of policies in the field of food affairs. The ministry is led by a Coordinating Minister, which is currently held by Zulkifli Hasan since 21 October 2024. This coordinating ministry is one of the indirect successors of the Coordinating Ministry for Maritime and Investment Affairs.

== History ==
Coordinating Ministry of Food Affairs is not a new creation. Previously, it was founded on 3 July 1947 by during First Amir Sjarifuddin Cabinet as State Ministry for Food Affairs with Suja'as of Peasants Front of Indonesia as the first minister. The state ministryship was lasted until Second Amir Sjarifuddin Cabinet and disbanded on 29 January 1948.

Eventually, the office of food affairs revived on 22 April 1978 under the name of Undersecretary of Food Production Affairs under the Ministry of Agriculture with Cosmas Batubara as undersecretary until 16 March 1983 during Third Development Cabinet. The undersecretary later renamed as Undersecretary of Food Production Enhancement with Wardojo as undersecretary until 21 March 1988 during Fourth Development Cabinet. It was disbanded during Fifth Development Cabinet.

Then, the office revived in Sixth Development Cabinet and even survived to early Reformasi period under various names:

- State Ministry of Food Affairs/Indonesia Logistics Bureau, headed by State Minister of Food Affairs and Chairman of Indonesia Logistics Bureau Ibrahim Hasan (17 March 1993 - 11 March 1998). The Indonesia Logistics Bureau was spun off from the ministry on 16 February 1995 forming the present-day Bulog.
- State Ministry of Food Affairs, Horticulture, and Drugs headed by State Minister of Food Affairs, Horticulture, and Drugs Haryanto Dhanutirto (16 March 1998 - 20 May 1998). He was one of the 13 ministers that resigned from Seventh Development Cabinet, which leading to Fall of Suharto.
- State Ministry of Food Affairs and Horticulture headed by State Minister of Food Affairs and Horticulture Ahmad Muflih Saefuddin (23 May 1998 - 27 September 1999) and Soleh Solahudin (27 September 1999 - 20 October 1999).

The office was disbanded 20 October 1999 as Habibie stepped down from his presidency and the coordination of food affairs was returned to the domain of the Ministry of Agriculture, until eventually assumed by Coordinating Ministry for Economic Affairs by formation of Coordinating Deputy for Agriculture and Marine Affairs by Susilo Bambang Yudhoyono on 31 January 2005 thru Presidential Decree No. 10/2005. It was numbered as Deputy II of Coordinating Ministry for Economic Affairs.

Being Deputy II of Coordinating Ministry for Economic Affairs, it was known with various names:

- Deputy II (Agriculture and Marine Affairs) (2005-2011)
- Deputy II (Foods and Environmental Affairs) (2011-2015)
- Deputy II (Foods and Agriculture) (2015-2020)
- Deputy II (Foods and Agribusinesses) (2020-2024)

In Prabowo Subianto administration, Deputy II of Coordinating Ministry for Economic Affairs pulled out from the Coordinating Ministry for Economic Affairs and amalgamated by remnants of Coordinating Ministry for Maritime and Investment Affairs (formerly Deputy I, II, and IV of the Coordinating Ministry for Economic Affairs) forming the present-day Coordinating Ministry for Food Affairs.

== Organization ==
Based on the Presidential Decree No. 147/2024 and as expanded by the Coordinating Ministrer for Food Affairs Decree No. 1/2024, the Coordinating Ministry for Food is organized into the following:

- Office of the Coordinating Minister for Food Affairs
- Coordinating Ministry Secretariat
  - Bureau of Management, Performance, Data, and Information
  - Bureau of Human Resources and Organization
  - Bureau of Legal Affairs and Partnership
  - Bureau of General Affairs, Finance, and Communication
    - Division of Household Affairs, Finance, and Procurement
    - Division of Protocols, Leadership Administration, Proceedings, and Communication
      - Coordinating Ministry Administration Subdivision
      - Coordinating Ministry Secretariat and Board of Experts Administration Subdivision
- Inspectorate
- Deputy for Food Trade Administration and Distribution Coordination (Deputy I)
  - Deputy I Secretariat
  - Assistant Deputy for Foreign Food Trade Administration
  - Assistant Deputy for Domestic Food Trade Administration
  - Assistant Deputy for Food Price Stabilization
  - Assistant Deputy for Domestic Food Logistics
  - Assistant Deputy for National Food Systems
- Deputy for Food and Agriculture Businesses Coordination (Deputy II)
  - Deputy II Secretariat
  - Assistant Deputy for Competitive Improvement of Food Crops Products
  - Assistant Deputy for Competitive Improvement of Agricultural Products
  - Assistant Deputy for Agriculture Facilities and Infrastructures Management
  - Assistant Deputy for Competitive Improvement of Estate Crops and Horticultural Products
  - Assistant Deputy for Competitive Improvement of Animal Husbandry Products
- Deputy for Affordable Food and Food Security Coordination (Deputy III)
  - Deputy III Secretariat
  - Assistant Deputy for Food Reserves and Food Aid
  - Assistant Deputy for Sustainable Forest Management
  - Assistant Deputy for Food and Nutrition Security and Quality
  - Assistant Deputy for Circular Economy and Environmental Impacts
  - Assistant Deputy for Food Production and Climate Change
- Deputy for Maritime Resources Coordination (Deputy IV)
  - Deputy IV Secretariat
  - Assistant Deputy for Marine and Spatial Maritime Management
  - Assistant Deputy for Capture Fisheries Management
  - Assistant Deputy for Aquaculture Management
  - Assistant Deputy for Competitive Improvement of Maritime Resources
  - Assistant Deputy for Facilities and Infrastructures Management of Marine and Fisheries
- Board of Experts
  - Senior Expert to the Minister on Digital Transformation and Interinstitutional Relationship
  - Senior Expert to the Minister on Connectivity Management
  - Senior Expert to the Minister on Maritime Economy

== Coordinated agencies ==
Based on the Presidential Decree No. 147/2024, these ministries are placed under the coordinating ministry:

- Ministry of Agriculture
- Ministry of Forestry
- Ministry of Marine Affairs and Fisheries
- Ministry of Environment
- National Food Agency
- National Nutrition Agency
