= Ministry of Tourism (Indonesia) =

Government ministry

- Kementerian Pariwisata
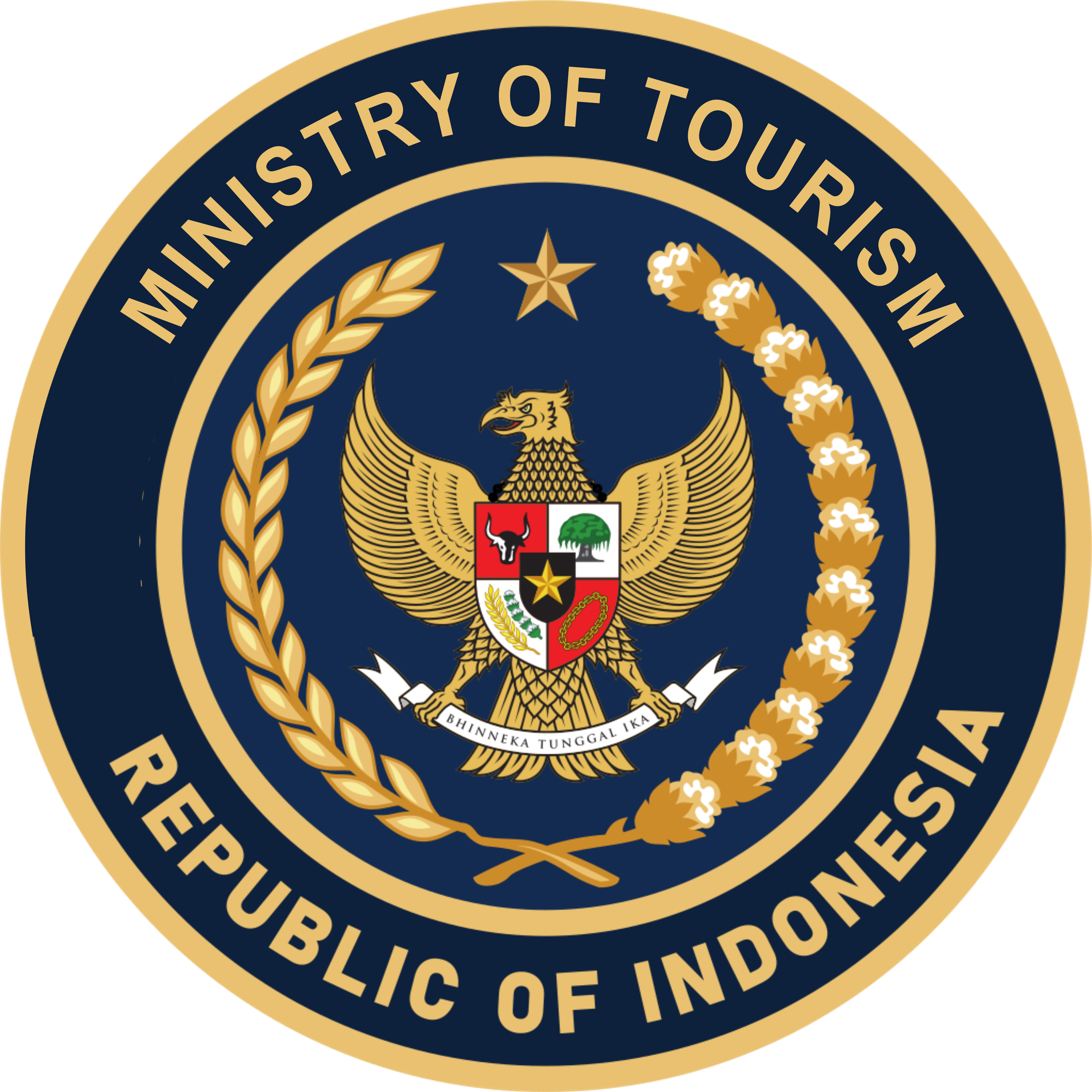
- Seal of the Ministry of Tourism

- Ministry of Tourism headquarters (right)

Ministry overview
- Formed: 10 July 1959
- Preceding agencies: Department of Tourism, Posts, and Telecommunications (1990s); Department of Tourism, Art, and Culture (1998); State Ministry of Tourism and Art; Department of Tourism and Culture (1999–2001); State Ministry of Culture and Tourism (2001–2004); Ministry of Culture and Tourism (2004–2009); Ministry of Tourism and Creative Economy (2009–2014; 2019–2024)
- Jurisdiction: Government of Indonesia
- Headquarters: Sapta Pesona building Jalan Medan Merdeka Barat No. 17 Jakarta Pusat 10110 Jakarta, Indonesia
- Minister responsible: Widiyanti Putri, Minister of Tourism
- Deputy Minister responsible: Ni Luh Puspa, Deputy Minister of Tourism
- Website: kemenpar.go.id/en

The Ministry of Tourism (Indonesian: Kementerian Pariwisata) (abbreviated as Kemenpar) is a ministry of the Indonesian government concerned with the administration of tourism. Its name and scope have changed numerous times since its inception until the present day.

== History and name changes ==
In the 1990s, tourism was overseen by the Department of Tourism, Posts, and Telecommunications (Indonesian: Departemen Pariwisata, Pos dan Telekomunikasi)

In 1998, during the short-lived Seventh Development Cabinet, the ministry was split into the Department of Tourism, Art, and Culture (Indonesian: Departemen Pariwisata, Seni, dan Budaya) and the Department of Transportation (Indonesian: Departemen Perhubungan), which subsumed the posts and telecommunications portfolios. It became the State Ministry of Tourism and Art (Indonesian: Menteri Negara Pariwisata dan Kesenian) and eventually the Department of Tourism and Culture (Indonesian: Departemen Kebudayaan dan Pariwisata) during Gus Dur's National Unity Cabinet (1999–2001). The department's name changed once more, to the State Ministry of Culture and Tourism, during Megawati's presidency (2001–2004), and again to the Ministry of Culture and Tourism, during the first term of Susilo Bambang Yudhoyono's presidency (2004–2009). During his second term (2009–2014), it became the Ministry of Tourism and Creative Economy, and cultural responsibilities were transferred to the Ministry of Education and Culture.

In 2014, the ministry acquired its present name, after President Joko Widodo announced his cabinet lineup. Widodo spun off the creative economy portfolio into a separate organisation, named the Creative Economy Agency (Indonesian: Badan Ekonomi Kreatif). However, he reversed his decision during his second administration (2019–2024), and the agency was re-merged into the Ministry of Tourism, becoming the Ministry of Tourism and Creative Economy once more. It acquired its present name during the presidency of Prabowo Subianto.

== Logos ==
Department of Tourism, Posts, and Telecommunications (1983–1998)

Department of Tourism, Art, and Culture/State Ministry of Tourism and Art/Department of Tourism and Culture (1998–2001)

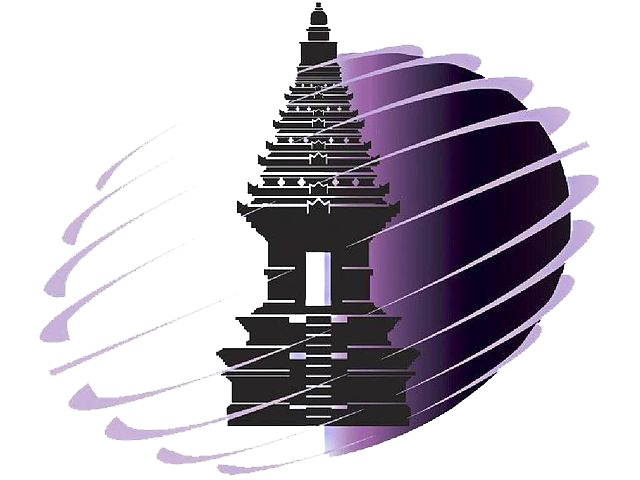
Ministry logo (Sapta Pesona building)

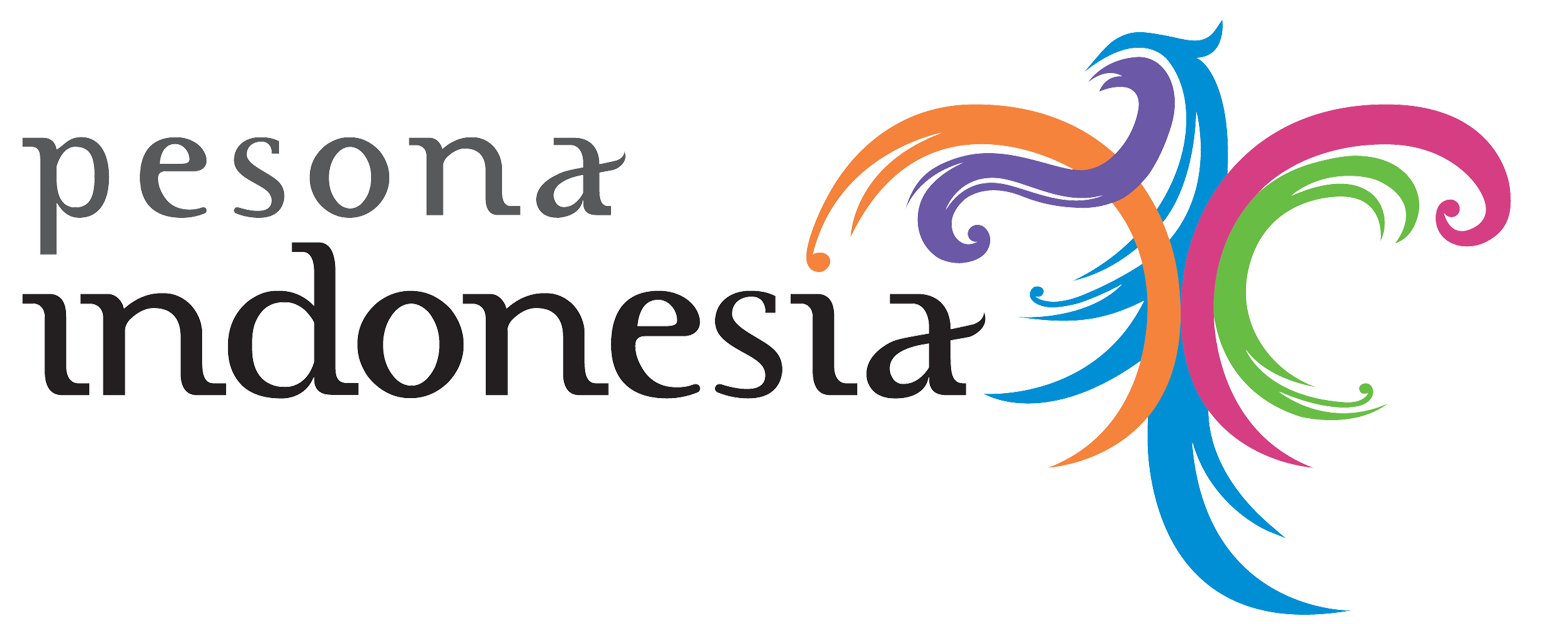
Ministry of Tourism (2014–2020)

Ministry of Tourism and Creative Economy (2020–2024)
