= Hanif Faisol Nurofiq =

Indonesian politician (born 1971)

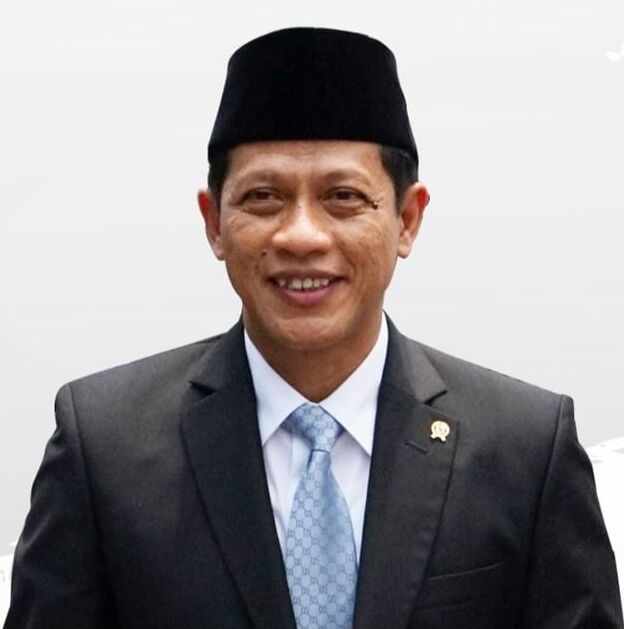

11th Minister of Environment
- Incumbent
- Assumed office 21 October 2024
- President: Prabowo Subianto
- Deputy: Diaz Hendropriyono
- Preceded by: Siti Nurbaya Bakar (as Minister of Environment and Forestry)

1st Head of the Environmental Control Agency
- Incumbent
- Assumed office 21 October 2024
- President: Prabowo Subianto
- Deputy: Diaz Hendropriyono
- Preceded by: Office established

Personal details
- Born: 21 March 1971 (age 55) Bojonegoro, East Java
- Party: PAN (since 2024)
- Other political affiliations: Independent
- Spouse: Sulikah Hanif Faisal Nurofiq

Hanif Faisol Nurofiq (born 21 March 1971) is an Indonesian politician serving as the Minister of Environment since 2024 in the Red and White Cabinet of Indonesian President Prabowo Subianto. From 2023 to 2024, he served as the Director General of Forestry Planning and Environmental Management under the previous Ministry of Environment and Forestry.

== Education ==
Hanif received his bachelor's and master's degrees at the Faculty of Forestry from Lambung Mangkurat University (UNLAM), South Kalimantan. He then earned a Doctorate in Environmental Studies from Brawijaya University, Malang.

== Career ==
Hanif's career began in the forestry sector through the Department of Forestry, by participating in the Forest Ranger or Wirawana program of the Ministry of Environment and Forestry (KLHK). In 1993, he started as a data entry staff in South Kalimantan and was appointed as the head of Forest Management Resort in North Laut Island, Forest Management Unit (KPH) Kota Baru in 1995. In 1997, he was appointed as the head of the Forest Management Unit (BKPH) Sungai Kupang in South Kalimantan and promoted to the head of BKPH in Batulicin in 1999.

In 2000, he became the head of Forest Product Distribution Affairs at the Sungai Kupang Forestry Service Branch. In 2007, he was made the head of the Forest Products Marketing Section at the Tanah Bumbu Regency Forestry Service Branch.

In 2016 he was appointed as the head of the Forestry Service in South Kalimantan for seven years before his promotion to Director General in 2023.
