= List of coordinating ministers for political and security affairs =

Here was the list of Coordinating Minister for Political and Security Affairs (and its former name) since its inception.

No.	Portrait	Minister	Took office	Left office	Time in office	Party	Cabinet	Ref.
1	General (Ret.) Maraden Panggabean	General (Ret.) Maraden Panggabean (1922–2000); Coordinating Minister for Political and Security Affairs	31 March 1978	19 March 1983	4 years, 353 days	Golkar	Development III	
2	General (Ret.) Surono Reksodimedjo	General (Ret.) Surono Reksodimedjo (1923–2010); Coordinating Minister for Political and Security Affairs	19 March 1983	21 March 1988	5 years, 2 days	Golkar	Development IV	
3	Admiral (Ret.) Sudomo	Admiral (Ret.) Sudomo (1926–2012); Coordinating Minister for Political and Security Affairs	23 March 1988	17 March 1993	4 years, 359 days	Golkar	Development V	
4	General (Hon.) (Ret.) Susilo Sudarman	General (Hon.) (Ret.) Susilo Sudarman (1926–1997); Coordinating Minister for Political and Security Affairs	17 March 1993	18 December 1997	4 years, 276 days	Golkar	Development VI	
–	Lieutenant General (Ret.) Yogie Suardi Memet	Lieutenant General (Ret.) Yogie Suardi Memet (1929–2007); Acting; Coordinating Minister for Political and Security Affairs	18 December 1997	14 March 1998	86 days	Golkar	Development VI	
5	General (Ret.) Feisal Tanjung	General (Ret.) Feisal Tanjung (1939–2013); Coordinating Minister for Political and Security Affairs	14 March 1998	20 October 1999	1 year, 220 days	Golkar	Development VII; Development Reform	
6	General (Ret.) Wiranto	General (Ret.) Wiranto (born 1947); Coordinating Minister for Political and Security Affairs	26 October 1999	15 February 2000	112 days	Independent	National Unity	
7	General (Hon.) (Ret.) Soerjadi Soedirdja	General (Hon.) (Ret.) Soerjadi Soedirdja (1939–2021); Coordinating Minister for Political, Social, and Security Affairs	15 February 2000	23 August 2000	190 days	Independent	National Unity	
8	General (Hon.) (Ret.) Susilo Bambang Yudhoyono	General (Hon.) (Ret.) Susilo Bambang Yudhoyono (born 1949); Coordinating Minister for Political, Social, and Security Affairs	23 August 2000	1 June 2001	282 days	Independent	National Unity	
9	General (Hon.) (Ret.) Agum Gumelar	General (Hon.) (Ret.) Agum Gumelar (born 1945); Coordinating Minister for Political, Social, and Security Affairs	1 June 2001	23 July 2001	52 days	Independent	National Unity	
(8)	General (Hon.) (Ret.) Susilo Bambang Yudhoyono	General (Hon.) (Ret.) Susilo Bambang Yudhoyono (born 1949); Coordinating Minister for Political and Security Affairs	10 August 2001	12 March 2004	2 years, 215 days	Independent	Mutual Assistance	
–	General (Hon.) (Ret.) Hari Sabarno	General (Hon.) (Ret.) Hari Sabarno (1944–2019); Acting; Coordinating Minister for Political and Security Affairs	12 March 2004	20 October 2004	222 days	Independent	Mutual Assistance	
10	Admiral (Ret.) Widodo Adi Sutjipto	Admiral (Ret.) Widodo Adi Sutjipto (1944–2026); Coordinating Minister for Political, Legal, and Security Affairs	21 October 2004	20 October 2009	4 years, 364 days	Independent	United Indonesia	
11	Air Chief Marshal (Ret.) Djoko Suyanto	Air Chief Marshal (Ret.) Djoko Suyanto (born 1950); Coordinating Minister for Political, Legal, and Security Affairs	22 October 2009	20 October 2014	4 years, 363 days	Independent	United Indonesia II	
12	Admiral (Ret.) Tedjo Edhy Purdijatno	Admiral (Ret.) Tedjo Edhy Purdijatno (born 1952); Coordinating Minister for Political, Legal, and Security Affairs	27 October 2014	12 August 2015	289 days	NasDem	Working	
13	General (Hon.) (Ret.) Luhut Binsar Panjaitan	General (Hon.) (Ret.) Luhut Binsar Panjaitan (born 1947); Coordinating Minister for Political, Legal, and Security Affairs	12 August 2015	27 July 2016	350 days	Golkar	Working	
(6)	General (Ret.) Wiranto	General (Ret.) Wiranto (born 1947); Coordinating Minister for Political, Legal, and Security Affairs	27 July 2016	20 October 2019	3 years, 85 days	Hanura	Working	
14	Prof. Mahfud MD	Prof. Mahfud MD (born 1957); Coordinating Minister for Political, Legal, and Security Affairs	23 October 2019	2 February 2024	4 years, 102 days	Independent	Onward Indonesia	
–	Police General (Ret.) Tito Karnavian	Police General (Ret.) Tito Karnavian (born 1964); Acting; Coordinating Minister for Political, Legal, and Security Affairs	2 February 2024	21 February 2024	19 days	Independent	Onward Indonesia	
15	Air Chief Marshal (Ret.) Hadi Tjahjanto	Air Chief Marshal (Ret.) Hadi Tjahjanto (born 1963); Coordinating Minister for Political, Legal, and Security Affairs	21 February 2024	20 October 2024	242 days	Independent	Onward Indonesia	
16	Police General (Ret.) Budi Gunawan	Police General (Ret.) Budi Gunawan (born 1959); Coordinating Minister for Political and Security Affairs	21 October 2024	8 September 2025	322 days	Independent	Red and White	
—	General (HOR) (Ret.) Sjafrie Sjamsoeddin	General (HOR) (Ret.) Sjafrie Sjamsoeddin (born 1952); Acting; Coordinating Minister for Political and Security Affairs	8 September 2025	17 September 2025	9 days	Independent	Red and White	
17	General (HOR) (Ret.) Djamari Chaniago	General (HOR) (Ret.) Djamari Chaniago (born 1949); Coordinating Minister for Political and Security Affairs	17 September 2025	1 October 2026	1 year, 14 days	Independent	Red and White	
18	General (Ret.) Dudung Abdurrachman	General (Ret.) Dudung Abdurrachman (born 1965); Coordinating Minister for Political and Security Affairs	1 October 2026	Present	24 days	Independent	Red and White	

== See also ==
- Coordinating Ministry for Political and Security Affairs
