= Coordinating Ministry for Legal, Human Rights, Immigration, and Correction =

Government ministry of Indonesia

- Kementerian Koordinator Bidang Hukum, Hak Asasi Manusia, Imigrasi, dan Pemasyarakatan

Coordinating Ministry overview
- Formed: 19 August 1945; 81 years ago (as Department of Justice); 23 November 1963; 62 years ago (as coordinating ministry form, first iteration)
- Preceding agencies: Ministry of Law and Human Rights; Deputy for Law and Human Rights Coordination (Deputy III), Coordinating Ministry for Political, Legal, and Security Affairs
- Jurisdiction: Government of Indonesia
- Headquarters: Jalan H.R. Rasuna Said Kav. 6-7 Jakarta Selatan 12940 Jakarta, Indonesia
- Ministers responsible: Yusril Ihza Mahendra, Coordinating Minister; Otto Hasibuan, Deputy Coordinating Minister
- Website: kumham-imipas.go.id

The Coordinating Ministry for Legal, Human Rights, Immigration, and Correction (Note: Indonesian: Kementerian Koordinator Bidang Hukum, Hak Asasi Manusia, Imigrasi, dan Pemasyarakatan, abbreviated as Kemenko Kumhamimipas.) is an Indonesian ministry that coordinate the administration of laws, human rights, immigrations, and corrections. Previously named as Ministry of Law and Human Rights, it was changed to a Coordinating Ministry by president Prabowo Subianto. The ministry reports to the president and led by a Coordinating Minister, Yusril Ihza Mahendra, since 20 October 2024.

== History ==
=== Nomenclature ===
The Ministry of Law and Human Rights was established on 19 August 1945 as the Department of Justice (Departemen Kehakiman). The preceding agency in the Dutch Colonial Era was Departemen Van Justitie, based on Herdeland Yudie Staatblad No. 576.

The then Department of Justice was split into two: the Department of Justice and another part than spun off from the Department of Justice was briefly made into coordinating ministry form during Sukarno's Fourth Working Cabinet as Compartment Ministry of Law and Internal Affairs on 23 November 1963 and was led by Dr. Wirjono Prodjodikoro, a law lecturer, then professor, at University of Indonesia until he was reshuffled on Dwikora Cabinet to become Chief Justice of the Supreme Court of Indonesia. Dr. Wirjono was replaced by Sartono, a lawyer and a master of Dutch law, when the Revised Dwikora Cabinet established. During its existence, Compartment Ministry of Law and Internal Affairs possessed such massive power in Indonesian judiciary system, as the compartment ministry is supervising and coordinated Department of Home Affairs, the Supreme Court, and the Attorney General, in which the three were subordinate to the ministry. The Compartment Ministry reverted into its Department of Justice form when the Revised Dwikora Cabinet dissolved on 27 March 1966 and Dr. Wirjono became the Minister of Justice, only to became subordinate of the Office of Deputy Prime Minister for Social and Political Affairs led by Adam Malik during Second Revised Dwikora Cabinet. When Ampera Cabinet formed, Department of Justice fully become technical ministry.

Since that, Department of Justice retained the form until 2001. In 2001–2004, the ministry was known as the Department of Law and Legislation (Departemen Hukum dan Perundang-Undangan). From 2004 to 2009, the ministry was known as the Department of Law and Human Rights (Departemen Hukum dan Hak Asasi Manusia). Since 2009, it has been known as the Ministry of Justice and Human Rights (Kementerian Hukum dan Hak Asasi Manusia).

=== Responsibility ===
The Department of Justice, as of 1945, was responsible for matters of court, jail, and attorneys. Its responsibilities were expanded to include the Attorney and Topography Agency in 1945. However, the Topography Agency was transferred to the Department of Defense in 1946. The creation of the Department of Religious Affairs resulted in the transfer of the Islamic High Court (Mahkamah Islam Tinggi) to the new department on 3 January 1946. Since 22 July 1960, the Attorney General's Office has been elevated into a position that is equal to a ministerial office. Thus, the Attorney General has been independent of the Minister of Justice since then. The transfer of the General Court (Peradilan Umum) and State Administration Court (Pengadilan Tata Usaha Negara) to the Supreme Court (Mahkamah Agung) was started in 1999 and finished on 31 March 1999. Thus, the Ministry has different responsibilities.

=== Re-elevation and division ===
Until the Onward Indonesia Cabinet, the ministry was named the Ministry of Law and Human Rights, which primarily focused on coordinating, managing, and developing state matters in legal affairs, human rights, immigration, and correction. Due to the broad focus and responsibilities of the Ministry of Law and Human Rights on the Red and White Cabinet, President Prabowo Subianto split the Ministry of Law and Human Rights into four ministries:

- Coordinating Ministry for Legal, Human Rights, Immigration, and Correction (coordinating ministry)
- Ministry of Law (technical ministry)
- Ministry of Human Rights (technical ministry)
- Ministry of Immigration and Correction (technical ministry)

== Organization ==
Based on the Presidential Decree No. 142/2024 and as expanded by Coordinating Minister for Legal, Human Rights, Immigration, and Correction Decree No. 1/2024, the Coordinating Ministry for Legal, Human Rights, Immigration, and Correction is organized into the following:

- Office of the Coordinating Minister for Legal, Human Rights, Immigration, and Correction
- Office of the Vice Coordinating Minister for Legal, Human Rights, Immigration, and Correction
- Coordinating Ministry Secretariat
  - Bureau of Human Resources, Organization, and Legal Affairs
  - Bureau of Performance Management and Collaboration
  - Bureau of Public Relations and Information Technology
  - Bureau of General Affairs and Finance
    - Division of Executive Administration and Protocol
      - Subdivision of Coordinating Minister and Vice Coordinating Minister Administration
      - Subdivision of Coordinating Minister Secretariat Administration
      - Subdivision of Coordinating Minister Advisors Administration
      - Subdivision of Protocols
    - Division of Household Affairs dan Procurement Services
      - Subdivision of Household Affairs and State-Owned Assets
      - Subdivision of Procurement Services
- Inspectorate
- Deputy for Law Coordination (Deputy I)
  - Deputy I Secretariat
  - Assistant Deputy for Coordination of Law Administration
  - Assistant Deputy for Coordination of Utilization, Empowerment, and Protection of Intellectual Property
  - Assistant Deputy for Coordination of Legal Matters and Restorative Justice
  - Assistant Deputy for Coordination of Legal Culture, Information, and Coordination
  - Assistant Deputy for Coordination of Legislation and Litigation
- Deputy for Human Rights Coordination (Deputy II)
  - Deputy II Secretariat
  - Assistant Deputy for Coordination of Human Rights Policy
  - Assistant Deputy for Coordination of Serious Human Rights Violations Resolution
  - Assistant Deputy for Coordination of Human Rights Development and Cooperation
  - Assistant Deputy for Coordination of Empowerment and Advancement of the Rights of Vulnerable Groups
  - Assistant Deputy for Coordination of Human Rights Education
- Deputy for Immigration and Correction Coordination (Deputy III)
  - Deputy III Secretariat
  - Assistant Deputy for Coordination of Immigration Governance
  - Assistant Deputy for Coordination of Immigration Service Strategies
  - Assistant Deputy for Coordination of Correction Governance
  - Assistant Deputy for Coordination of Correction Service Strategies
  - Assistant Deputy for Coordination of Cooperation in Immigration and Correctional Affairs
- Board of Experts
  - Senior Expert to the Minister on Partnership and Interinstitutional Relations
  - Senior Expert to the Minister on Human Resources and Digital Transformation
  - Senior Expert to the Minister on Legal Reform
- Special Advisors to the Minister
  - Special Advisor to the Minister on Mass Communication
  - Special Advisor to the Minister on Politics and Society
  - Special Advisor to the Minister on Administration Affairs
  - Special Advisor to the Minister on Strategic Issues
  - Special Advisor to the Minister on Foreign Relations

== Coordinated agencies ==
Based on the Presidential Decree No. 142/2024, these ministries are placed under the coordinating ministry:

- Ministry of Law
- Ministry of Human Rights
- Ministry of Immigration and Correction
