= Coordinating Ministry for Political and Security Affairs =

Indonesian government ministry

- Kementerian Koordinator Bidang Politik dan Keamanan

Ministry overview
- Formed: 29 March 1978; 48 years ago
- Jurisdiction: Government of Indonesia
- Headquarters: Jalan Medan Merdeka Barat No. 15, Central Jakarta 10110 Jakarta, Indonesia
- Ministers responsible: Dudung Abdurachman, Coordinating Minister; Lodewijk Freidrich Paulus, Deputy Coordinating Minister
- Website: polkam.go.id

The Coordinating Ministry for Political and Security Affairs, (Note: Indonesian: Kementerian Koordinator Bidang Politik dan Keamanan, abbreviated as Kemenko Polkam.) previously known as the Coordinating Ministry for Political, Legal and Security Affairs, (Note: Indonesian: Kementerian Koordinator Bidang Politik, Hukum, dan Keamanan, abbreviated as Kemenko Polhukam.) is the Indonesian government ministry in charge of the planning and policy coordination, as well as synchronization of policies in the affairs of politics and national security. The Ministry is led by a Coordinating Minister (locally abbreviated as Menko). Throughout its history, the post was usually occupied by a retired armed forces high-ranking officer, but under Joko Widodo's cabinet, the position was previously held by a politician of civilian background, Mahfud MD. This position is currently held by Dudung Abdurachman, who was appointed on 1 October 2026.

== History ==
=== Founding History ===
The coordinating minister was formally established on 29 March 1978 during Suharto's Third Development Cabinet, although its precursor and predecessor can be traced during formation of Third Working Cabinet as Office of Deputy Minister/Coordinating Minister in Field of Defense and Security that formed 8 March 1962. The precursor office was changed names several times throughout Sukarno's Guided Democracy period until become the Office of Chief Minister of Political Affairs that retained until its dissolution on 11 October 1967.

When political turmoil period happened during early years of Suharto administration, various political and security disturbances happened such as Malari Incident, East Timor civil war and subsequent early phase of Indonesian invasion of East Timor, Suharto realized the needs of policy coordination due to there were difference stances taken by ministries and agencies related to defense and security (Ministry of Defense, Army, Navy, Air Forces, and Police). On 4 February 1974, in aftermath of escalated political and security violences during Malari Incident, Suharto founded National Council on Political and Security Stabilization (Dewan Stabilisasi Politik dan Keamanan Nasional, Dewan Polkam) direct predecessor of the current coordinating ministry. Dewan Polkam was chaired by the President, and membered by:

- Vice President,
- Minister of State Secretariat,
- Minister of Defense/Commander of the Indonesian Armed Forces (at that time both agencies still integrated and not separated like in present day),
- Minister of Home Affairs,
- Minister of Foreign Affairs,
- Minister of Information (predecessor of current Minister of Communication and Digital Affairs),
- State Minister of Economic, Finance, and Industries/Chairman of National Development Planning Agency (at that time both agencies still integrated and not separated like in present day),
- Attorney General, and
- Commander of Operational Command for the Restoration of Security and Order.

After his speech Penjelasan dan Pengumuman tentang Pembentukan Kabinet Pembangunan III (On Explanation and Announcement of Formation of Third Development Cabinet) and issuance of his Presidential Decree No. 59/M/1978 on the same day on 29 March 1978, Suharto had Dewan Polkam disestablished and turned the council into a coordinating ministry, which retained to this day.

=== Changes in name and functions ===
==== 2000 ====
The ministry was merged with the Coordinating Ministry for People's Welfare and Poverty Alleviation during the Abdurrahman Wahid administration in 2000, both in terms of function and the Ministries under it. In that period, the ministry was renamed as Coordinating Ministry for Political, Social and Security Affairs.

==== 2004 ====
Under the administration of the sixth president Susilo Bambang Yudhoyono, the ministry once again was renamed in the First United Indonesia Cabinet to Coordinating Ministry for Legal, Political and Security Affairs.

==== 2014 ====
Under the seventh president Joko Widodo, the ministry was renamed as Coordinating Ministry for Political, Legal and Security Affairs.

==== 2024 ====
After the eighth president Prabowo Subianto got elected in October 2024, Prabowo made some changes in the Red and White Cabinet and renamed the ministry to Coordinating Ministry for Political and Security Affairs, following split of Coordinating Ministry for Political, Legal and Security Affairs into Coordinating Ministry for Political and Security Affairs and Coordinating Ministry for Legal, Human Rights, Immigration, and Correction.

Following the split Coordinating Ministry for Political, Legal, and Security Affairs, the coordinating ministry relinquished its function in legal and human rights coordination and also relinquished control of one of its deputy, Deputy for Law and Human Rights Coordination, to the Coordinating Ministry for Legal, Human Rights, Immigration, and Correction by Presidential Decree No. 142/2024.

== Organization ==
Based on the Presidential Decree No. 141/2024 and as expanded by the Coordinating Minister for Political and Security Affairs Decree No. 6/2024, the Coordinating Ministry for Political and Security Affairs is organized into the following:

- Office of the Coordinating Minister for Political and Security Affairs
- Office of the Deputy Coordinating Minister for Political and Security Affairs
- Coordinating Ministry Secretariat
  - Bureau of Performance Management, Organization, and Partnerships
  - Bureau of Legal Affairs and Proceedings
    - Division of Proceedings
      - Subdivision of Proceedings Management
      - Subdivision of Papers and Proceeding Minutes
  - Bureau of General Affairs
    - Division of Administration
      - Subdivision of Coordinating Minister Administration
      - Subdivision of Coordinating Deputy Minister Administration
      - Subdivision of Coordinating Ministry Secretariat Administration
      - Subdivision of Coordinating Ministry Board of Experts Administration
      - Subdivision of General Services
      - Subdivision of Internal Supports
    - Division of Household Affairs
      - Subdivision of Household Affairs
      - Subdivision of State Properties
  - Bureau of Protocols, Storages, and Material Preparation
    - Division of Protocols and Security
      - Subdivision of Security
      - Subdivision of Material Preparation
  - Bureau of Public Relations, Data, and Information
- Inspectorate
- Deputy for Domestic Political Coordination (Deputy I)
  - Deputy I Secretariat
    - Division of Administration
    - Division of Performance Management
  - Assistant Deputy for Coordination of Mass Organizations
    - Division of Mass Organizations Strengthening
    - Division of Mass Organizations Monitoring
  - Assistant Deputy for Coordination of Decentralization and Regional Autonomy
    - Division of Decentralization
    - Division of Regional Autonomy
  - Assistant Deputy for Coordination of Democratic and Election Affairs
    - Division of Democracy Improvement
    - Division of Election Affairs
  - Assistant Deputy for Coordination of Special Autonomy
    - Division of Special Autonomy Policies
    - Division of Special Autonomy Management
  - Assistant Deputy for Coordination of Regional Administration and Population
    - Division of Regional Administration
- Deputy for Foreign Political Coordination (Deputy II)
  - Deputy II Secretariat
    - Division of Administration
  - Assistant Deputy for Coordination of Asian Partnerships
    - Division of East Asia, South Asia, and Central Asia Bilateral Partnership
    - Division of Southeast Asia and West Asia Bilateral Partnership
  - Assistant Deputy for Coordination of Americas and European Partnerships
    - Division of Americas Bilateral Partnership
    - Division of European Partnership
  - Assistant Deputy for Coordination of ASEAN Partnerships
    - Division of ASEAN Political and Defense Partnerships
    - Division of ASEAN Security and Law Enforcement Partnerships
  - Assistant Deputy for Coordination of Multilateral Partnerships
    - Division of International Defense and Security Partnerships
    - Division of International Political and Peace Partnerships
  - Assistant Deputy for Coordination of Pacific, Oceania, and Africa
    - Division of State Pacific and Oceania
- Deputy for State Defense and National Integrity Coordination (Deputy III)
  - Deputy III Secretariat
    - Division of Administration
  - Assistant Deputy for Coordination of Defense Doctrines and Strategies
    - Division of Defense Doctrines
    - Division of Defense Strategies
  - Assistant Deputy for Coordination of Security Intelligence and National Alertness
    - Division of Security Intelligence
    - Division of National Alertness
  - Assistant Deputy for Coordination of Borders and Spatial Defense
    - Division of Borders
    - Division of Spatial Defense
  - Assistant Deputy for Coordination of Defense Powers, Capabilities, and Partnerships
    - Division of Powers and Capabilities
    - Division of Defense Partnerships
  - Assistant Deputy for Coordination of National Integrity
    - Division of State Defense
    - Division of National Insight and Diversity
- Deputy for Security and Public Order Coordination (Deputy IV)
  - Deputy IV Secretariat
    - Division of Administration
    - Division of Performance
  - Assistant Deputy for Coordination of Security Intelligence, Public Guidance, and National Vital Objects
    - Division of Security Intelligence
    - Division of Public Guidance and National Vital Objects
  - Assistant Deputy for Coordination of Handling of Conventional Crimes and Crimes against State Wealth
    - Division of Conventional Crimes
    - Division of Crimes against State Wealth
  - Assistant Deputy for Coordination of Handling of Transnational Crimes and Extraordinary Crimes
    - Division of Transnational Crimes
    - Division of Extraordinary Crimes
  - Assistant Deputy for Coordination of Conflict Resolution and Transportation Security
    - Division of Conflict Resolution and Contingency
    - Division of Transportation Security
  - Assistant Deputy for Coordination of Law Enforcement
    - Division of Law Enforcement Apparatuses Enforcement
    - Division of Law Enforcement Apparatuses Institutions
- Deputy for Communication and Information Coordination (Deputy V)
  - Deputy V Secretariat
    - Division of Administration
    - Division of Performance
  - Assistant Deputy for Coordination of Communication Management and Public Information
    - Division of Public Communication Management
    - Division of Public Information Management
  - Assistant Deputy for Coordination of Communication Media and Information
    - Division of Mass Media
    - Division of Social Media and Community
  - Assistant Deputy for Coordination of Telecommunication and Informatics
    - Division of Telecommunication
    - Division of Informatics
  - Assistant Deputy for Coordination of Data Protection and Electronic Transactions
    - Division of Data Protection
  - Assistant Deputy for Coordination of Cybersecurity Prevention and Capacity Upgrading
    - Division of Cybersecurity Prevention and Monitoring
    - Division of Human Resources Capacity and Cyber Incident Management
- Board of Experts
  - Senior Expert to the Minister on Ideology and Constitutional Affairs
  - Senior Expert to the Minister on Regional Sovereignty and Maritime Affairs
  - Senior Expert to the Minister on Interinstitutional Relationship and Digital Transformation

== Coordinated agencies ==
Based on the Presidential Decree No. 141/2024, these ministries are placed under the coordinating ministry:

- Ministry of Home Affairs
- Ministry of Foreign Affairs
- Ministry of Defense
- Ministry of Communication and Digital Affairs
- Attorney General's Office
- National Armed Forces
- National Police

== List of ministers ==
1. Maraden Panggabean (1978–1983)
2. Surono Reksodimedjo (1983–1988)
3. Sudomo (1988–1993)
4. Susilo Sudarman (1993–1998)
5. Feisal Tanjung (1998–1999)
6. Wiranto (1999–2000; 2016–2019)
7. Soerjadi Soedirdja (2000)
8. Susilo Bambang Yudhoyono (2000–2001; 2001–2004)
9. Agum Gumelar (2001)
10. Widodo Adi Sutjipto (2004–2009)
11. Djoko Suyanto (2009–2014)
12. Tedjo Edhy Purdijatno (2014–2015)
13. Luhut Binsar Pandjaitan (2015–2016)
14. Mahfud MD (2019–2024)
15. Hadi Tjahjanto (2024)
16. Budi Gunawan (2024–2025)
17. Djamari Chaniago (2025–2026)
18. Dudung Abdurrachman (2026–)
