= Ministry of Environment (Indonesia) =

Government ministry of Indonesia

Ministry of Environment/ Environmental Control Agency
- Kementerian Lingkungan Hidup/ Badan Pengendalian Lingkungan Hidup Republik Indonesia
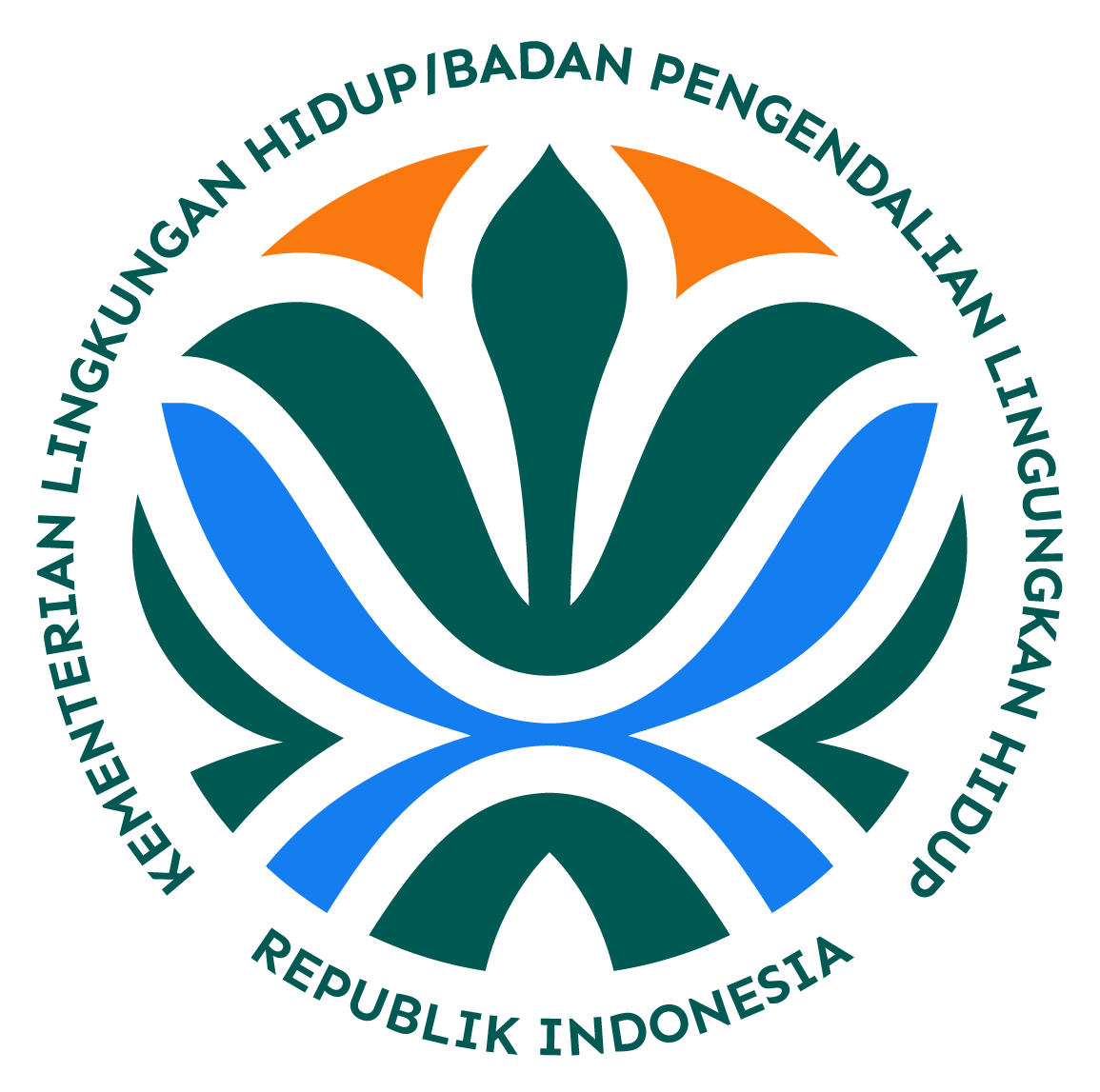

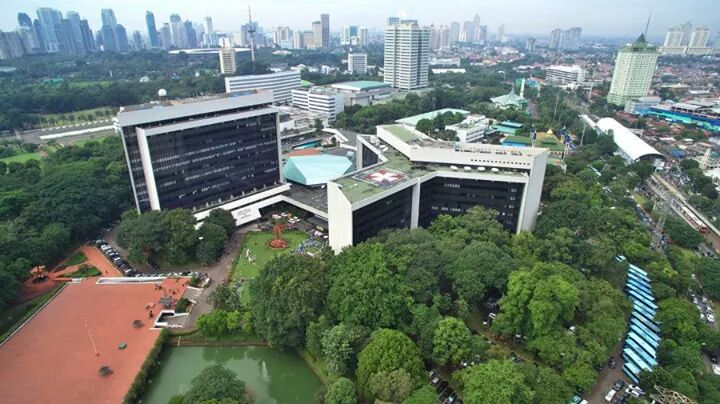
- Ministry of Environment headquarters, shared with the Ministry of Forestry

Ministry overview
- Formed: 1978
- Preceding Ministry: Ministry of Environment and Forestry
- Jurisdiction: Government of Indonesia
- Headquarters: Gedung Manggala Wanabakti; Jalan Jenderal Gatot Subroto, Central Jakarta, Jakarta, Indonesia
- Minister responsible: Hanif Faisol Nurofiq, Minister of Environment/ Environmental Control Agency
- Deputy Minister responsible: Diaz Hendropriyono, Deputy Minister of Environment/ Environmental Control Agency
- Parent department: Coordinating Ministry for Food Affairs
- Website: kemenlh.go.id

The Ministry of Environment/Environmental Control Agency (Indonesian: Kementerian Lingkungan Hidup/Badan Pengendalian Lingkungan Hidup) is a ministry of the Central Government of Indonesia that organizes government affairs in the environmental sector. The Environmental Control Agency is a non-ministerial government institution that carries out government duties in the field of environmental control.

The Ministry of Environment is led by a Minister of Environment who also heads the Environmental Control Agency, which since October 21, 2024 has been held by Hanif Faisol Nurofiq.

== History ==
During the Prabowo Subianto administration, the Ministry of Environment and Forestry was split into the Ministry of Forestry and the Ministry of Environment/Environmental Control Agency.

Here is the history of the name changes of the Ministry of Environment/Environmental Control Agency before the split:

- Office of the Minister of State for Development and Environmental Supervision (1978–1983)
- Office of the Minister of State for Population and Environment (1983–1993)
- Office of the Minister of State for Environment (1993–2009)
- Ministry of Environment (2009–2014)
- Ministry of Environment and Forestry (2014-2024)
- Ministry of Environment/Environmental Control Agency (2024-present)

=== Logo ===
Logo of the Office of the Minister of State/Ministry of Environment (1990s–2014)

Logo of the Ministry of Environment and Forestry (2014–2024)

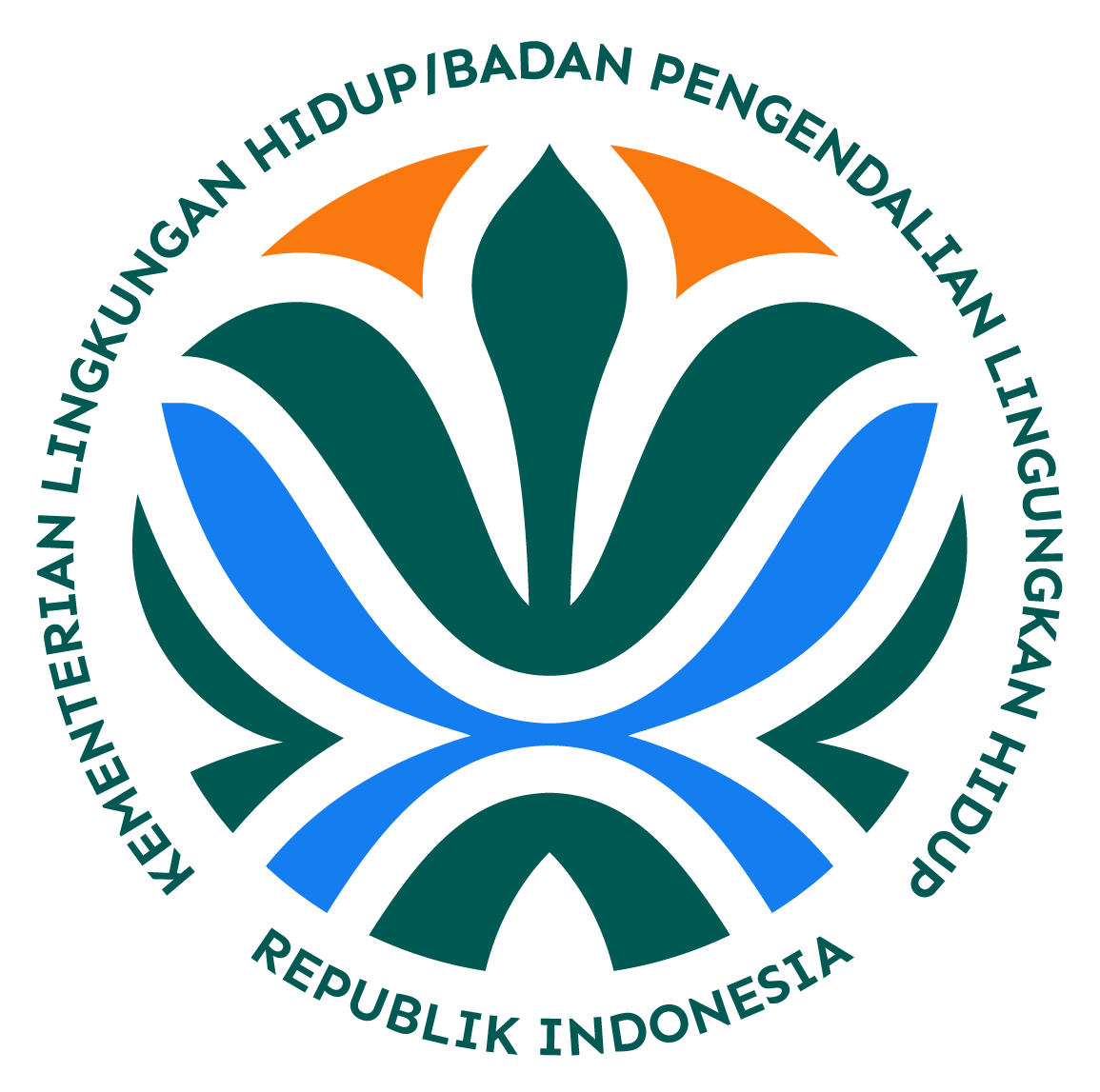
Logo of the Ministry of Environment/Environmental Control Agency (2024–present)

== Organizational structure ==
Based on Presidential Decree No. 182/2024 and 183/2024 and as expanded by Ministry of Environment/Environmental Control Agency Decree No. 1/2024, 9/2024, 8/2025, 10/2025, the Ministry of Environment/Environmental Control Agency is organized into the following:

- Office of the Minister of Environment/Environmental Control Agency
- Office of the Deputy Minister of Environment/Environmental Control Agency
- Office of the Ministry Secretariat/Main Secretariat
  - Bureau of Planning and Finance
  - Bureau of Human Resource Development and Organization
  - Bureau of General Affairs
    - Division of Equipment
    - Division of Household Affairs
    - Division of Procurement
    - Division of Leadership Administration
      - Subdivision of Minister and Deputy Minister of Environment/Head and Deputy Head of Environmental Control Agency Administration
      - Subdivision of Ministry Secretariat/Main Secretariat Administration
      - Subdivision of Board of Experts and Special Staffs Administration
    - Division of Deputy I Administration
    - Division of Deputy II Administration
    - Division of Deputy III Administration
    - Division of Deputy IV Administration
    - Division of Deputy V Administration
  - Bureau of Legal Affairs and Partnerships
  - Bureau of Public Relations
    - Division of Protocols
  - Centers (attached to the secretariat)
    - Center for Environmental Control of Sumatera, Pekanbaru
      - Center for Environmental Control of Sumatera, Regional I Division (Aceh and North Sumatera)
      - Center for Environmental Control of Sumatera, Regional II Division (West Sumatera, Riau, Riau Islands, and Jambi)
      - Center for Environmental Control of Sumatera, Regional III Division (Bengkulu, South Sumatera, Bangka Belitung, and Lampung)
    - Center for Environmental Control of Java, Yogyakarta
      - Center for Environmental Control of Java, Regional I Division (Banten, Jakarta, West Java)
      - Center for Environmental Control of Java, Regional II Division (Central Java and Yogyakarta)
      - Center for Environmental Control of Java, Regional III Division (East Java)
    - Center for Environmental Control of Kalimantan, Balikpapan
      - Center for Environmental Control of Kalimantan, Regional I Division (East Kalimantan and North Kalimantan)
      - Center for Environmental Control of Kalimantan, Regional II Division (South Kalimantan and Central Kalimantan)
      - Center for Environmental Control of Kalimantan, Regional III Division (West Kalimantan)
    - Center for Environmental Control of Bali and Nusa Tenggara, Denpasar
      - Center for Environmental Control of Bali and Nusa Tenggara, Regional I Division (Bali)
      - Center for Environmental Control of Bali and Nusa Tenggara, Regional II Division (West Nusa Tenggara)
      - Center for Environmental Control of Bali and Nusa Tenggara, Regional III Division (East Nusa Tenggara)
    - Center for Environmental Control of Sulawesi and Maluku, Makassar
      - Center for Environmental Control of Sulawesi and Maluku, Regional I Division (North Sulawesi, Gorontalo, and Central Sulawesi)
      - Center for Environmental Control of Sulawesi and Maluku, Regional II Division (West Sulawesi, South Sulawesi, and Southeast Sulawesi)
      - Center for Environmental Control of Sulawesi and Maluku, Regional III Division (Maluku and South Maluku)
    - Center for Environmental Control of Papua, Sorong
      - Center for Environmental Control of Papua, Regional I Division (Southwest Papua and West Papua)
      - Center for Environmental Control of Papua, Regional II Division (Papua and Highlands Papua)
      - Center for Environmental Control of Papua, Regional III Division (Central Papua and South Papua)
    - Center for Data, Information, and Technology
    - Center for Environmental Human Resources Development
    - Center for Environment-aware Generation Development
    - Center for Environmental Control Infrastructure
    - Center for Environmental Instruments Standardization
- Deputy for Environmental Management and Sustainable Natural Resources (Deputy I)
  - Directorate of Sustainable Natural Resources Management
  - Directorate of Environmental Damages Prevention caused by Regional Policies and Sectoral Affairs
  - Directorate of Environmental Damages Prevention caused by Industrial and Human Activities
  - Directorate of Terrestrial Waters Ecosystem Protection and Management
  - Directorate of Peat Ecosystem Protection and Management
  - Indonesian Institute of Peat and Mangrove Ecosystem Management, Jambi
  - Indonesian Institute of Peat and Mangrove Ecosystem Management, Pontianak
  - Indonesian Institute of Peat and Mangrove Ecosystem Management, Sorong
- Deputy for Pollution Control and Environmental Damage (Deputy II)
  - Directorate of Water Quality Protection and Management
  - Directorate of Air Quality Protection and Management
  - Directorate of Land Damage Control
  - Directorate of Biodiversity Conservation
  - Directorate of Pollution Control and Coastal and Sea Damage Control
- Deputy for Waste Management, Waste, and Hazardous and Toxic Materials (Deputy III)
  - Directorate of Waste Reduction and Circular Economy Development
  - Directorate of Waste Management
  - Directorate of Hazardous and Toxic Materials Management
  - Directorate of Hazardous and Toxic Materials and Non-hazardous and Non-toxic Waste Management
  - Directorate of Polluted Lands Recovery, Hazardous and Toxic Materials Waste Emergency Responses, and Non-hazardous and Non-toxic Waste Emergency Responses
- Deputy for Climate Change Control and Carbon Economic Value Management (Deputy IV)
  - Directorate of Climate Change Mitigation
  - Directorate of Climate Change Adaptation
  - Directorate of Green House Gases Inventory, Monitoring, Reporting, and Verification
  - Directorate of Carbon Economic Value Enforcement Administration
  - Directorate of Resource Mobilization for Controlling Climate Change
- Deputy for Environmental Law Enforcement (Deputy V)
  - Directorate of Environmental Reporting and Surveillance
    - Sub-directorate of Environmental Complaints Handling
    - Sub-directorate of Environmental Management Surveillance
  - Directorate of Environmental Dispute Resolution
    - Sub-directorate of Off-court Environmental Dispute Resolution
    - Sub-directorate of In-court Environmental Dispute Resolution
  - Directorate of Environmental Administrative Sanctions
    - Sub-directorate of Environmental Administrative Sanctions Administration
    - Sub-directorate of Environmental Administrative Sanctions Supervision
  - Directorate of Environmental Crime Law Enforcement
    - Sub-directorate of Environmental Crime Law Enforcement
    - Sub-directorate of Environmental Crime Law Enforcement Operational Supports
  - Directorate of Land Burning Control
    - Sub-directorate of Land Burning Prevention
    - Sub-directorate of Land Burning Responses
  - Indonesian Institute of Environmental Law Enforcement, Jambi
    - Regional Section I Office, Medan
      - Aceh Environmental Law Enforcement Outpost, Aceh
      - West Sumatera Environmental Law Enforcement Outpost, Padang
      - Riau Islands Environmental Law Enforcement Outpost, Batam
      - Riau Environmental Law Enforcement Outpost, Pekanbaru
      - Aceh Environmental Law Enforcement Outpost, Aceh
    - Regional Section II Office, Palembang
      - Bangka Belitung Environmental Law Enforcement Outpost, Pangkal Pinang
      - Bengkulu Environmental Law Enforcement Outpost, Bengkulu
      - Lampung Environmental Law Enforcement Outpost, Lampung
  - Indonesian Institute of Environmental Law Enforcement, Surabaya
    - Regional Section I Office, Surabaya
      - Banten Environmental Law Enforcement Outpost, Banten
      - Jakarta Environmental Law Enforcement Outpost, Jakarta
      - West Java Environmental Law Enforcement Outpost, Bandung
      - Yogyakarta Environmental Law Enforcement Outpost, Yogyakarta
    - Regional Section II Office, Denpasar
      - Bali I Environmental Law Enforcement Outpost, Mataram
      - Bali II Environmental Law Enforcement Outpost, Labuan Bajo
  - Indonesian Institute of Environmental Law Enforcement, Makassar
    - Regional Section I Office, Kendari
      - West Sulawesi Environmental Law Enforcement Outpost, Mamuju
    - Regional Section II Office, Palu
      - North Sulawesi Environmental Law Enforcement Outpost, Sulawesi
      - Gorontalo Environmental Law Enforcement Outpost, Gorontalo
  - Indonesian Institute of Environmental Law Enforcement, Banjarmasin
    - Regional Section I Office, Samarinda
      - North Kalimantan Environmental Law Enforcement Outpost, Tanjung Selor
    - Regional Section II Office, Pontianak
      - South Kalimantan Environmental Law Enforcement Outpost, Palangkaraya
  - Indonesian Institute of Environmental Law Enforcement, Sorong
    - Regional Section I Office, Ambon
      - North Maluku Environmental Law Enforcement Outpost, Sofifi
    - Regional Section II Office, Jayapura
      - Central Papua Environmental Law Enforcement Outpost, Nabire
      - Highland Papua Environmental Law Enforcement Outpost, Jayawijaya
      - South Papua Environmental Law Enforcement Outpost, Merauke
- Main Inspectorate
  - Main Inspectorate Administration
  - Inspectorate I
  - Inspectorate II
- Board of Experts
  - Senior Expert to the Minister for Inter-Institutional Relations between Central and Regional Governments
  - Senior Expert to the Minister for International Relations and Environmental Diplomacy
  - Senior Expert to the Minister for Sustainability of Biodiversity Resources and Socio-Cultural Affairs
  - Senior Expert to the Minister for Food Resources, Natural Resources, Energy, and Environmental Quality
