= Ministry of Housing and Residential Area =

Government ministry of Indonesia

Ministry of Housing and Residential Area of the Republic of Indonesia
- Kementerian Perumahan dan Kawasan Permukiman Republik Indonesia

Ministry overview
- Formed: 22 April 1978 as Office of the Junior Minister for Public Housing Affairs (under Department of Public Works); 3 November 2009 as Ministry of Public Housing
- Jurisdiction: Government of Indonesia
- Minister responsible: Maruarar Sirait, Ministry of Housing and Residential Area
- Website: pkp.go.id

The Ministry of Housing and Residential Area of the Republic of Indonesia (Indonesian: Kementerian Perumahan dan Kawasan Permukiman Republik Indonesia; abbreviated as KemenPKP) is an Indonesian government ministry that is responsible for housing and residential areas. The ministry reports to the president and is currently led by Maruarar Sirait, the Housing and Residential Area.

== History ==
Logo of Ministry of Public Housing (2009–2014)

First established on 22 April 1978 as Office of the Junior Minister for Public Housing, under Department of Public Works. Then around five years later, the office is separated from Department of Public Works as Office of State Minister of Public Housing.

In 1999, the office was upgraded to the Department of Settlement and Regional Development on 29 October 1999. Then on 23 August 2000, a cabinet and department reshuffle were carried out. The function of public works nomenclature was merged into this department so that it became the Department of Settlement and Regional Infrastructure. Four years late in 2004, this department became the Office of the Minister of State for Public Housing.

The Office of the State Minister was changed again to a Ministry of Public Housing on 3 November 2009 based on Presidential Regulation (Perpres) Number 47 of 2009.

On 27 October 2014, the ministry was merged into the Ministry of Public Works. Ten years later on 21 October 2024, the ministry was separated again as Ministry of Housing and Residential Area.

== Duties and functions ==
The ministry has the task of organizing government affairs in the field of housing and settlement area government subdivision which is the scope of government affairs in the field of public works to assist the president in organizing the government of the country. The Ministry carries out the following functions:

1. formulation, determination, and implementation of policies in the field of settlement area development, implementation of housing development in rural and urban areas, and implementation of governance and risk management;
2. implementation of technical guidance and supervision over the implementation of the ministry's affairs;
3. coordination of the implementation of tasks, coaching, and provision of administrative support to all elements of the organization within the ministry;
4. management of state property/assets that are the responsibility of the ministry;
5. supervision of the implementation of tasks within the ministry;
6. implementation of substantive support to all elements of the organization within the ministry; and
7. implementation of other functions assigned by the president.

== Organizational structure ==
According to Presidential Decree No. 191/2024, and as expanded by the Minister of Housing and Residential Area Regulation No. 1/2024 and 1/2025, the organizational structure of the ministry consists of

1. Office of the Minister of Housing
2. Office of the Deputy Minister of Housing
3. Board of Experts
  1. Senior Expert to the Minister on Agrarian, Integrative Development, and Spatial Management
  2. Senior Expert to the Minister on Social, Economy, Cultural, Science, Technology, Industry, and Environment
  3. Senior Expert to the Minister on Inter-institutional Partnership
  4. Senior Expert to the Minister on Financing System, Corruption Prevention, and Community Participation
4. Secretariat General
  1. Bureau of Planning and Cooperation
  2. Bureau of Human Resources and Organization
  3. Bureau of Finance and State-owned Properties
  4. Bureau of General Affairs
  5. Bureau of Legal Affairs
  6. Bureau of Public Communication
  7. Bureau of Procurement
  8. Centers (attached to the secretariat)
    1. Center for Data, Information, and Technology
    2. Center for Human Resources Development
5. Directorate General of Settlement Areas (Directorate General I)
  1. Secretariat for Directorate General of Settlement Areas
  2. Directorate of Settlement Areas Implementation System and Strategies
  3. Directorate of Preparation of Land, Facilities, Infrastructures, and General Utilities for Settlement Areas
  4. Directorate of Settlement Areas Development
  5. Directorate of Housing Businesses Fostering and Consumer Protection
  6. Directorate of Housing and Settlement Engineering
6. Directorate General of Rural Housing (Directorate General II)
  1. Secretariat for Directorate General of Rural Housing
  2. Directorate of Rural Housing Implementation System and Strategies
  3. Directorate of Preparation of Land, Licensing, and Residential for Rural Housing
  4. Directorate of Rural Housing Financing
  5. Directorate of Rural Housing Development
  6. Directorate of Rural Housing Improvement
7. Directorate General of Urban Housing (Directorate General III)
  1. Secretariat for Directorate General of Urban Housing
  2. Directorate of Settlement Areas Implementation System and Strategies
  3. Directorate of Preparation of Land, Licensing, and Residential for Urban Housing
  4. Directorate of Urban Housing Financing
  5. Directorate of Urban Housing Development
  6. Directorate of Urban Housing Improvement
8. Directorate General of Governance and Risk Control (Directorate General IV)
  1. Secretariat for Directorate General of Governance and Risk Control
  2. Directorate of Governance and Risk Implementation System and Strategies
  3. Directorate of Formulation for Housing and Settlement Financing
  4. Directorate of Efficiency System and Partnership for Development and Implementation
  5. Directorate of Public Openness, Transparency, and Accountability
  6. Directorate of Risk Control and Corruption Prevention
9. Inspectorate General
  1. Inspectorate General Secretariat
  2. Inspectorate I
  3. Inspectorate II
  4. Inspectorate III
  5. Investigation Inspectorate
10. Agencies for Implementation of Housing and Settlement Areas Provision
  1. Type "A" Institutes-level
    1. Agency for Implementation of Housing and Settlement Areas Provision for Sumatra II Region, Medan
    2. Agency for Implementation of Housing and Settlement Areas Provision for Sumatra III Region, Pekanbaru
    3. Agency for Implementation of Housing and Settlement Areas Provision for Sumatra IV Region, Jambi
    4. Agency for Implementation of Housing and Settlement Areas Provision for Sumatra V Region, Palembang
    5. Agency for Implementation of Housing and Settlement Areas Provision for Java I Region, Jakarta
    6. Agency for Implementation of Housing and Settlement Areas Provision for Java II Region, Bandung
    7. Agency for Implementation of Housing and Settlement Areas Provision for Java III Region, Yogyakarta
    8. Agency for Implementation of Housing and Settlement Areas Provision for Java IV Region, Surabaya
    9. Agency for Implementation of Housing and Settlement Areas Provision for Nusa Tenggara I Region, Mataram
    10. Agency for Implementation of Housing and Settlement Areas Provision for Kalimantan I Region, Pontianak
    11. Agency for Implementation of Housing and Settlement Areas Provision for Kalimantan II Region, Samarinda
    12. Agency for Implementation of Housing and Settlement Areas Provision for Sulawesi I Region, Manado
    13. Agency for Implementation of Housing and Settlement Areas Provision for Sulawesi II Region, Palu
    14. Agency for Implementation of Housing and Settlement Areas Provision for Sulawesi III Region, Makassar
    15. Agency for Implementation of Housing and Settlement Areas Provision for Papua I Region, Jayapura
  2. Type "B" Institutes-level
    1. Agency for Implementation of Housing and Settlement Areas Provision for Sumatra I Region, Banda Aceh
    2. Agency for Implementation of Housing and Settlement Areas Provision for Nusa Tenggara II Region, Kupang
    3. Agency for Implementation of Housing and Settlement Areas Provision for Maluku Region, Ambon
    4. Agency for Implementation of Housing and Settlement Areas Provision for Papua II Region, Sorong

== List of ministers ==
1. Cosmas Batubara (1983–1988)
2. Siswono Yudo Husodo (1998–1993)
3. Akbar Tanjung (1993–1998)
4. Theo L. Sambuaga (1998–1999)
5. Erna Witoelar (1999–2001)
6. Soenarno(2001–2004)
7. Muhammad Yusuf Asy'ari (2004–2009)
8. Suharso Monoarfa (2009–2011)
9. Djan Faridz (2011–2014)
10. Maruarar Sirait (2024–present)
