= Cosmas Batubara =

Indonesian politician (1938–2019)

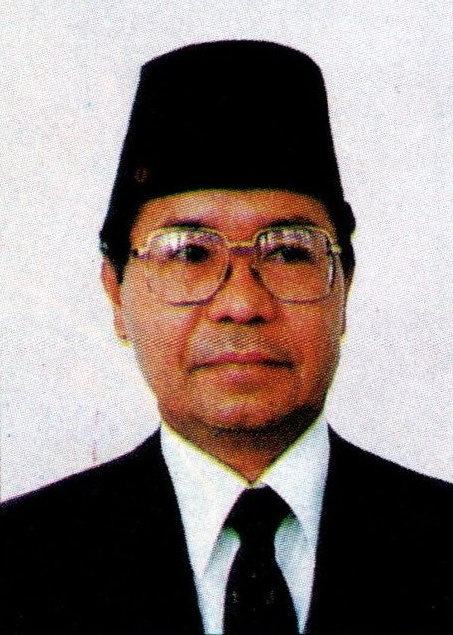
- Official portrait, 1983

Minister of Manpower
- In office 21 March 1988 – 17 March 1993
- President: Suharto
- Preceded by: Sudomo
- Succeeded by: Abdul Latief

State Minister for People's Housing
- In office 16 March 1983 – 21 March 1988
- President: Suharto
- Preceded by: Position established
- Succeeded by: Siswono Yudohusodo

Junior Minister for People's Housing
- In office 22 April 1978 – 16 March 1983
- President: Suharto
- Preceded by: Position established
- Succeeded by: John Wempi Wetipo (as Vice Minister of Public Works and People's Housing)

Personal details
- Born: 19 September 1938 Pulau Saribu, North Sumatra, Indonesia
- Died: 8 August 2019 (aged 80) Jakarta, Indonesia
- Party: Golkar
- Spouse: R. A. Cypriana Hadiwijono
- Education: University of Indonesia
- Occupation: Politician
- Profession: Politician; bussinessman
- Known for: Anti-communist activism, Co-founder of KAMI

Cosmas Batubara (19 September 1938 – 8 August 2019) was an Indonesian politician. He was chairman and the co-founder of KAMI, an Indonesian anti-communist student group. He was one of the strongest proponents for the banning of the Communist Party of Indonesia and the arrest of fifteen ministers, including Subandrio.

Batubara was a parliament member from 1967–1978. He was appointed the Junior Minister of Housing in Suharto's Third Development Cabinet in 1978 and the State Minister of Housing in the 1983 Fourth Development Cabinet. In 1988, he was appointed the Minister of Manpower in the Fifth Development Cabinet. In 1991, he was appointed President of the International Labour Organization.

== Honours ==
=== Nagional ===
- Indonesia :
  - Star of Mahaputera, Adipradana (17 August 1982)

=== Foreign ===
- South Korea :
  - Heungin Medal of the Order of Diplomatic Service Merit
