= Coordinating Ministry for Downstreaming and Energy Transition =

- Kementerian Koordinator Bidang Hilirisasi dan Transisi Energi

Ministry overview
- Formed: 1 October 2026
- Jurisdiction: Government of Indonesia
- Minister responsible: Bahlil Lahadalia, Coordinating Minister

The Coordinating Ministry for Downstreaming and Energy Transition is an Indonesian government ministry in charge of planning and policy coordination, as well as synchronization of policies in the field of downstreaming and energy transition affairs. The ministry is led by a Coordinating Minister, which is currently held by Bahlil Lahadalia since 1 October 2026.

Appointment of Bahlil as coordinating minister at this coordinating ministry also quite unusual, in which he served the post concurrently with his post at Ministry of Energy and Mineral Resources, making him to be only Indonesian politician that served as a coordinating minister and a technical minister.

== Coordinated Ministries/Agencies ==
While the full roll of the coordinated ministries/agencies are yet to be finalized, during the 1 October 2026 reshuffle, some ministers confirmed that these ministries going to be placed under this coordinating ministry:

- Ministry of Energy and Mineral Resources
- Ministry of Investment and Downstream Industry
