= Ministry of Creative Economy =

Government ministry of Indonesia

Ministry of Creative Economy/ Creative Economy Agency
- Kementerian Ekonomi Kreatif/ Badan Ekonomi Kreatif

Ministry overview
- Formed: 20 January 2015 as Creative Economy Agency 5 November 2024 as Ministry of Creative Economy/Creative Economy Agency
- Preceding agencies: Ministry of Tourism and Creative Economy (2011–2014; 2019–2024); Creative Economy Agency (2014–2019)
- Jurisdiction: Government of Indonesia
- Headquarters: Autograph Tower Thamrin Nine Jalan M.H. Thamrin No. 33 Central Jakarta, Jakarta, Indonesia
- Minister responsible: Teuku Riefky Harsya, Ministry of Creative Economy/Creative Economy Agency
- Deputy Minister responsible: Irene Umar, Deputy Ministry of Creative Economy/Deputy Creative Economy Agency
- Parent department: Coordinating Ministry for Social Empowerment
- Website: ekraf.go.id

The Ministry of Creative Economy is a ministry within the Indonesian government that organizes the creative economy government sub-division, which is the scope of government affairs in the tourism sector. The Creative Economy Agency is a Non-Ministerial Government Institution that carries out government duties in the creative economy sector.

This ministry/Bekraf was formed by Indonesian President Prabowo Subianto in the Red and White Cabinet.

== History ==
The creative economy sector was initially part of the Ministry of Tourism and Creative Economy, formed in the Second United Indonesia Cabinet from 2011 to 2014. In the Working Cabinet, President Joko Widodo then formed the Creative Economy Agency through Presidential Regulation Number 6 of 2015. In the next government period, Joko Widodo changed the name of this institution to the Tourism and Creative Economy Agency. In the Red and White Cabinet, President Prabowo Subianto separated tourism and the creative economy into two separate ministries so that the creative economy agency is under the Ministry of Creative Economy.

== Organizational structure ==
The ministry, as Presidential Decree No. 199/2024 outlined, is the planning, regulating, and decision-making of the creative economy policies in Indonesia. The ministry is organized in the following manner:

- Office of the Ministry of Creative Economy
- Office of the Deputy Ministry of Creative Economy
- Ministry Secretariat
- Board of Experts
  - Senior Expert to the Minister for Research, Education, and Institutional Relations
  - Senior Expert to the Minister for Funding and Financing
  - Senior Expert to the Minister for Marketing Systems and Infrastructure
  - Senior Expert to the Minister for Intellectual Property and Digital Transformation

As Presidential Decree No. 200/2024 outlined, the agency had the role of executioner and controlling the implementation of the creative economy policies in Indonesia. The agency is organized in the following manner:

- Office of the Head of Creative Economy Agency
- Office of the Deputy Head of Creative Economy
- Agency Secretariat
- Deputy for Strategic Development of the Creative Economy
- Deputy for Cultural Creativity and Design
- Deputy for Digital Creativity and Technology
- Deputy for Media Creativity
- Inspectorate

== Gallery ==
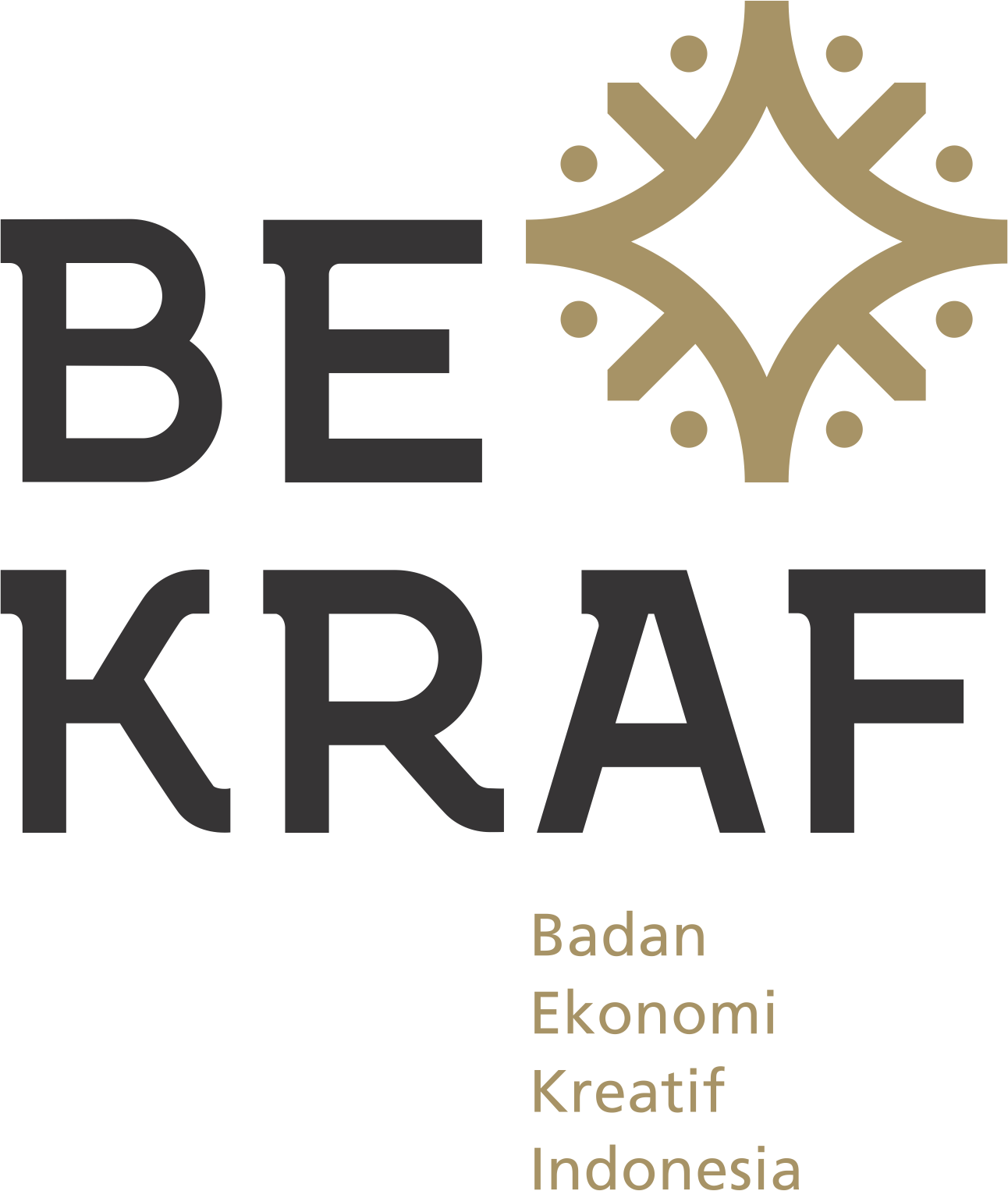
Seal of the Creative Economy Agency (2015–2019)

Seal of the Ministry of Tourism and Creative Economy (2020–2024)

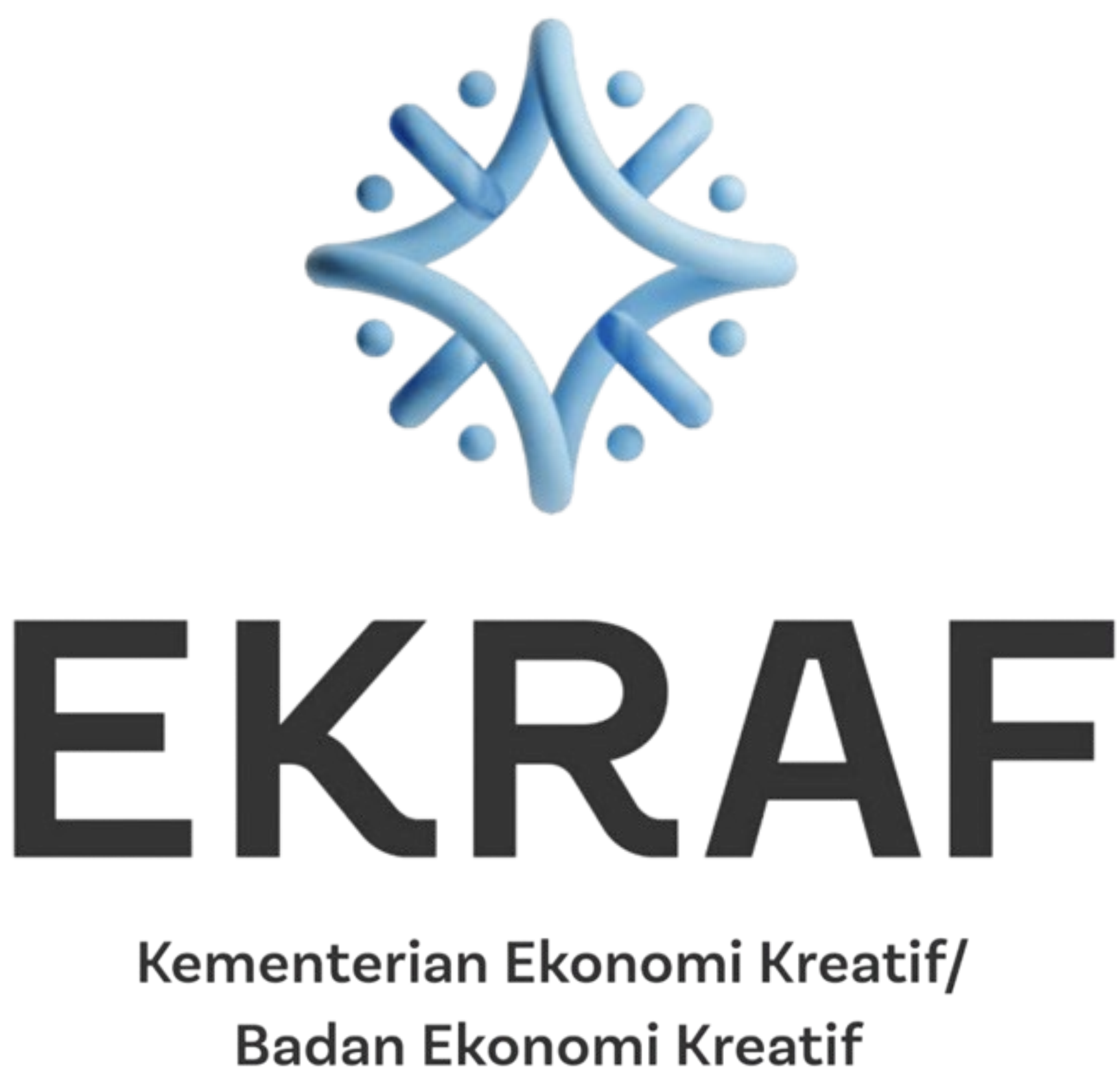
Seal of the Ministry of Creative Economy/Creative Economy Agency (2024–present)
