= Dudy Purwagandhi =

Indonesian politician (born 1970)

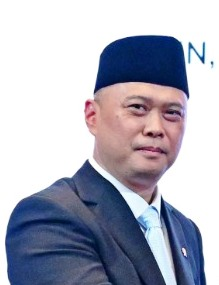

33rd Minister of Transportation
- Incumbent
- Assumed office 21 October 2024
- President: Prabowo Subianto
- Preceded by: Budi Karya Sumadi

Personal details
- Born: 23 September 1970 (age 55)
- Party: PAN (since 2024)
- Other political affiliations: Independent

Dudy Purwagandhi (born 23 September 1970) is an Indonesian politician serving as minister of transport since 2024. He served as director of Jhonlin Air Transport from 2008 to 2009, and has been a commissioner of Perusahaan Listrik Negara since 2020.
