= Ministry of Forestry (Indonesia) =

Government ministry of Indonesia

- Kementerian Kehutanan

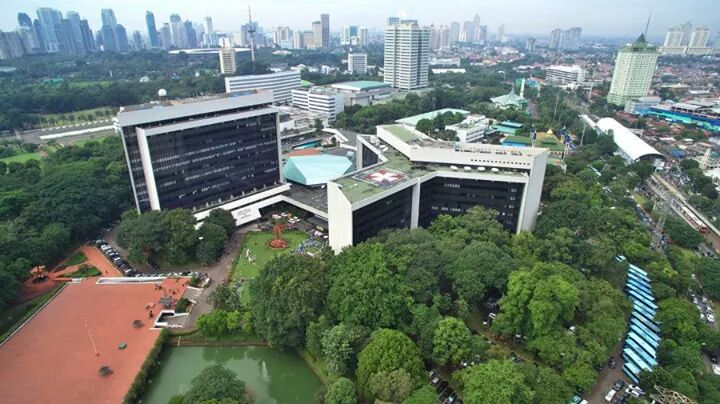
- Ministry of Forestry headquarters, shared with the Ministry of Environment

Ministry overview
- Formed: 1983
- Preceding Ministry: Ministry of Environment and Forestry
- Jurisdiction: Government of Indonesia
- Headquarters: Gedung Manggala Wanabakti Block I 2nd Floor; Jalan Jenderal Gatot Subroto; Jakarta Pusat 10270; Jakarta, Indonesia
- Minister responsible: Raja Juli Antoni, Minister of Forestry
- Deputy Minister responsible: Rohmat Marzuki, Deputy Minister of Forestry
- Parent department: Coordinating Ministry for Food Affairs
- Website: kehutanan.go.id

The Ministry of Forestry (Indonesian: Kementerian Kehutanan) is the cabinet-level, government ministry in the Republic of Indonesia responsible for managing and conserving that nation's forests. The current Minister of Forestry is Raja Juli Antoni.

== History ==
From 1983 to 1998, this institution was called the Department of Forestry, then changed to the Department of Forestry and Plantations for one year. The name Department of Forestry was used again until 2005, then changed to the Ministry of Forestry until 2014. In 2014, the name changed to the Ministry of Environment and Forestry. Since 2024, it has again been named as the Ministry of Forestry. This ministry was formed by Indonesian President Prabowo Subianto in the Red and White Cabinet in October 2024.

== Nomenclature ==
1. General Directorate of Forestry, Department of Agriculture (-1983)
2. Department of Forestry (1983–1998)
3. Department of Forestry and Plantation (1998)
4. Department of Forestry (1998–2010)
5. Ministry of Forestry (2010–2014)
6. Ministry of Environment and Forestry (2014–2024)
7. Ministry of Forestry (2024–present)

== Organizational Structure ==
By Presidential Decree No. 175/2024, and expanded by the Ministry of Forestry Decrees Nos. 1/2024, 3/2025, 4/2025, 5/2025, 6/2025, 7/2025, 8/2025, and 9/2025, the organizational structure of the Ministry consists of:

- Office of the Ministry of Forestry
- Office of the Deputy Ministry of Forestry
- Office of the Secretariat General
  - Bureau of Human Resources and Organization
  - Bureau of Planning
  - Bureau of General Affairs
  - Bureau of Legal Affairs
  - Bureau of Finance
  - Bureau of Public Relations and International Partnership
- Directorate General of Forestry Planology
  - Directorate General of Forestry Planning Secretariat
  - Directorate of Forest Resource Inventory and Monitoring
  - Directorate of Forest Areas Establishment
  - Directorate of Planning, Forest Areas Changes, and Formation of Forest Areas Management
  - Directorate of Forest Use Management
  - Regional Offices of Forestry Planning
    - Regional Office of Forestry Planning Region I, Medan
    - Regional Office of Forestry Planning Region II, Palembang
    - Regional Office of Forestry Planning Region III, Pontianak
    - Regional Office of Forestry Planning Region IV, Samarinda
    - Regional Office of Forestry Planning Region V, Banjarbaru
    - Regional Office of Forestry Planning Region VI, Manado
    - Regional Office of Forestry Planning Region VII, Makassar
    - Regional Office of Forestry Planning Region VIII, Denpasar
    - Regional Office of Forestry Planning Region IX, Ambon
    - Regional Office of Forestry Planning Region X, Jayapura
    - Regional Office of Forestry Planning Region XI, Yogyakarta
    - Regional Office of Forestry Planning Region XII, Tanjung Pinang
    - Regional Office of Forestry Planning Region XIII, Pangkal Pinang
    - Regional Office of Forestry Planning Region XIV, Kupang
    - Regional Office of Forestry Planning Region XV, Gorontalo
    - Regional Office of Forestry Planning Region XVI, Palu
    - Regional Office of Forestry Planning Region XVII, Manokwari
    - Regional Office of Forestry Planning Region XVIII, Banda Aceh
    - Regional Office of Forestry Planning Region XIX, Pekanbaru
    - Regional Office of Forestry Planning Region XX, Bandar Lampung
    - Regional Office of Forestry Planning Region XXI, Palangkaraya
    - Regional Office of Forestry Planning Region XXII, Kendari
- Directorate General of Natural Resources and Ecosystem Conservation
  - Directorate General of Natural Resources and Ecosystem Conservation Secretariat
  - Directorate of Conservation Planning
  - Directorate of Conservation Areas
  - Directorate of Species and Genetic Conservation
  - Directorate of Environmental Services Utilization
  - Directorate of Ecosystem Recovery and Preservation Areas Management
  - National Parks
    - 6 Class A National Park Centers
    - 2 Class B National Park Centers
    - 20 Class A National Park Institutes
    - 20 Class B National Park Institutes
  - Natural Resource Conservation Institutions
    - 3 Class A Natural Resource Conservation Centers
    - 5 Class B Natural Resource Conservation Centers
    - 11 Class A Natural Resource Conservation Institutes
    - 7 Class B Natural Resource Conservation Institutes
- Directorate General Watershed Management and Forest Rehabilitation
  - Directorate General of Watershed Management and Forest Rehabilitation Secretariat
  - Directorate of Watershed Management Planning and Evaluation
  - Directorate of Reforestation and Forest Plants Seeding
  - Directorate of Forest Rehabilitation
  - Directorate of Soil Conservation Engineering and Forest Reclamation
  - Directorate of Mangrove Rehabilitation
  - 34 Watershed Management Institutes
  - 4 Forestry Seed Institutes
- Directorate General of Sustainable Forest Management
  - Directorate General of Sustainable Forest Management Secretariat
  - Directorate of Fostering for Forest Use Plans
  - Directorate of Fostering for Forest Utilization Businesses
  - Directorate of Control for Forest Utilization Businesses
  - Directorate of Fees and Business Administration for Forest Products
  - Directorate of Fostering for Forest Products Processing and Marketing
- Directorate General of Social Forestry
  - Directorate General of Social Forestry Secretariat
  - Directorate of Social Forestry Areas Preparation
  - Directorate of Tenurial Conflict Management and Customary Forestry
  - Directorate of Business Development in Social Forestry Areas
  - Directorate of Social Forestry Control
  - 4 Regional Social Forestry Centers
  - 9 Regional Social Forestry Institutes
- Directorate General of Forestry Law Enforcement
  - Directorate General of Forestry Planning Secretariat
  - Directorate of Prevention and Management of Forestry Reporting
  - Directorate of Forestry Monitoring, Administrative Sanctions, and Civil Law Proceedings
  - Directorate of Forest Law Enforcement
  - Directorate of Forest Fire Control
  - Directorate of Forest Resource Utilization and Forest Security
  - 5 Regional Forestry Law Enforcement Institutes
  - 5 Regional Forest Fire Control Institutes
- Inspectorate General
  - Inspectorate General Secretariat
  - Inspectorate I
  - Inspectorate II
  - Inspectorate III
  - Investigation Inspectorate
- Extension and Human Resource Development Agency
  - Center for Forest Extension
  - Center for Human Resource Development Planning
  - Center for Human Resource Development Education and Training
  - Center for Generation of Forest Conservationists
  - 7 Regional Forest Extension and Human Resource Development Institutes
  - 5 State Vocational Senior High Schools for Forestry
- Centers
  - Center for Data and Information
  - Center for Strategic Studies
  - Center for Sustainable Forest Development
  - Center for Forest Hydrometeorology Disaster Mitigation and Adaptation Development
  - Center for Forest Communities Social and Economy Development
- Board of Experts
  - Senior Expert to the Minister for Forestry Industry Revitalization
  - Senior Expert to the Minister for International Economics and Trade
  - Senior Expert to the Minister for Climate Change
  - Senior Expert to the Minister for Inter-Institutional Relations

== List of ministers of forestry ==
- Soedjarwo (27 July 1964 – 25 July 1966 and 19 March 1983 – 11 March 1988)
- Hasjrul Harahap (21 March 1988 – 16 March 1993)
- Djamaluddin Suryohadikusumo (17 March 1993 – 14 March 1998)
- Sumahadi (14 March 1998 – 21 May 1998)
- Muslimin Nasution (23 May 1998 – 20 October 1999)
- Nur Mahmudi Ismail (29 October 1999 – 15 March 2001)
- Marzuki Usman (15 March 2001 – 23 July 2001)
- Muhammad Prakosa (10 August 2001 – 20 October 2004)
- MS Kaban (21 October 2004 – 20 October 2009)
- Zulkifli Hasan (22 October 2009 – 1 October 2014)
- Raja Juli Antoni (21 October 2024 – present)

== See also ==
- Indonesia Forest Rangers
- Directorate General of Forest Protection and Nature Conservation (Indonesia)
- Government of Indonesia
- Isau-Isau Wildlife Reserve
