= Maruarar Sirait =

Indonesian politician (born 1969)

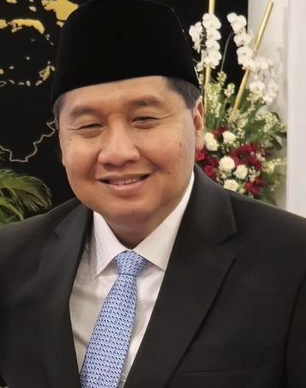

Minister of Housing and Residential Area
- Incumbent
- Assumed office 21 October 2024
- President: Prabowo Subianto
- Preceded by: Basuki Hadimuljono (as Minister of Public Works and Public Housing)

Member of the House of Representatives
- In office 1 October 2004 – 30 September 2019
- Constituency: West Java IX

Personal details
- Born: 23 December 1969 (age 56) Medan, North Sumatra, Indonesia
- Party: Gerindra (since 2024)
- Other political affiliations: PDI-P (1999–2024)
- Parents: Sabam Sirait (father); Sondang br. Sidabutar (mother)
- Education: Parahyangan Catholic University
- Occupation: Politician

Maruarar Sirait (born 23 December 1969) is an Indonesian businessman and politician serving as minister of housing and settlement since 2024. From 2004 to 2019, he was a member of the House of Representatives. With a net worth of over 100 million US Dollars, he is one of the wealthiest ministers in Indonesia. He is also the son of Sabam Sirait.
