= Widiyanti Putri =

Indonesian politician (born 1970)

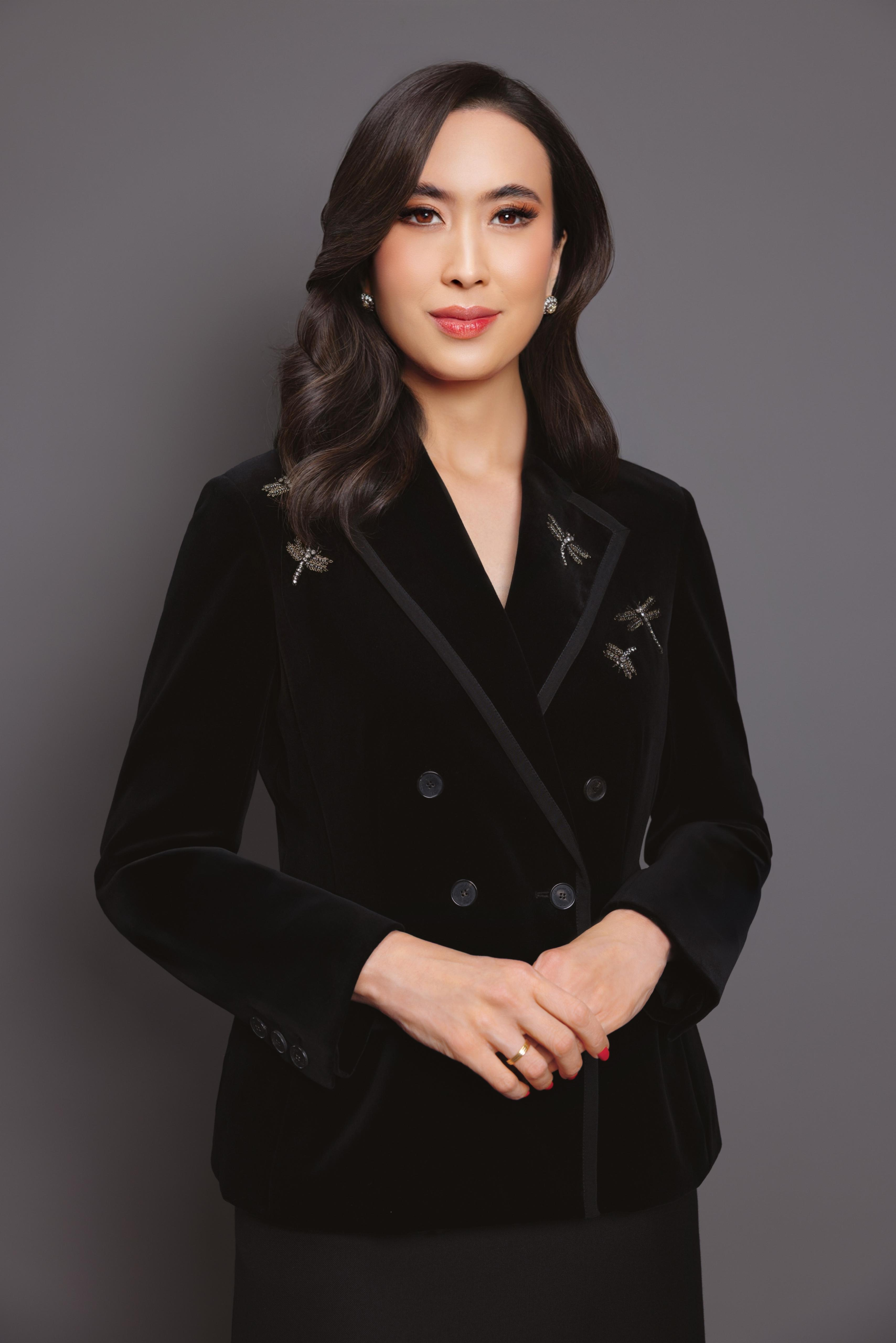
- Minister of Tourism of the Republic of Indonesia 2024-2029

12th Minister of Tourism
- Incumbent
- Assumed office 21 October 2024
- President: Prabowo Subianto
- Deputy: Ni Luh Puspa
- Preceded by: Sandiaga Uno (as Minister of Tourism and Creative Economy)

Personal details
- Born: 1970 (age 55–56) Singapore
- Party: Independent
- Spouse: Wishnu Wardhana
- Education: Pepperdine University

Widiyanti Putri Wardhana (born 1970) is an Indonesian politician serving as minister of tourism since 2024. From 2018 to 2024, she served as secretary general of the Indonesian Heart Foundation.
