= List of central government agencies in Indonesia =

This is a list of central government agencies in Indonesia.

== State institutions ==
According to the current Constitution, state institutions (Indonesian: Lembaga Negara) of Indonesia are as follow:

Division of Powers	Institutions (in English)	Institutions (in Indonesian)	Roles
Executive	President and Vice President	Presiden dan Wakil Presiden	Heads of government
Legislative	People's Consultative Assembly	Majelis Permusyawaratan Rakyat	Bicameral national legislature
Legislative	House of Representatives	Dewan Perwakilan Rakyat	Lower house of the legislature
Legislative	Regional Representative Council	Dewan Perwakilan Daerah	Upper house of the legislature
Judicial	Supreme Court	Mahkamah Agung	Highest court of the land
Judicial	Constitutional Court	Mahkamah Konstitusi	Constitutional review of a law, among others
Judicial	Judicial Commission	Komisi Yudisial	Maintaining the independence and welfare of the judges
Examinative	Audit Board	Badan Pemeriksa Keuangan	Examine the state finance accountability

== Central government institutions ==
=== Ministries ===
The current Cabinet, formed on 21 October 2024, comprises the following 48 ministers:

==== Coordinating Ministries ====
Coordinating ministries are tasked mainly to coordinate the various government ministries and other government institutions.

- Coordinating Minister for Political and Security Affairs
- Coordinating Minister for Legal, Human Rights, Immigration, and Correction
- Coordinating Minister for Economic Affairs
- Coordinating Minister for Infrastructure and Regional Development
- Coordinating Minister for Human Development and Cultural Affairs
- Coordinating Minister for Social Empowerment
- Coordinating Minister for Food Affairs

==== Ministries ====
- Ministry of Agrarian Affairs and Spatial Planning / National Land Agency
- Ministry of Agriculture
- Ministry of Cultural Affairs
- Ministry of Communication and Digital Affairs
- Ministry of Cooperatives
- Ministry of Creative Economy / Creative Economy Agency
- Ministry of Defense
- Minister of Energy and Mineral Resources
- Ministry of Environment / Environment Control Board
- Minister of Finance
- Ministry of Foreign Affairs
- Ministry of Forestry
- Ministry of Hajj and Umrah
- Ministry of Higher Education, Science, and Technology
- Ministry of Human Rights
- Ministry of Health
- Ministry of Home Affairs
- Ministry of Housing and Residential Area
- Ministry of Immigration and Correction
- Ministry of Indonesian Migrant Workers Protection / Indonesian Migrant Workers Protection Board
- Ministry of Industry
- Ministry of Investment and Downstream Industry / Investment Coordinating Board
- Ministry of Law
- Ministry of Manpower
- Ministry of Marine Affairs and Fisheries
- Ministry of Micro, Small, and Medium Enterprises
- Ministry of National Development Planning / National Development Planning Agency
- Ministry of Public Works
- Ministry of Population and Family Development / National Population and Family Planning Board
- Ministry of Primary and Secondary Education
- Ministry of Religious Affairs
- Ministry of Social Affairs
- Ministry of State Secretariat
- Ministry of State Apparatus Utilization and Bureaucratic Reform
- Ministry of Tourism
- Ministry of Trade
- Ministry of Transportation
- Ministry of Transmigration
- Ministry of Villages and Development of Disadvantaged Regions
- Ministry of Women Empowerment and Child Protection
- Ministry of Youth and Sports

=== Non-ministerial government institutions ===
The following outlines non-ministerial government institutions:

==== Law and security ====
- Attorney General's Office (Kejagung)
- Maritime Security Agency (Bakamla)
- National Agency for Disaster Countermeasure (BNPB)
- National Armed Forces (TNI)
- National Counter Terrorism Agency (BNPT)
- National Cyber and Crypto Agency (BSSN)
- National Land Agency (BPN)
- National Narcotics Board (BNN)
- National Police (Polri)
- National Resilience Institute (Lemhannas)
- National Search and Rescue Agency (Basarnas)
- State Intelligence Agency (BIN)
- Quarantine Agency (Barantin)

==== Finance ====
- Bank Indonesia (BI)
- Finance and Development Supervisory Agency (BPKP)
- National Public Procurement Agency (LKPP)
- Investment Coordinating Board (BKPM)

==== Population ====
- Migrant Workers Protection Board (BP2MI)
- National Population and Family Planning Board (BKKBN)
- Statistics Indonesia (BPS)

==== Science and culture ====
- Creative Economy Agency (BEKRAF)
- Environment Control Board (BPLH)
- Food and Drug Authority (BPOM)
- Halal Product Assurance Organizing Agency (BPJPH)
- Geospatial Information Agency (BIG)
- Meteorology, Climatology, and Geophysical Agency (BMKG)
- National Archives of Indonesia (ANRI)
- National Development Planning Agency (Bappenas)
- National Food Agency (Bapanas)
- National Library of Indonesia (Perpusnas)
- National Nutrition Agency (BGN)
- National Research and Innovation Agency (BRIN)
- National Standardization Agency (BSN)
- Nuclear Energy Regulatory Agency (BAPETEN)

==== Bureaucracy ====
- National Administration Institute (LAN)
- National Civil Service Agency (BKN)
- State-Owned Enterprises Regulatory Agency (BP BUMN)

=== Non-structural government institutions ===
The following lists unstructured institutions:

- Academy of Sciences (AIPI)
- Acceleration of Housing Enforcement (BP3)
- Acceleration of Infrastructure Provision Policy Committee (KPPIP)
- Acceleration of Poverty Reduction Agency (BP Taskin)
- Agency for Development Control and Special Investigation (Bappisus)
- Anti Dumping Committee (KADI)
- Attorney Commission (Komjak)
- Batam Free Trade Zone and Free Port Management Agency (BP Batam)
- Batam Free Trade Zone and Free Port Council (DK Batam)
- Bintan Free Trade Zone and Free Port Management Agency (BP Bintan)
- Bintan Free Trade Zone and Free Port Council (DK Bintan)
- Borobudur Authority Agency (BOB)
- Broadcasting Commission (KPI)
- Business Competition Supervisory Commission (KPPU)
- Central Information Commission (KIP)
- Child Protection Commission (KPAI)
- Civil Service Advisory Agency (BAPEK)
- Commission on Biological Safety of Genetically Engineered Products (KKH PRG)
- Commission on Acceleration of Police Reform
- Company Privatization Committee
- Cooperatives Council (DEKOPIN)
- Corruption Eradication Commission (KPK)
- Council of Engineers (DII)
- Council of Health Workers (KTKI)
- Counterfeited Rupiah Eradication Coordinating Board (Botasupal)
- Defense Industry Policy Committee (KKIP)
- Deposit Insurance Agency (LPS)
- Executive Office of the President (KSP)
- Film Agency (BPI)
- Film Censorship Institute (LSF)
- Financing Policy Committee for Micro, Small and Medium Enterprises
- Financial Services Authority (OJK)
- Financial Transaction Reports and Analysis Centre (PPATK)
- General Elections Commission (KPU)
- General Elections Organiser Ethics Council (DKPP)
- General Elections Supervisory Agency (Bawaslu)
- Government Accounting Standards Committee (KSAP)
- Government Communications Agency (Bakom)
- Hajj Financial Management Agency (BPKH)
- Health Workers Disciplinary Board (MDTK)
- Hospital Oversight Agency (BPRS)
- Institute for the Environmental Feasibility Test (LUKLH)
- Institute for the Prevention and Eradication of Forest Damage (LP3H)
- Istiqlal Mosque Management Executive Board (BPMI)
- Karimun Free Trade Zone and Free Port Management Agency (BP Karimun)
- Karimun Free Trade Zone and Free Port Council (DK Karimun)
- Labuan Bajo Flores Tourism Authority Agency (BPOLBF)
- Lake Toba Authority Agency (BPODT)
- Land Bank Authority (BT)
- Medical Counci (KKI)
- Mineral Industry Authority (BIM)
- National Accreditation Committee (KAN)
- National Amil Zakat Agency (BAZNAS)
- National Aviation Security Committee
- National Border Management Agency (BNPP)
- National Chemical Weapons Authority (OTNAS)
- National Commission on Violence against Women (Komnas Perempuan)
- National Commission on Human Rights (Komnas HAM)
- National Committee on Sharia Economics and Finance (KNEKS)
- National Consumer Protection Agency (BPKN)
- National Council for Inclusive Finance (DNKI)
- National Council for Special Economic Zones
- National Defense Council (DPN)
- National Disability Commission (KND)
- National Economics Council (DEN)
- National Energy Council (DEN)
- National Film Advisory Agency (BP2N)
- National Health Advisory Agency
- National Industry Committee (KINAS)
- National Information and Communication Technology Council (Wantiknas)
- National Police Commission (Kompolnas)
- National Productivity Institute (LPN)
- National Professional Certification Board (BNSP)
- National Social Security Board (DJSN)
- National Sports Committee of Indonesia (KONI)
- National Transportation Safety Committee (KNKT)
- National Wages Council (Depenas)
- National Water Resources Council (DSDAN)
- North Java Coast Management Authority (BOPPJ)
- Nuclear Energy Advisory Council (MPTN)
- Nusantara Capital City Authority (OIKN)
- Oil and Gas Downstream Regulatory Agency (BPH Migas)
- Olympic Committee (KOI)
- Ombudsman of the Republic of Indonesia (ORI)
- Pancasila Ideology Development Agency (BPIP)
- Patent Appeal Commission
- Peace Maintenance Mission Coordination Team (TKMPP)
- Peat and Mangrove Restoration Agency (BRGM)
- Personal Data Protection Authority Institute
- Plantation Fund Management Agency (BPDP)
- Presidential Advisory Council (Wantimpres)
- Press Council
- Public Accountants Professional Committee (KPAP)
- Public Housing Savings Committee
- Public Housing Savings Management Agency (BP Tapera)
- Radio of the Republic of Indonesia (RRI)
- Regional Autonomy Advisory Council (DPOD)
- Regional Border Management Agency (BPPD)
- Sabang Free Trade Zone and Free Port Management Agency (BPKS)
- Sabang Free Trade Zone and Free Port Council (DKS)
- Social Security Agency on Health
- Social Security Agency on Employment
- Special Task Force for Upstream Oil and Gas Business Activities (SKK Migas)
- State Civil Service Commission (KASN)
- State Civil Service Advisory Board (BP ASN)
- Steering Committee for the Acceleration of Papua Autonomy Development (BPP)
- Television of the Republic of Indonesia (TVRI)
- Titles, Decorations and Honours Council
- Tourism Promotion Board (BPPI)
- Trade Security Committee (KPPI)
- Trademark Appeal Commission
- Tripartite Cooperation Institute (LKS Tripartit)
- Waqf Agency (BWI)
- Witness and Victim Protection Agency (LPSK)

== Cabinet-level agencies ==
Cabinet-level agencies are state and government institutions formed by the Constitutions and its subordinating laws whose roles and responsibilities are to support all government priorities and strategies set by the President. Each agency is headed by a ministerial-rank official who is not a member of the Cabinet but attends Cabinet meetings regularly. Cabinet-level agencies are:

- Attorney General's Office, represented in the cabinet by the Attorney General.
- Executive Office of the President, represented in the cabinet by the Chief of Presidential Staff.
- Government Communications Agency, represented in the cabinet by the Head of Government Communications Agency.
- National Armed Forces, represented in the cabinet by the Commander of the National Armed Forces.
- National Police, represented in the cabinet by the Chief of the National Police.
- State Intelligence Agency, represented in the cabinet by the Head of State Intelligence Agency.
- National Economics Council, represented in the cabinet by the Chairman of National Economics Council.
- National Cyber and Crypto Agency, represented in the cabinet by the Chief of National Cyber and Crypto Agency.
- Finance and Development Supervisory Agency, represented in the cabinet by the Chief of Finance and Development Supervisory Agency.
- Statistics Indonesia, represented in the cabinet by the Chief of Central Agency of Statistics.
