= Non-structural institution =

Non-structural institutions (Indonesian: Lembaga Nonstruktural; LNS) or non-structural agencies are special organizations in Indonesia distinct from traditional government ministries and non-ministerial government bodies. Formed through certain legislative and executive acts, (e.g. laws, government regulation, presidential regulation) non-structural institutions are formed to support the overall functions of the state and government, addressing specific needs/tasks that cannot be as efficiently handled by existing ministries and agencies. Funding for these organizations come from the national budget (APBN).

== Classification ==
Non-structural institutions can be classified based on how they were established, their sources of funding, and whether they have regional representation or not. The types are as follows:

1. Legal Basis of Formation:

- Laws (Undang-Undang): Formed directly through legislation passed by the Indonesian Parliament
- Government Regulations (Peraturan Pemerintah): Established by regulations issued by the government
- Presidential Regulations (Peraturan Presiden): Created through regulations issued by the President of Indonesia
- Presidential Decrees (Keputusan Presiden): Created through decrees issued by the President of Indonesia

2. Funding:

- Independent budget (DIPA): Funded through their own distinct budget allocations
- Ministry/Agency attached budget (DIPA): Funded through the budgets of their associated government ministry or agency
- Regional budget (APBD): Funded through the nation's regional budgets
- Other funding sources

3. Regional Representation:

- Institutions which primarily operate at the national level, thus having no regional offices
- Institutions which have regional offices

== List ==
Non-structural Institutions
Logo	Institution Name	Acronym	Legal Basis
	Academy of Sciences; Akademi Ilmu Pengetahuan Indonesia	AIPI	Law No. 8 of 1990
	National Amil Zakat Agency; Badan Amil Zakat Nasional	BAZNAS	Law No. 23 of 2011, Government Regulation No. 14 of 2014
	Counterfeited Rupiah Eradication Coordinating Board; Badan Koordinasi Pemberantasan Rupiah Palsu	Botasupal	Presidential Regulation No. 123 of 2012
	National Border Management Agency; Badan Nasional Pengelola Perbatasan	BNPP	Presidential Regulation No. 44 of 2017
	National Professional Certification Agency; Badan Nasional Sertifikasi Profesi	BNSP	Job Creation Law/Law No. 6 of 2023, Government Regulation No. 10 of 2018
	Istiqlal Mosque Management Executive Board; Badan Pelaksana Pengelola Masjid Istiqlal	BPMI	Presidential Regulation No. 64 of 2019, Presidential Regulation No. 46 of 2023
	Oil and Gas Downstream Regulatory Agency; Badan Pengatur Hilir Minyak dan Gas Bumi	BPH Migas	Government Regulation No. 67 of 2002, Government Regulation No. 49 of 2012, Presidential Decree No. 86 of 2002, Presidential Regulation No. 45 of 2012
	General Election Supervisory Agency; Badan Pengawas Pemilihan Umum	Bawaslu	Law No. 15 of 2011
	Hajj Financial Management Agency; Badan Pengelola Keuangan Haji	BPKH	Law No. 34 of 2014
	Public Housing Savings Management Agency; Badan Pengelola Tabungan Perumahan Rakyat	BP Tapera	Law No. 1 of 2011, Law No. 4 of 2016, Government Regulation No. 25 of 2020
	Social Security Agency on Health; Badan Penyelenggara Jaminan Sosial Kesehatan	BPJS Kesehatan	Law No. 40 of 2004, Law No. 24 of 2011, Law No. 6 of 2023, Law No. 4 of 2023
	Social Security Agency on Employment; Badan Penyelenggara Jaminan Sosial Ketenagakerjaan	BPJS Ketenagakerjaan	Law No. 40 of 2004, Law No. 24 of 2011, Law No. 6 of 2023, Law No. 4 of 2023
	Indonesian Film Board; Badan Perfilman Indonesia	BPI	Law No. 33 of 2009, Law No. 6 of 2023
	Lake Toba Authority Implementing Agency; Badan Otorita Pariwisata Danau Toba	BPODT	Presidential Regulation No. 49 of 2016
	Borobudur Authority Agency; Badan Otorita Pariwisata Borobudur	BOB	Presidential Regulation No. 46 of 2017
	Labuan Bajo Flores Tourism Authority Agency	BPOLBF	Presidential Regulation No. 32 of 2018
	Batam Free Trade Zone and Free Port Management Agency; Badan Pengusahaan Kawasan Perdagangan Bebas dan Pelabuhan Bebas Batam	BP Batam	Government Regulation No. 46 of 2007, Government Regulation No. 5 of 2011, Government Regulation No. 62 of 2019, Government Regulation No. 68 of 2021
	Bintan Free Trade Zone and Free Port Management Agency; Badan Pengusahaan Kawasan Perdagangan Bebas dan Pelabuhan Bebas Bintan	BP Bintan	Government Regulation No. 47 of 2007, Government Regulation No. 41 of 2017
	Karimun Free Trade Zone and Free Port Management Agency; Badan Pengusahaan Kawasan Perdagangan Bebas dan Pelabuhan Bebas Karimun	BP Karimun	Government Regulation No. 48 of 2007, Government Regulation No. 40 of 2017
	Sabang Free Trade Area and Free Port Authority; Badan Pengusahaan Kawasan Perdagangan Bebas dan Pelabuhan Bebas Sabang	BPKS	Law No. 37 of 2000, Law No. 6 of 2023
	National Consumer Protection Agency; Badan Perlindungan Konsumen Nasional	BPKN	Government Regulation No. 4 of 2019
	State Civil Service Advisory Board; Badan Pertimbangan Aparatur Sipil Negara	BP ASN	Government Regulation No. 79 of 2021, Law No. 20 of 2023
	National Health Advisory Agency; Badan Pertimbangan Kesehatan Nasional		Presidential Decree No. 12 of 1994
	Waqf Agency	BWI	Law No. 41 of 2004, Government Regulation No. 25 of 2018
	National Energy Council	DEN	Law No. 30 of 2007, Presidential Regulation No. 26 of 2008
	Titles, Decorations and Honours Council		Law No. 20 of 2009, Government Regulation No. 1 of 2010
	National Social Security Board	DJSN	Law No. 40 of 2004, Law No. 6 of 2023
	Press Council		Law No. 40 of 1999
	Anti Dumping Committee	KADI	Government Regulation No. 34 of 2011
	Child Protection Commission	KPAI	Law No. 23 of 2002, Law No. 1 of 2023
	Broadcasting Commission	KPI	Law No. 32 of 2002, Law No. 6 of 2023
	National Disability Commission	KND	Presidential Regulation No. 68 of 2020
	Deposit Insurance Agency	LPS	Law No. 24 of 2004, Law No. 7 of 2009, Law No. 4 of 2023
Logo LPSK	Witness and Victim Protection Agency	LPSK	Law No. 13 of 2006, Law No. 31 of 2014
	National Police Commission	Kompolnas	Presidential Regulation No. 17 of 2011
	National Commission on Human Rights	Komnas HAM	Law No. 50 of 1993
	Financial Services Authority	OJK	Law No. 21 of 2011, Government Regulation No. 4 of 2023
	National Information and Communication Technology Council	Wantiknas	Presidential Decree No. 1 of 2014
	Executive Office of the President	KSP	Presidential Regulation No. 83 of 2019
	Presidential Advisory Council	Wantimpres	Law No. 19 of 2006
	National Commission on Violence against Women	Komnas Perempuan	Presidential Regulation No. 65 of 2005
	Corruption Eradication Commission	KPK	Law No. 30 of 2002, Law No. 10 of 2015, Law No. 19 of 2019
	General Elections Commission	KPU	Law No. 7 of 2017, Law No. 7 of 2023
	National Transportation Safety Committee	KNKT	Presidential Regulation No. 102 of 2002
	National Sports Committee of Indonesia	KONI	Government Regulation No. 16 of 2007, Law No. 11 of 2022
	Olympic Committee; Komite Olimpiade Indonesia	KOI	Law No. 11 of 2022, Government Regulation No. 16 of 2007
	Trade Security Committee of Indonesia; Komite Pengamanan Perdagangan Indonesia	KPPI	Government Regulation No. 34 of 2011
	Tax Oversight Committee; Komite Pengawas Perpajakan	Komwasjak	Law No. 28 of 2007, Law No. 7 of 2021
	Committee for the Acceleration of Priority Infrastructure Provision; Komite Percepatan Penyediaan Infrastruktur Prioritas	KPPIP	President Regulation No. 75 of 2014, President Regulation No. 122 of 2016
pus	Company Privatization Committee; Komite Privatisasi Perusahaan Perseroan	KP Persero	Government Regulation No. 33 of 2005, President Decreee No. 47 of 2014, President Decreee No. 2 of 2021
	Public Accounting Profession Committee; Komite Profesi Akuntan Publik	KPAP	Government Regulation No. 84 of 2012
	Government Accounting Standards Committee; Komite Standar Akuntansi Pemerintahan	KSAP	President Decree No 28 of 2017
	Financial System Stability Committee; Komite Stabilitas Sistem Keuangan	KSSK	Law No. 9 of 2016, Law No. 4 of 2023
	Public Housing Savings Committee; Komite Tabungan Perumahan Rakyat	Komite Tapera	Law No. 1 of 2011, Law No. 4 of 2016, Government Regulation No. 25 of 2020
	Health Council of Indonesia; Konsil Kesehatan Indonesia	KKI	Law No. 17 of 2023
	Tripartite Cooperation Institution; Lembaga Kerja Sama Tripartit	LKS Tripartit	Government Regulation No. 4 of 2017
	Forest Destruction Prevention and Eradication Agency; Lembaga Pencegahan dan Pemberantasan Perusakan Hutan	LP3H	Law No. 18 of 2013, Law No. 6 of 2023
	Indonesia Investment Authority; Lembaga Pengelola Investasi	INA	Law No. 6 of 2023
pus	Public Broadcasting Institution; Television of the Republic of Indonesia; Lembaga Penyiaran Publik Televisi Republik Indonesia	LPP TVRI	Law No. 32 of 2002, Government Regulation No. 13 of 2005
	Public Broadcasting Institution; Radio of the Republic of Indonesia; Lembaga Penyiaran Radio Republik Indonesia	LPP RRI	Law No. 32 of 2002, Government Regulation No. 12 of 2005
	Witness and Victim Protection Agency; Lembaga Perlindungan Saksi dan Korban	LPSK	Law No. 13 of 2006, Law No. 1 of 2023
	National Productivity Institute; Lembaga Produktivitas Nasional	LPN	President Regulation No. 1 Tahun 2023
	Film Censorship Board; Lembaga Sensor Film	LSF	Law No. 33 of 2009, Government Regulation No. 18 of 2014, Law No. 6 of 2023
	Green Industry Certification Institute; Lembaga Sertifikasi Industri Hijau	LSIH	Government Regulation No. 14 of 2015
	Environmental Feasibility Testing Institute; Lembaga Uji Kelayakan Lingkungan Hidup	LUKLH	Government Regulation No.22 of 2021
	Nuclear Energy Advisory Council; Majelis Pertimbangan Tenaga Nuklir	MPTN	Law No. 10 of 1997, President Regulation No. 83 of 2014, Law No. 6 of 2023
	Nusantara Capital City Authority	OIKN	Law No. 3 of 2022
pus	Ombudsman of the Republic of Indonesia; Ombudsman Republik Indonesia	ORI	Law No.37 of 2008
	Financial Transaction Reports and Analysis Centre; Pusat Pelaporan dan Analisis Transaksi Keuangan	PPATK	Law No. 8 of 2010, Law No. 1 of 2023
