= 2025 Jakarta Fairmont Hotel occupation =

Protest in Indonesia

Protest Against the Revision of the TNI Law at Fairmont Jakarta 2025
- Part of 2025 Indonesian protests
- Members of the KontraS activist group being escorted after the occupation protest
- Date: March 14–15, 2025
- Time: 15:00–18.00 (15 March) (UTC+7)
- Location: Jakarta Fairmont Hotel, Jakarta, Indonesia; 6.222009°S 106.798946°E
- Type: Occupation protest
- Cause: See #Claims
- Participants: Civil Society Coalition for Security Sector Reform
- Outcome: Occupation suppressed

On 15 March 2025, the Civil Society Coalition for Security Sector Reform held a protest at the Fairmont Hotel in Central Jakarta, targeting a closed-door meeting of the Working Committee on the Revision of the TNI Law attended by members of the Indonesian House of Representatives and government representatives. The meeting was part of ongoing efforts to revise Law Number 34 of 2004 on the Indonesian National Armed Forces (TNI), with proposed amendments sparking controversy—such as the placement of active-duty soldiers in civilian posts and an increase in the retirement age.

The protest involved three activists who entered the meeting room, unfurled critical posters, and voiced objections, demanding that the meeting be halted due to its closed-door nature. They were removed by security personnel and reported to the police, who are now conducting an investigation. The House of Representatives defended the meeting's location, calling it a common practice, without addressing the substance of the criticism.

== Background ==
From March 14 to 15, 2025, Commission I of the Indonesian House of Representatives (DPR RI), together with government representatives, held a Working Committee (Panja) meeting to discuss revisions to Law Number 34 of 2004 on the Indonesian National Armed Forces (TNI). The meeting was conducted behind closed doors at the Fairmont Hotel, a five-star hotel located in the Senayan area of Central Jakarta. The choice of venue outside the DPR building and the closed nature of the meeting drew criticism from various quarters, particularly the Civil Society Coalition for Security Sector Reform, which includes organizations such as KontraS, Imparsial, YLBHI, Amnesty International Indonesia, ELSAM, SETARA Institute, among others.

The revision of the TNI Law has drawn public attention due to concerns that it contains articles potentially reviving the military's dual function (dwifungsi)—a New Order-era practice in which the armed forces held both security and civilian political roles. The coalition argued that the revision process lacks transparency, accountability, and public participation, and runs counter to the spirit of the 1998 reform movement, which emphasized military professionalism and civilian supremacy.

=== Substantive context of the revision ===
Law Number 34 of 2004 concerning the Indonesian National Army.

The revision of the TNI Law under discussion includes increasing the number of civilian positions that may be held by active-duty soldiers—from the current 10 agencies (as stated in Article 47, Paragraph 2 of the existing TNI Law) to a broader range; expanding Military Operations Other Than War (OMSP) duties, such as involvement in narcotics enforcement, which is viewed as excessive since it should fall under civilian law enforcement; and altering the retirement age for military personnel.

The coalition considers this revision to be not urgent and actually contradicts the need to modernize defense equipment and improve soldier welfare.

== Claims ==
The Civil Society Coalition for Security Sector Reform has raised several objections to both the substance and the process of the TNI Law revision. The closed-door meeting held in a luxury hotel was seen as a sign of the DPR and government's weak commitment to transparency and public participation in legislation that significantly affects the governance of national defense.

In addition, the revision of the TNI Law, based on the List of Problems (Daftar Inventarisasi Masalah) submitted by the government on 11 March 2025, is considered to contain problematic provisions, such as the expansion of active-duty TNI placements in civilian positions and the broadening of Military Operations Other Than War (OMSP) duties (e.g., narcotics handling). These provisions are seen as risking a return to the TNI's dual function, undermining military professionalism, and threatening democracy and human rights. The choice of Hotel Fairmont as the venue and the timing of the meetings on a weekend during the DPR's recess (which runs until 21 March 2025) are viewed as deliberate attempts to evade public scrutiny.

The coalition emphasized that the revision contradicts the spirit of reform, which calls for a clear separation between military and civilian roles. Dimas Bagus Arya, coordinator of KontraS, stated that the problematic articles in the TNI Bill could lead to the exclusion of civilians from civilian positions, military dominance in the civilian sphere, and dual loyalties among TNI personnel.

== Chronology ==
=== Working Committee meeting begins ===
On 14 March 2025, the Working Committee (Panja) meeting began at 1:00 PM Western Indonesia Time (WIB) at the Jakarta Fairmont Hotel. It involved Commission I of the House of Representatives (DPR RI) and government representatives from various ministries, including the Ministry of Defense (Kemenhan), the Ministry of Law and Human Rights (Kemenkumham), the Ministry of Finance (Kemenkeu), and the Ministry of State Secretariat (Kemensesneg).

TB Hasanuddin, a member of Commission I of the DPR from the Indonesian Democratic Party of Struggle (PDI-P) faction, confirmed that the meeting discussed the List of Problems Inventory (DIM) for the revision of the Indonesian National Armed Forces (TNI) Law. As of the evening, the meeting was still ongoing and was scheduled to conclude at 10:00 PM WIB.

=== Civil Society Coalition raid ===
At 5:49 PM WIB, three representatives from the Civil Society Coalition for Security Sector Reform arrived at the Fairmont Hotel. They included Andrie Yunus, Deputy Coordinator of KontraS, along with two other activists. The trio carried A4-sized posters containing critical messages about the revision of the TNI Law, one of which featured an image of the Army Chief of Staff (KSAD), Maruli Simanjuntak.

One minute later, at exactly 5:50 PM WIB, the three activists burst into the meeting room, on the second floor of the Jakarta Fairmont Hotel, Ruby Rooms 1 and 2, where the Working Committee (Panja) was holding its discussion. Inside the room, Andrie Yunus unfurled a poster and delivered a speech: “Good afternoon, ladies and gentlemen. We are from the Security Sector Reform Coalition, observers in the field of defense. We demand that the deliberation process for the revision of the TNI Law be stopped, as it does not follow proper legislative procedures. This is being held behind closed doors!”

At 5:52 PM WIB, hotel security personnel, along with several staff members dressed in batik, quickly escorted the activists out. During the removal, Andrie was pushed and fell to the ground, shouting, “Woi, you pushed! How can we be treated so repressively like this?” Following the incident, the meeting room doors were closed and secured.

At 5:55 PM WIB, the three activists continued their protest outside the room, right in front of the now-locked doors. They delivered loud speeches rejecting the revision of the TNI Law. Some of the statements voiced included: “We are exercising our oversight role as civil society. We reject the ongoing discussion inside! We reject the dual function of the armed forces! Return the military to the barracks!”

Finally, at 6:00 PM WIB, hotel security personnel asked the activists to leave the premises. The request was complied with, and the activists exited the Fairmont Hotel after delivering their message.

=== Fairmont security guards report KontraS activists ===
On 16 March 2025, the protest action was reported to the Jakarta Metropolitan Police (Polda Metro Jaya) by a Fairmont Hotel security guard named RYR. The report was registered under number LP/B/1876/III/2025/SPKT/POLDA METRO JAYA. The allegations include suspected disruption of public order, coercion with threats of violence, and insult against a legal entity, based on Articles 172, 212, 217, 335, 503, and 207 of the Indonesian Criminal Code (KUHP). The individuals involved remain under investigation.

In the early hours of the same Sunday, the Jakarta office of KontraS was visited by three unidentified men who rang the doorbell for five minutes and claimed to be from the media. At the same time, Andrie Yunus received three phone calls from unknown numbers. KontraS suspects that this was an act of intimidation following their protest at the Fairmont Hotel.

=== Allegations of intimidation of activists ===
Following the protest against the deliberation of the TNI Bill by KontraS, Andrie Yunus, Deputy Coordinator for External Affairs at KontraS, reported experiencing several forms of alleged intimidation.

According to his statement, Andrie received several phone calls from unknown numbers following the incident in which the Working Committee meeting on the TNI Bill was disrupted at the Fairmont Hotel in Jakarta. After conducting an internal investigation, KontraS Coordinator Dimas Bagus Arya claimed that one of the numbers was suspected to belong to a personnel member of the Army Intelligence Detachment (Denintel TNI AD).

In addition, during the early hours of Sunday, the central office of KontraS in Jakarta was visited by three unidentified individuals. According to CCTV footage captured at the front of the office, the three individuals claimed to be media representatives. However, they did not provide any information regarding their identities, the media outlet they represented, or the purpose of their visit at such an unusual hour.

Andrie Yunus told Narasi that the incident was highly suspicious and is suspected to be directly linked to the protest carried out by KontraS against the closed-door deliberations of the TNI Bill on Saturday evening.

== Impact ==
The action by the Civil Society Coalition on March 15, 2025, at the Fairmont Hotel marked the peak of protests against the revision process of the TNI Law, which was deemed to reintroduce the dual-function concept, revive militarism, and undermine democratic principles.

== Response ==
=== Government and DPR RI ===
Chairman of Commission I of the Indonesian House of Representatives (DPR RI), Utut Adianto, defended the choice of Jakarta's Fairmont Hotel as the venue for the TNI Bill deliberation meeting. He stated that holding meetings in hotels is not a new practice and has long been a common occurrence. As an example, he cited the deliberation of the Prosecutor's Law, which took place at the Sheraton Hotel, and the discussion of the Personal Data Protection Law, held at the InterContinental Hotel. Responding to criticism regarding budget efficiency, Utut declined to provide further explanation and simply replied, “That's just your opinion.”

Meanwhile, Commission I member from the Indonesian Democratic Party of Struggle (PDI-P) faction, TB Hasanuddin, stated that as of Saturday afternoon, around 40% of the 92 points in the List of Problems (DIM) for the TNI Bill had been discussed. The deliberations focused on issues related to the retirement age limits for TNI personnel. However, when asked about the urgency of holding the meeting outside the DPR complex, Hasanuddin redirected the question to the DPR leadership.

Secretary General of the Indonesian House of Representatives (DPR RI), Indra Iskandar, explained that holding the meeting at a luxury hotel was in accordance with Article 254 of the DPR's Rules of Procedure, which allows urgent meetings to be conducted outside the DPR building with the approval of the leadership. He stated that the Jakarta Fairmont Hotel was chosen because it met the DPR's Input Cost Standards (SBM) and was deemed suitable for supporting marathon-style meetings.

== See also ==
- August 2025 Indonesian protests
