= Non-ministerial government body of Indonesia =

Government agencies of Indonesia

Non-ministerial government body (Indonesian: Lembaga Pemerintah Nonkementerian, LPNK), was known as non-departmental government body (Lembaga Pemerintah Nondepartemen, LPND), is the Indonesian state body for specific government task from the President. Chief of LPNK is directly responsible to the President or relevant minister.

== Bodies ==
Logo	Name	Chief	Coordinator
	National Archives of Indonesia	Mego Pinandito	Minister of State Apparatus Utilization and Bureaucratic Reform
	Creative Economy Agency	Teuku Riefky Harsya	Minister of Creative Economy
	National Nutrition Agency	Sudaryono	President
	Geospatial Information Agency	Mohamad Arief Syafi'i	Minister of National Development Planning
	State Intelligence Agency	Muhammad Herindra	President
	Indonesian Quarantine Agency	Abdul Kadir Karding	President
	Indonesian Maritime Security Agency	Irvansyah	Coordinating Minister for Political and Security Affairs
	National Civil Service Agency	Zudan Arif Fakrulloh	Minister of State Apparatus Utilization and Bureaucratic Reform
	National Population and Family Planning Board	Wihaji	Minister of Population and Family Development
	Investment Coordinating Board	Rosan Roeslani	Minister of Investment and Downstreaming Policy
	Environment Control Board	Jumhur Hidayat	Minister of Environment
	Halal Product Assurance Organizing Agency	Haikal Hassan	Minister of Religious Affairs
	Meteorology, Climatology, and Geophysical Agency	Teuku Faisal Fathani	President
	National Narcotics Board		President
	National Agency for Disaster Countermeasure	Kristomei Sianturi	President
	National Counter Terrorism Agency	Eddy Hartono	Coordinating Minister for Political and Security Affairs
	National Food Agency	Amran Sulaiman	President
	Indonesian Migrant Workers Protection Agency	Mukhtarudin	Minister of Indonesian Migrant Workers Protection
	Finance and Development Supervisory Agency	Muhammad Yusuf Ateh	President
	Nuclear Energy Regulatory Agency	Zainal Arifin	Head of National Research and Innovation Agency
	State-Owned Enterprises Regulatory Agency	Dony Oskaria	President
	Indonesian Food and Drug Authority	Taruna Ikrar	Minister of Health
	National Development Planning Agency	Rachmat Pambudy	Minister of National Development Planning
	National Land Agency	Nusron Wahid	Minister of Agrarian Affairs and Spatial Planning
	Statistics Indonesia	Amalia Adininggar Widyasanti	President
	National Search and Rescue Agency	Mohammad Syafii	Minister of Transportation
	National Research and Innovation Agency	Arif Satria	President
	National Cyber and Crypto Agency	Nugroho Sulistyo Budi	Coordinating Minister for Political and Security Affairs
	National Standardization Agency	Donny Purnomo	President
	National Administration Institute	Muhammad Taufiq	Minister of State Apparatus Utilization and Bureaucratic Reform
	Government Goods and Services Procurement Policy Institute	Sarah Sadiqa	Minister of National Development Planning
	National Resilience Institute	Ace Hasan Syadzily	Coordinating Minister for Political and Security Affairs
	National Library of Indonesia	Endang Aminudin Aziz	Minister of Primary and Secondary Education
