= Andrie Yunus =

Indonesian human rights activist (born 1998)

- Yunus in September 2025
- Born: 16 June 1998 (age 28); Bogor, West Java, Indonesia
- Occupation: Lawyer
- Years active: 2020–present
- Organization: Commission for Missing Persons and Victims of Violence

Andrie Yunus (born 16 June 1998) is an Indonesian lawyer and human rights activist. He is the deputy coordinator for the Commission for Missing Persons and Victims of Violence, an organisation that investigates enforced disappearances and acts of violence.

== Early life and education ==
Yunus was born in 1998 in Bogor, a city in West Java, Indonesia. He attended SMA Negeri 1, where he participated in student politics; between 2014 and 2015, he served as chair of the Organisasi Siswa Intra Sekolah, a national student council. After finishing high school, Yunus studied at the Indonesian Jentera College of Law, where he focused on constitutional law and legisprudence. During his time at university, he served as chair of the students' representative council. Yunus graduated in 2020 with a bachelor of laws degree; his dissertation was on the role of paralegals in realising equality before the law.

== Activism ==
In 2019, Yunus participated in training on structural and gender legal aid organised by the Indonesian Women's Association for Justice Legal Aid Institute. In 2020, he underwent further training from the Legal Aid Institute and the Yayasan Lembaga Bantuan Hukum Indonesia.

After graduating in 2020, Yunus began working as a legal aid assistant at the Legal Aid Institute, remaining there until 2022 when he began studying at the Anti-Corruption Academy at the IM57+ Institute. In November 2023, Yunus received his advocate licence from the Perhimpunan Advokat Indonesia.

In March 2022, Yunus joined the Commission for Missing Persons and Victims of Violence (Indonesian: Komisi untuk Orang Hilang dan Korban Tindak Kekerasan, KontraS), where he initially worked as a public lawyer. In September 2023, he became the head of its human rights advocacy division. In February 2025, Yunus became KontraS' deputy coordinator for external affairs. At KontraS, Yunus contributed to investigations into human rights violations, including the murder of civilians in Timika, Central Papua; the human cage case in Langkat Regency, North Sumatra; and the shooting of civilian demonstrators during a land conflict in Seruyan Regency, Central Kalimantan.

=== 2025 Jakarta Fairmont Hotel occupation ===
On 3 March 2025, Yunus, alongside the Civil Society Coalition for Security Sector Reform, sent a letter to the Indonesian government requesting public information concerning draft amendments to the Indonesian National Armed Forces Act proposed by the First Commission of the House of Representatives of Indonesia. The information was not received until the amendments had already been passed into law. On 15 March, Yunus took part in a protest outside the Jakarta Fairmont Hotel over the government's decision to hold a closed-door meeting with the commission to pass the revisions without allowing public scrutiny of the proposals. The protest was stopped by security officials, though was supported by some members of the public who expressed concern about the potential return of militarism to Indonesia. Security staff at the Jakarta Fairmont filed a criminal complaint against Yunus with the Greater Jakarta Metropolitan Regional Police for "disturbing peace, tranquillity, and public order".

During the subsequent judicial review of the Indonesian National Armed Forces Act revisions at the Constitutional Court of Indonesia, Yunus gave evidence of harassment he had experienced following the protest at the Jakarta Fairmont, including soldiers from the Indonesian National Armed Forces visiting KontraS' office posing as journalists, and being subjected to attacks on social media, including from Hasan Nasbi, the head of the Presidential Communication Office, and military accounts.

=== August 2025 Indonesian protests ===
On 25 August 2025, protests broke out in Indonesia due to economic frustrations and the proposed increase in housing subsidies for members of the People's Consultative Assembly. Following the end of the protests the following month, Yunus announced that KontraS, alongside the Legal Aid Institute and Yayasan Lembaga Bantuan Hukum Indonesia, would form a fact finding commission. On 18 February 2026, the commission published its report, Operasi Pembungkaman Kaum Muda Terbesar Sejak Reformasi (lit. 'The Largest Operation to Silence Youth Since the Reform Era'), which concluded that Affan Kurniawan, a motorcycle taxi driver who had been run over and killed by a police paramilitary armoured vehicle on 28 August, had been murdered, and that his death had escalated the demonstration into a riot.

=== March 2026 acid attack ===
On 12 March 2026, Yunus was the victim of an acid attack perpetrated by four members of the Indonesian National Armed Forces while riding his motorcycle down Jalan Salemba Raya in Jakarta. Yunus suffered 20% burns to the right side of his body, including his eye, face, chest, and hands, and was treated in the intensive care unit at Dr. Cipto Mangunkusumo Hospital in Salemba.

The attack on Yunus was met with condemnation from human rights figures, including Mary Lawlor, the United Nations special rapporteur on human rights defenders; Natalius Pigai, the Minister of Human Rights; Anis Hidayah, the chairperson of KontraS; Ahmad Sahroni, the deputy chairman of the Third Commission of the House of Representatives of Indonesia; and Sugiat Santoso, the deputy chairman of the Komisi XIII Dewan Perwakilan Rakyat Republik Indonesia. On 26 March, it was announced that Yudi Abrimantyo, the TNI's military intelligence unit chief, resigned as a "form of responsibility" for the attack.

The soldiers were identified as Edi Sudarko, Budhi Hariyanto Widhi Cahyono, Nandala Dwi Prasetya and Sami Lakka. On 10 June 2026, a military court found the four perpetrators guilty of planning and carrying out the attack on Yunus and sentenced them to three years in prison. On 20 August, an appellate military court reduced the sentences by six months. In September 2026, the Judicial Commission announced that it had found indications of possible ethical violations by judges handling Yunus' case.
