= National Police Commission =

National Police Commission or National Police Commissioner may refer to:

- National Police Commission (Indonesia)
- National Police Commission (Philippines), or NAPOLCOM
- National Police Commission (South Korea)
- National Police Commissioner (Sweden)
- Various of the agencies listed in the list of law enforcement agencies
