= BPRS =

BPRS may refer to:

- Brief Psychiatric Rating Scale
- Priesterweg station (train station code BPRS), Schöneberg, Tempelhof-Schöneberg, Berlin, Brandenburg, Germany; a Berlin S-Bahn rail station
- Bhogpur Sirwal (train station code BPRS), Firozpur, Punjab, India; a rail station, see List of railway stations in Punjab, India
- Association of Proletarian-Revolutionary Authors (BPRS; German: Bund proletarisch-revolutionärer Schriftsteller), a Weimar Republic era organization of Germany
- Hospital Oversight Agency (Indonesian: BPRS), see List of central government agencies in Indonesia
- Credited Sharia Bank (Indonesian: BPRS), a type of bank in Indonesia, a Sharia-compliant People's Credit Bank of the Indonesian regional development bank

== See also ==
- BPR (disambiguation), for the singular of BPRs
