= Ministry of Hajj and Umrah (disambiguation) =

Ministry of Hajj and Umrah may refer to:

- Ministry of Hajj and Umrah (Indonesia), Government ministry of Indonesia
- Ministry of Hajj and Umrah (Saudi Arabia), Government ministry of Saudi Arabia
