= Mukhtarudin =

Indonesian politician (born 1964)

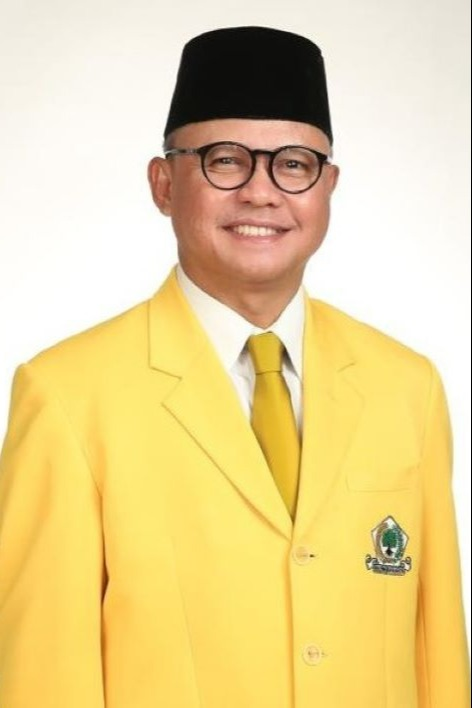
- Mukhtarudin in 2023

Minister of Migrant Workers Protection
- Incumbent
- Assumed office 8 September 2025
- President: Prabowo Subianto
- Deputy: Christina Aryani; Dzulfikar Tawalla
- Preceded by: Abdul Kadir Karding

Personal details
- Born: 6 September 1964 (age 62) Pangkalan Bun, Central Kalimantan, Indonesia
- Party: Golkar
- Spouse: Siti Marwiyah
- Children: 4
- Education: Lambung Mangkurat University
- Occupation: Politician

Mukhtarudin (born 6 September 1964) is an Indonesian politician serving as minister of migrant workers protection since 2025. He was a member of the House of Representatives from 2004 to 2009 and from 2019 to 2025.

== Ministerial Appointment and Early Actions ==
Mukhtarudin was appointed as Indonesia's Minister of Migrant Workers Protection (P2MI) on 8 September 2025 as part of President Prabowo Subianto's second cabinet reshuffle, succeeding Abdul Kadir Karding after the reading of Presidential Decree No. 86P of 2025. His appointment was aimed at strengthening the country's efforts to protect its overseas workers by providing fresh leadership to the ministry.

Shortly after his appointment, he responded to President Prabowo's October 2025 announcement of large-scale job opportunities for Indonesians in Europe. Mukhtarudin outlined his ministry's roadmap to prepare skilled workers, stating it was a moment for the government to accelerate training and placement programs. He explained that his ministry would arrange foreign language training (in English, Arabic, Mandarin, Japanese, and Korean) and special skill certifications to enhance the competitiveness of Indonesian workers.

His key initial policy priorities included focusing on strategic sectors such as hospitality, food & beverage, healthcare (nurses and caregivers), welding, mechanics, electrical technicians, and skilled construction. He also emphasized the importance of inter-agency coordination with other ministries—including Education (for language programs), Health (for caregiver certification), and Manpower (for vocational training)—to prepare workers effectively. While pursuing overseas opportunities, he affirmed the government's continued priority on domestic job creation, describing labor export as a strategy to reduce unemployment and increase remittances.

== Political and Professional Career Before Ministry ==
Mukhtarudin has a long career in politics and public service, primarily with the Golkar Party. Before his ministerial appointment, he served as the Secretary of the Golkar Faction in the House of Representatives (DPR-RI).

=== Legislative Tenure ===
Period	Constituency / Term	Committee Assignments
2004–2009	First term as a DPR-RI member representing Central Kalimantan.	Information on specific committee assignments during this term is not detailed in available sources.
2019–2025	Re-elected and served two terms in the DPR-RI.	· Commission VI (2019–2021): Oversaw Trade, Cooperatives, SMEs, State-Owned Enterprises, Investment, and National Standardization. · Commission VII (2021–2025): Handled Energy, Research & Technology, and Industry. · Member of the State Budget Committee (Badan Anggaran).

=== Golkar Party Roles ===
His extensive party career included serving as the Vice Chairman of the Golkar DPD II for West Kotawaringin Regency and as the Head of the Division for Natural and Social Disaster Management at the DPP of the Golkar Party from 2019 to 2024.

=== Early career ===
Before entering national politics, Mukhtarudin worked as a civil servant (ASN) from 1990 to 2002, with his last position being Head of the Promotion Division at the Regional Investment Agency of West Kotawaringin Regency. He was also a lecturer at what is now Antakusuma University in Pangkalan Bun and was involved in its founding.

== Personal Background ==
Mukhtarudin was born on 6 September 1964 in Pangkalan Bun, Central Kalimantan. He is married to Siti Marwiyah, and they have four children. He earned a Bachelor's degree in Public Administration (S-1 Ilmu Administrasi Negara) from Lambung Mangkurat University.

== See also ==
- Politics of Indonesia
- Golkar
- Prabowo Subianto
- Indonesian migrant workers
