= Mochamad Irfan Yusuf =

Indonesian politician (born 1962)

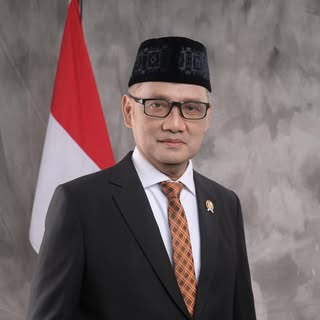
- Mochamad Irfan Yusuf in 2025

2nd Minister of Hajj and Umrah
- Incumbent
- Assumed office 8 September 2025
- President: Prabowo Subianto
- Deputy: Dahnil Anzar Simanjuntak
- Preceded by: Mohammad Farid Ma'ruf

1st Head of the Hajj Management Authority
- In office 22 October 2024 – 8 September 2025
- President: Prabowo Subianto
- Deputy: Dahnil Anzar Simanjuntak
- Preceded by: Position established
- Succeeded by: Position abolised himself as Minister of Hajj and Umrah

Member of the House of Representatives
- In office 1 October 2024 – 22 October 2024
- Vote count: 77.433 votes (2024)
- Parliamentary group: Gerindra faction
- Constituency: East Java VIII

Personal details
- Born: 24 June 1962 (age 63) Jombang, East Java, Indonesia
- Party: Gerindra

Mochamad Irfan Yusuf (born 24 June 1962) is an Indonesian politician serving as minister of Hajj and Umrah since 2025. From 2024 to 2025, he served as chairman of the Hajj Management Authority. In 2024, he was a member of the House of Representatives.
