= Indonesian National Armed Forces Act =

2004 law on military-civil relations

The Indonesian National Armed Forces Act (Indonesian: Undang-Undang Tentara Nasional Indonesia), officially the Act No. 34 of 2004 on the Indonesian National Armed Forces (Indonesian: Undang-Undang Nomor 34 Tahun 2004 tentang Tentara Nasional Indonesia), is a legislation that regulates the organization, role and duties of the Indonesian National Armed Forces (TNI) and its relations with other agencies. The law is the successor to the Armed Forces Servicemen Act of 1988, which was repealed in light of the reform movement in Indonesia that dismantled most of the armed forces' non-military roles.

== History ==
=== Armed Forces Servicemen Act of 1988 (Act No. 2 of 1988) ===
Armed Forces Personnel Act

House of Representatives
- Long title: Act No. 2 of 1988 on the Personnel of the Republic of Indonesia Armed Forces
- Enacted by: Suharto
- Enacted: 1 March 1988
- Signed by: Sudharmono
- Signed: 1 March 1988

Legislative history
- Introduced by: Suharto
- Introduced: 11 November 1987
- First reading: 23 November 1987
- Second reading: 2 and 10 December 1987
- Third reading: 8 January to 19 February 1988
- Passed: 22 February 1988
- Voting summary: 398 voted for; None voted against; None abstained; 101 absent

Repealed by
- Indonesian National Armed Forces Act
- Status: Repealed

The Armed Forces Servicemen Law, officially the Law No. 2 of 1988 on the Soldiers of the Armed Forces of the Republic of Indonesia, was the predecessor to the current armed forces law. The law repealed a number of armed forces laws enacted in the 1950s and was intended to set the guidelines for the armed forces and its branches, including the police, and established the Total People's Defense and Security System (Sishankamrata, Sistem Pertahanan dan Keamanan Rakyat Semesta). The law also codified the Dwifungsi doctrine, the armed forces' dual function as a defense force as well as a dominating force in social and political affairs.

The law had already been proposed as early as 1985. It was not until two years later that the bill was intensively discussed by the armed forces at the Armed Forces’ Leadership Annual Conference, which was held from 21 to 23 October 1987. The armed forces commander, L. B. Moerdani, stated that the law was a direct continuation of the Law No. 20 of 1982 on Defense and Security Principles. The draft law proposed in the conference included a detailed elaboration on Sishankamrata as well as increasing the retirement age of flag officers from 55 to 60 years, which was based on the increase in the quality of life and followed the examples of Thailand and the United States. Moerdani himself proposed the bill to be enacted on 19 December that year, in time for the 39th anniversary of the Second Dutch military offensive and the inauguration of the armed forces new headquarters in Cilangkap. However, the deadline was scrapped due to time constraints, with the bill's special committee chairman A. A. Baramuli describing the deadline as impossible to fulfill.

The bill was officially proposed through a presidential letter on 11 November 1987, with Presiden Suharto appointing Minister of Defence and Security Poniman as his representative in hearings and meetings with the legislative. Although the president only proposed a single bill, the Golkar faction in the House of Representative argued that the bill required the amendment of several provisions on mandatory military service and armed forces recruitment in Law No. 20 of 1982. Golkar proposed an additional bill on the amendment of Law No. 20 of 1982 shortly afterwards, regarding the recruitment of trained civilians (ratih, rakyat terlatih) between Golkar and the armed forces faction.

Hearings on the two bills were described as heated, with the entire process taking about five months. After the bill was submitted, the first hearing was held on 23 November 1987, with house deputy chair Saiful Sulun as chairperson. The main agenda of the meeting was to hear the government's explanation on each bill, delivered by Minister of Defence and Security Poniman. The second hearing on the stance of each faction in the House of Representatives was held on 2 December, which was followed by the government's response in an open session eight days later. The house's deliberative body decided to establish a special committee to handle the two bills, with the four factions inside the house of representatives nominating their candidates for the special committee a day later.

The special committee was established on 12 December with 30 permanent members (17 from Golkar, 6 from the armed forces, 4 from the United Development Party, and 3 from the Indonesian Democratic Party) and 17 alternate members (9 from Golkar, 3 from the armed forces, 3 from the United Development Party, and 2 from the Indonesian Democratic Party). The special committee was chaired by former governor A. A. Baramuli, with former national police deputy chief Sabar Kumbino, air vice marshal Joni Herlaut Sumardjono, cleric Imron Rosyadi, and independence veteran Ipik Asmasoebrata as deputy chairmen. From 8 January to 19 February, the special committee held meetings with representatives from the Department of Defence and Security. During the course of the meetings, a total of 228 proposals were discussed from the four factions, with the most—80 proposals—coming from the Golkar faction.

In the final session of the special committee, the Golkar faction spokesperson Anak Agung Oka Mahendra softly criticized the nature of the meetings by quoting a Javanese proverb that refers to a lack of deliberation. One of the officials who was involved in the bill also criticized the lack of understanding of the bill's philosophical nature by the members of the special committee, which resulted in tensions and heated debates. Eventually, the bill was passed in a plenary session of the House of Representatives on 22 February 1988, with all 398 members—out of 499—who attended the session unanimously approving the bill. The bill was signed into law on 1 March, in commemoration of the 39th anniversary of the General Offensive of 1 March 1949.

=== Indonesian National Armed Forces Law of 2004 (Law No. 34 of 2004) ===
==== Background ====
The Armed Forces Personnel Law's function was retained until the fall of Suharto in May 1998. Popular pressure on the armed forces dwifungsi doctrine prompted the armed forces commander Wiranto to reform the armed forces paradigm and role, as stated in his Armed Forces Day speech of 5 October 1998. A new doctrine, which was named the new paradigm, dismantled the non-military functions of the armed forces. In light of the new paradigm, a number of new legislations were made to enforce the new doctrine. These legislations, according to Director-General of Defense Resources Rear Admiral Darmawan, mandated the existence of an armed forces law.

As early as December 2000, University of Indonesia international relations scholar Kusnanto Anggoro proposed four separate bills regarding defense on security—in which the armed forces bill was included. According to Kusnanto, the bills were necessary to implement the reforms that had already been declared by the armed forces in the previous year. Similar demand was voiced by military observer Ikrar Nusa Bhakti in 2001, who argued that the bills must be drafted immediately after the national defense bill was submitted to the House of Representatives. On that year, in response to the demands, discussions regarding the law began between the armed forces and the department of defense.

==== Formulation and submission ====
The draft bill began to be formulated shortly after the national defense bill was enacted into law. After the armed forces finished drafting the bill, the bill was scrutinized by the defense department's legal bureau and was examined by other departments. During the course of the scrutiny process, there were several articles that became a subject of focus, such as article 19 regarding the deployment of armed forces in the time of emergency, which did not require the consent of the president. The bill faced protests from various groups such as Commission for Missing Persons and Victims of Violence, the Union of Indonesian Nationalist Students, the People's Democratic Party, and a coalition of 31 non-governmental organizations, due to it being perceived as an attempt to return to the old dwifungsi doctrine. Defence analyst Philips Jusario Vermonte stated that the bill reflected the "failure of [civilian] control over the military", while Bambang Wisudo, writing for Kompas, described the bill as "contradictory to the will to create a reliable defense force under the control of democratic civilian authorities". Due to this controversy, various non-governmental organizations which were initially involved in the discussion of the bill were left out by the government. A working group established by the Department of Defense to discuss the law in 2002 became dormant around the same time.

In the midst of the election silence prior to the 2004 Indonesian presidential election, on 30 June 2004 President Megawati Sukarnoputri submitted the bill to the House of Representatives, assigning the Coordinating Minister for Political and Security Affairs, Minister of Defense, and the Armed Forces Commander as the executive's representatives in the discussion. The involvement of a coordinating minister in the discussion of the bill was considered out of the ordinary, as usually only departmental ministers were involved in a bill. According to defense observer T. Hari Prihatono, the decision was in direct violation to the preceding national defense law, as the law mandated the discussion of the bill only to the department of defense.

Other irregularities were also discovered in the submission process. The submitted bill was a result of a meeting held by the Coordinating Minister for Political and Security Affairs Office on 10 June, despite the fact that the Department of Defence was the main agency involved in drafting the bill. A letter by cabinet secretary Bambang Kesowo on 2 July 2004, which instructed the three cabinet members to report all substantive changes of the bill directly to the president also seemed odd, as usually executive representatives could make decisions on substantive changes without prior consultation to the president.

The submission process, as well as the bill's substance, was criticized by various parties, including the legislative. Prihartono stated that the bill was submitted during a short recess period of the house, leaving only ten days for thorough examination of the bill. MP Effendy Choirie, deputy chairman of the House of Representative's 1st commission—the Department of Defense's counterpart in the legislative body—stated that the commission had frequently demanded the executive branch to submit the bill and refused to be blamed on the long overdue. The executive, on the other hand, did not provide any clear explanation for the overdue. Defence observer Edy Prasetyono also criticized the lack of transparency and the overlapping agencies in its drafting process. Concerns regarding the hastened nature of the bill was also shared by presidential candidate Susilo Bambang Yudhoyono.

Regarding the substance of the bill, Edy Prasetyono, who had been a member of the Department of Defense's working group, stated that the submitted bill was different to what has been discussed by the Department of Defense, especially regarding article two on the armed force's identity. The bill defines the armed force's identity based on historical factors, which contradicts the People's Consultative Assembly decree that defines the armed forces as a modern, professional army aligned with humanitarian law. Edy demanded the government's explanation on the draft produced by the working group and urged the House of Representatives to scrutinize the bill and involve as many non-governmental organizations as possible. Prihartono stated that the bill lacks clarity on the armed force's role in the legal system and its authority within a democratic civilian government, failed to reflect efforts to build professionalism within the armed forces, and could potentially revive the dwifungsi. The criticisms were responded harshly by the military, with army chief of staff Ryamizard Ryacudu accusing the critics of being backed by foreign interests, and armed forces commander Endriartono Sutarto urging the experts "not to fool the public".

From 26 August to 29 September 2004, the house held hearings with the executive regarding the bill. The main debates surrounding the bill was regarding the territorial commands, which was a considered a remnant of the dwifungsi doctrine, and the position of the armed forces in the government hierarchy. The National Awakening Party faction submitted an alternative bill, which placed the armed forces under the Department of Defense and merged all levels of territorial commands into a single regional defence command (Indonesian: Komando Daerah Pertahanan). The bill was eventually passed as law on 30 September 2004 with minor revisions from the original coordinating minister's draft and unanimous approval from the parliament. It was the last bill passed by the 1999—2004 period of the House of Representatives before it went out of office the next day. The bill was signed into law by Megawati on 16 October 2004, four days before she was replaced by Susilo Bambang Yudhoyono.

During the course of the submission and hearings, protests in opposition of the bill erupted sporadically in various cities. In a discussion held by Nahdlatul Ulama on 23 July 2004, a coalition of non-government organizations and student organizations declared their rejection of the bill. The self-declared Alliance of Women Against the Armed Forces Bill staged a protest near the Hotel Indonesia, while separate protests were held in front of the Merdeka Palace and the parliament building. In Yogyakarta, the alliance of Yogyakarta student council, the Union of Muhammadiyah Students, and the Muslim Students' Association staged protests against the bill. Student protests were also held in Surabaya by the Suroboyo People's Action Committee and the Surabaya Labor Struggle Union, Semarang by the National Student League for Democracy, Denpasar by the Coalition of Bali Civilians, Malang by the Anti-Military Front, and Bandar Lampung.

=== 2025 revision of Indonesian National Armed Forces Law ===
The attempts to revise the Armed Forces Law were initiated by 2019–24 term of the DPR, however, it could not succeed due to harsh criticism by various parties. The plans included the expansion for civilian positions allowed to be occupied by soldiers, and allowing soldiers to be involved in businesses. In a plenary session of 18 February 2025, the DPR re-included the revision plan into the Priority National Legislation Programme of 2025. Beginning in March 2025, they began to hold meetings with the Indonesian Armed Forces Retirees Association (Pepabri) on 10 March, followed by various elements of the government, including Minister of Defence Sjafrie Sjamsoeddin, on 13 March. Next day, Commander of the TNI Agus Subiyanto, as well as chiefs of staff of the Army, Navy, and Air Forces, went to attend a meeting of the First Commission of the DPR.

Despite the harsh rejection of this revision, the government continued its discussion, to the extent that the DPR held a closed meeting at Fairmont Hotel in Senayan, Jakarta for two days. On 15 March, the Civil Society Coalition led by Andrie Yunus stormed a representatives meeting held at the hotel minutes before iftar. During the storming, representatives consisting of the First Commission of the House of Representatives were discussing passage the revision of the Armed Forces law behind closed doors for 2 days. The protesters were later dispersed by the security guards. Following this, the second wave of student-led protests erupted, calling for its repeal. The important points of this version, include:

- Chapter 3:
  - Armed Forces, previously subordinated to both the President of Indonesia and Ministry of Defense (Kemhan), is now fully subordinated to Kemhan.
- Chapter 7:
  - Non-war military operations (OMSP) were increased from previous 14 into 16 tasks. The newly-added two tasks include protection efforts against cyberattacks, and protection of Indonesian citizens and national interests overseas.
- Chapter 47:
  - Civilian positions allowed to be occupied by TNI members, were increased from previous 10 into 14 positions. Five of them include National Agency for Disaster Countermeasure (BNPB), National Border Management Agency (BNPP), National Counter Terrorism Agency (BNPT), Maritime Security Agency (Bakamla), and Attorney General's Office (Kejagung). The proposal to add Ministry of Marine Affairs and Fisheries (KKP) into this list was shortly abandoned before its ratification.
- Chapter 53:
  - Retirement ages vary by the rank of a soldier:
  - Non-commissioned officers (bintara) and private (tamtama): 55 years
  - Commissioned officers (perwira) up to colonel (kolonel): 58 years
  - One-star high officer (perwira tinggi bintang 1): 60 years
  - Two-star high officer (perwira tinggi bintang 2): 61 years
  - Three-star high officer (perwira tinggi bintang 3): 62 years
  - Four-star high officer (perwira tinggi bintang 4): 63 years, or can be extended twice by a presidential decree

On 19 March, Commission I of DPR and the government finally agreed to ratify the law next day, and it officially took effect on 20 March during a plenary session. This law was strongly criticised by various parties because it would potentially revive dwifungsi, leading to an online petition calling for repeal of the revision on Change.org (as of 28 March, it had been signed by more than 57 thousand people).
