= Hajj Management Authority =

Government agency of Indonesia

- Badan Penyelenggara Haji
- Badan Penyelenggara Haji

Agency overview
- Formed: 22 October 2024 (announcement); 5 November 2024
- Preceding Agency: Directorate General of Hajj and Umrah, Ministry of Religious Affairs (partial)
- Dissolved: 8 September 2025
- Superseding Agency: Ministry of Hajj and Umrah
- Jurisdiction: Government of Indonesia
- Agency executives: Mochamad Irfan Yusuf, Head; Dahnil Anzar Simanjuntak, Deputy Head
- Website: https://haji.go.id

The Hajj Management Authority (Indonesian: Badan Penyelenggara Haji, lit. 'Hajj Organizing Agency') was an Indonesian government cabinet-level agency in charge of organizing the Hajj. The agency is led by a head, Mochamad Irfan Yusuf, since 22 October 2024.

Along with the Halal Product Assurance Organizing Agency, this agency is the result of a spin-off of the Ministry of Religious Affairs. Previously, hajj organizing affairs were the responsibility of the Directorate General of Hajj and Umrah within the ministry. Still, since the spin-off, the Directorate General of Hajj and Umrah exists but has transformed into technical policing and standardization for Hajj affairs, not organizing Hajj.

On 11 July 2025, Indonesian government announced plan to elevate the agency into full-fledged Ministry of Hajj and Umrah in 2026. On 8 September 2025, the Ministry of Hajj and Umrah officially formed, ending the agency.

== Organization ==
Based on Presidential Decree No. 154/2024, the Hajj Management Authority is organized into the following:

- Office of the Head of Hajj Management Authority
- Office of the Deputy Head of Hajj Management Authority
- Agency Secretariat
  - Bureau of Planning and Organization
  - Bureau of Legal Affairs and Human Resources
  - Bureau of Finance and General Affairs
- Deputy for Domestic Hajj Services Coordination (Deputy I)
  - Directorate of Administrative and Documentative Supports for Regular Hajj Pilgrims
    - Sub-directorate of Executive Support for Regular Hajj Pilgrims Registration
    - Sub-directorate of Document Verification and Facilitation for Special Needs Hajj Pilgrims
    - Sub-directorate of Document Verification for Regular Hajj Pilgrims Registration
  - Directorate of Accommodation, Consumption, and Transportation Supports
    - Sub-directorate of Accommodation and Consumption Supports
    - Sub-directorate of Transportation Supports
  - Directorate of Hajj Pilgrims and Officials Fostering
    - Sub-directorate of Hajj Pilgrims Fostering Supports
    - Sub-directorate of Hajj Officials Fostering Supports
- Deputy for Foreign Hajj Services Coordination (Deputy II)
  - Directorate of Accommodation, Consumption, and Transportation Supports
    - Sub-directorate of Hajj Accommodation Supports
    - Sub-directorate of Hajj Consumption Supports
    - Sub-directorate of Hajj Transportation Supports
  - Directorate of Partnership Facilitation and Masyā'ir (Ritualistic Services) Services
    - Sub-directorate of Partnership Facilitation
    - Sub-directorate of Masyā'ir Services
    - Sub-directorate of Supporting for Masyā'ir Officers Control
  - Directorate of Hajj Economic Ecosystem Development Supports
    - Sub-directorate for Mapping Support of Hajj Economic Ecosystem Development
    - Sub-directorate for Partnership Support of Hajj Economic Ecosystem Development
- Deputy for Hajj Supervision, Hajj Monitoring, and Hajj Organizing Evaluation (Deputy III)
  - Directorate of Domestic Hajj Supervision, Hajj Monitoring, and Hajj Organizing Evaluation
    - Sub-directorate of Regular Domestic Hajj Supervision, Hajj Monitoring, and Hajj Organizing Evaluation
    - Sub-directorate of Special Domestic Hajj Supervision, Hajj Monitoring, and Hajj Organizing Evaluation
  - Directorate of Foreign Hajj Supervision, Hajj Monitoring, and Hajj Organizing Evaluation
    - Sub-directorate of Regular Foreign Hajj Supervision, Hajj Monitoring, and Hajj Organizing Evaluation
    - Sub-directorate of Special Foreign Hajj Supervision, Hajj Monitoring, and Hajj Organizing Evaluation
  - Directorate of Strategic Formulation and Administrative Formulation for Hajj Management
    - Sub-directorate of Standard Operational Procedure Development
    - Sub-directorate of Administrative Management Development
- Inspectorate
- Center of Data, Information, and Technology
