= BPR =

BPR may refer to:

== Entrepreneurial and finance ==
- Business process re-engineering
- Bank Performance Reports of the U.S. National Bank Surveillance System
- Bank Perkreditan Rakyat (Indonesian: People's Credit Banks) of the Indonesian regional development bank
- Banque Populaire du Rwanda (French: Popular Bank of Rwanda)

== Engineering and machinery ==
- BPR (Quebec firm) (Beaulieu, Poulin, Robitaille), a Canadian engineering firm
- Bottom pressure reader, an instrument type that is part of a tsunami warning system
- Bypass ratio (BPR) of a turbofan jet turbine engine

== Politics and government ==
- Berkeley Political Review, a nonpartisan political magazine.
- Belarusian People's Republic
- Belgorod People's Republic
- Bulgarian People's Republic, former Socialist country and Europe and a member of the Warsaw Pact
- Bureau of Public Roads, United States government agency

== Transportation and vehicular ==
- Batu Ceper railway station (BPR), a railway station in Tangerang, Indonesia
- BPR Global GT Series (Barth, Peter, Ratel), a 1994–1996 international sports car racing series
- Blackburn and Preston Railway (B&PR), Lancashire, England, UK
- Bolton and Preston Railway (B&PR), Lancashire, England, UK
- Bytown and Prescott Railway (B&PR), Ontario, Canada

== Other uses ==
- Blue Ridge Public Radio

== See also ==
- BPRS (disambiguation)
