= Government Communications Agency (Indonesia) =

- Badan Komunikasi Pemerintah

Agency overview
- Formed: 17 September 2025
- Preceding agency: Presidential Communication Office
- Jurisdiction: Indonesia
- Agency executive: Syahganda Nainggolan, Chief
- Website: bakom.go.id

Government Communications Agency (Indonesian: Badan Komunikasi Pemerintah Republik Indonesia, Bakom) is an Indonesian non-structural institution responsible for communicating and disseminating information on strategic policies and priority government programs. This agency replaces the Presidential Communication Office. The agency was established to expand its communications reach. It will also synchronize communications between the central and regional governments.

The Bakom is led by Syahganda Nainggolan since 2 October 2026, who succeeded Muhammad Qodari (27 April 2026 - 2 October 2026) and Angga Raka Prabowo (17 September 2025 - 27 April 2026).

== Gallery ==
Logo of Bakom RI (2025–2026)

Logo of Bakom RI (2026–present)
