= Halal Product Assurance Organizing Agency =

- Badan Penyelenggara Jaminan Produk Halal
- BPJPH & Halal Indonesia logo

Agency overview
- Formed: 22 October 2024 (announcement); 5 November 2024
- Preceding Agency: Halal Product Assurance Organizing Body, Ministry of Religious Affairs
- Jurisdiction: Government of Indonesia
- Agency executives: Haikal Hassan, Head; Afriansyah Noor, Deputy Head

The Halal Product Assurance Organizing Agency (Indonesian: Badan Penyelenggara Jaminan Produk Halal, BPJPH), also known as Halal Indonesia, is an Indonesian government cabinet-level agency in charge of organizing halal certifications. The agency is led by Haikal Hassan since 22 October 2024.

Along with the Hajj Management Authority, this agency results from a spin-off of the Ministry of Religious Affairs. Previously, halal organizing affairs were the responsibility of the Halal Product Assurance Organizing Body. The agency later separated and made into an independent agency.

== Organization ==
Based on Presidential Decree No. 153/2024, and as expanded by Head of Halal Product Assurance Organizing Agency Decree No. 1/2024, the Halal Product Assurance Organizing Agency is organized into the following:

- Office of the Head of Halal Product Assurance Organizing Agency
- Office of the Deputy Head of Halal Product Assurance Organizing Agency
- General Secretariat
  - Bureau of Planning and Organization
    - Division of Organization, Administration, and Evaluation
  - Bureau of Legal, Human Resources, and Public Relations
    - Legal Advocation Division
    - Division of Public Relations and Public Communication
  - Bureau of Finance and General Affairs
    - Leadership Administration Division
      - Head and Deputy Head Administration Subdivision
      - General Secretariat Administration Subdivision
      - Protocol Subdivision
      - Deputy I Administration Subdivision
      - Deputy II Administration Subdivision
      - Deputy III Administration Subdivision
    - Procurement, General, Finance, and State Properties Division
- Deputy for Halal Partnerships and Standardization (Deputy I)
  - Directorate of Halal Partnerships and Cooperation
    - Sub-directorate of Domestic Halal Partnerships and Cooperation
    - Sub-directorate of Foreign Halal Partnerships and Cooperation
  - Directorate of Halal Standards
    - Sub-directorate of Accreditation for Foreign Halal Institutions and Halal Inspection Agency
- Deputy for Halal Registration and Certification (Deputy II)
  - Directorate of Halal Registration
    - Sub-directorate of Foreign Halal Certification Verification and Halal Auditors
  - Directorate of Halal Certification
    - Sub-directorate of Regular Halal Certification and Self-declaration
- Deputy for Halal Product Assurance Fostering and Supervision (Deputy III)
  - Directorate of Halal Product Assurance Fostering
    - Sub-directorate of Halal Ecosystem Fostering
  - Directorate of Halal Product Assurance Supervision
    - Sub-directorate of Halal Supervisors Functionaries Fostering
- Inspectorate
- Center for Halal Product Assurance Human Resources Development
- Center for Data, Information, and Technology
