= Hasan Nasbi =

Indonesian political consultant

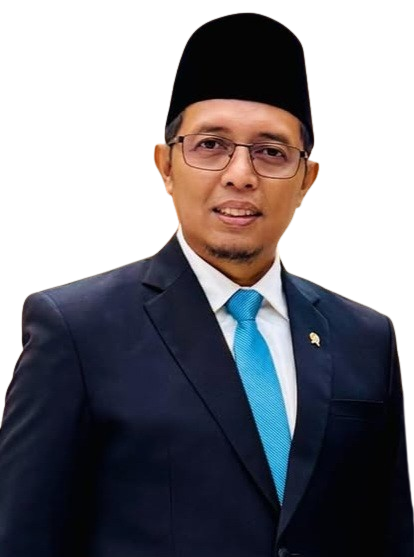

Special Advisor to the President for Communication Affairs
- Incumbent
- Assumed office 27 April 2026
- President: Prabowo Subianto
- Preceded by: Office established

Chief of Presidential Communication Office
- In office 19 August 2024 – 17 September 2025
- President: Joko Widodo; Prabowo Subianto
- Preceded by: Office established
- Succeeded by: Angga Raka Prabowo

Personal details
- Born: 11 October 1979 (age 46) Bukittinggi, West Sumatra, Indonesia
- Party: Independent
- Spouse: Dwi Aprilia
- Children: 3
- Education: University of Indonesia
- Occupation: Consultant

Hasan Nasbi (born 11 October 1979) is an Indonesian political consultant who served as the Chief of the Presidential Communication Office from 19 August 2024 until the office's dissolution on 17 September 2025. His brief tenure was marked by controversy, including a remark about an act of intimidation against a journalist that was criticized by President Prabowo Subianto. He previously was one of the spokespersons for the National Campaign Team of Prabowo Subianto–Gibran Rakabuming Raka in the 2024 Indonesian presidential election.

== Early life and education ==
Hasan was born in Bukittinggi, West Sumatra on 11 October 1979 to a Minangkabau family. His mother is the paternal younger sister of Ahmad Syafi'i Ma'arif.

Hasan enrolled in primary school and Islamic junior high school (MTs) in Kampuang Nan Limo, Kubang Putiah, Banuhampu, Agam Regency. He later studied at SMA Negeri 2 Bukittinggi. He earned a bachelor's degree in political science from the Faculty of Social and Political Sciences of the University of Indonesia in 2004. In October 2000, he became the chairman of the University of Indonesia Muslim Students' Association.

== Career ==
Hasan was one of the founders of the Tan Malaka Research and Community Service Institute in June 2002. He also served as the secretary to Harry A. Poeze, a researcher on Tan Malaka. In October 2004, he became one of the editors of Buletin Madilog: Media Pembelajaran Masyarakat, which was published only three times and circulated on the University of Indonesia. He authored the book Filosofi Negara Menurut Tan Malaka (2004) and was one of the authors of Mewarisi Gagasan Tan Malaka (2006).

Hasan briefly worked as a journalist for Kompas between 2005 and 2006. In 2006, he became a researcher at the Center for Political Studies University of Indonesia until 2008. After that, he founded a survey institute Cyrus Network. In December 2011, he met Surakarta Mayor Joko Widodo, who, based on his institute's survey results, was encouraged to run as a candidate for Governor of Jakarta. In 2012, he served as the Coordinator of the Joko Widodo–Basuki Tjahaja Purnama Volunteer Team for the 2012 Jakarta gubernatorial election. In 2016, he and six of his colleagues funded Teman Ahok with Rp500 million. In January 2023, he made a Toyota Alphard bet with Sunny Tanuwidjaja on whether Anies Baswedan would successfully run as a presidential candidate in the 2024 Indonesian presidential election.

=== Chief of Presidential Communication Office (2024–2025) ===
Hasan Nasbi was appointed Chief of the newly formed Presidential Communication Office on 19 August 2024, serving as a transitional figure between the administrations of President Joko Widodo and President-elect Prabowo Subianto.

In March 2025, his tenure became controversial following his statement regarding an act of intimidation against Tempo journalist Francisca Christy Rosana, who received a severed pig's head from an unidentified sender. Nasbi remarked that the head "should simply be cooked". This comment drew widespread public criticism and was later described as "careless" and "wrong" by President Prabowo Subianto.

On 21 April 2025, Nasbi tendered his resignation. However, in early May, following a directive from President Prabowo for him to remain at his post, he returned to office. His role ended definitively on 17 September 2025 when the Presidential Communication Office was officially dissolved, with its functions transferred to the Government Communications Agency.

=== Post-government career ===
Shortly after the dissolution of the Presidential Communication Office, in September 2025, Hasan Nasbi was appointed as a commissioner at the state-owned energy company Pertamina.

== Wealth report ==
The total wealth amounts to Rp 41.33 billion. It consists of 9 plots of land and buildings worth Rp 13.96 billion, located in South Jakarta, Bekasi, and Bogor. Vehicles and machinery are valued at Rp 9.51 billion, comprising 5 cars and 1 motorcycle. Cash and cash equivalents amount to Rp 17.69 billion, while other assets are valued at Rp 735 million. The total debt amounts to Rp 575 million.
