= Presidential Instruction Number 1 of 2025 =

Presidential Order issued by Prabowo Subianto

The document

Instruction of President of the Republic of Indonesia Number 1 of 2025 on Budget Efficiency in Implementing the State Budget and Regional Budget 2025 is an instructional decree signed by President Prabowo Subianto on 22 January 2025, intended to streamline national and regional spending by cutting 306.69 trillion rupiahs. Its implementation has sparked numerous budget cuts and caused criticism by various parties. The 2025 Indonesian student protesters demanded its repeal.

== Content ==
The document is a six-page long decree instructing the ministers of Red and White Cabinet, the commander of Indonesian National Armed Forces, the chief of Indonesian National Police, the heads of non-ministerial governmental institutions, the leaders of state secretariats, governors, mayors, and regents:

1. To review the use in order to streamline the budgets of:
  1. Ministries under the state budget of 2025;
  2. The state budget of 2025;
  3. Any transfers of the state budget of 2025 into regional governments.
2. To cut the state budget of 2025 amounting up to Rp306,695,177,420,000, which consists of:
  1. Ministerial/institutional budget amounting up to Rp256,100,000,000,000; and
  2. Transfers to regional governments amounting up to Rp50,595,177,420,000.
3. For ministers/institution leaders:
  1. To identify the plans to streamline spending of ministries/institutions according to the size set by the Minister of Finance

== Effects ==
The decree has greatly reduced budgets allocated to governmental bodies in Indonesia. Fifteen ministries and non-ministerial institutions were reportedly affected. The construction of the Capital City of Nusantara has been also affected, since the budget allocated Ministry of Public Works for 2025 has been reduced from 110.95 trillion to 29.57 trillion rupiahs. There are concerns of being stalled.
