= Christina Aryani =

Indonesian politician (born 1975)

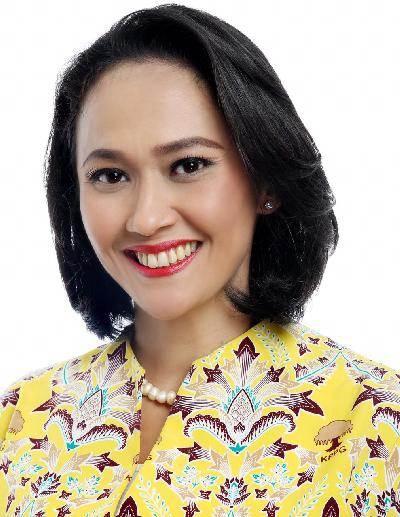

Deputy Minister of Migrant Workers Protection
- Incumbent
- Assumed office 21 October 2024 Serving with Dzulfikar Tawalla
- President: Prabowo Subianto
- Minister: Abdul Kadir Karding
- Preceded by: Office established

Member of People's Representative Council
- In office 1 October 2019 – 1 October 2024
- Constituency: Jakarta II

Personal details
- Born: Christina Aryani; 17 July 1975 (age 51) Jakarta, Indonesia
- Party: Golkar
- Spouse: Darren Soetantyo
- Children: 2
- Education: STIE-IPWI Jakarta; Atma Jaya Catholic University; Universitas Indonesia
- Occupation: Politician

Christina Aryani (born 17 July 1975) is an Indonesian lawyer and politician of the Golkar party who is a Deputy Minister of Migrant Workers Protection since 21 October 2024 and former member of the People's Representative Council, serving since 2019 until 2024.

== Early life and education ==
Christina Aryani was born in Jakarta on 17 July 1975 to Arief Soeratno and Mutiara Lenny Panggabean. She is a Catholic. She graduated from Tarakanita 1 Senior High School in 1993, and later studied business management at an economic institute before obtaining a bachelor's degree in business law from Atma Jaya Catholic University in 2010. She then studied economic law at the University of Indonesia, receiving her master's degree in 2012.

== Career ==
Between 1998 and 2003, Aryani worked at Strategic Communication Laboratories, and created a handbag company before entering legal practice. She also worked at the Jakarta Monorail project.

She first joined the Golkar party in 2006, and was appointed to its central committee in 2009. She ran as a Golkar candidate to represent Central Java's 3rd electoral district in the 2014 legislative election, but was not elected. Following the 2019 Indonesian presidential election, Aryani was one of the lawyers in Joko Widodo's campaign team at the Constitutional Court of Indonesia, facing against Prabowo Subianto's lawsuit disputing the election results. She also ran as a 2019 legislative candidate representing Jakarta's 2nd electoral district, with her campaign including a visit to constituents in Europe (overseas voters were included in Jakarta's 2nd electoral district), and distributing yellow calling cards to her constituents in Jakarta. She won 26,159 votes and qualified for a seat.

Within the legislature, Aryani is part of the first commission. She has stated her opposition to the death penalty.

On 21 October 2024, Aryani was appointed into the newly formed Ministry of Indonesian Migrant Workers Protection as deputy minister under Abdul Kadir Karding.
