= Indonesian Food and Drug Authority =

Government agency of Indonesia

- Badan Pengawas Obat dan Makanan; BPOM
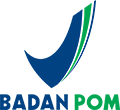
- Logo of Badan POM

Agency overview
- Formed: 1936; 90 years ago
- Preceding agency: Directorate General of Drug and Food Control of Ministry of Health
- Jurisdiction: Government of Indonesia
- Headquarters: Jl. Percetakan Negara No.23, Central Jakarta 10520, Indonesia
- Agency executive: Taruna Ikrar, Head of BPOM
- Website: www.pom.go.id

The Indonesian Food and Drug Authority (Indonesian: Badan Pengawas Obat dan Makanan, lit. 'Food and Drug Supervisory Agency'; BPOM) is a government agency of Indonesia responsible for protecting public health through the control and supervision of prescription and over-the-counter pharmaceutical drugs, vaccines, biopharmaceuticals, dietary supplements, food safety, traditional medicine and cosmetics. Its role is similar to that of the United States Food and Drug Administration.

BPOM is a non-ministerial government agency that carries out government duties in the field of drug and food control. It is under and directly responsible to the president, and coordinates with the minister responsible for health affairs. Since 2017, BPOM has been regulated by Presidential Decree No. 80/2017.

== History ==
The predecessor of BPOM was formed during the colonial period and was named de Dienst der Volksgezondheid (DVG). Operating under the auspices of the Dutch pharmaceutical company, DVG itself was in charge of producing chemical drugs as well as operating a pharmaceutical research center. In 1964, during the Guided Democracy era, DVG was nationalized and became the Pharmacy Inspectorate (Inspektorat Farmasi) of the Indonesian Ministry of Health. Three years later, it was renamed the Inspectorate of Pharmaceutical Affairs (Inspektorat Urusan Farmasi). In 1976, it was again renamed the Directorate General Drug and Food Control (Direktorat Jenderal Pengawasan Obat dan Makanan, Ditjen POM).

In accordance with Presidential Decree No. 166/2000, the Directorate-General of Drug and Food Control was officially divested from the Ministry of Health to become an independent agency which reports directly to the president, though it continues to coordinate with the Ministry. Since 2017, BPOM has been regulated by Presidential Decree No. 80/2017.

BPOM was subsequently established as a Non-ministerial government body to carry out government functions in the supervision of drugs and food, as part of efforts to protect consumer rights and public health. Under this framework, BPOM was given authority over drugs and food circulating in Indonesia, including products manufactured domestically and those imported from abroad. BPOM's supervision includes sampling, testing, and laboratory analysis of food and beverages to identify hazardous substances, as well as monitoring compliance with safety, quality, and labeling requirements. This supervision is carried out across pre-market and post-market stages, supported by enforcement actions and public participation.

Institutionally, BPOM is directly responsible to the president and coordinates with the minister responsible for health affairs. Operationally, BPOM carries out its duties through a system of technical units, including Balai Besar POM, Balai POM, and Loka POM.

Since 2017, BPOM has been regulated by Presidential Decree No. 80/2017, which strengthened its institutional position and authority in drug and food supervision and emphasized its strategic national role in protecting public health.

In 2020, the head of BPOM issued a decree standardizing the official English-language name of the agency. The agency was previously known in English as the National Agency for Drug and Food Control.

In late 2025, BPOM received recognition from the World Health Organization as a WHO Listed Authority (WLA), which marked international recognition of Indonesia's drug and food regulatory system.

== Task and function ==
=== Task ===
As stipulated in article 2 of Presidential Decree No. 80/2017, BPOM was tasked to execute government role in the field of drug and food control.

=== Function ===
According to article 3 of Presidential Decree No. 80/2017, BPOM has the following functions:

1. Drafting and executing national policy in drug and food control;
2. Drafting and establish norms, standard, procedure, and criterion in supervision on before and after obtaining marketing authorisation;
3. Executing supervision before and after obtaining marketing authorisation;
4. Coordinating drug and food control within the central and regional governments;
5. Providing technical assistance and supervision in drug and food control;
6. Enforcing the law in regards to the field of drug and food control;
7. Coordinating execution, supervision and administrative support for all entity within BPOM;
8. Managing state assets within BPOM;
9. Overseeing task and functions execution within BPOM.

== Organization ==
Based on article 5 of Presidential Decree No. 80/2017, and as expanded by BPOM Decrees No. 21/2020 and 13/2022, BPOM is organized into the following:

- Head of Indonesian Food and Drug Authority
- Principal Secretariat
- Deputy of Drugs, Narcotics, Psychotropics, Precursors, and Addictive Substances Control
  - Directorate of Drugs, Narcotics, Psychotropics, Precursors and Addictive Substances Standardization
  - Directorate of Drugs Registration
  - Directorate of Drugs, Narcotics, Psychotropics, Precursors Production Control
  - Directorate of Drugs, Narcotics, Psychotropics, Precursors Distribution and Services Control
  - Directorate of Safety, Quality, and Export-Import Control of Drugs, Narcotics, Psychotropics, Precursors, and Addictive Substances
- Deputy for Traditional Medicines, Health Supplements, and Cosmetics Control
  - Directorate of Traditional Medicines, Health Supplements, and Cosmetics Standardization
  - Directorate of Traditional Medicines, Health Supplements, and Cosmetics Registration
  - Directorate of Traditional Medicines and Health Supplements Control
  - Directorate of Cosmetics Control
  - Directorate of Community and Enterprises Empowerment of Traditional Medicines, Health Supplements and Cosmetics
- Deputy for Processed Food Control
  - Directorate of Processed Food Standardization
  - Directorate of Processed Food Registration
  - Directorate of Processed Food Production Control
  - Directorate of Processed Food Distribution Control
  - Directorate of Community and Enterprises Empowerment of Processed Food
- Deputy for Law Enforcement
  - Directorate of Prevention and Protection
  - Directorate of Food and Drug Intelligence
  - Directorate of Cyber of Food and Drug
  - Directorate of Food and Drug Investigation
- Principal Inspectorate

BPOM has four centers, those are:

- Center for Drug and Food Data and Information on Food and Drug Administration
- Center for Human Resource Development of Food and Drugs Control
- Center of National Quality Control Laboratory of Drugs and Food
- Center of Drug and Food Policy Analysis

BPOM maintains regional offices across Indonesia. These consist of:

- Balai Besar POM (Major Regional Offices)
- Balai POM (Regional Offices), and
- Loka POM (Local Offices).
