= Dwifungsi =

Political doctrine by Suharto

Dwifungsi (lit. 'dual function') was a political doctrine implemented by Suharto's military-dominated New Order government in Indonesia following the removal of President Sukarno. Dwifungsi was used to justify the ABRI—especially the Indonesian Army—permanently increasing its influence in the Indonesian government, including reserved military-only seats in the parliament, and top positions in the nation's public service.

== Origins ==
After the 1949 transfer of sovereignty, the Army accepted civilian rule. As the weaknesses of political system became apparent, officers increasingly felt they had a responsibility to involve themselves in politics to "save the nation". When martial law was declared in 1957, the Army expanded its role into political economic and administrative areas.

Army chief-of-staff Nasution was keen to continue this after martial law lifted, and therefore developed the "Middle Way" concept in which Army would neither try to take power nor remain inactive.

From 25 to 31 August 1966, the Second Army Seminar was held. The attendees were senior Army officers and more than 100 participants from the Army Staff College (SESKOAD). It revised the Army doctrine, which was seen as containing too much communist influence. This new doctrine laid down the Army's non-military functions, namely "to participate in every effort and activity of the people in the field of ideology, politics and economics and the socio-cultural field"

It also produced a document entitled "The Army's Contribution of Ideas to the Ampera Cabinet". This had two parts:

1. Plan for political stabilisation
2. Plan for economic stabilisation

== Implementation ==
Through dwifungsi and the New Order political vehicle, Golkar, the ABRI (especially the army) was able to enmesh itself into all levels of Indonesian society, in a manner that reached its peak in the 1990s, but remains strong. Active ABRI officers during Suharto's presidency held key positions in all levels of government in Indonesia, including city mayors, provincial government, ambassadorships, state-owned corporations, the judiciary, and Suharto's cabinet.

During the New Order, the military had a seat in the People's Consultative Assembly (MPR) through the ABRI parliamentary group (Fraksi ABRI). Up to 1997, the ABRI parliamentary group consisted of 100 servicemen elected by the armed forces, but the number would later decrease to 75 after the 1997 election.

== Demise ==
Dwifungsi was gradually abolished following the collapse of New Order regime and the start of the Reform era. At the ABRI leadership meeting in 2000 under the presidency of Abdurrahman Wahid (Gus Dur) it was agreed to abolish the doctrine, which would begin after the 2004 election. All military and police officers that would like to hold political position have to leave their military career; the former President Susilo Bambang Yudhoyono was a former army officer when he was elected.

After 1999 election, 38 out of 700 members of the MPR for 1999–2004 term were from ABRI officers – which would be consisted of separated military and police. Active military and police officers was removed starting with 2004–2009 term.

== Potential revival ==
Following the recent revisions to Indonesia's Undang-Undang Tentara Nasional Indonesia (TNI Law), concerns have emerged regarding the potential revival of the Dwifungsi doctrine, which originally granted the Indonesian National Armed Forces (TNI) a dual role in both defense and civilian governance. Under the New Order regime, this doctrine allowed the military to exercise significant influence over civilian political and social affairs, which some argue contributed to the erosion of democratic processes.

The revisions, which were passed in early 2025, have been criticized by civil society groups and political observers. These changes allow active-duty military personnel to assume positions within civilian government, a move that some believe could pave the way for a return to military dominance in the political sphere. Critics argue that this could undermine Indonesia's democratic gains since the fall of the New Order regime in 1998.

However, proponents of the revisions, including President Prabowo Subianto and Defense Minister Sjafrie Sjamsoeddin, contend that the changes are necessary to adapt the military to contemporary challenges, particularly in the face of regional instability and modern warfare requirements. The government has emphasized that military personnel would still need to resign from active service before assuming most civilian roles, which they argue prevents conflicts of interest and preserves democratic accountability.

Despite these assurances, the potential for a Dwifungsi-like revival remains a point of contention, with critics urging caution and vigilance to ensure that Indonesia does not regress into the military-controlled governance seen under the New Order.
