= Agency for Development Control and Special Investigation =

Indonesian government agency

- Badan Pengendalian Pembangunan dan Investigasi Khusus
- Logo of Bappisus, 2025

Agency overview
- Formed: 22 October 2024 (announcement); 5 November 2024
- Jurisdiction: Government of Indonesia
- Minister responsible: Aries Marsudiyanto, Chief of the Agency for Development Control and Special Investigation
- Parent department: Ministry of the State Secretariat

The Agency for Development Control and Special Investigation (Indonesian: Badan Pengendalian Pembangunan dan Investigasi Khusus, Bappisus) is an Indonesian government cabinet-level agency in charge of the supervision, control, monitoring, and investigation of the conformity of presidential programs execution. The ministry has been led by a chief, Aries Marsudiyanto, since 22 October 2024.

Rini Widyantini, Minister of State Administrative and Bureaucratic Reform, stated that the agency is the official presidential fixer, as it is a troubleshooter and solver of technical and operational problems that plagued infrastructure development in Indonesia. Unlike many state agencies in Indonesia based on particular laws, the agency ensures that the presidential programs are executed in line with the sitting president's vision and mission as the guideline of the agency.

== History ==
Existence of official presidential fixers had existed since Suharto administration. During the New Order period, Suharto possessed presidential fixers under the aegis of the military-controlled Controlling Secretary of Development Operations (Indonesian: Sekretariat Pengendali Operasi Pembangunan, Sesdalopbang), a division of the State Secretariat which only answer to him personally and performing as the state fixers of every state developmental problem. In post-reformation period, there were no presidential fixers until Susilo Bambang Yudhoyono first administration revived the agency in form of Presidential Working Unit for the Program Management and Reformation (Indonesian: Unit Kerja Presiden Pengelolaan Program dan Reformasi, UKP3R), which then raised to Presidential Working Unit for the Monitoring and Development Control (Indonesian: Unit Kerja Presiden Bidang Pengawasan dan Pengendalian Pembangunan, UKP-PPP or UKP4) in his second administration.

When Joko Widodo ascend to presidency in his first administration, he disbanded the UKP4 in favor of Executive Office of the President of the Republic of Indonesia due to UKP4 relatively large size at that time which was consisted of 6 deputies and have overlapping state internal auditing responsibilities with the existing Financial and Development Supervisory Board[id] and also strategic formulations responsibilities with the State Secretariat and the Cabinet Secretary. Large size of UKP4 also considered, as its size was quite comparable to a size of a coordinating ministry and Widodo intention to make the bureaucracy much slimmer. Due to this, in Joko Widodo period, there were no presidential fixers. Joko Widodo was relied on to the state internal audits from Financial and Development Supervisory Board and for much of his strategic works relied on the inputs from Executive Office of the President of the Republic of Indonesia strategists and researchers.

Under Prabowo Subianto administration, presidential fixers are revived in form of Bappisus. Unlike the previous preceding agencies, Bappisus much involved in rapid, hands-on approaches in fixing.

== Organization ==
Based on Presidential Decree No. 159/2024, the Agency for Development Control and Special Investigation is institutionally independent but reports to the president through the Ministry of the State Secretariat. The agency is organized into the following:

- Office of the Chief of the Agency for Development Control and Special Investigation
- Agency Secretariat
- Deputy for Supervisory and Control
- Deputy for Monitoring and Investigation
