= Presidential Communication Office =

Indonesian government agency

- Kantor Komunikasi Kepresidenan

Agency overview
- Formed: 15 August 2024
- Preceding agencies: Presidential Spokesperson; Deputy IV of the Executive Office of the President of the Republic of Indonesia
- Dissolved: 17 September 2025
- Superseding agency: Government Communications Agency
- Jurisdiction: Indonesia
- Agency executive: Hasan Nasbi, Chief

The Presidential Communication Office (Indonesian: Kantor Komunikasi Presiden, official abbreviation PCO) was a cabinet-level agency tasked to coordinate and deliver presidential messages and communication and to convey official comments on behalf of the president.

This office was replacement for the office of Presidential Spokesperson of the Republic of Indonesia.

This office was the only state agency in Indonesia that using English name rather Indonesian name in official documents. Even inside Indonesia, the office was referred as Presidential Communication Office or its abbreviation, PCO. This was because the request of Hasan Nasbi, that disliked the office he led to be abbreviated and known as Kompres.

ANTARA, Indonesian news agency used PCO to refer the office. Several news publishers also followed ANTARA suits to refer the agency as PCO.

The agency disbanded on 17 September 2025, and all its responsibilities transferred to the Government Communications Agency.

== History ==
In the past, since the inception of the presidency, Indonesian presidents have relied on a presidential spokesperson (or, sometimes, multiple spokespersons) to convey their messages to the public. However, presidential spokespersons have often been overwhelmed, as their office has essentially operated as a one-person operation with limited human resources, while also being responsible for explaining numerous issues and policies to the public.

Last occupant of the Presidential Spokesperson office was Fadjroel Rachman, which was terminated on 26 October 2021, by his appointment as Indonesian Ambassador to Kazakhstan. The office later returned to Joko Widodo.

On 15 August 2024, Joko Widodo signed the Presidential Decree No. 82/2024, forming the formalized agency to organize state spokespersons. This agency actually was result of Prabowo's deal with Joko Widodo administration, making this agency was one of two Prabowo's incoming administration that activated earlier before his administration started.

On 19 August 2024, Hasan Nasbi appointed as Chief of the Presidential Communication Office. He was Prabowo-Gibran campaign spokesperson. He expected that in the future, when the office fully functional during Prabowo's tenure, the office will employ 5 to 6 presidential spokespersons. As the seed of the office, Deputy IV (Information and Political Communication) of the Executive Office of the President of the Republic of Indonesia (KSP) was taken out from the KSP.

The agency disbanded on 17 September 2025 in favor of the Government Communications Agency. This is due to the need of better political communication between the central government to the regional governments.

== Structure ==
Based on Presidential Decree No. 82/2024, the office consisted of:

- Office of the Chief of the Presidential Communication Office
- Deputy for Communication and Information Material
- Deputy for Dissemination and Information Media
- Deputy for Information Coordination and Communication Evaluation
- Presidential Spokespersons
