= Lake Toba Authority Implementing Agency =

Government agency of Indonesia

- Badan Pelaksana Otorita Danau Toba
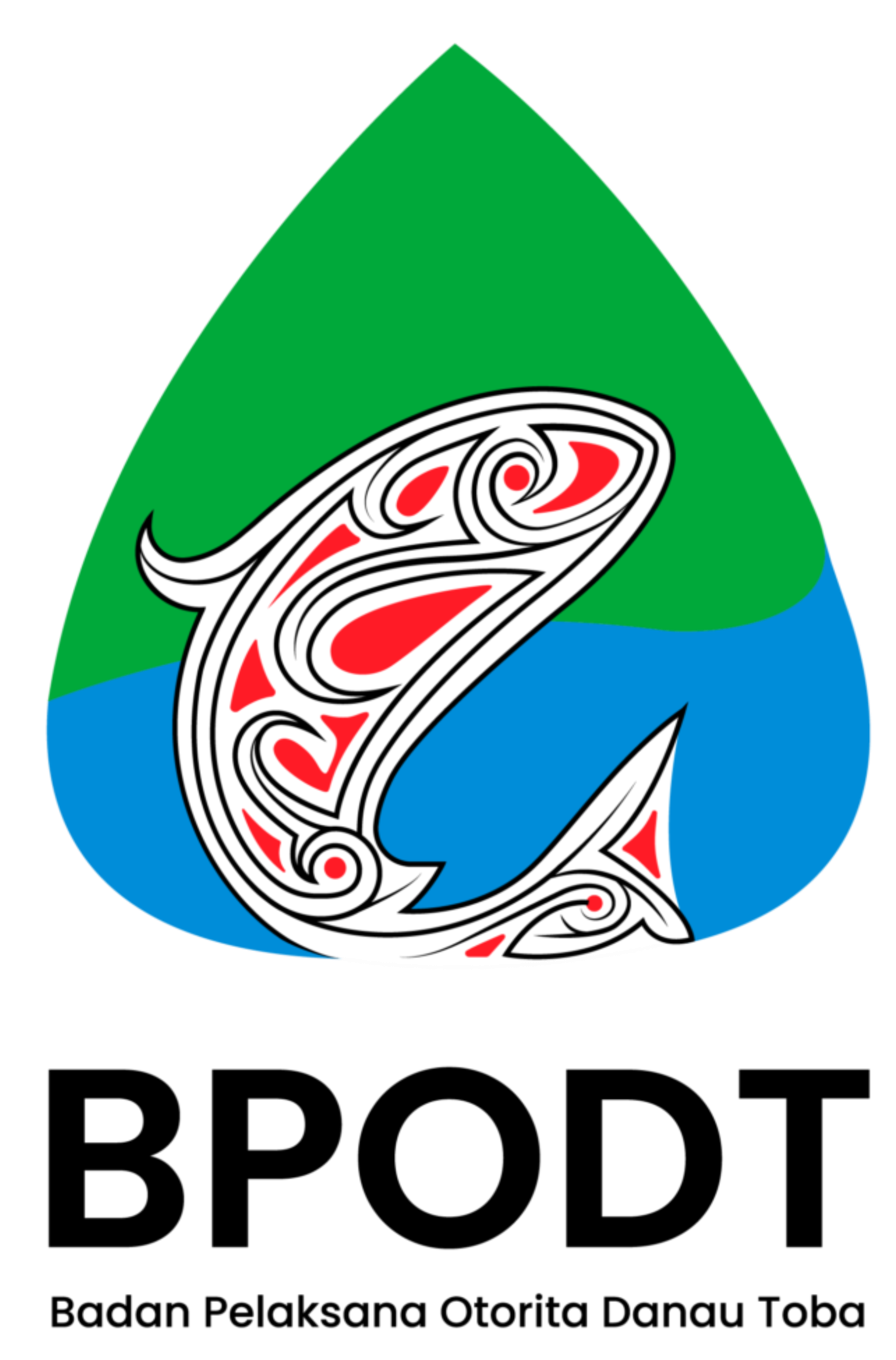

Agency overview
- Formed: 2016
- Headquarters: Darat Subdistrict, Medan Baru District, Medan, North Sumatra, Indonesia
- Agency executive: Jimmy Bernando Panjaitan, President Director
- Key document: Presidential Regulation No. 49 of 2016
- Website: www.bpodt.id

The Lake Toba Authority Implementing Agency (Indonesian: Badan Pelaksana Otorita Danau Toba; BPODT) is a public service government agency established by the government of Indonesia to manage the development of Lake Toba as a premier tourism destination.

== Description ==
The agency's formation was based on Presidential Regulation No. 49 of 2016. Tasked with improving infrastructure, tourism, and environmental conservation in the area, the BPODT operates under the Ministry of Tourism and coordinates closely with the Coordinating Minister for Maritime Affairs. It is accountable to the president of Indonesia.

The BPODT has the dual mission of: 1) Directly managing development within the 500-hectare designated Lake Toba Tourism Authority Zone through planning, building, and regulating tourism activities, and 2) Coordinating and facilitating tourism-related efforts across the broader Lake Toba Coordinative Zone, which encompasses eight regencies in North Sumatra in total: Toba, Simalungun, Samosir, Humbang Hasundutan, North Tapanuli, Dairi, Karo, and Pakpak Bharat; general governance and local issues remain under the control of regional and regency governments. To turn Lake Toba into a top tourism spot, the agency requires a budget of 21 trillion Rupiah (US$1.3 billion).

The BPODT's exercise of authority has faced significant criticism by indigenous communities who raised concerns about being excluded from the development process, viewing the agency's projects as unilateral decisions not taking into account their perspectives or traditions. Lands previously recognized as belonging to indigenous communities have been repurposed under the agency's authority, using Presidential Regulation No. 49 of 2016 as legal basis, leading to land ownership disputes.
