= Abdul Kadir Karding =

Indonesian politician (born 1973)

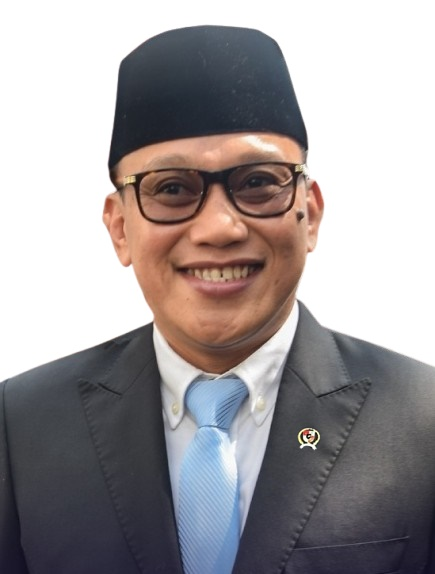

Minister of Migrant Workers Protection
- In office 21 October 2024 – 8 September 2025
- President: Prabowo Subianto
- Deputy: Christina Aryani; Dzulfikar Tawalla
- Preceded by: Office established
- Succeeded by: Mukhtarudin

5th head of Indonesian Migrant Workers Protection Board
- In office 21 October 2024 – 8 September 2025
- President: Prabowo Subianto
- Deputy: Christina Aryani; Dzulfikar Tawalla
- Preceded by: Benny Rhamdani
- Succeeded by: Mukhtarudin

Personal details
- Born: 25 March 1973 (age 53) Donggala, Central Sulawesi, Indonesia
- Party: PKB

Abdul Kadir Karding (born 25 March 1973) is an Indonesian politician of the National Awakening Party serving as Minister of Migrant Workers Protection since 2024. From 2009 to 2024, he was a member of the House of Representatives.
