= Ministry of Hajj and Umrah (Indonesia) =

Government ministry of Indonesia

- Kementerian Haji dan Umrah

Agency overview
- Formed: 21 June 1965; 61 years ago (first iteration); 8 September 2025; 11 months ago
- Preceding agencies: Hajj Management Authority; Directorate General of Hajj and Umrah, Ministry of Religious Affairs; Center for Hajj Health, Ministry of Health
- Jurisdiction: Government of Indonesia
- Headquarters: Jl. M.H. Thamrin No.6 2, RT.2/RW.1, Kebon Sirih, Menteng, Central Jakarta, Jakarta
- Minister responsible: Mochamad Irfan Yusuf, Minister of Hajj and Umrah
- Agency executive: Dahnil Anzar Simanjuntak, Deputy Minister of Hajj and Umrah
- Parent department: Coordinating Ministry for Human Development and Cultural Affairs
- Website: www.haji.go.id

The Ministry of Hajj and Umrah (Indonesian: Kementerian Haji dan Umrah) is a ministry within the executive government that is under and responsible to the President of Indonesia. This ministry is tasked with organizing the Hajj and Umrah pilgrimages in accordance with statutory provisions. This ministry is an upgrade of the Hajj Management Authority and a merger of the authority of the Directorate General of Hajj and Umrah Organization from the Ministry of Religious Affairs of the Republic of Indonesia.

It is only one among two kinds of such ministry in the world after the Saudi Arabian Ministry of Hajj and Umrah, and also the 49th ministry of the Red and White Cabinet.

== History ==
The nomenclature of Hajj affairs was initially in the Department of Home Affairs (now the Ministry of Home Affairs) in 1945. Then Hajj and mosque affairs were transferred to the Department of Religious Affairs in 1946. In 1950, Department of Religious Affairs formed Hajj Division under its secretariat. Until 1963, Hajj affairs managed by this small division until it elevated to a bureau-level, Hajj Bureau. The Hajj Bureau was then upgraded to the ministry-level Department of Hajj Affairs in 1965 during Dwikora Cabinet. Department of Hajj Affairs was subordinate of the coordinating ministry-level Compartment Ministry of Religious Affairs (elevation of the Department of Religious Affairs), until 1966, when the Department of Hajj was merged to the then-simplified Department of Religious Affairs during Ampera Cabinet.

At its brief existence in 1965-1966 period, Department of Hajj Affairs was led by Prof. Farid Ma'ruf, a Muhammadiyah ulama previously trained at Nahdlatul Ulama affiliated pesantren Tremas Pesantren and Al-Irshad Al-Islamiya schools, and a graduate of Al-Azhar University. Despite only existed for 1 year, the department under Ma'ruf ministry successfully established the foundation of the state-run hajj services. The department responsibilities re-assumed by Department of Religious Affairs on 25 July 1966, and Department of Hajj Affairs converted to Directorate General of Hajj Affairs, with Ma'ruf then become its director general. Directorate General of Hajj Affairs retained until 1978, when it briefly subsumed to the Directorate General of Islamic Community Guidance forming the Directorate General of Islamic Community Guidance and Hajj Affairs only to be absorbed fully as the Directorate General of Islamic Community Guidance in 1979. Then in 2006, Hajj affairs were separated again from the Directorate of Islamic Community Guidance, and a new directorate general was formed with Umrah affairs added, forming Directorate General of Hajj and Umrah.

Subsequently, in 2024, a special agency was established to manage Hajj affairs, called Hajj Management Authority, with most of its duties and functions transferred from the Directorate General of Hajj and Umrah. The directorate general's functions were then fully transferred after the Ministry of Hajj and Umrah was established in August 2025.

On 8 September 2025, the Ministry of Hajj and Umrah officially formed by inauguration of the minister and deputy minister. Mochamad Irfan Yusuf and Dahnil Anzar Simanjuntak elevated from their posts as Minister and Deputy Minister of Hajj and Umrah.

Around "more than 200" employees of the formerly Directorate General of Hajj and Umrah of the Ministry of Religious Affairs and 50 employees of the Ministry of Health will be transferred to the new ministry, joining the former Hajj Management Authority to become the part of the new ministry. Some attorneys of the Attorney General also moved to the ministry, along with former other ministerial staffs of various ministries and become part of first 400 ministry employees.

During celebration of 100-years anniversary of Nahdlatul Ulama in Malang, President Prabowo Subianto announced that Indonesia will have an extraterritorial hajj lodging facility near Makkah, which will be managed jointly by the ministry and Danantara. The extraterritorial facility, Kampung Haji Indonesia, currently in construction.

== Organization ==
Based on Presidential Decree No. 92/2025 and Ministry of Hajj and Umrah Decree No. 1/2025, No. 2/2025, and No. 1/2026, the ministry consisted of:

- Office of the Minister of Hajj and Umrah
- Office of the Deputy Minister of Hajj and Umrah
- General Secretary
  - Bureau of Planning
  - Bureau of Finance and State Properties
  - Bureau of Organization and Human Resources
  - Bureau of Legal Affairs and Partnerships
  - Bureau of General Affairs
  - Bureau of Public Relations
- General Directorate of Hajj and Umrah Management Fostering (General Directorate I)
  - Directorate of Regular Hajj Pilgrims Fostering
    - Sub-directorate of Hajj and Umrah Ritual Services Fostering
    - Sub-directorate of Hajj and Umrah Guidance Institutions (Kelompok Bimbingan Haji dan Umrah, KBIHU) Institutional Fostering
  - Directorate of Regular Hajj Officers Fostering
    - Sub-directorate of Hajj Officers Preparations, Mapping, and Recruitment
    - Sub-directorate of Hajj Officers Administration Services and Performance Appraisal
  - Directorate of Umrah and Special Pilgrims Fostering
    - Sub-directorate of Special Hajj Fostering
    - Sub-directorate of Umrah Fostering
  - Directorate of Licensing and Accreditation for Special Hajj and Umrah
    - Sub-directorate of Licensing and Accreditation of Special Hajj
    - Sub-directorate of Licensing and Accreditation of Umrah
- General Directorate of Hajj Services Coordination (General Directorate II)
  - Directorate of Domestic Hajj Services
    - Sub-directorate of Hajj Registration and Cancellation
    - Sub-directorate of Hajj Documents and Equipment
    - Sub-directorate of Hajj Accommodation and Consumption
    - Sub-directorate of Hajj Transportation
  - Directorate of Foreign Hajj Services
    - Sub-directorate of Hajj Accommodation
    - Sub-directorate of Hajj Consumption
    - Sub-directorate of Hajj Transportation
  - Directorate of Special Hajj Services
    - Sub-directorate of Special Hajj Registration and Cancellation
    - Sub-directorate of Special Hajj Documents and Equipment
- General Directorate of Hajj and Umrah Economic Ecosystem Development (General Directorate III)
  - Directorate of Partnership Facilitation for Development of Hajj and Umrah Economic Ecosystem
    - Sub-directorate of Partnership Facilitation for Development of Hajj and Umrah Economic Ecosystem
    - Sub-directorate of Infrastructure Facilitation for Development of Hajj and Umrah Economic Ecosystem
  - Directorate of Standardization and Empowerment Facilitation for Development of Hajj and Umrah Economic Ecosystem
    - Sub-directorate of Standardization of Hajj and Umrah Economic Ecosystem
    - Sub-directorate of Empowerment Facilitation for Development of Hajj and Umrah Economic Ecosystem
  - Directorate of Hajj Operational Funding Management
    - Sub-directorate of Planning of Hajj Operational Funding and Hajj Assets Management
    - Sub-directorate of Execution of Hajj Operational Funding
- General Directorate of Hajj and Umrah Management Control (General Directorate IV)
  - Directorate of Special Hajj and Umrah Monitoring
    - Sub-directorate of Special Hajj Monitoring
    - Sub-directorate of Umrah Monitoring
    - Sub-directorate of Special Hajj and Umrah Law Enforcement
  - Directorate of Regular Hajj Monitoring
    - Sub-directorate of Regular Hajj Services Monitoring
    - Sub-directorate of Hajj and Umrah Guidance Institutions Monitoring
    - Sub-directorate of Regular Hajj Law Enforcement
- General Inspectorate
  - General Inspectorate Secretariat
  - Inspectorate I (Internal supervision of General Directorate I and regional offices at Aceh, Riau Islands, Bangka Belitung, West Java, Bali, Central Kalimantan, North Sulawesi Utara, South Sulawesi, and Papua Provinces)
  - Inspectorate II (Internal supervision of General Directorate II and regional offices at North Sumatera, Jambi, Lampung, Central Java, West Nusa Tenggara, South Kalimantan, Gorontalo, Suth East Sulawesi, and West Papua Provinces)
  - Inspectorate III (Internal supervision of General Secretariat, General Directorate III, and regional offices at West Sumatera, South Sumatera, Banten, Yogyakarta, East Nusa Tenggara, East Kalimantan including Nusantara, Central Sulawesi, Maluku Provinces)
  - Inspectorate IV (Internal supervision of General Inspectorate, General Directorate IV, and regional offices at Riau, Bengkulu, Jakarta, East Java, West Kalimantan, North Kalimantan, West Sulawesi, and North Maluku Provinces)
- Board of Experts
  - Expert Staff for Management and Public Services Transformation
  - Expert Staff for Institutional Relations
- Centers
  - Center for Data, Technology, and Information
  - Center for Hajj Health
  - Center for Human Resource Development
- Regional Hajj and Umrah Organizations
  - Type "A" Center-level Offices
    - Aceh Regional Office for Hajj and Umrah, Banda Aceh
      - 23 Institute-level Regency/Municipal Offices for Hajj and Umrah (1 Type "A" Institute, 14 Type "B" Institutes, 8 Type "C" Institutes)
    - North Sumatera Regional Office for Hajj and Umrah, Medan
      - 23 Institute-level Regency/Municipal Offices for Hajj and Umrah (1 Type "A" Institute, 9 Type "B" Institutes, 13 Type "C" Institutes)
    - West Sumatera Regional Office for Hajj and Umrah, Padang
      - 18 Institute-level Regency/Municipal Offices for Hajj and Umrah (1 Type "A" Institute, 7 Type "B" Institutes, 10 Type "C" Institutes)
    - Riau Regional Office for Hajj and Umrah, Pekanbaru
      - 12 Institute-level Regency/Municipal Offices for Hajj and Umrah (2 Type "A" Institutes, 8 Type "B" Institutes, 2 Type "C" Institutes)
    - South Sumatera Regional Office for Hajj and Umrah, Palembang
      - 16 Institute-level Regency/Municipal Offices for Hajj and Umrah (1 Type "A" Institute, 9 Type "B" Institutes, 6 Type "C" Institutes)
    - Banten Regional Office for Hajj and Umrah, Serang
      - 8 Institute-level Regency/Municipal Offices for Hajj and Umrah (5 Type "A" Institutes, 3 Type "B" Institutes)
    - Jakarta Regional Office for Hajj and Umrah, Jakarta
      - 6 Institute-level Regency/Municipal Offices for Hajj and Umrah (5 Type "A" Institutes, 1 Type "B" Institute)
    - West Java Regional Office for Hajj and Umrah, Bandung
      - 27 Institute-level Regency/Municipal Offices for Hajj and Umrah (12 Type "A" Institutes, 13 Type "B" Institutes, 2 Type "C" Institutes)
    - Central Java Regional Office for Hajj and Umrah, Semarang
      - 35 Institute-level Regency/Municipal Offices for Hajj and Umrah (20 Type "A" Institutes, 14 Type "B" Institutes, 1 Type "C" Institute)
    - Yogyakarta Regional Office for Hajj and Umrah, Yogyakarta
      - 5 Institute-level Regency/Municipal Offices for Hajj and Umrah (3 Type "A" Institutes, 2 Type "B" Institutes)
    - East Java Regional Office for Hajj and Umrah, Surabaya
      - 38 Institute-level Regency/Municipal Offices for Hajj and Umrah (21 Type "A" Institutes, 14 Type "B" Institutes, 3 Type "C" Institutes)
    - West Nusa Tenggara Regional Office for Hajj and Umrah, Mataram
      - 10 Institute-level Regency/Municipal Offices for Hajj and Umrah (1 Type "A" Institute, 5 Type "B" Institutes, 4 Type "C" Institutes)
    - South Kalimantan Regional Office for Hajj and Umrah, Banjarmasin
      - 13 Institute-level Regency/Municipal Offices for Hajj and Umrah (1 Type "A" Institute, 10 Type "B" Institutes, 2 Type "C" Institutes)
    - East Kalimantan Regional Office for Hajj and Umrah, Samarinda
      - 9 Institute-level Regency/Municipal Offices for Hajj and Umrah (2 Type "A" Institutes, 6 Type "B" Institutes, 1 Type "C" Institute)
    - South Sulawesi Regional Office for Hajj and Umrah, Makassar
      - 24 Institute-level Regency/Municipal Offices for Hajj and Umrah (7 Type "A" Institutes, 12 Type "B" Institutes, 5 Type "C" Institutes)
  - Type "B" Center-level Offices
    - Jambi Regional Office for Hajj and Umrah, Kota Jambi
      - 11 Institute-level Regency/Municipal Offices for Hajj and Umrah (1 Type "A" Institute, 7 Type "B" Institutes, 3 Type "C" Institutes)
    - Riau Islands Regional Office for Hajj and Umrah, Tanjung Pinang
      - 7 Institute-level Regency/Municipal Offices for Hajj and Umrah (1 Type "A" Institute, 2 Type "B" Institutes, 4 Type "C" Institutes)
    - Bangka Belitung Regional Office for Hajj and Umrah, Pangkal Pinang
      - 7 Institute-level Regency/Municipal Offices for Hajj and Umrah (3 Type "B" Institutes, 4 Type "C" Institutes)
    - Bengkulu Regional Office for Hajj and Umrah, Kota Bengkulu
      - 10 Institute-level Regency/Municipal Offices for Hajj and Umrah (1 Type "B" Institutes, 9 Type "C" Institutes)
    - Lampung Regional Office for Hajj and Umrah, Bandar Lampung
      - 15 Institute-level Regency/Municipal Offices for Hajj and Umrah (1 Type "A" Institute, 10 Type "B" Institutes, 4 Type "C" Institutes)
    - Bali Regional Office for Hajj and Umrah, Denpasar
      - 8 Institute-level Regency/Municipal Offices for Hajj and Umrah (1 Type "A" Institute, 7 Type "B" Institutes)
    - East Nusa Tenggara Regional Office for Hajj and Umrah, Kupang
      - 10 Institute-level Regency/Municipal Offices for Hajj and Umrah (1 Type "B" Institute, 9 Type "C" Institutes)
    - West Kalimantan Regional Office for Hajj and Umrah, Pontianak
      - 14 Institute-level Regency/Municipal Offices for Hajj and Umrah (1 Type "A" Institute, 2 Type "B" Institutes, 11 Type "C" Institutes)
    - Central Kalimantan Regional Office for Hajj and Umrah, Palangkaraya
      - 13 Institute-level Regency/Municipal Offices for Hajj and Umrah (3 Type "B" Institutes, 10 Type "C" Institutes)
    - North Kalimantan Regional Office for Hajj and Umrah, Tanjung Selor
      - 4 Institute-level Regency/Municipal Offices for Hajj and Umrah (3 Type "B" Institutes, 1 Type "C" Institute)
    - North Sulawesi Regional Office for Hajj and Umrah, Manado
      - 7 Institute-level Regency/Municipal Offices for Hajj and Umrah (7 Type "C" Institutes)
    - Gorontalo Regional Office for Hajj and Umrah, Pontianak
      - 6 Institute-level Regency/Municipal Offices for Hajj and Umrah (2 Type "B" Institutes, 4 Type "C" Institutes)
    - Central Sulawesi Regional Office for Hajj and Umrah, Pontianak
      - 13 Institute-level Regency/Municipal Offices for Hajj and Umrah (4 Type "B" Institutes, 9 Type "C" Institutes)
    - West Sulawesi Regional Office for Hajj and Umrah, Mamuju
      - 6 Institute-level Regency/Municipal Offices for Hajj and Umrah (2 Type "B" Institutes, 4 Type "C" Institutes)
    - Central Sulawesi Regional Office for Hajj and Umrah, Kendari
      - 16 Institute-level Regency/Municipal Offices for Hajj and Umrah (1 Type "A" Institute, 3 Type "B" Institutes, 12 Type "C" Institutes)
    - Maluku Regional Office for Hajj and Umrah, Ambon
      - 9 Institute-level Regency/Municipal Offices for Hajj and Umrah (1 Type "B" Institute, 8 Type "C" Institutes)
    - South Maluku Regional Office for Hajj and Umrah, Ambon
      - 10 Institute-level Regency/Municipal Offices for Hajj and Umrah (1 Type "B" Institute, 9 Type "C" Institutes)
    - Papua Regional Office for Hajj and Umrah, Jayapura (serving Papua, South Papua, Central Papua, and Highland Papua Provinces)
      - 11 Institute-level Regency/Municipal Offices for Hajj and Umrah (1 Type "B" Institute, 10 Type "C" Institutes)
    - West Papua Regional Office for Hajj and Umrah, Sorong (serving West Papua and Southwest Papua Provinces)
      - 8 Institute-level Regency/Municipal Offices for Hajj and Umrah (8 Type "C" Institutes)
- Hajj Embarkation Centers
  - Aceh Class I Hajj Embarkation Center, Banda Aceh
  - Medan Class I Hajj Embarkation Center, Medan
  - Padang Class I Hajj Embarkation Center, Padang
  - Pondok Gede Class I Hajj Embarkation Center, Jakarta
    - Lampung Hajj Embarkation Branch Unit, Bandar Lampung
    - Jambi Hajj Embarkation Branch Unit, Jambi
    - Bangka Tengah Hajj Embarkation Branch Unit, Bangka Tengah
  - Bekasi Class I Hajj Embarkation Center, South Bekasi
    - Indramayu Hajj Embarkation Branch Unit, Indramayu
  - Sukolilo Class I Hajj Embarkation Center, Surabaya
  - Banjarmasin Class I Hajj Embarkation Center, Banjarmasin
    - Palangkaraya Hajj Embarkation Branch Unit, Palangkaraya
    - Pontianak Hajj Embarkation Branch Unit, Pontianak
  - Balikpapan Class I Hajj Embarkation Center, Balikpapan
    - Tarakan Hajj Embarkation Branch Unit, Tarakan
    - Palu Hajj Embarkation Branch Unit, Palu
  - Makassar Class I Hajj Embarkation Center, Makassar
    - Kendari Hajj Embarkation Branch Unit, Kendari
    - Manado Hajj Embarkation Branch Unit, Manado
    - Mamuju Hajj Embarkation Branch Unit, Mamuju
    - Sorong Hajj Embarkation Branch Unit, Sorong
    - Jayapura Hajj Embarkation Branch Unit, Jayapura
  - Lombok Class I Hajj Embarkation Center, Mataram
    - Kupang Hajj Embarkation Branch Unit, Kupang
  - Tangerang Class I Hajj Embarkation Center, Tangerang
  - Semarang Class I Hajj Embarkation Center, Semarang
  - Sleman Class I Hajj Embarkation Center, Sleman
  - Bengkulu Class II Hajj Embarkation Center, Bengkulu
  - Gorontalo Class II Hajj Embarkation Center, Gorontalo
  - Ternate Class II Hajj Embarkation Center, Ternate
  - Ambon Class II Hajj Embarkation Center, Ambon
- Extraterritorial Facility
  - Kampung Haji Indonesia, Makkah

== Gallery ==
Seal of Ministry of Hajj and Umrah (September–December 2025)

Seal of Ministry of Hajj and Umrah (Desember 2025 – present)
