= Waqf Agency =

Government agency of Indonesia

Waqf Agency of Indonesia
- Badan Wakaf Indonesia
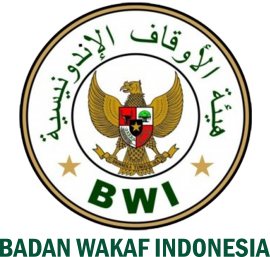

Agency overview
- Formed: 2004
- Headquarters: Jakarta, Indonesia
- Agency executives: Head of Advisory Council, Kamaruddin Amin; Head of Executive Board, Mohammad NUH
- Parent department: Ministry of Religious Affairs
- Website: www.bwi.go.id

The Waqf Agency of Indonesia (Indonesian: Badan Wakaf Indonesia; BWI) is an independent non-structural agency in Indonesia responsible for advancing and developing waqf activities (Islamic endowment) within the country. The realization of Law no. 41 concerning Waqf, the government body's functions include overseeing the management of waqf assets on a national and international scale, providing regulatory approvals regarding how assets are used, advising the government on related policies, and promoting public participation in waqf for the greater benefit of the public.

== Organizational Structure ==
The Waqf Agency of Indonesia consists of the Advisory Council, which oversees task implementation, and the executive board, responsible for executing said tasks. The board is led by a chairman and two vice-chairmen, elected by the members. The membership, appointed and dismissed by the president, serve a three-year term and can be reappointed for an additional term. Initial appointments are proposed by the Minister of Religious Affairs with subsequent proposals being handled by a selection committee of the BWI. Membership is at minimum 20 members and at maximum 30 members.

The agency is divided into five divisions, namely:

1. Division of Cooperation, Institutional Affairs, and Advocacy.
2. Division of Public Relations, Outreach, and Literacy.
3. Division of Data Collection, Legislation, and Asset Exchange.
4. Division of Governance Oversight.
5. Division of Nazhir Empowerment and Asset Management.

== Members ==
The current members of the Advisory Council and executive board, serving the 2021-2024 period, is as follows:

=== Advisory Council ===
- Chairperson: Kamaruddin Amin
- Member: H. Nizar Ali
- Member: Tarmizi Tohor
- Member: Gatot Abdullah Mansyur
- Member: Imam Teguh Saptono

=== Executive Board ===
- Chairperson: Mohammad NUH
- Vice-chair I: Imam Teguh Saptono
- Vice-chair II: Yuli Yasin
- Secretary: Sarmidi Husna
- Deputy Secretary: Emmy Hamidiyah
- Treasurer: Mochammad Sukron
- Deputy Treasurer: Hafiz Gaffar
