= National Police Commission (Indonesia) =

- Komisi Kepolisian Nasional

Agency overview
- Formed: 2005
- Headquarters: Jakarta, Indonesia
- Annual budget: Funded through the state budget (APBN)
- Key document: Presidential Regulation No. 17 of 2005, Presidential Regulation No. 17 of 2011
- Website: www.kompolnas.go.id

The National Police Commission (Indonesian: Komisi Kepolisian Nasional; Kompolnas) is the national police oversight body in Indonesia. Operating as a non-structural state institution, the commission is directly accountable to the president of Indonesia. It is funded through the state budget.

== Powers & Duties ==
Established through Presidential Regulation No. 17 of 2005 by then-President Susilo Bambang Yudhoyono (SBY), the commission is tasked with overseeing, monitoring, and assessing the performance and integrity of the Indonesian National Police (POLRI), as outlined in Article 3. Additionally, the commission assists the president in setting the strategic direction of the POLRI and gives counsel on the appointment and dismissal of the National Police Chief, as outlined in Article 4. Over time, regulations were updated with Presidential Regulation No. 17 of 2011 on March 4, to better meet the needs for professionalism, accountability, and independence within the commission.

The commission holds the authority to gather and analyze data on POLRI budget allocation, human resources, and infrastructure, to make informed recommendations to the president. It also proposes improvements to professionalism and independence within the police force. Lastly, the commission processes public complaints regarding police conduct (e.g. corruption, abuse of power, discrimination), forwarding these to the president.

== Membership ==
The commission is composed of nine members: three ex-officio government representatives (i.e. Coordinating Minister for Political, Legal, and Security Affairs, the Minister of Home Affairs, and the Minister of Law and Human Rights), three police experts, and three public representatives. These members serve in designated roles, including chairperson, vice-chairperson, and secretary.
