= Borobudur Authority Agency =

Government agency of Indonesia

- Badan Otorita Borobudur

Agency overview
- Formed: 2018
- Jurisdiction: Borobudur, Magelang, Yogyakarta, Surakarta, Salatiga, Semarang
- Headquarters: Yogyakarta, Special Region of Yogyakarta, Indonesia
- Agency executive: Agustin Peranginangin, President Director
- Key document: Presidential Regulation on the Establishment of the Borobudur Tourism Authority Agency
- Website: bob.kemenparekraf.go.id

The Borobudur Authority Agency (Indonesian: Badan Otorita Borobudur; BOB) is the government agency responsible for managing and promoting tourism, cultural heritage, and sustainable economic development around the UNESCO-designated World Heritage Site Borobudur Temple and its surrounding regions. Formed in 2018, It is the realization of Presidential Regulation No. 46 of 2017 on the Establishment of the Borobudur Tourism Authority Agency. Besides overseeing the Borobudur Temple, several regions including Magelang, Yogyakarta, Surakarta, Salatiga, and Semarang, are under the agency's authority for matters relating to tourism. The agency operates under the Ministry of Tourism and is directly accountable to the President of Indonesia.

As part of the government's strategy to position the Borobudur Temple as a "Super Priority Tourism Destination", the Borobudur Authority Agency has developed a 309-hectare exclusive tourism area named the Borobudur Authority Zone. Located in the Purworejo Regency, Central Java Province, the development area was created with three main aims: boosting tourism, attracting foreign investment, and stimulating local economies.
