= Ministry of Indonesian Migrant Workers Protection =

Indonesian government ministry

Ministry of Indonesian Migrant Workers Protection/Indonesian Migrant Workers Protection Board
- Kementerian Pelindungan Pekerja Migran Indonesia/Badan Pelindungan Pekerja Migran Indonesia

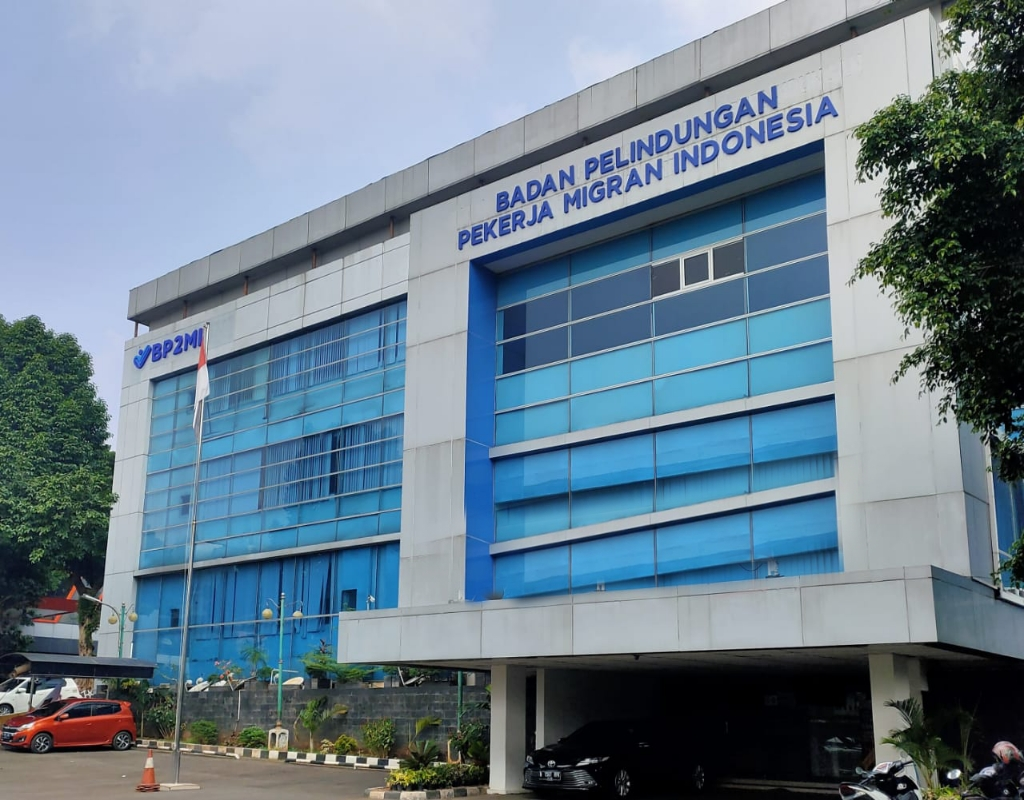
- Ministry of Indonesian Migrant Workers Protection/Indonesian Migrant Workers Protection Board headquarters

Ministry overview
- Formed: 21 October 2024; 22 months ago
- Preceding Ministry: Indonesian Migrant Workers Protection Board
- Jurisdiction: Government of Indonesia
- Headquarters: Jalan MT Haryono Kav 52, Pancoran, South Jakarta 12770
- Minister responsible: Mukhtarudin, Minister of Indonesian Migrant Workers Protection/ Indonesian Migrant Workers Protection Board
- Deputy Ministers responsible: Christina Aryani, First Deputy Minister of Indonesian Migrant Workers Protection/ Indonesian Migrant Workers Protection Board; Dzulfikar Ahmad Tawalla, Second Deputy Minister of Indonesian Migrant Workers Protection/ Indonesian Migrant Workers Protection Board
- Parent department: Coordinating Ministry for Social Empowerment
- Child agencies: Indonesian Migrant Workers Protection Service Center (23 units); Indonesian Migrant Workers Protection Service Post (25 units)
- Website: kp2mi.go.id

The Ministry of Indonesian Migrant Workers Protection/Indonesian Migrant Workers Protection Board (Indonesian: Kementerian Pelindungan Pekerja Migran Indonesia/Badan Pelindungan Pekerja Migran Indonesia, abbreviated as KemenP2MI/BP2MI), is a ministry that organizes the government's sub-division of Indonesian Migrant Workers protection which is within the scope of government affairs in the field of employment and the Indonesian Migrant Workers Protection Board is a Non-Ministerial Government Institution that carries out government duties in the field of protecting Indonesian Migrant Workers.

== History ==
During the administration of President Prabowo Subianto, a new Ministry was created called the Ministry of Protection of Indonesian Migrant Workers, so that since October 21, 2024, the Protection of Indonesian Migrant Workers has been under the auspices of the Minister of Protection of Migrant Workers. The position of Head of BP2MI is held by the Minister of Protection of Migrant Workers Abdul Kadir Karding.

== Organizational Structure ==
The organizational structure of the Ministry consists of:

- Office of the Minister of Indonesian Migrant Workers Protection/Indonesian Migrant Workers Protection Board
- Office of the Deputy Minister of Indonesian Migrant Workers Protection/Indonesian Migrant Workers Protection Board
- Office of the Secretariat General
- Directorate General of Promotion and Utilization of Overseas Work Opportunities
- Directorate General of Placement
- Directorate General of Protection
- Directorate General of Empowerment
- Inspectorate General
- Board of Experts
  - Senior Expert to the Minister for Digital Transformation
  - Senior Expert to the Minister for Inter-Institutional Relations

The structure of the technical echelon I organizational unit uses the structure of echelon I organizational unit at the Ministry of Protection of Indonesian Migrant Workers whose duties and functions are in accordance.

Based on the Regulation of the Indonesian Migrant Worker Protection Agency of the Republic of Indonesia number 6 of 2022, there are

- 23 units Indonesian Migrant Worker Protection Service Centers
  Balai Pelayanan Pelindungan Pekerja Migran Indonesia (BP3MI)
- 25 units Indonesian Migrant Worker Protection Service Posts
  Pos Pelayanan Pelindungan Pekerja Migran Indonesia (P4MI)
