= National Border Management Agency =

Indonesian border patrol government agency

- Badan Nasional Pengelola Perbatasan
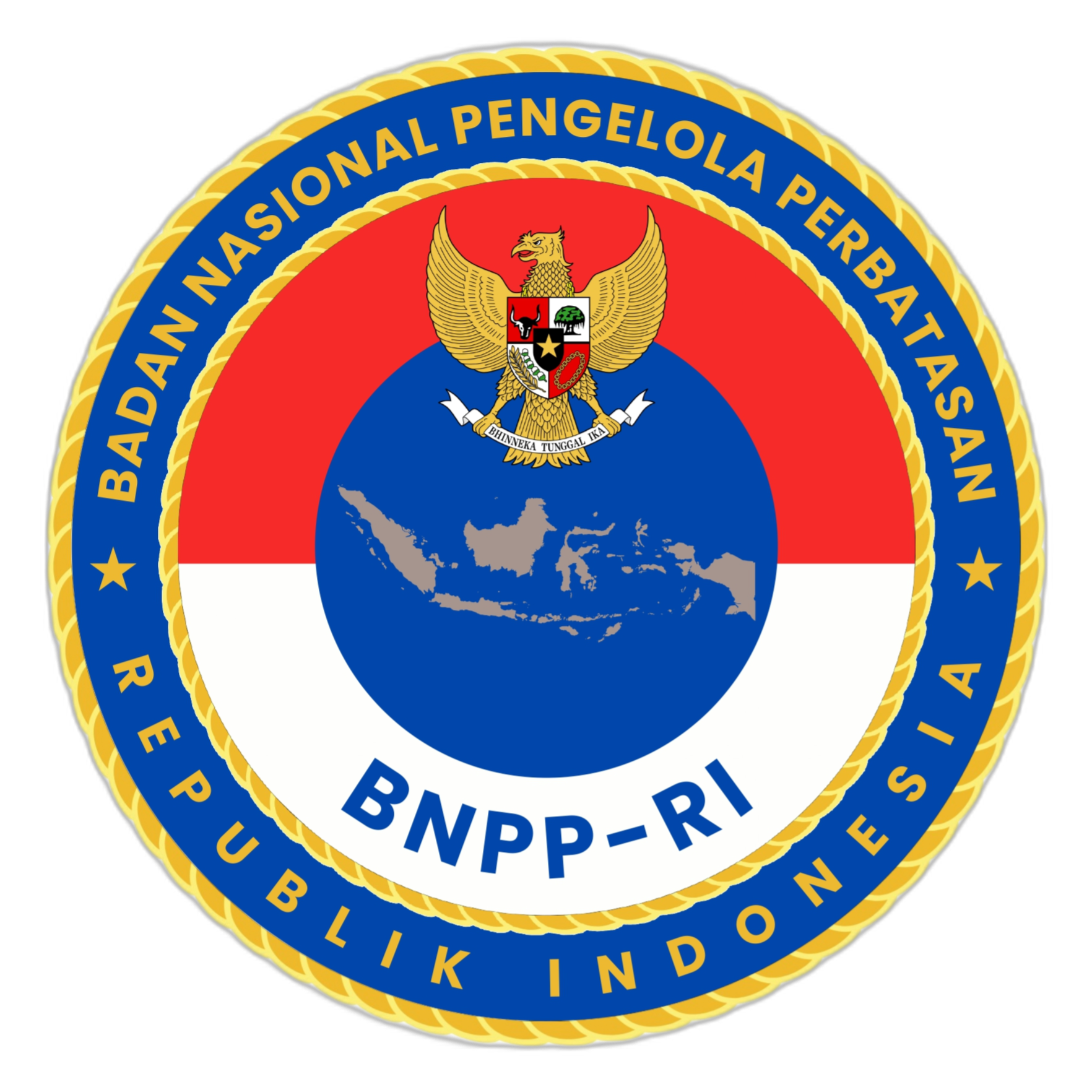

Agency overview
- Formed: 2010
- Headquarters: Jakarta Pusat, Jakarta, Indonesia
- Agency executives: Muhammad Tito Karnavian, Head of the BNPP; Coordinating Minister for Political, Legal, and Security Affairs, Chair of the BNPP
- Key document: Law No. 43 of 2008 concerning State Territory, Presidential Regulation No. 12 of 2010, Presidential Regulation No. 44 of 2017 (amendment to PR No.12/2010)
- Website: https://bnpp.go.id/

The National Border Management Agency (Indonesian: Badan Nasional Pengelola Perbatasan; BNPP) is an Indonesian government agency established in 2010 under Presidential Regulation No. 12, in accordance with the mandate of Law No. 43 of 2008 concerning State Territory. It is the government agency in Indonesia in charge of overseeing and coordinating border management efforts, developing policies that protect the country's vast borders, both land and maritime. However, the BNPP's authority is limited to budget planning, policy coordination, and evaluation duties rather than direct enforcement. Directly accountable to the president of Indonesia, its operational expenses are entirely covered by the state budget.

Operating under the president of Indonesia, the Minister of Home Affairs is designated as the Head of the BNPP while the Coordinating Minister for Political, Legal, and Security Affairs serves as the Chair of the BNPP. Both hold their positions within the agency by virtue of their existing government offices (ex-officio).

== Functions ==
The BNPP's core responsibilities include developing master and action plans for border area development, coordinating policy formulation for border management, overseeing the delineation, maintenance, and security of borders, assessing resources, and monitoring and reporting on the progress of development projects.

== Membership ==
BNPP membership consists of high-level officials from 18-20 different ministries and agencies, including the commander of the Indonesian National Armed Forces (TNI), the head of the State Intelligence Agency (BIN), the head of the National Counter Terrorism Agency, and the head of the National Narcotics Board. It also consists of 13 regional governors with border territories. Additionally, the agency is supported by a secretariat headed by a secretary and three deputies.
