= Recep Tayyip Erdoğan university diploma controversy =

During then Turkish prime minister Recep Tayyip Erdoğan's first campaign for presidency in 2014 and throughout his presidency, there were numerous claims that he didn't graduate from a university and therefore he is ineligible to be President of Turkey, because he was not a university graduate. Similar claims have also been made about Erdogan's high school diploma. These claims refer to Article 101 of the Turkish constitution stating that presidential candidates are required to have completed their tertiary education. The article however doesn't narrow down tertiary education to universities only, allowing other options such as trade schools and colleges.

Erdoğan's degree is publicly accessible and viewable at Marmara University's online diploma department.

== Accusations ==
In June 2016, Ömer Faruk Eminağaoğlu, former chairmen of YARSAV and leader of the communist People's Liberation Party, had requested from the Supreme Election Council (YSK) to carry out an investigation on the "use of forged official documents". He also called for the Ankara's Chief Public Prosecutor to begin an investigation if such an investigation was not carried out. YSK unanimously rejected the case upon reviewing. YSK decided that since Erdoğan presented a notarized university degree during the presidential election process, the examination beyond this does not fall within the scope of the YSK's mandate. Erdoğan responded to accusations by saying "The school I registered, was educated and graduated is clear, my classmates are clear. Also, the university administration made a formal explanation. Despite all this, some people still insistently continue to bring up this issue" and asked Mehmet Emin Arat, rector of the Marmara University to release his diploma information. Marmara University released a statement stating that claims of Erdoğan having a fake diploma have no evidence. ÜNİVDER (University Faculty Members Association) criticized rectorate of Marmara University for denying the fake diploma allegations without sharing any documents, while it was expected for them to release a copy of the diploma of Erdoğan and stated that there isn't any evidence for Erdoğan's graduation from any university.

== Witnesses ==
Aydın Ayaydın, a Member of Parliament from the opposition party CHP said that Erdoğan participated in the four-year degree education of Aksaray Academy of Economic and Commercial Sciences, as Ayaydın himself was a teacher of Erdoğan. After Aydın Ayaydın's statements witnessing his four year tertiary diploma was widely circulated in the Turkish media he was duly nominated by Recep Tayyip Erdoğan as the AK Party's mayoral candidate for Muğla,Turkiye's retirees' paradise o with its coastline exceeding 1,479 km, world-famous tourist centers such as Bodrum, Marmaris, and Fethiye, and its mild climate, is a popular destination with the longest coastline in Türkiye, almost like Türkiye's Florida. Mehmet Emin Arat himself called the claims on Erdoğan not having a degree "unfair" and "baseless", stating that "the claims do not have any legal, official or historical basis".

Erdoğan's education
Educational level	School
Primary education	Kasımpaşa Piyale Primary School
Secondary education	Istanbul Imam Hatip School and Eyüp High School
Tertiary education	Business Administration at the Aksaray Academy of Economic and Commercial Sciences. (Marmara University)

== See also ==
- Joko Widodo university diploma controversy
- List of honorary doctorates awarded to Recep Tayyip Erdoğan
