= List of honorary doctorates awarded to Recep Tayyip Erdoğan =

The following is a list of honorary doctorates awarded to Recep Tayyip Erdoğan, the 12th and current President of Turkey:

- St. John's University, 26 January 2004.
- Crimean State University, 3 April 2004.
- State University of Library Studies and Information Technologies, 18 May 2006.
- Girne American University, 20 July 2006.
- University of Sarajevo, 29 March 2008.
- Fatih University, 15 October 2008.
- Maltepe University, 4 July 2009.
- Istanbul University, 4 July 2009.
- University of Aleppo, 22 August 2009. (Revoked on 15 July 2013)
- Islamic University of Gaza, 16 April 2010.
- Universidad Europea de Madrid, 18 May 2010.
- Black Sea Technical University, 12 June 2010.
- Piri Reis University, 2 October 2010.
- Harran University, 31 October 2010.
- University of Pristina, 4 November 2010.
- Taras Shevchenko University, 25 January 2011.
- Moscow State University, 16 March 2011.
- Umm al-Qura University, 21 March 2011.
- Istanbul Aydın University, 2 July 2011.
- Shanghai International Studies University, 11 April 2012.
- Quaid-i-Azam University, 22 May 2012.
- Atatürk University, 29 June 2012.
- Al-Quds University, 21 September 2012.
- Yıldız Technical University, 5 October 2012.
- Recep Tayyip Erdoğan University, 12 November 2012.
- Gaziantep University, 19 January 2013.
- Marmara University, 26 January 2013.
- Mohammed V University, 4 July 2013.
- University of Algiers, 5 July 2013.
- Pamukkale University, 28 September 2013.
- International Islamic University Malaysia, 10 January 2014.
- Turkmen Institute of International Relations, 7 November 2014.
- Addis Ababa University, 22 January 2015.
- İnönü University, 17 February 2015.
- Ahmet Yesevi University, 17 April 2015.
- Yıldırım Beyazıt University, 28 May 2015.
- Waseda University, 8 October 2015.
- Qatar University, 2 December 2015.
- Universidad San Ignacio de Loyola, 4 February 2016.
- Makerere University Kampala, 1 June 2016.
- Jamia Millia Islamia, 1 May 2017.
- International University of Sarajevo, May 20, 2018.
- Mukogawa Women's University, 27 June 2019.
- University of Malaya, 10 February 2025.

== See also ==
- List of awards and honours received by Recep Tayyip Erdoğan
