= October 2026 Indonesian protests =

- Part of the 2025–2026 Indonesian protests
- LMND protester during protest in front of DPR building; Protesters occupying the Heroes Monument on 20 October, depicts "They will fall when courage blooms!"
- Date: 4 October 2026 - present
- Location: Indonesia
- Caused by: 2026 Indonesia wildfires; Weakening of rupiah and economic hardship; Frustation over cost-of-living crisis; Energy crisis in Bali and Sumatra; Democratic backsliding during Prabowo Subianto's administration; Gibran Rakabuming Raka diploma controversy
- Goals: Resignation of Prabowo Subianto and his administration; Return to civil supremacy and cease the militarisation of Indonesia
- Methods: Sit-in; Online activism; Demonstrations
- Status: Ongoing

Parties
| (Indonesia) Protesters (no centralized authority): Students' unions; All-Indonesian Students' Union; National Students' League for Democracy; Indonesian Muslim Students' Movement; Labor unions; Grand Coalition for the Indonesian Labor Struggle; National Egg Producers Association; (Free Papua Movement) United Liberation Movement for West Papua | (Indonesia) Government; Indonesian National Police; Mobile Brigade Corps; Municipal Police; Indonesian Armed Forces; Indonesian Army; Military Police Corps; State Intelligence Agency; (Indonesia) Pro-government paramilitaries |

Since October 2026, a wave of major protests broke out in Indonesia since 5th October 2026 spearheaded by All-Indonesian Students' Union and the National Students' League for Democracy in front of DPR building Initially, the students demands revision and participatory deliberation of the National Education System Bill (RUU Sisdiknas), the implementation of free education, improvements to the welfare of teachers and educational staff, and guarantees for the survival and sustainability of private universities within the framework of a free education system. The trade union protest were followed the next day with 6,000 masses, united under the Grand Coalition for the Indonesian Labor Struggle (KBPBI), gathered in front of the Indonesian House of Representatives (DPR RI) building. This action was taken to oversee the plenary session and ensure that the substance of the final regulations truly favors the workers.

On 20 October, the unified protests consist of students, housewives, and trade unionists was held on two occasions, the 2nd anniversary of Prabowo Subianto's administration on 20 October and the 98th Youth Pledge Day on 28 October highlighting the 2026 Southeast Asian haze mismanagement which has caused health hazard in affected regions and deterioration of Indonesia's relations with its neighbouring countries. Overall, the protests spread to Aceh, Pekanbaru, Medan, Palembang, Jambi, Pontianak, Palangka Raya, Serang, Yogyakarta, Batam, Surabaya, Palopo, Malang, Bandung, Mamuju, Ambon, Kupang, Banjarmasin, Samarinda, and even as far as Jayapura.

== Background ==
Lines of motor vehicles waiting for fuel at Pertamina station in Bali during the fuel shortage

The difficulty in accessing energy persists and has even worsened. Long queues at gas stations have been reported in Bali, West Kalimantan, South Sulawesi, West Sulawesi, South Sumatra, North Sumatra, and Lampung, as well as in Malang and Jember, Aceh, West Java, Southeast Sulawesi, North Sulawesi, Banten, and West Papua. Meanwhile, a prolonged power outage occurred in Batam and Bintan, followed by the disruption of clean water services. Rolling blackouts also continue to occur in Banjarmasin, Bontang, Palangka Raya, and Balikpapan.

Demands for improvements to labor conditions in Indonesia are intensifying, in line with the drafting of a new bill on labor protection. In general, trade union were concerned that their demands—covering areas such as wages, working conditions, employment contracts, worker protections, and oversight—would not be accommodated in the bill; consequently, demonstrations persisted until the law was finally enacted on October 6, 2026. Following its enactment, workers planned to review the legislation, stage further protests, and pursue a judicial review. ...seek a review from the Constitutional Court if they believe any provisions are detrimental to them.

Concerns regarding a lack of transparency in Indonesian stock trading—specifically concerning share ownership and trading behavior—have led MSCI to announce plans to downgrade the status of the IDX Composite from "emerging market" to "standalone" by June 2027. This prompted a mass withdrawal of capital by foreign investors, causing the JCI to collapse to the 4,912 level, while the Indonesian Rupiah weakened to an exchange rate of 18,049. This is expected to increase the burden of state budget subsidies and cause the prices of goods to surge.

Various criticisms have been directed at the Prabowo's administration, which appears notably slow and reluctant to designate this event as a national disaster. This criticism has even come from politicians belonging to parties that support Prabowo—individuals who currently hold seats in the legislature. Indonesia itself was once designated as a country that produces ...the world's largest carbon emissions resulting from forest and land fires. On October 19, 2026, the Coordinating Minister for Political and Security Affairs, Dudung Abdurrahman, expressed full confidence—asserting that Indonesia remains capable of handling the situation—when asked why the government had not declared the events a national disaster or accepted foreign assistance. The government's communication style has also been perceived as defensive toward criticism, as evidenced by the remarks of Government Communication Agency official Syahganda Nainggolan in response to reproaches from neighboring countries. Rather than offering an apology—a gesture Indonesia has made in the past—he chose to point out that Indonesia has, in fact, frequently supplied oxygen to its neighbors. The remarks angered Singaporean and Malaysian public and officials causing a deterioration of bilateral relationship between Indonesia and its two neighbouring countries to the lowest point in the decade. This stance drew further condemnation from the government of Singapore. Meanwhile, Malaysian MP Kalam Salan issued a critical statement in the Javanese language, seemingly intended as a direct jab at the President of Indonesia.

=== Plummeting approval of Prabowo's administration ===
Several polling organizations indicate that the standing of the Prabowo administration continues to decline; for instance, the polling firm Arawicaksa found that only 50.1 percent of respondents expressed satisfaction with the Prabowo-Gibran government. SMRC presents even more concerning findings, showing that the proportion of the public who believe Indonesia is heading in the right direction has fallen to 48 percent two years into President Prabowo Subianto's administration. Celios also highlighted survey results indicating that 75 percent of respondents feel stressed by Prabowo's policies, while 67 percent report feeling stressed due to Prabowo's conduct. Meanwhile, Poltracking reports a satisfaction rate of 55.3 percent.

As a point of comparison, an INES survey from September 2026 indicated that 79.3 percent of respondents were satisfied with the Prabowo administration. Meanwhile, Piramida Research and Consulting reported in October that 60.4 percent of the public expressed satisfaction with Prabowo's performance. Meanwhile, LKPI stated that public satisfaction at the end of September 2026 reached 80.7 percent.

=== Indonesia's international image ===
The Economist discusses the waning influence of Prabowo's populism, noting that his support has plummeted from around 80 percent to approximately 45 percent. On the economic front, the Jakarta Composite Index (JCI) has slumped by as much as 40 percent, making it the worst-performing stock market in the world. While foreign investment is increasingly flowing into countries like Vietnam and Malaysia, Prabowo's policies have left investors reluctant to commit capital to Indonesia. The 8 percent economic growth target remains far from being realized, and the"Free Nutritious Meals program—intended to boost that growth figure—is considered a complete failure. The publication also reports that political party leaders may be shifting their allegiances, with some planning to take a stance in opposition to him.

Bloomberg published a similar report, noting that his approval rating has fallen below 44.5 percent—a significant drop from the 81 percent recorded in November 2025. Reuters also featured a similar report, citing the same figures and explaining that the primary drivers of this decline are dissatisfaction with the state of the economy and with Prabowo's flagship programs—specifically the Free Nutritious Meals initiative, which has been linked to recurring cases of food poisoning, and the Village Cooperatives program, which is increasingly viewed with skepticism. Meanwhile, The Star has also covered the situation, focusing on those within Prabowo's inner circle. ...who is reluctant to listen to input, a factor that has led to a decline in public trust. Prabowo is also perceived as prioritizing loyalty over leadership ability when selecting his cabinet members.

The BBC specifically highlights Indonesia as the source of the haze and smog crisis in Southeast Asia. The outlet points to Indonesia's defensive stance—an apparent unwillingness to admit fault or offer an apology for the forest and land fires within its borders that are driving the crisis. The government's sluggish response to these fires has also sparked protests from the Indonesian public, ultimately leading to a class-action lawsuit. The New York Times focuses more specifically on the growing number of demonstrations demanding a resolution to the forest and land fire crisis. This situation has caused widespread suffering and affected neighboring countries; however, the government's perceived inaction has fueled public protests.

== Timeline ==
=== First week ===
All-Indonesian Students' Union protest in front of DPR building on 5 October 2026

On October 5, 2026, LMND and BEM SI held a demonstration in front of the DPR building. Their demands included the revision and participatory deliberation of the National Education System Bill (RUU Sisdiknas), the implementation of free education, improvements to the welfare of teachers and educational staff, and guarantees for the survival and sustainability of private universities within the framework of free education. The protest turned chaotic following a scuffle—involving pushing and shoving—with the police, as well as the burning of tires by the LMND student demonstrators. This demonstration was preceded by a smaller-scale protest on October 2, 2026, involving students from various regions in front of the DPR building.

Another mass protest regarding the handling of the haze crisis took place in South Sumatra, where thousands of students from Sriwijaya University (Unsri) and Raden Fatah State Islamic University gathered in front of the South Sumatra Governor's Office in Palembang. During the protest, Governor Herman Deru met with the students and signed a petition calling for the resolution of forest and land fires within 120 hours (5x24 hours). The students' demands included urging the head of the South Sumatra Forest and Land Fire Task Force to ensure transparency in operational efforts—making them measurable and accountable—safeguarding the right to education for children in South Sumatra, and calling on the government to disclose details and provide an accounting for the IDR 100 billion in aid provided by the President.

In Batam, hundreds of residents from Bakau Serip—located in Sambau Village, Nongsa District—staged a protest in front of the Nongsa Special Economic Zone (SEZ) because water has not been flowing to their residential area for the past three months.

Great Coalition for the Indonesian Labor Struggle protest in front of DPR building

Motorcycle taxi driver union protest joining the trade union protest on 6 October

On October 6, 2026, a protest was carried out by 6,000 masses from the Great Coalition for the Indonesian Labor Struggle (KBPBI)—in front of the DPR building. The demonstration was planned to last for three days. Meanwhile, another demonstration—protesting a long-standing water supply issue—took place in front of the Palopo Mayor's office; the event turned chaotic, resulting in damage to public facilities.

On October 7, 2026, thousands of poultry farmers from Java, Sumatra, Lampung, South Sumatra, Jambi, West Nusa Tenggara (NTB), and several other provinces—all members of the National Egg Producers Association—staged a demonstration in front of the House of Representatives (DPR RI) building. They protested against rising feed prices and demanded an increase in the price of eggs at the farm level. Another demonstration took place in Palangka Raya, in front of the PLN UP3 Palangka Raya office, organized by the "Darkness-Affected Youth Movement Alliance" (Aliansi Gerakan Pemuda Gelap) and the "Youth Movement Against Blackouts" (Gerakan Pemuda Tolak Pemadaman), to demand answers regarding when the power supply disruptions would come to an end.

=== Second week ===
On October 8, a demonstration held in front of the Jambi Provincial Regional House of Representatives (DPRD) building—organized to protest the handling of forest and land fires as well as the resulting haze—turned chaotic. Protesters pushed against and damaged the gate in an attempt to gain entry to the DPRD office. Tensions escalated further as the Governor of Jambi, Al Haris, failed to appear to address the crowd. Ultimately, the police attempted to disperse the demonstrators by deploying a water cannon.

On October 11, 500 members of the Indonesian Local Cigarette Traders Association (PERLOKI) held a demonstration in front of the Grahadi State Building in Surabaya. They called on the Governor of East Java to fulfill a promise to increase employment opportunities, requested legal protection for local cigarette traders, and demanded assistance for local cigarette entrepreneurs regarding issues related to excise stamps.

On October 13, the Banten Province Youth and Student Union Movement held a demonstration in front of the National Nutrition Agency office to exercise oversight and demand transparency in the implementation of the free nutritious meal program, as well as to call for an investigation into the Nutritious Meal Service Provider units suspected of violating established regulations. In Palembang, students affiliated with the "Cipayung Plus" group staged a protest against forest and land fires in front of the South Sumatra Regional Police headquarters. The demonstration turned chaotic, resulting in three journalists—Yola Dwi Rosdiana, Mulyadi, and Rahmad Kurniawan—becoming victims of assault and intimidation. An individual forced the journalists to delete their recorded footage.

=== Third week ===
Student declaration at Taman Proklamasi

On October 19, hundreds of students from various campuses held a demonstration at the Central Kalimantan Governor's Office in Palangka Raya to protest against forest and land fires that had persisted for four months. The Governor of Central Kalimantan, Agustiar Sabran, briefly met with the protesters but did not say anything. A similar demonstration was staged by GMNI Samarinda in front of the East Kalimantan Provincial Government mosque, during which one of the Governor's aides intentionally struck a protester with a vehicle while laughing arrogantly. This action incensed the protesters. The aide, later identified as Asky Rizal Toding, issued an apology. He acknowledged that his behavior was arrogant and had caused discomfort to both the student and the public.

On October 20, another large scale protest was held again on 20 October, coincides with 2nd anniversary of Prabowo's rise to power. Students from numerous universities in Jakarta and Yogyakarta took the street to protest government response to 2026 Indonesia wildfires and demand transparency regarding the case of the high school and university diploma of Vice President Gibran Rakabuming Raka (see Gibran Rakabuming Raka diploma controversy). In Yogyakarta the protest was focused on Yogyakarta Regional Representative Council building and in Jakarta, the protest was focused on Heroes Monument and Danareksa Tower. prior to the mobilization, a large banner-hanging action carried out by Greenpeace in the morning went viral on social media, serving as a prelude to a larger demonstration that took place later that day. The banners protested environmental destruction occurring during the Prabowo administration, alleging that the government had failed to take any meaningful action to address it. The demonstration subsequently began at the Proclamation Monument (Tugu Proklamasi) at 15:00 WIB, featuring speeches by students from various universities, including UI, UGM, Unpad, Unnes, Undip, Unibraw, Unair, UPN Veteran Jogja, PNJ, Universitas Pancasila, and ULM. The protest continued at Tugu Tani, drawing various segments of society who criticized the poor performance of the Prabowo-Gibran administration two years into its term. The demonstration concluded in the evening with chants of "Revolution" and the raising of three fingers as a symbol of resistance. A similar demonstration also took place at the Horse Statue (Patung Kuda), organized by students from the National University (Universitas Nasional), the Open University (Universitas Terbuka), GMNI South Jakarta, and HMI.

Protesters in Heroes Monument, Jakarta

In Jakarta, a demonstration under the banner of the "Pedaling to the Palace" movement ended in a verbal confrontation after police blocked the participants from entering the Taman Pandang area near the presidential palace. The group had initially intended to join the Kamisan (Thursday) protest and voice demands regarding forest and land fires. Tensions rose because the police had previously allowed cars and motorcycles to pass through; however, after blocking the cyclists, the police sealed off the road with multiple layers of barricades. Separately, students from the State University of Jakarta (UNJ) held a long march along Jalan Pemuda. Although it caused traffic congestion and briefly turned chaotic due to an attempt to set tires on fire, the protest was, on the whole, supported by the public, who honked their vehicle horns in solidarity.

In Yogyakarta, students from various organizations—including the UGM student union, UII Bergerak, Aliansi UMY Bergerak, BEM Nusantara DIY, the Yogyakarta branch of HMI, and the National Student Front (FMN)—staged a demonstration, marching from the Regional House of Representatives (DPRD) building to the Kilometer Zero landmark. The protest ended in chaos following the throwing of firecrackers and stones. Police and members of the public attempted to disperse the crowd, leaving some individuals trapped; these people were then escorted by police officers into the hallway of the DIY Regional House of Representatives (DPRD) building to protect them from the anger of the crowd. The demonstration was accompanied by shouts of "Revolution," though the situation was eventually brought back under control. In Bandung, an alliance consisting of students and residents of Dago Elos held demonstrations at several locations, including the West Java Regional House of Representatives (DPRD) building, the Asia-Afrika area, and Cikapayang. The demonstrations turned violent, with police trucks pelted with stones and Molotov cocktails, and the Simpang Lima Monument defaced with graffiti. Vandalism, a vehicle used by the National Nutrition Agency was damaged, and 11 police officers were injured. Eight university students from two different institutions were taken into police custody following the incident. Meanwhile, in Makassar, demonstrations took place at 33 locations, demanding a comprehensive evaluation of the performance of the Prabowo's administration—which has been deemed poor— particularly regarding the handling of forest and land fires. They also demanded the resignation of relevant ministers, including the Minister of Forestry, the Coordinating Minister for Food, and the Minister of Energy and Mineral Resources. The demonstration turned chaotic, involving shoving and physical altercations between police and students. In Medan, protests took place in front of the Governor's Office and the North Sumatra Regional House of Representatives (DPRD). In Aceh, a demonstration in front of the Governor's Office turned chaotic, involving shoving matches, and students affiliated with the Front Mahasiswa Aceh Resistance (Aceh Student Resistance Front) tore down the eastern gate. Meanwhile, in Pekanbaru, the Student Executive Board (BEM) of Lancang Kuning University (Unilak) held a demonstration in front of the Riau Governor's Office to protest against forest and land fires, as well as the increasingly prevalent practice of LGBT activities in nightlife venues.

On October 23, a demonstration in Palangka Raya by hundreds of people—organized under the "Alliance of the Community with the People" (Aliansi Masyarakat Bersama Rakyat)—ended in chaos. Protesters demanded the resignation of the Governor of Central Kalimantan, accusing him of being indifferent to their concerns, as he failed to appear to meet with the participants. The protesters also complained about being pitted against pro-government groups and targeted by negative campaigns on social media. In Pontianak, the demonstrations—which had been ongoing from the 20th to the 22nd—evolved into the "West Kalimantan Revolution: Volume 3," held at the Digulis Roundabout.

On October 24, protests were also expressed creatively—with messages highlighting the slow response to forest and land fires—through the use of jerseys and posters by participants and spectators at the Jakarta Running Festival.

=== Fourth week ===
On October 26, BEM SI held a demonstration in Bandung, demanding an evaluation of the first two years of the Prabowo Subianto's administration, as well as action against those deemed responsible for forest and land fires in Indonesia. The protest took place in front of the West Java Regional House of Representatives (DPRD) office at 3:00 PM, before moving to the Dago-Cikapayang intersection in early morning.

Clashes between student protesters and police officers in front of Plaza Indonesia bus station

Students lighting flares in front of Mandarin Oriental Hotel Jakarta

On October 28, 2026, students from across Indonesia held a demonstration at the Selamat Datang Monument. Although the protest was initially prohibited by the police, the participants managed to circumvent the ban by using share taxis (angkots) to arrive from several different entry points simultaneously. By around 15:00, the roundabout was filled with demonstrators. The protest featured the carrying of a red cross, symbolizing resistance against environmental destruction in Papua. The crowd remained until the evening, despite the rain, before being forcibly dispersed by the use of water cannons and tear gas. Being left with no choice, students begin to forcibly remove the plastic barriers installed in front of UOB Plaza that blocked the access to M.H. Thamrin Street by smashing and burning the plastic barriers. Several students also was seen kicking police officers equipped with riot shields. Lasted until late night, student protesters also held a mass impromptu maghrib prayer at 18:00 before resuming the demonstration with flares being lit shortly after the prayer.
