= Fikret =

Fikret is a male and rarely a female given name of Arabic origin meaning idea, thought. It is commonly used in Turkey and Bosnia.

== Given name ==
=== First name ===
- Fikret Abdić (born 1939), Bosnian politician and businessman
- Fikret Alić, Bosniak survivor of the 1992 Keraterm and Trnopolje concentration camps
- Fikret Amirov (1922–1984), Azerbaijani composer
- Fikret Arıcan (1912–1994), Turkish footballer
- Fikret Berkes (born 1945), Turkish Canadian ecologist
- Fikret Emek (born 1963), retired soldier from the Special Forces Command
- Fikret Güler (1953-2023), Turkish Taekwon-Do practitioner
- Fikret Hakan (1934-2017), Turkish film actor
- Fikret Hodžić (1953–1992), professional bodybuilder from Bosnia and Herzegovina
- Fikret Kırcan (1919–2014), Turkish footballer
- Fikret Kızılok (1947–2001), Turkish musician
- Fikret Kuşkan (born 1965), Turkish actor
- Fikret Mujkić (born 1949), former Yugoslav and Bosnian footballer
- Fikret Orman (born 1967), Turkish businessman
- Fikret Özsoy (born 1965), Turkish javelin throw record holder
- Fikret Mualla Saygı (1904–1967), Turkish painter
- Fikrat Yusifov (born 1957), Azerbaijani economist

=== Middle name ===
- Tevfik Fikret Ucar (born 1966), Turkish academic

== Family name ==
- Tevfik Fikret (1867–1915), Ottoman poet
