= Edibe Sözen =

Turkish politician

Prof. Dr. Edibe Sözen Yavuz
- Born: Edibe Sözen; 1 January 1961 (age 65); Sivas, Turkey
- Education: International Relations
- Alma mater: Marmara University; Istanbul University; University of Wisconsin–Madison
- Occupations: Academic, politician
- Political party: Justice and Development Party (AKP)

Edibe Sözen Yavuz (born Edibe Sözen; 1 January 1961) is an academic of sociology and communications, and politician.

== Early life and academic career ==
Born at Sivas to Doğan Sözen and his wife Nevzade on 1 January 1961, she is a great-niece of Nurettin Sözen, a member of the social democratic Republican People's Party (CHP) and former mayor of Istanbul.

Edibe Sözen graduated from Marmara University, Faculty of Economics and Administrative Sciences, Department of International Relations with a BSc degree in 1982. She made her master's degree and earned a PhD title from the Faculty of Economics at Istanbul University. She completed her post-doctoral studies at University of Wisconsin–Madison, US.

In 1994, she became associate professor of sociology, and was appointed professor of communications in 2000 in Istanbul University. She was visiting professor at universities in Utah, Arizona, Chicago, USA and Cologne, Germany. She served as vice dean at Istanbul University.

Sozen published eight books about social life and communications.

== Political career ==
In 2006, Edibe Sözen suspended her academic career, and joined the ruling social conservative Justice and Development Party (AKP). She was elected vice chairperson of the party as the second female member, and appointed responsible for media and publicity. In the 2007 general election, she won a seat in the parliament as a deputy from Istanbul Province.

In 2008, Sözen prepared a law proposal about the protection of youth, and sent it to the minister responsible for youth and sports to be forwarded in the parliament. It would ban entry of underaged into restaurants after 22:00 hours and youth's visit of internet cafés, provide closure of nightclubs at midnight, establishment of a worship place in all schools and keeping record for buyers of pornographic publication. As it became public, and sparked controversy in the public, she defended herself that she was inspired by a German law and they (the AKP) bring Western standards to Turkey. The Constitutional Court of Turkey threatened with closure of the AKP due to offending secularity, and sanctioned with cutting of financial aids by the state. Following a harsh reaction by the party leader Recep Tayyip Erdoğan, and a decision of the party's high commission distancing itself from her proposal, she announced that her draft does not bind the party, and she will not submit it in the parliament.

She was dropped from the candidate nomination list by the party for the 2011 general election. In the 2012 party congress, she was re-elected to the party's central committee.

In September 2013, Sözen announced her candidature in the 2014 local elections for the mayorship of Maltepe district in Istanbul Province. She lost the election to her rival Ali Kılıç from the CHP.

== Books ==
- Medyatik Hafıza (1999)
- Söylem (2000)
- Kimliklerimiz (2000)
- Kertenkele Mantığı (2004)
- İnsan Hakları Bir Gündelik Hayat Pratiği (Sözen, Ayten, İri) (2006)
- Türkiye'nin ABD ve AB Denklemi (Gökçe, Demiray, Sözen) (2006)
- Sosyal Kimlikten Siyasal Kimliğe Geçişte Kadın (2008)
- Hepimiz Globaliz Hepimiz Yereliz (2012)
