= Joko Widodo university diploma controversy =

Controversies regarding the authenticity of the university diploma owned by Joko Widodo (Jokowi), the 7th president of Indonesia, began to intensify since 2022 following the last election he participated in. The document claims that he graduated from the Faculty of Forestry at Gadjah Mada University (UGM) on 5 November 1985. The Indonesian government have regularly dismissed the accusation of a "fake diploma", and Jokowi later threatened to report those questioning its authenticity. UGM has also insisted that the original diploma is being held by Jokowi.

This controversy began with photographs of Joko Widodo that differ from his real appearance. In the photos on his diploma, graduation records, and the attachments submitted for his registration as Mayor of Surakarta, his ears appear aligned differently, whereas in real life his ears protrude backward, making them noticeably different from the original appearance, that causes the invitation of conspiracy theories.

On 22 May 2025, after comparing Joko Widodo' university diploma with other diplomas and UGM's university record, Criminal Investigation Agency declared his university diploma authentic.

== Timeline ==
Some sources claim that the controversy revolving around Jokowi's diploma began as early as 2014, when he first participated in the election.

On 17 June 2015, deputy speaker of the House of Representatives Commission X, Ridwan Hisyam, requested to Jokowi to reveal his diplomas to the public, in order to end the practice of producing fake diplomas. He made this statement after Ministry of Research and Technology previously declared International Management Institution of Indonesia (LMII) as an illegal higher educational institution.

On 21 January 2019, Umar Kholid Harahap was arrested by the Criminal Investigation Agency, after claiming that junior (SMP) and senior high school (SMA) diplomas owned by Jokowi were fake. He was also accused for "spreading fake news". His claim had been reposted by Twitter users. Headmaster of SMA Negeri 06 Surakarta, Agung Wijayanto, confirmed that Jokowi was one of the first batch of students in 1976, following its foundation on 26 November 1975 as a high school in prepared construction (SMPP), and his diploma was indeed authentic.

In June 2020, Navias Tanjung posted on Facebook, a collage consisting of the images of UGM diplomas owned by Bambang Nurcahyo and Joko Widodo, noticing the differences of dean's signatures. In September that year, another Facebook user posted the same collage, claiming that the Jokowi's diploma was fake, while attacking his policy on cleric registration.

In October 2022, Bambang Tri Mulyono together with Sugi Nur Rahardja unsuccessfully challenged its authenticity at Central Jakarta District Court, causing them to be accused of "spreading fake news and hate speech" and sentenced to 6 years. In December 2022, chairman of LESPASS Legal Aid Institute, Ahmad Khozinudin, requested to prosecutors to invite Jokowi and reveal his own diploma, and claiming it as "the only authentic method".

The controversy resurfaced on 11 March 2025, when Rismon Hasiholan Sianipar, a Yamaguchi University alumni, a former lecturer at the University of Mataram and a forensic analyst expert, uploaded a video on his YouTube channel and published a book named Uncovering the Jokowi’s Fake Diploma: Forensic Analysis of Document Manipulation. He judged that the diploma uses Times New Roman typeface, which did not exist on computers until the 1990s. Rismon, however, retracted all of his previous statements and pulling his books and apologized to everyone including Joko Widodo family for stirring the issue citing "errors" and "being manipulated by political groups" and asked everyone who believed such ideas to renounce it fully.

== Response ==
=== Individual reactions ===
Former Coordinating Minister for Political and Security Affairs, Mahfud MD, stated that Jokowi's policies would not be affected by controversies regarding his diploma, according to the legal certainty principle. Meanwhile, Rocky Gerung viewed the controversy as a simple issue but made complicated, and reminded that if this issue is not going to be resolved, it would harm Jokowi's image and give burden to current president Prabowo Subianto.

Former Speaker of the People's Consultative Assembly of the Republic of Indonesia, Amien Rais, said Gadjah Mada University became Jokowi's political doormat and believes that his diploma does not exist. He said that what existed were only fake diplomas.

Chairman of DPP Gerakan Rakyat Indonesia Bersatu Jaya Rosario de Marshal, believes Jokowi's diploma is genuine because he has not seen any problems with his diploma from his time as Mayor. He said he was also disturbed by the resurfacing of the issue of Jokowi's fake diploma and states that Jokowi will not be able to be mayor, governor and president if he's really using a fake diploma. Chairman of Indonesian Solidarity Party and Jokowi's second son Kaesang Pangarep only said "It's just usual" without giving further comments. Minister of Energy and Mineral Resources and chairman of Golkar Bahlil Lahadalia called the accusations on Jokowi as outrageous and unnecessary, stating that he never believed on the accusations and stated that Bareskrim had confirmed the diploma's authenticity.

Prabowo himself reacted to the issue of Jokowi's diploma authenticity in a cabinet meeting that was also attended by his son, Vice President Gibran Rakabuming Raka. Looking towards Gibran, Prabowo lamented that the more this issue is raised, his own diploma will also be come into questioning and rejected any calls that said he is Jokowi's puppet.

Former President Megawati Sukarnoputri said that the controversy can be easily resolved if the diploma is publicly revealed and then said that its not hard to do so. Her statements however was criticized by Jokowi's legal team saying that Megawati's solution is not as simple as it looks and the issue is too politicized and aiming to destroy Jokowi's image. Jokowi's supporter organization Projo also criticized Megawati, with the leader Budi Arie Setiadi saying that Megawati and PDI-P should help ending the controversy, knowing that they had named Jokowi their candidates in the past instead of fanning the flames. However, PDI-P politician Guntur Romli reacted that Projo shouldn't overreact because Megawati didn't mention Jokowi and they should not feel offended. Meanwhile, former presidential candidate Ganjar Pranowo states his disinterest to comment on Jokowi's diploma and states that there are more important matters than that to discuss.

Former Vice President Jusuf Kalla was accused for being the person who funded Roy Suryo's lawsuit to which he denies it. Kalla clarifies that he positioned himself as someone who wants to end the conflict and he was saddened to see that the people had bickered amongst themselves for 2 years to determine if Jokowi's university diploma was real or not. He advised Jokowi to reveal his diploma to the public while confirming its authenticity. Kalla also vented his anger towards Jokowi's supporters, stating that Jokowi is able to become president because of him. Jokowi reacted stating that he has the right to not show the diploma while demanding all accusers to proof their claims. Prior to that, on June 3, 2025, while attending a graduation ceremony of Hasanuddin University students, Kalla joked on never opening his own diploma since his graduation in 1967 and reminded all graduates to keep their diplomas safe and neat to avoid legimity problems in the future.

Former Chief Justice of the Constitutional Court of Indonesia Jimly Asshiddiqie states that Jokowi's university diploma controversy is just an administrative problem that should've been just resolved in the administrative court (PTUN) instead of a criminal court and the police has no right to state the document's authenticity. Jimly also advised that all sides must take the correct legal steps to resolve the issue to avoid a bad precedent.

=== Protests ===
On 15 April, hundreds members of the Ulama and Activist Defence Team (TPUA) came to the Faculty of Forestry, Universitas Gadjah Mada (UGM) to ask for clarification on the alleged fake diploma. They gathered in front of Room 109 of the faculty around 07:45 a.m. Not long after, four representatives of the protesters entered the room to attend an audience with the rector regarding Jokowi's diploma.

On 16 April, protesters from the Ulama and Activist Defence Team (TPUA) who wanted to see the authenticity of the diploma, came to Jokowi's residence in Surakarta. The atmosphere was heated around Jokowi's residence when the TPUA camp met with dozens of Jokowo's supporters who had been waiting since morning and then subsided after security officers, both the police on guard and the Paspampres, allowed representatives to meet with Jokowi. There were at least four representatives who met Jokowi inside his residence, one of whom was TPUA Deputy, Chair Rizal Fadillah. He confirmed this when met by reporters after the meeting with Jokowi. He said the purpose of their visit to Jokowi's residence was not only to stay in touch in the atmosphere of Eid al-Fitr like other residents, but also to connect with Jokowi's diploma. The meeting lasted about 30 minutes. However, their hopes of being shown Jokowi's diploma directly had to be dashed. Because during the meeting, Jokowi did not show his diploma to them.

Prior to the meeting with TPUA, Joko Widodo invited dozens of media crews including CNN Indonesia to enter his residence. However, Jokowi did not allow media crews to take pictures during the meeting and was asked to collect mobile phones and cameras. He showed all of his diplomas from elementary to high school, and also his undergraduate degree at UGM. The UGM diploma shown by Jokowi is very similar to the image circulating on social media. However, Jokowi was reluctant to confirm the similarity of the circulating diploma photo with his own.

== See also ==
- Gibran Rakabuming Raka diploma controversy
- Recep Tayyip Erdoğan university diploma controversy
