= Yıldo =

Turkish personality

- Born: Ahmet Yıldırım Benayyat; 18 October 1945 (age 80); Konya, Turkey
- Occupations: Showman, actor, sportsman
- Children: Alihan Benayyat

Ahmet Yıldırım Benayyat (born 18 October 1945), better known as Yıldo, is a famous Turkish showman (talk show host), actor, retired football and volleyball player.

== Biography ==
=== Early life ===
Yıldo was born in Konya, Turkey. He studied high school in several different cities of Turkey due to his father's job. He completed his university education in Istanbul Academy of Economic and Commercial Sciences (Marmara University), economics department in 1973.

Sport audiences first heard his name when he broke the record for the 400 meter hurdles in a Turkish youth athletic championship in 1963. When still a student in high school, he transferred to the Turkish sports club Boluspor as a football player in 1965. Then he transferred to the famous Istanbul sport club Galatasaray as a volleyball player in 1967. His nickname (Yıldo, a diminutive of his name Yıldırım) was bestowed on him by his friend and teammate Yavuz Işılay. Yıldo once more returned to professional football, playing for Şekerspor, Galatasaray, Istanbulspor, Sarıyer and Gaziantepspor.

=== After 1980 ===
Following his football career, he worked in the plastic bag production sector in the 1980s. He was one of the protagonists at plastic bag sector in Turkey in the 1980s. In 1993, he entered the media sector with a show on Star TV in which he was the host of a quiz show called Süper Turnike. He then began to produce shows on various Turkish television channels. He became Turkey's first showman of nighttime television.

He captured the attention of Turkish TV audiences and was known for coining the catchphrase Kafadan Koparma (breaking off your head), a condition of hysterical overexcitement. The phrase became a common Turkish idiom. He is also famous for his striking laugh.

Yıldo has acted in several soap-operas and films. His most recent television appearance has been participation in a 2007 celebrity ice skating competition Buzda Dans (Dancing on Ice).

== Career ==
Film Actor

- Kutsal Damacana, 2007
- Aynı Çatı Altında, 2006
- Kızma Birader, 2005
- Biz Boşanıyoruz, 2004
- Dansöz, 2000
- Hemşo, 2000
- Keloğlan, 1999

Football Player

- Galatasaray
- İstanbulspor
- Gaziantepspor
- Boluspor
- Sarıyer
- Şekerspor

Volleyball Player

- Galatasaray
- Boluspor
