= Ali Kurumahmut =

Turkish bureaucrat, lecturer, and lawyer (born 1960)

Ali Kurumahmut (born 1 October 1960) is a Turkish bureaucrat, lecturer, lawyer, and a former member of the Turkish Council of State.

== Early life and career ==
Ali Kurumahmut was born in Of, Trabzon Province, Turkey. He graduated from Naval Academy, Istanbul in 1982. In 1995, he graduated from Istanbul University Law Faculty. He holds a master's degree in International Law from Marmara University. Following years he completed the Staff Academy and the Armed Forces Academy. He left the Navy when he was a staff colonel in 2002.

He took an active role in the management of Kardak (Imia) crisis.

He served as General Director of Maritime Transportation at the Undersecreteriat of Maritime Affairs, Ministry of Transportation from 18 July 2003 to 17 October 2005. From 2005 to 2013, he acted as advisor to some members of the cabinet and lectured in the Turkish War Academies.

Kurumahmut was appointed as justice to Turkish Council of State 8th Chamber in 2013 by President Abdullah Gül. He left the office on 23 July 2016.

His publications include The Twilight Zones in The Aegean (Un)Forgetten Turkish Islands, Ege'de Temel Sorun: Egemenliği Tartışmalı Adalar, Deniz Subayları için Temel Deniz Hukuku, Montrö Sözleşmesi, Türk Boğazları ve Karadeniz. He speaks English.
