= Marmara University =

Public university in Marmara, Istanbul, Turkey

Coordinates: 40.9861°N 29.0536°E

- Marmara Üniversitesi
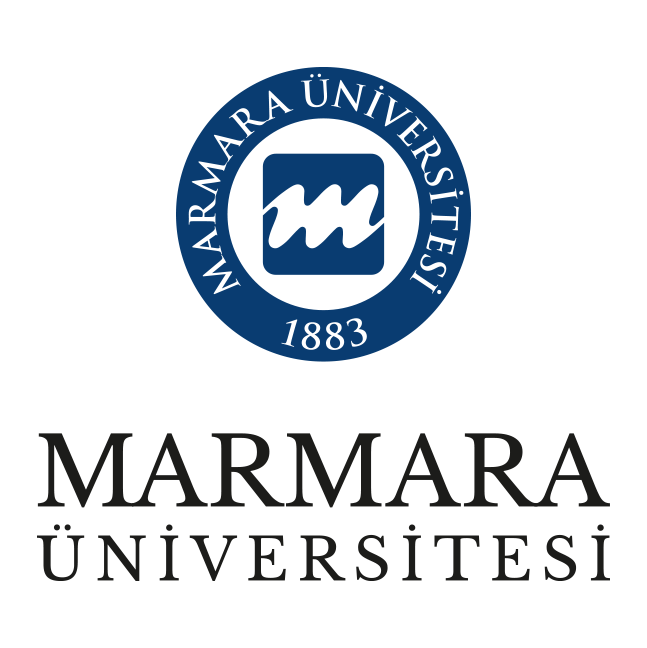
- Former names: Hamidiye Ticaret Mekteb-i Âlisi (1883-1959); Istanbul Economy and Commerce Academy (1959-1982)
- Type: Public research university
- Established: 1883; 143 years ago
- Affiliations: EUA
- Rector: Prof.Dr. Mehmet Emin Okur
- Faculty: 2,835
- Administrative staff: 1,375
- Students: 50,092
- Location: Istanbul, Turkey
- Campus: Urban
- Website: marmara.edu.tr Building details
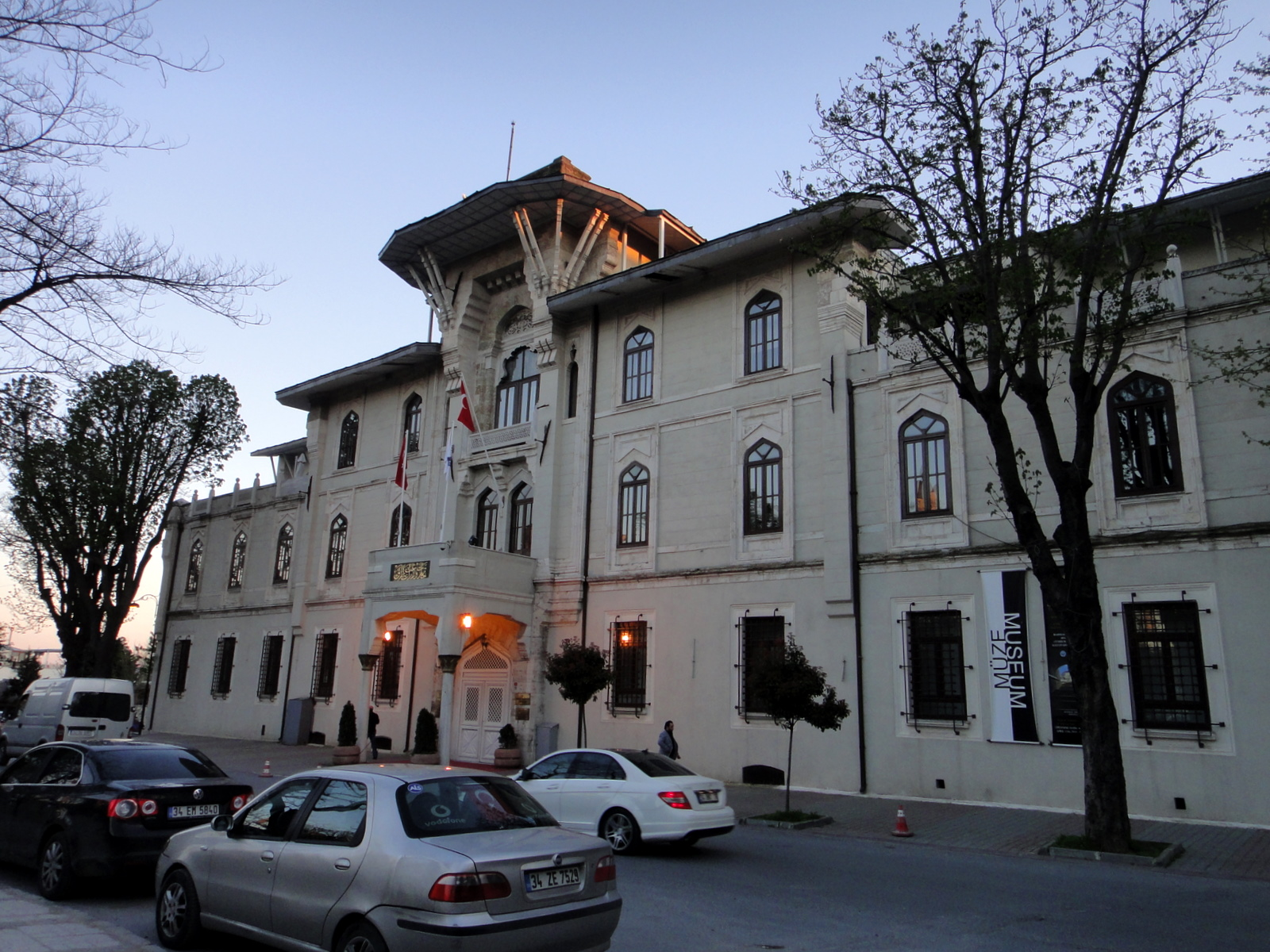
- Imperial College of Medicine, currently the Haydarpaşa Campus of Marmara University in the Kadıköy, Istanbul. The building was designed by architects Alexander Vallaury and Raimondo D'Aronco.

University rankings

Global – Overall
- ARWU World: 901-1000
- CWTS World: 851
- QS World: 1001-1200
- RUR World: 648
- THE World: 801-1000
- USNWR Global: 875

Regional – Overall
- QS Emerging Europe and Central Asia: 201-210 (2022)

Marmara University (Turkish: Marmara Üniversitesi) is a public research university in Istanbul, Turkey. The university, named after the Sea of Marmara, was founded as a university in 1982. However, its origins date back to 1883, when it was established as Hamidiye Ticaret Mekteb-i Âlisi in a house in central Istanbul. The university offers courses in five languages: Turkish, English, German, French, and Arabic, making it the only multilingual university in Turkey. It operates 13 campuses, 11 institutes, 8 colleges, and 28 research centers. Prominent alumni include Turkish comic actor Kemal Sunal, and former media mogul Aydın Doğan.

== Organisation ==
Marmara University has several campuses in Istanbul and offers education in five languages: Turkish, English, German, French, and Arabic. The university employs 2,839 faculty members and has 57,000 students, including 44,661 undergraduate students and 7,406 graduate students. A total of 1,354 international students from 73 countries are enrolled at the institution. Female students make up 54% of the total student population. The broadcasting services at the campuses include Marmara University TV and Radio Marmara. Marmara University has 12 campuses, with one of them serving as a hospital, widespread to the city of Istanbul.

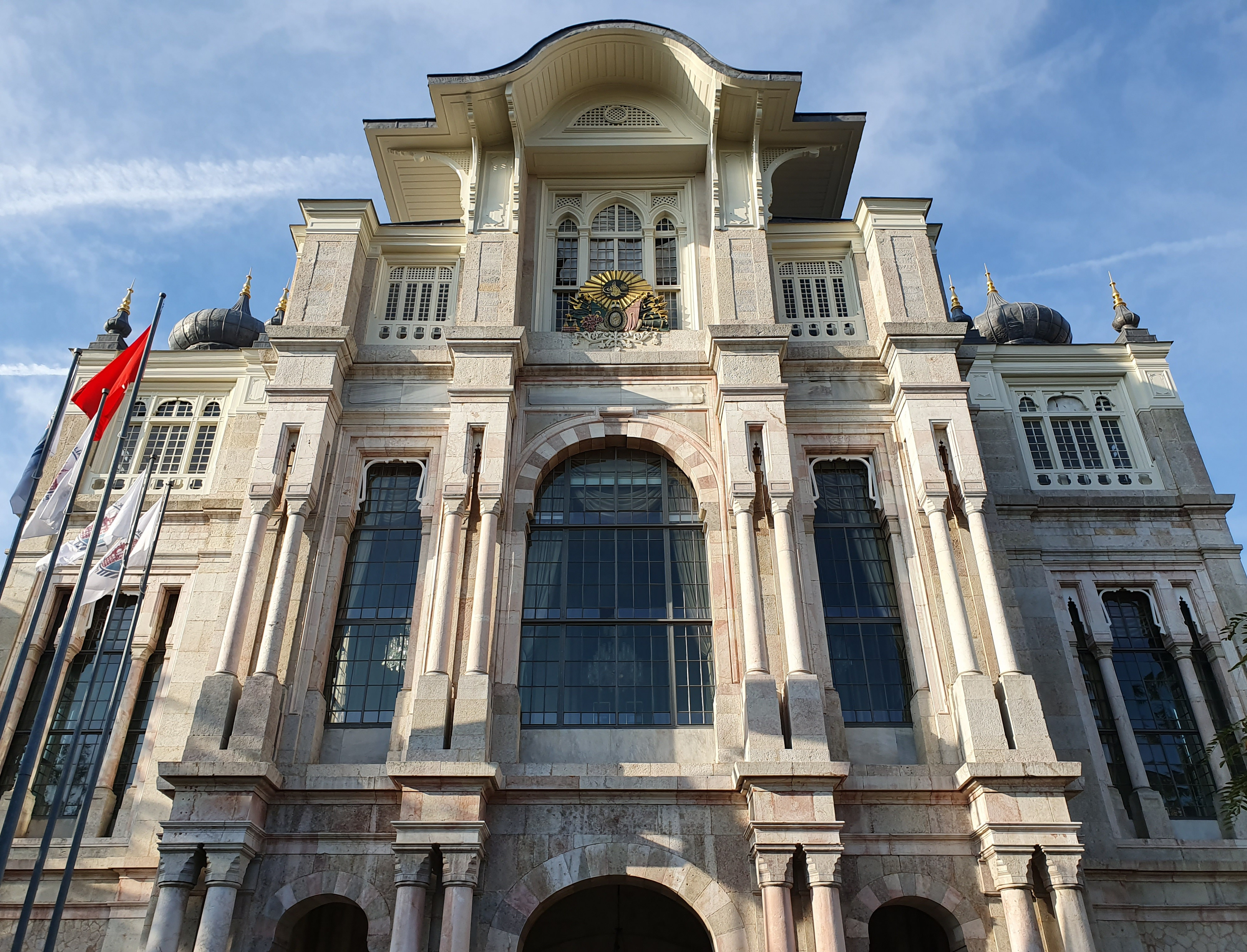
Haydarpaşa Campus

=== Campuses ===
- Göztepe Main Campus
- Acıbadem Campus
- Anadoluhisarı Campus
- Bağlarbaşı Campus
- Kartal Campus
- Mehmet Genç Campus (Formerly Istanbul Şehir University)
- Recep Tayyip Erdoğan Maltepe Campus
- Sultanahmet Campus
- Pendik Marmara University Hospital

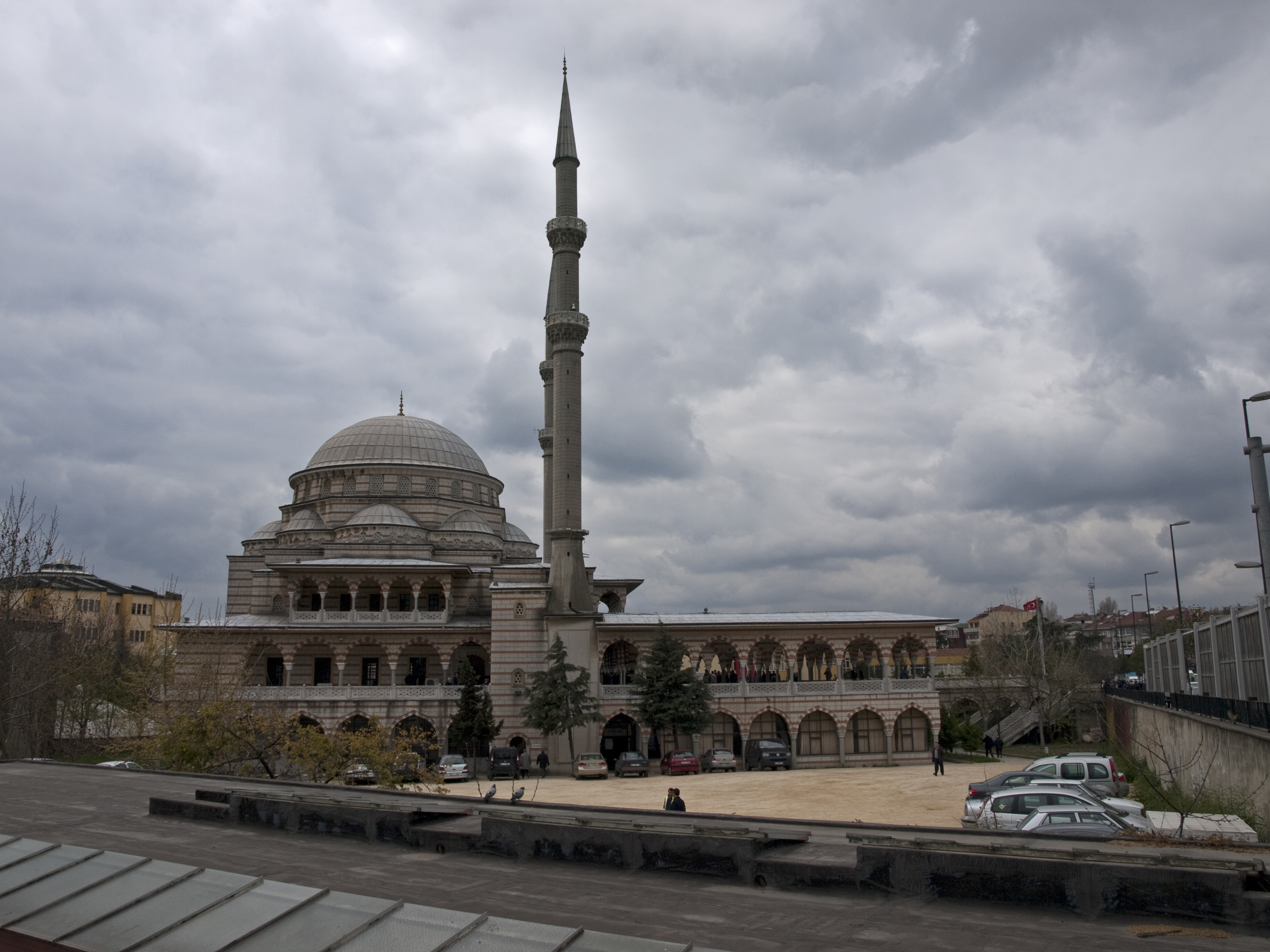
Faculty of Theology

=== Faculties ===
- Faculty of Medicine
- Faculty of Dentistry
- Faculty of Law
- Faculty of Economics and Administrative Sciences
- Atatürk Faculty of Education
- Faculty of Pharmacy
- Faculty of Arts and Sciences
- Faculty of Fine Arts
- Faculty of Theology
- Faculty of Communication
- Faculty of Engineering
- Faculty of Technology
- Faculty of Health Education

=== Vocational Schools ===
- School of Banking and Insurance
- School of Physical Education and Sports
- School of Nursing
- İstanbul Zeynep Kamil Vocational School of Health Services
- School of Foreign Languages
- Vocational School of Divinity
- Vocational School of Health Related Professions
- Vocational School of Social Studies
- Vocational School of Technical Studies

=== Graduate Schools ===
- Institute for Graduate Studies in Pure and Applied Sciences
- Institute of European Studies
- Institute of Banking and Insurance
- Institute of Educational Sciences
- Institute of Gastroenterology
- Institute of Fine Arts
- Institute of Neurological Sciences
- Institute of Medical Studies
- Institute of Social Sciences
- Institute of Turkic Studies
- Institute of Middle Eastern Studies
- Institute of Health Sciences

=== Sports ===
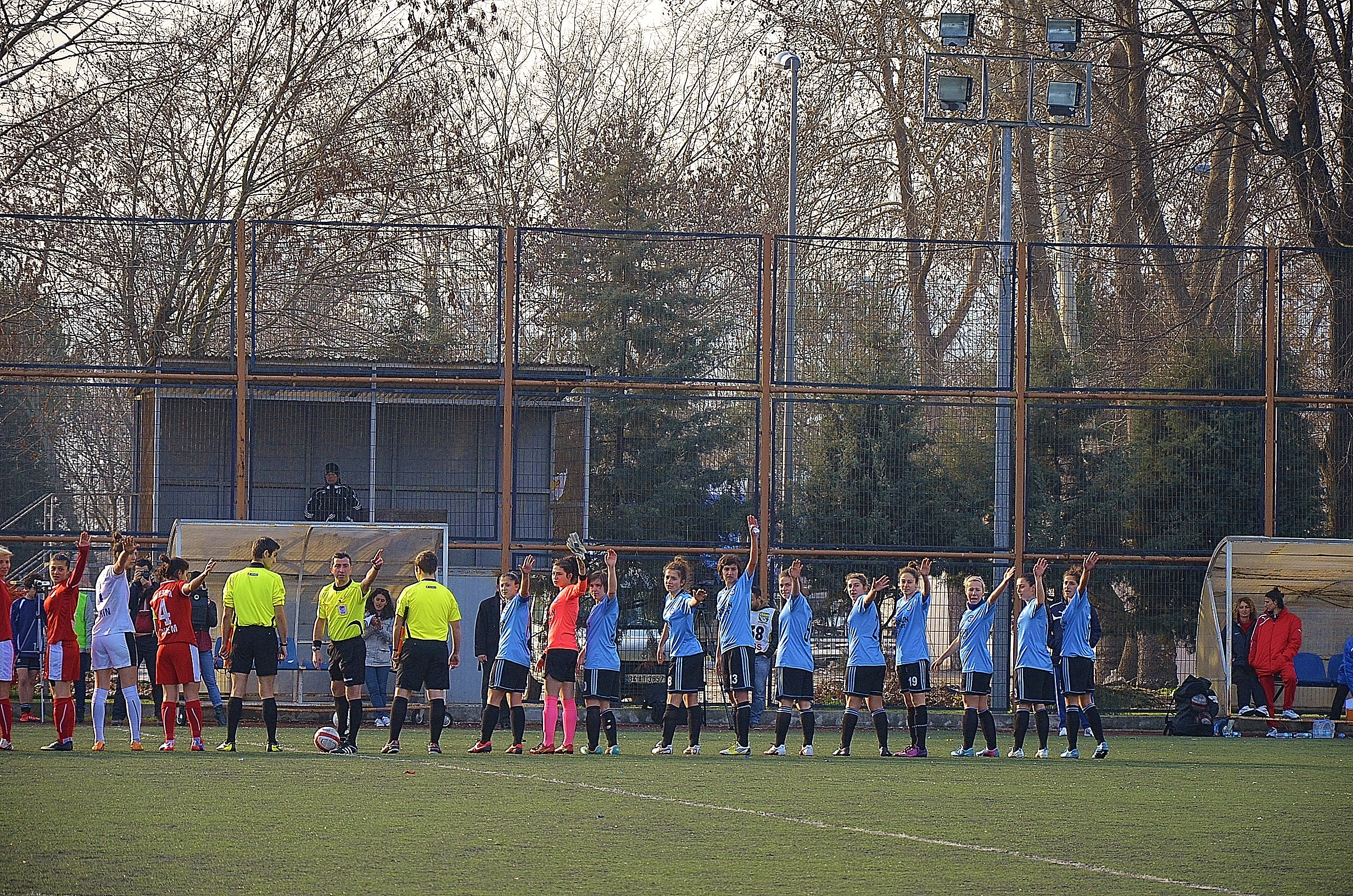
Women's football team of Marmara University

Sport and leisure activities at the university are officially organized by the Directorate of Health, Culture, and Sports and are available to both students and university personnel. The facilities support a variety of sports, including basketball, volleyball, chess, table tennis, dancing, fitness, tae-bo, and mountaineering.

At the Göztepe Campus, there is a sports hall with a capacity of 850, which can be expanded to 2,000. In addition to the main hall, there are three smaller multi-purpose halls, three classrooms, a fitness center, a billiards saloon, and a darkroom for the Photography Club and photography courses. The campus also features open courts for tennis, volleyball, and basketball.

Students are encouraged to participate in men's and women's school teams for volleyball, basketball, and soccer in the Rectorate Cup, as well as in tournaments for chess and table tennis and inter-university games.

The Anadoluhisarı Campus offers a multi-purpose sports hall, indoor and outdoor sports areas (such as tennis and volleyball), field sports (such as football and soccer), and other activities (such as gymnastics, fitness, and wrestling). It also has an indoor Olympic swimming pool, a mini golf course, a boathouse, and an athletics track.

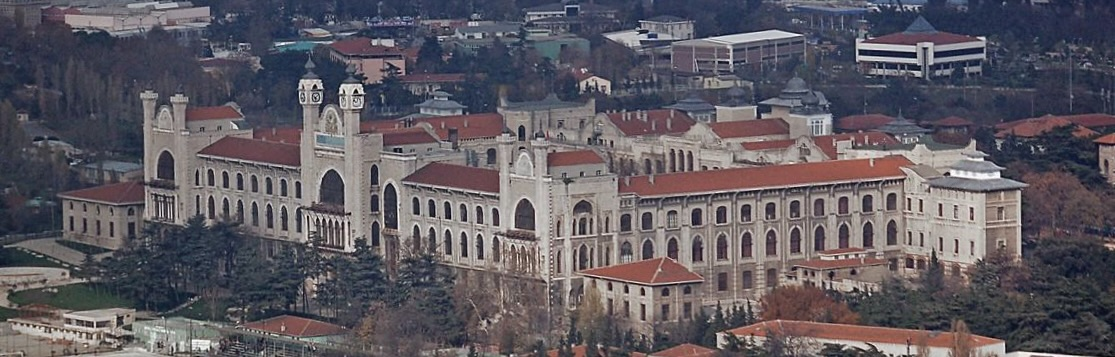
Imperial College of Medicine, formerly the Haydarpaşa Campus of Marmara University in the Kadıköy district of Istanbul. The building was designed by architects Alexander Vallaury and Raimondo D'Aronco. The building is currently used as the Hamidiye Campus of University of Health Sciences.

== International profile ==
Marmara University is an institution that hosts and participates in scientific meetings, cultural activities, art exhibitions, sports, and various other national and international events. Marmara University is a member of the European University Association (EUA). Faculties of Engineering and Technical Education are also carrying out their international studies through ABET. The Faculty of Economics and Administrative Sciences and the Institute of Social Sciences are in the process of preparation for the quality assessment carried out by EQUIS, an international system of accreditation in management and business administration in Europe. The Institute of Social Sciences is now an institutional member of EFMD, European Foundation for Management Development. The Faculty of Law consistently participates in several international moot court competitions such as Phillip C. Jessup Moot Court Competition in the United States and Willem C. Vis Moot Court Competition in Austria. The Faculty of Law along with the Department of Political Science and International Relations represents the university in several different Model United Nations programs every year.

The university serves students from 73 countries and has focused on developing and expanding its international relations. Most recently Marmara University acts to forge links with other European universities and also with the institutions outside the EU that will allow students and researchers to access a wide range of opportunities. Many academic units within the university have been successful in developing student and lecturer exchanges within the framework of the Erasmus and Socrates programmes offered by the European Commission. Within the Faculty of Economics and Administrative Sciences, the Department of Political Science and International Relations alone has developed Erasmus Agreements with the Center for European Studies, Jagiellonian University, Poland; Department of Political Science, Stockholm University, Sweden; Faculty of Preservation of Cultural Heritage, University of Bologna, Italy; Faculty of Political and Social Science, University of Antwerp, Belgium; Institute for Political Science, University of Regensburg, Germany and the Institute for Political Science, Johannes Gutenberg University of Mainz, Germany; College of Social Pedagogy, Alice Salomon Vocational College Hannover, Germany. While the Faculty of Law has its links with University of Münster, Free University of Berlin, Bielefeld University, University of Cologne from Germany, University of Athens from Greece, University of Linz from Austria, Paris Descartes University from France and University of Siena from Italy.

The International Office of Marmara University and the student-oriented ESN Marmara organization provide support to the foreign students among the university. Every year the students of Marmara University Management Club organize an 'International Week' to promote the social standings of the international community of Marmara University along with offering a wide-ranged cultural program to the international guest-students invited to the event.

=== Efficiency in Erasmus Programme ===
Between the 2003-2004 and 2009-2010 educational terms the university sent 1,097 students abroad by Erasmus Programme. The students who admitted to the program had chances to study 1-2 terms in one of the 230 partner universities of 22 European countries. 95% of the admitted students applied to the undergraduate and graduate programs while the other 5% had the chance of admitting to the foreign internship programs. Mentioned students were financially supported in their time abroad by the university and European Commission. Based on statistics published by the EU Education and Youth Programmes Center, Marmara University is one of the top 3 choices among the foreign students who have applied to the exchange programs offered in Turkey.

Marmara University has offered free intensive language courses (EILC) in Turkish for foreign students since 2006. As a result of this program, the university won the European Language Label, an award offered from European Commission.

=== Rankings ===
In 2018, Marmara University was ranked within the 801-1000 range globally by Times Higher Education.

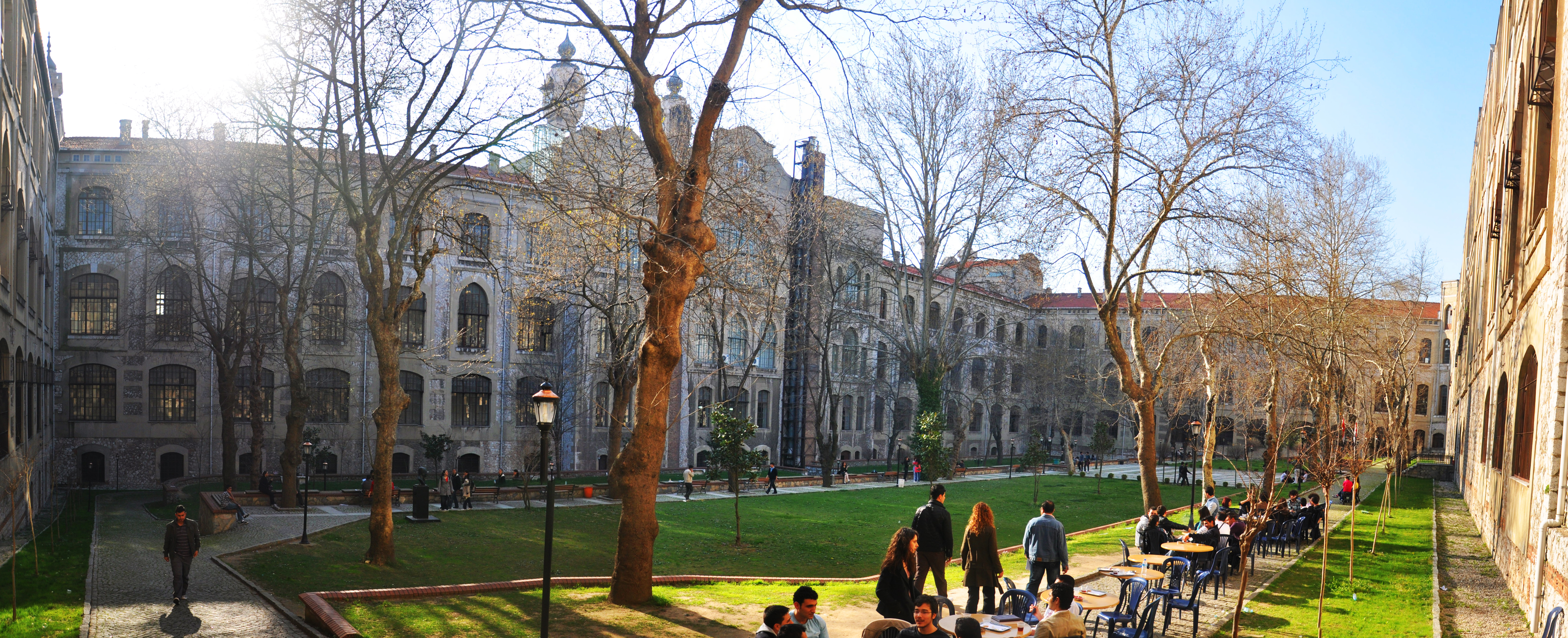
Students at the courtyard of the Haydarpaşa Campus

== Alumni ==
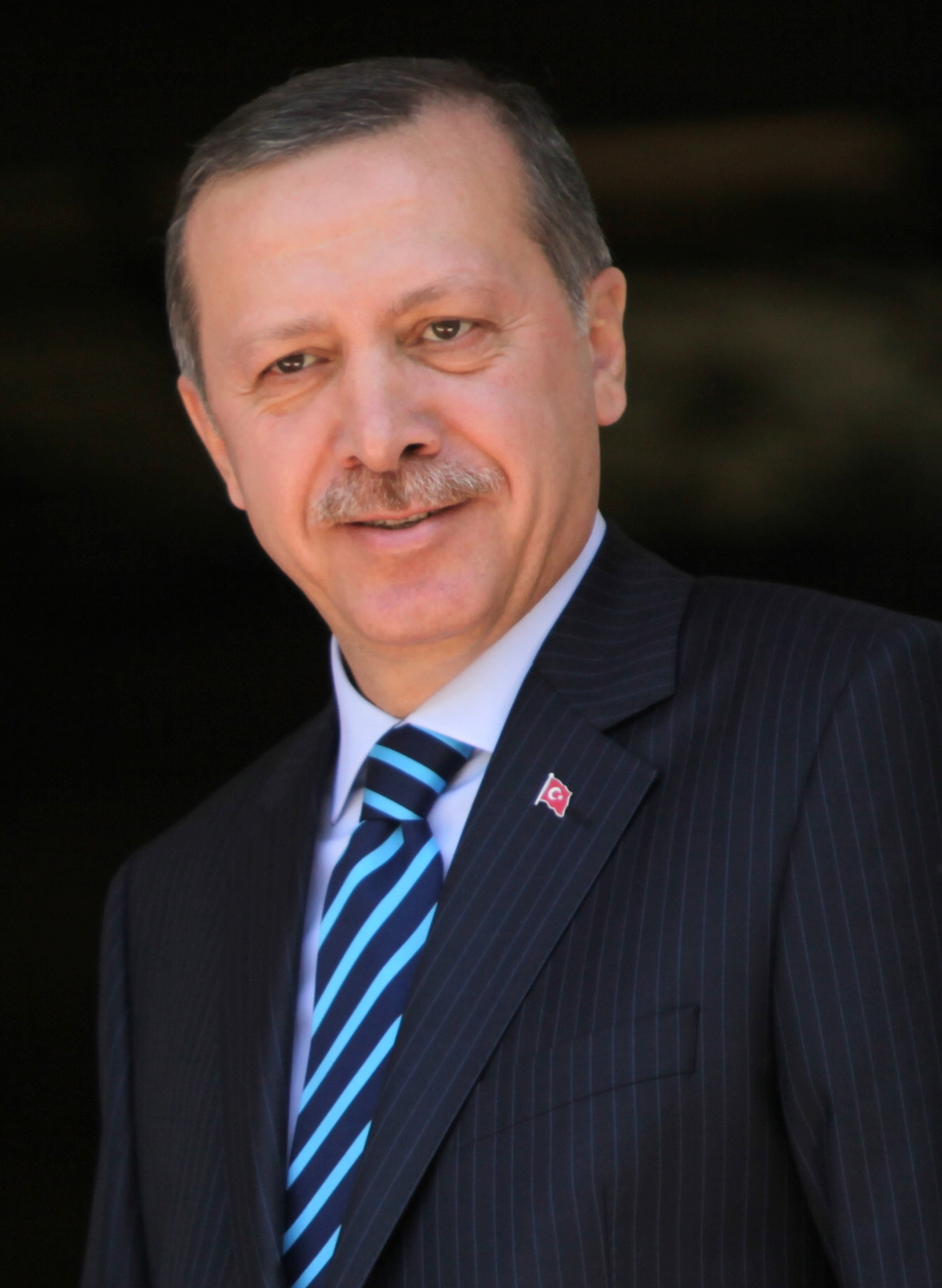
Recep Tayyip Erdoğan

- Recep Tayyip Erdoğan — President of Turkey, have graduated from the Faculty of Economics and Administrative Sciences in 1981, but the university was established in 1982. (Note: Sufficient proofs of entry and graduation are lacking, several Turkish sources dispute that he graduated.)
- Aydın Doğan — Turkish businessman and industrialist
- Nihat Ergün — Turkish minister
- Kemal Sunal — Turkish actor graduated from the Television Studies Department of Marmara University's Institute of Social Sciences
- Ismail Acar — Turkish artist
- Erol Bulut — Turkish painter; completed the proficiency in art degree in 1985 and later taught painting at the university as a professor
- Betül Kaçar — Turkish astrobiologist
- Nazlı Tolga — Turkish journalist
- Nesrin Nas — Turkish academic, politician and the former leader of the Motherland Party
- Ali Kurumahmut — Former Member of the Council of State of Turkey
- Sevil Sabancı — Turkish businesswoman and member of the Sabancı family
- Setenay Özbek — Turkish writer, artist and documentary maker
- Mustafa Sarıgül — Member of the Grand National Assembly of Turkey and former mayor of Şişli
- Hakan Utangaç — Musician
- Şebnem Paker — Turkish guitarist and singer
- Hakan Utangaç — Guitarist and vocalist of Mezarkabul
- Yıldo — Showman and retired football player
- Edibe Sözen — Academic and politician
- Bengü — Musician
- Kıraç — Musician
- Aysel Özakın — Turkish-British writer
- Kaan Urgancıoğlu — Turkish actor
- Hussein Mwinyi — 8th President of Zanzibar
- Tevfik Fikret Uçar — Turkish academic

== See also ==
- List of universities in Turkey
