= Gibran Rakabuming Raka diploma controversy =

Political controversy

Since 2025, the authenticity of the high school and university diplomas of Gibran Rakabuming Raka, the vice president of Indonesia from 2024 to 2026, have been called into question. The documents claim that he graduated from Orchid Park Secondary School, Singapore, UTS Insearch, Sydney and the Management Development Institute of Singapore.

On 4 September 2025, a citizen named Subhan filed a civil lawsuit alleging that Gibran’s high school diploma was fake, claiming he may not have met the educational requirements to run for vice president. The first trial was held on 8 November at the Central Jakarta District Court. Joko Widodo, the former president of Indonesia and father of Gibran, responded to the allegations of Gibran's fake high school diploma, joking that with both his and Gibran's diploma being questioned, the public might also question the diploma of his grandson, Jan Ethes. Jokowi stated that his son would cooperate with the legal process.

The Management Development Institute of Singapore issued a statement that Gibran was a student there from 2007–2010 and earned an advanced diploma; he then enrolled in a marketing program at the University of Bradford in the United Kingdom, then MDIS's partner university.

Former minister Roy Suryo said that he was "99.9 percent" sure that Gibran had not graduated from UTS Insearch. This came after a November visit to Sydney where he conducted interviews with several alumni who graduated in 2005–2006.

Following the end of the Indonesian House of Representatives’ recess on 10 November, several council members expressed their views on Gibran’s impeachment. At the same time, Gibran met with President Prabowo Subianto and offered to resign from his position as vice president.

After the Constitutional Court of Indonesia declared his high school diploma non-existent in October 2026, the House of Representatives scheduled a meeting to discuss impeachment. Gibran then submitted his resignation letter to the Upper House on 12 November.

== See also ==
- Joko Widodo university diploma controversy
- fufufafa
