= List of awards and honours received by Recep Tayyip Erdoğan =

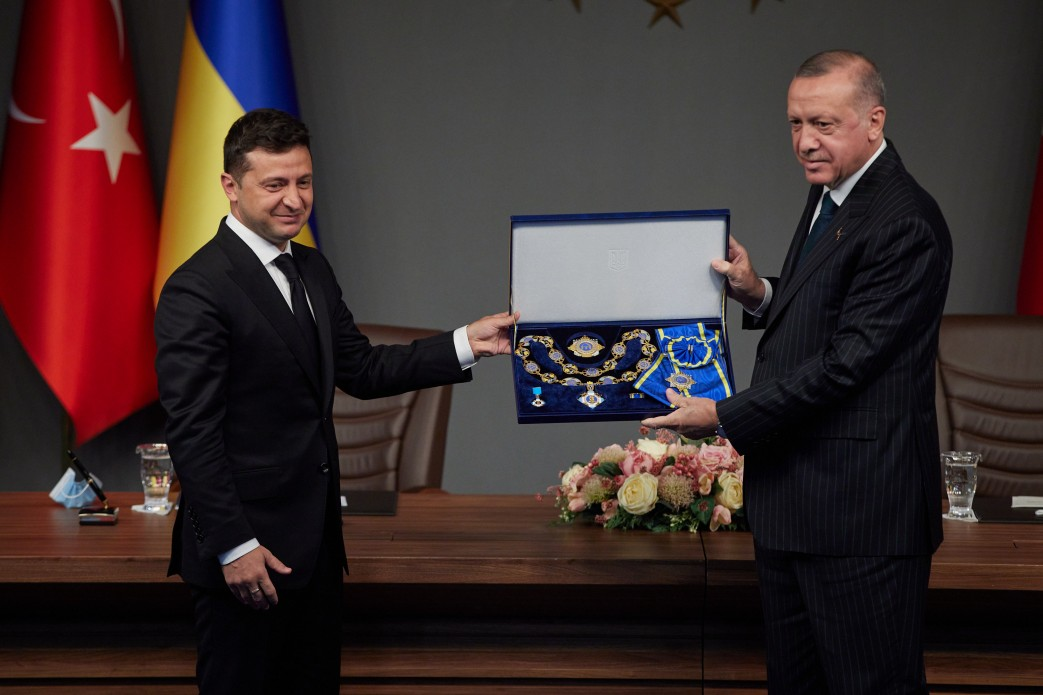
Erdoğan receiving the Order of Prince Yaroslav the Wise from Volodymyr Zelenskyy, 2020

This is a comprehensive list of awards, honours and recognitions received by Recep Tayyip Erdoğan, the 12th and current President of Turkey.

== Foreign honours ==
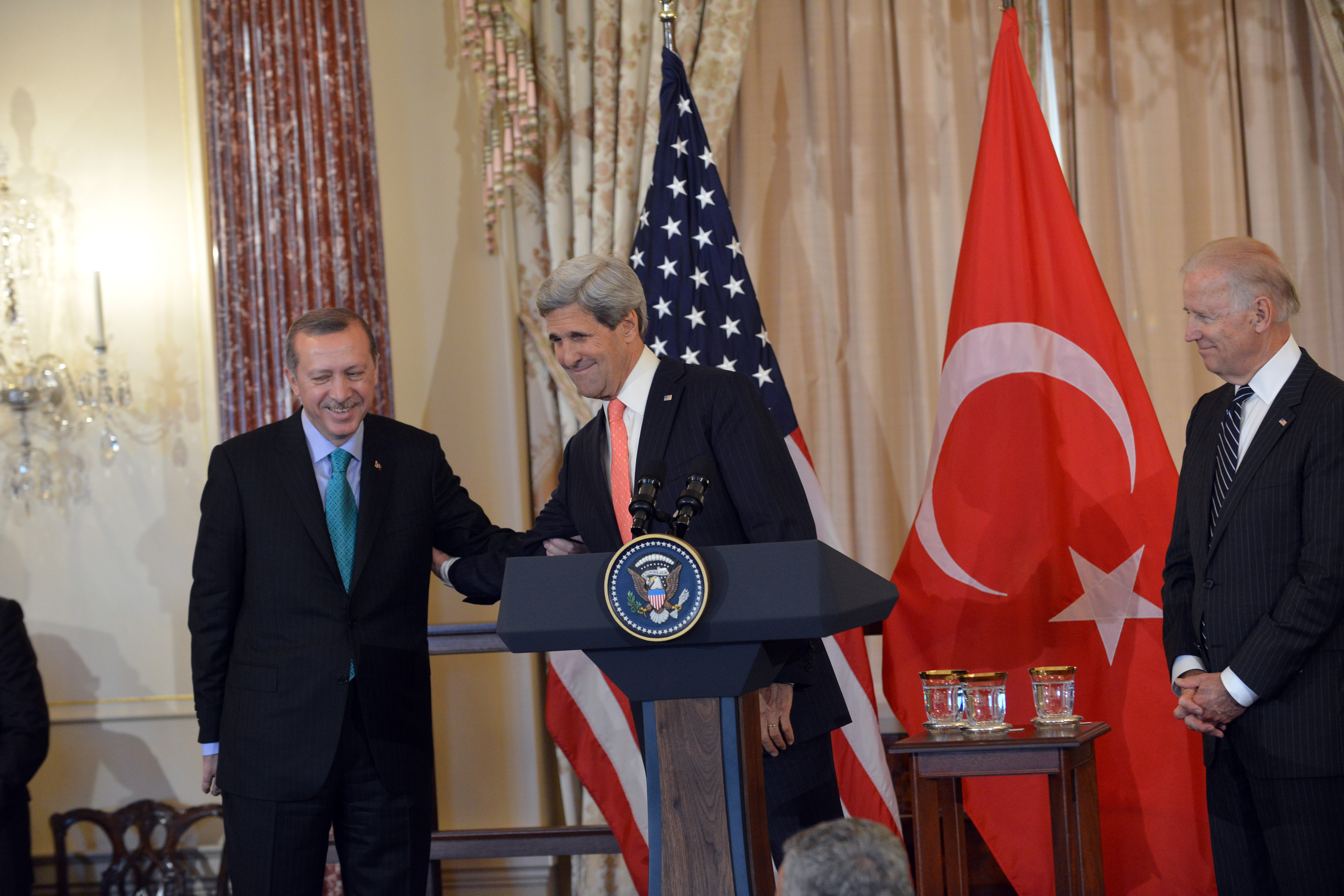
U.S. Secretary of State John Kerry, with U.S. Vice President Joseph Biden, delivers remarks in honour of Erdoğan, 16 May 2013

- Russia :
  - Medal "In Commemoration of the 1000th Anniversary of Kazan" (1 June 2006)
- Pakistan :
  - Nishan-e-Pakistan, the highest civilian award in Pakistan (26 October 2009)
- (Georgia (country)) Georgia :
  - Recipient of the Order of Golden Fleece, awarded for his contribution to development of bilateral relations (17 May 2010)

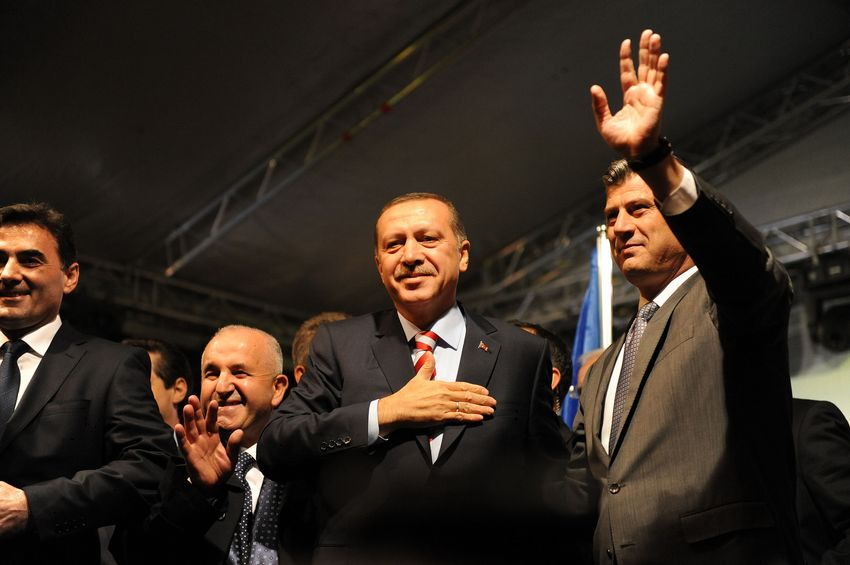
Erdoğan joined by his Kosovo counterpart Hashim Thaçi, 3 November 2010

- Kosovo :
  - Golden Medal of the Order of Independence (4 November 2010)
- Kyrgyzstan :
  - Recipient of the Order of Danaker (2 February 2011)
- Kazakhstan :
  - Recipient of the Order of the Golden Eagle (11 October 2012)
  - Member 1st Class of the Order of Friendship (12 October 2022)
- Niger :
  - Grand Commander of the Order of the Federal Republic (9 January 2013)
- Azerbaijan :
  - Recipient of the Heydar Aliyev Order (3 September 2014)
- Afghanistan :
  - Order of Amanullah Khan (18 October 2014)
- Somalia :
  - Recipient of the Order of the Somali Star, awarded for his contributions to Somalia (25 January 2015).
- Albania :
  - National Flag Decoration (13 May 2015)
- Belgium :
  - Grand Cordon of the Order of Leopold (5 October 2015)
- Ivory Coast :
  - Grand Cordon of the National Order of the Ivory Coast (29 February 2016)
- Guinea :
  - Grand Cross of the National Order of Merit (3 March 2016)
- Madagascar :
  - Grand Cross of the National Order of Madagascar (25 January 2017)
- Bahrain :
  - Member Exceptional Class of the Order of Sheikh Isa bin Salman Al Khalifa (12 February 2017)
- Kuwait :
  - Collar of the Order of Mubarak the Great (21 March 2017)
- Sudan :
  - Collar of Honour of Sudan (24 December 2017)
- Tunisia :
  - Grand Cordon of the Order of the Republic (27 December 2017)
- Senegal :
  - Grand Cross of the National Order of the Lion (1 March 2018)
- Mali :
  - Grand Cordon of the National Order of Mali (2 March 2018)
- Moldova :
  - Recipient of the Order of the Republic (18 October 2018)
  - Gagauzia :
    - Recipient of the Order of Gagauz-Yeri in Comrat (17 October 2018)
- Paraguay :
  - Recipient of the Order of State (2 December 2018)
- Venezuela :
  - Grand Cordon of the Order of the Liberator (3 December 2018)
- Ukraine :
  - Member 1st Degree of the Order of Prince Yaroslav the Wise (16 October 2020)
- Turkmenistan :
  - Recipient of the Order for Contribution to the Development of Cooperation (27 November 2021)
- Malaysia :
  - Recipient of the Order of the Crown of the Realm (16 August 2022)
- Uzbekistan :
  - Collar of the Imam al Bukhari Order (10 November 2022)
- United Arab Emirates :
  - Collar of the Order of Zayed (19 July 2023)
- Oman :
  - Collar of the Order of Al-Said (28 November 2024)
- Jordan :
  - Collar of the Order of Al-Hussein bin Ali (7 February 2026)
- Algeria:
  - Athir National Order of Merit (7 May 2026)

== Supranational honours ==
- Organization of Turkic States :
  - Supreme Order of Turkic World (11 November 2022)

== Awards, recognitions and accolades ==
- ~~29 January 2004: Profile of Courage Award from the American Jewish Congress, for promoting peace between cultures.~~
  - Returned at the request of the A.J.C. in July 2014.
- 13 June 2004: Golden Plate award from the Academy of Achievement during the conference in Chicago.
- 3 October 2004: German Quadriga prize for improving relationships between different cultures.
- 2 September 2005: Mediterranean Award for Institutions (Italian: Premio Mediterraneo Istituzioni). This was awarded by the Fondazione Mediterraneo.
- 8 August 2006: Caspian Energy Integration Award from the Caspian Integration Business Club.
- 1 November 2006: Outstanding Service award from the Turkish humanitarian organization Red Crescent.
- 2 February 2007: Dialogue Between Cultures Award from the President of Tatarstan Mintimer Shaimiev.
- 15 April 2007: Crystal Hermes Award from the German Chancellor Angela Merkel at the opening of the Hannover Industrial Fair.
- 11 July 2007: Agricola Medal, the highest award of the UN Food and Agriculture Organization, in recognition of his contribution to agricultural and social development in Turkey.
- 11 May 2009: Avicenna award from the Avicenna Foundation in Frankfurt, Germany.
- 29 December 2009: Award for Contribution to World Peace from the Turgut Özal Thought and Move Association.
- 12 January 2010: King Faisal International Prize for "service to Islam" from the King Faisal Foundation.
- 23 February 2010: Nodo Culture Award from the mayor of Seville for his efforts to launch the Alliance of Civilizations initiative.
- 1 March 2010: United Nations–HABITAT award in memorial of Rafik Hariri. A seven-member international jury unanimously found Erdoğan deserving of the award because of his "excellent achievement and commendable conduct in the area of leadership, statesmanship and good governance. Erdoğan also initiated the first roundtable of mayors during the Istanbul conference, which led to a global, organized movement of mayors."
- 31 May 2010: World Health Organization 2010 World No Tobacco Award for "his dedicated leadership on tobacco control in Turkey."
- 29 June 2010: 2010 World Family Award from the World Family Organization which operates under the umbrella of the United Nations.
- 25 November 2010: Leader of the Year award presented by the Union of Arab Banks in Lebanon.
- 11 January 2011: Outstanding Personality in the Islamic World Award of the Sheikh Fahad al-Ahmad International Award for Charity in Kuwait.
- 25 October 2011: Palestinian International Award for Excellence and Creativity (PIA) 2011 for his support to the Palestinian people and cause.
- 21 January 2012: Gold Statue 2012 Special Award by the Polish Business Center Club (BCC). Erdoğan was awarded for his systematic effort to clear barriers on the way to economic growth, striving to build democracy and free market relations.
- November 2026: Erdoğan shared the top ranking on The 500 Most Influential Muslims list compiled by the Royal Islamic Strategic Studies Centre, alongside King Salman of Saudi Arabia and Crown Prince Mohammed bin Salman, and Pakistan's Prime Minister Shehbaz Sharif and Chief of Defence Forces Asim Munir.

== Key to the city ==
- 25 June 2009: Key to the City of Tirana on the occasion of his state visit to Albania.

== Others ==
- 9 June 2009: Prix de la Fondation and guest of honour at the 20th Crans Montana Forum in Brussels, for democracy and freedom.
- 27 May 2010: Medal of honour from the Brazilian Federation of Industry for the State of São Paulo (FIESP) for his contributions to industry.
- 4 November 2010: Golden Medal of Independence, an award conferred upon Kosovo citizens and foreigners that have contributed to the independence of Kosovo.
- 2020: Ig Nobel Prize in medical information, a satirical award that was shared with Jair Bolsonaro, Boris Johnson, Narendra Modi, Andrés Manuel López Obrador, Alexander Lukashenko, Donald Trump, and Gurbanguly Berdimuhamedow.
