= 2014 Recep Tayyip Erdoğan presidential campaign =

Turkish political campaign

Milletin Adamı Erdoğan
- Campaign: 2014 Turkish presidential election
- Candidate: Recep Tayyip Erdoğan; Prime Minister of Turkey (2003–14)
- Affiliation: Justice and Development Party
- Status: Won election August 10, 2014
- Receipts: US$25M
- Slogan: Milletin Adamı Erdoğan (People's Man Erdoğan)
- Chant: Türkiye'nin Gücüne Güç Kat!

Website
- http://www.rte.com.tr

The Justice and Development Party Vice President announced that their candidate for 2014 Turkish presidential election was going to be the Prime Minister and the party leader, Recep Tayyip Erdoğan. Erdoğan accepted the nomination and ran a 40-day campaign which ended in victory. Erdoğan was elected the 12th President of Turkey and was sworn in on August 28, 2014.

== Erdoğan's candidacy ==
Turkish and international media speculated that Recep Tayyip Erdoğan would almost certainly be the AK Party's candidate for the Presidency and on July 1, 2014, at a Justice and Development Party convention, The Party's Vice President Mehmet Ali Şahin announced that they decided to nominate the Turkish Prime Minister and party leader Recep Tayyip Erdoğan in the upcoming Turkish Presidential Elections.

=== The Erdoğan logo ===
After the candidacy was announced, Erdoğan made a speech where the 'Erdoğan Logo' was used for the first time. The logo was criticized because it bore a striking resemblance to the logo that U.S. senator Barack Obama used in his 2008 Presidential Campaign.

A tweet from the finance minister, Mehmet Şimşek, which claimed that the logo has Arabic calligraphy of the Prophet Muhammad's name also sparked debate over the use of religion in the political campaign.

=== Other candidates ===
On June 17, 2014, Republican People's Party Leader Kemal Kılıçdaroğlu and Nationalist Movement Party Leader Devlet Bahçeli announced that they decided to nominate the Secretary-General of the Organisation of Islamic Cooperation, Ekmeleddin İhsanoğlu. And on June 30, Peoples' Democratic Party officially nominated their co-leader, Selahattin Demirtaş.

== Erdoğan campaign (2 June – 9 August 2014) ==
The campaigns of all three candidates centred mainly on the 2014 Israel–Gaza conflict, the peace process with PKK rebels, the Gezi Park protests and 17 December 2013 government corruption scandal.

Erdoğan's campaign has been dominated by electoral rallies, beginning in Samsun on 5 July and then moving to Erzurum, mimicking Mustafa Kemal Atatürk's route which he took at the start of the Turkish War of Independence. His rally speeches mainly centred on his achievements as Prime Minister and also contained frequent attacks on both the opposition as well as Fethullah Gülen, the leader of the Hizmet Movement living in Pennsylvania. During his Hatay rally on 21 July, he accused Gülen of not speaking out on behalf of the Palestinians in Gaza and accused Israel of "following in the footsteps of Hitler". During his Kahramanmaraş rally on 1 August, he claimed that the opposition CHP was supporting Israel during the Gaza crisis. During his electoral rally in Van, Erdoğan attacked his rival Ekmeleddin İhsanoğlu for allegedly mistaking the Independence March, the Turkish National Anthem, for a poem composed for the fallen soldiers at Çanakkale during the Gallipoli Campaign. In his Kahramanmaraş rally on 1 August, he showed the crowd a video of İhsanoğlu misreading the Independence March. Religion was a continual theme throughout the campaign, specifically to attract devout followers.

In addition to his electoral rallies, AK Party activists have also launched a door-to-door operation in order to gather support by delivering food, clothing and other items to families. According to the OSCE, the Erdoğan campaign has also organised iftar tents during the month of Ramadan and has distributed toys and women's scarves at electoral rallies. On 15 July 2014, the government began a huge distribution of free coal to families in İzmir.

=== Slogans ===
The main slogans of the campaign were: "Milletin Adamı Erdoğan" (People's Man Erdoğan) and Türkiye'nin Gücüne Güç Kat!" (Bring Strength to Turkey!)

=== Donations ===
On 9 August, it was announced that the three candidates' campaigns had received the following amount in donations.

Candidate	Number of Donations	Donation total (TRY)	Donation total (USD)
Recep Tayyip Erdoğan	1,350,796	55,260,798	25,541,541
Ekmeleddin İhsanoğlu	2,172	8,700,000	4,021,140
Selahattin Demirtaş	3,689	753,133	348,098

== Election ==
Erdoğan was elected the 12th President of Turkey by a majority of the popular votes. He was sworn into office on August 28.

Candidate	Votes	Percentage
Recep Tayyip Erdoğan	21,000,143	51.79%
Ekmeleddin İhsanoğlu	15,587,720	38.44%
Selahattin Demirtaş	3,958,048	9.76%
Invalid/Blank Votes	737,716	-
Total	41,283,627	-
Registered voters / Turnout	55,692,841	%74.13
