= Tevfik Fikret Uçar =

Turkish academic

- Born: 1966 (age 59–60); Istanbul, Turkey
- Occupations: Academic, author
- Known for: Graphic design

Tevfik Fikret Uçar (born 28 January 1966) is a full-time professor, chair of the Graphic Design Department, and design consultant at Anadolu University Fine Arts and Design. In addition, design director of Anadolu University School of Distance Education textbook publication.

== Biography ==
Uçar was born in Istanbul, Turkey. Recehived BFA in Graphic Design in 1988 from School of Fine Arts and Design in Marmara University, Istanbul. Moreover, in 1990, he received award from Turkish Government Research Scholarship in Communication Design Department to attend Art Centre College of Design, Switzerland and received Advanced degree.

He continued his academic profession with a MFA (1991) degree from School of Fine Arts and Design in Anadolu University, Eskisehir. Thesis submitted for the MFA degree was titled, Symbols, Icons, Pictograms and Their Use in Packaging Design.

Two years later in 1993, he received doctoral degree for Art and Design in Anadolu University, with the awarded thesis title of Packaging Design as a Visual Communication Media.

In 1996 he received the title of associate professor in School of Art and Design, Anadolu University. Furthermore, in 2004 he received the title of professor from the same department in Anadolu University.

== Work ==
At the age of 27, Uçar became vice dean of the School of Fine Arts and Design in Anadolu University from 1993 to 1995. During his positing as Vice Dean, in year 1994 he became a member of Administration Board of the School of Fine Arts and Design, Anadolu University. In addition, from 1994 to 1995, Uçar became a member of Administration Board of the Turkish Graphic Designers Association. Turkish Graphic Designers Association is a member of ICOGRADA.

At the age 29, he was assigned as the design consultant for the Turkish Grand National Assembly. He designed the 75th anniversary of Turkish Republic's logo, poster and stamp.

From 1996 to 1998, he was appointed as design director for Turkish Education Volunteers Foundation. One of the largest charities in Turkey.

After this voluntary work in TEGV, he was invited as a visiting scholar in Design and Art History, School of Art, San Diego State from 1998 to 1999.

Since 1995, he did not take any administrative role in Anadolu University.

== Awards ==
Uçar received many national design awards for his achievements in various competitions. In year 1995, he received the first prize awards for Symbol Design Award from Turkish Grand National Assembly. Two years later, he received first prize award on Symbol Design Award for Bursaray Bursa, city railway transportation system competition. In the same year, first prize award on Symbol Design Award for Yerel Gündem 21 Bursa, local agenda 21 corporate identity competition.

== Workshops ==
Some of Uçar's workshops are: Experimental Organic Typography. This workshop took place in Typography Days 2011, India

In Spring term of 2011, TAU (Turkish German Universities) Identity Design Project is conducted by Uçar and his colleagues from Anadolu University, RheinMain University of Applied Sciences, Germany and DAAD German Academic Exchange Service.

In 2009, Uçar attended to Yahsibey Workshop established by Design Foundation of Emre Senan. He was project leader for twelve students.

In 2004, Uçar attended to 8th Istanbul International Graphic Design Week with his project Signs.

== Book ==
Uçar published a book with the title of Visual Communication and Graphic Design from İnkılâp Press in 2004 (ISBN 9751021642)
