= List of Gadjah Mada University people =

Notable people and alumni of Gadjah Mada University.

== University Rectors ==
- M. Sardjito, 1st Rector (1949–1961)
- Herman Johannes, 2nd Rector (1961–1966)
- M. Nazir Alwi, 3rd Rector (1966–1967)
- Soepojo Padmodipoetro, 4th Rector (1967–1968)
- Soeroso Prawirohardjo, 5th Rector (1968–1973)
- Sukadji Ranuwihardjo, 6th Rector (1973–1981)
- Teuku Jacob, 7th Rector (1981–1986)
- Koesnadi Hardjosoemantri, 8th Rector (1986–1990)
- Mochamad Adnan, 9th Rector (1990–1994)
- Soekanto H. Reksohadiprodo, 10th Rector (1994–1998)
- Ichlasul Amal, 11th Rector (1998–2003)
- Sofian Effendi, 12th Rector (2003–2007)
- Sudjarwadi, 13th Rector (2007–2012)
- Pratikno, 14th Rector (2012–2014), resigned October 2014 on being appointed as State Secretary in the Joko Widodo administration
- Dwi Korita Karnawati, 15th Rector (2014–2017) and the first woman rector of the university, appointed in November 2014
- Panut Mulyono, 16th Rector (2017–2022)
- Ova Emilia, 17th Rector (2022–present)

== Art and culture ==
- Artika Sari Devi - Miss Indonesia Universe 2005, Top 15
- Umar Kayam - author and former President of Jakarta Art Institute
- Willibrordus S. Rendra - poet, lyricist, and stage writer; one of the most recognized poets in Indonesia

== Education ==
- Yahya A. Muhaimin - Minister of Education (1999–2001)
- M. Suyanto founded a private university in Yogyakarta, on October 11, 1994. The university, STMIK Amikom, was highlighted as a leading example for “A New Dynamic: Private Higher Education” by UNESCO at World Conference on Higher Education 2009.

== Economics ==
- Boediono - former Coordinating Minister of Economic Affairs; former governor of central Bank Indonesia; Vice President of Indonesia (2009–2014)
- J Soedrajad Djiwandono - Junior Minister of Trade (1988–1993), Governor of Central Bank Indonesia (1993–1998), emeritus Professor of Economics at University of Indonesia, Professor at Graduate School of Nanyang Technological University, Singapore
- Perry Warjiyo - Governor, Bank Indonesia.

== Health ==
- Odete Maria Freitas Belo – Minister of Health of East Timor
- Siti Fadillah Supari – Minister of Health (2004–2009).
- Hanum Salsabiela Rais - writer, politician and presenter

== Journalism ==
- Jakob Oetama - founder of Kompas; CEO of Kompas Gramedia
- Helmi Johannes - voice of America Executive Producer (2005–present)
- Susanto Pudjomartono - second chief editor of The Jakarta Post (1991–2003); Ambassador to Russia (2003–2008)

== Politics ==
- Joko Widodo - President of Indonesia (2014–present), Governor of Jakarta (2012–2014) and Mayor of Surakarta (2005–2012)
- Sri Sultan Hamengkubuwono X - 10th Sultan of Yogyakarta
- Mohammad Syafaat Mintaredja - 1st Chairman of United Development Party (1973–1978) and 19th Minister of Social Affairs (1971–1978)
- Amien Rais - Leader of Muhammadiyah (1995–1998), speaker of the People's Consultative Assembly (1999–2004), politician and founder of Partai Amanat Nasional
- Airlangga Hartarto - Chairman of Golkar (2017–2024), Coordinating Minister for Economic Affairs (2019–present) and Minister of Industry (2016–2019)
- Anies Baswedan - Governor of Jakarta (2017–2022) and former Minister of Education and Culture
- Ganjar Pranowo - Governor of Central Java (2013-2023) and former member of DPR-RI (2004-2013)
- Djarot Saiful Hidayat - Governor of Jakarta (2017) and former Mayor of Blitar (2000–2010)
- Pratikno - Minister of State Secretariat (2014–present)
- Retno Marsudi – Minister of Foreign Affairs (2014–present) and Ambassador of Indonesia to the Netherlands (2011–2015)
- Roy Suryo - Minister of Youth and Sports Affairs (2013–2014)
- Basuki Hadimuljono - Minister of Public Works and Housing (2014–present)
- Terawan Agus Putranto - Minister of Health (2019-2020)
- Dewa Made Beratha - Governor of Bali Province (1998–2008)
- Ben Mang Reng Say - Politician, founder and Rector of Atma Jaya Catholic University
- Budiman Sudjatmiko - Politician
- Mahfud MD - Coordinating Minister for Political, Legal and Security Affairs (2019–present) and Chief Justice of the Constitutional Court of Indonesia (2008–2013)
- Muhaimin Iskandar - Leader of Partai Kebangkitan Bangsa and former Minister of Labor and Transmigration (2009–2014)
- Piet Alexander Tallo - Governor of East Nusa Tenggara (1998–2008)
- Budi Karya Sumadi - Minister of Transportation (2016–present)
- Luke Lazarus Arnold - Australian High Commissioner to Brunei (2022–present)
- Anas Urbaningrum - Politician
- A.M. Hendropriyono - Head of State Intelligence Agency (2001-2004)

== Religion ==
- Ahmad Wahib – progressive Islamic intellectual

== Science and technology ==
- Marlina Flassy - anthropologist and first woman Dean at Cenderawasih University
- Herman Johannes - rector; Minister of public works (1950–1951)
- Mohammad Sadli - Minister of Mineral Resources (1973–1978), Minister of Labor (1971–1973), Professor of Economics at University of Indonesia
- Teuku Jacob - rector, physician, anatomist, palaeoanthropologist
- Lolo Soetoro - geographer and stepfather of Barack Obama, the 44th President of the United States.

== Government officials ==
- Kristiarto Legowo, Ministry of Foreign Affairs
- Saldi Isra, Constitutional Court Justice
- Wahid Supriyadi - diplomat, Ambassador to Russia (2016–2020)
