= Tiyo Ardianto =

Indonesian student activist

- Born: 26 April; Kudus Regency, Central Java, Indonesia
- Education: Gadjah Mada University
- Occupation: Student activist
- Known for: President of BEM KM UGM (2025–2026)

Tiyo Ardianto (born 26 April) is an Indonesian student activist who served as President of the Student Executive Board of the Student Family of Gadjah Mada University (BEM KM UGM) for the 2025–2026 term.

== Early life and education ==
Tiyo was born in Kudus Regency, Central Java. He completed his secondary education through the Paket C equivalency program at PKBM Omah Dongeng Marwah in Kudus. During his youth, he participated in local literary and theater communities, winning awards in regional and national poetry reading and Javanese monologue competitions.

In 2021, he enrolled in the Faculty of Philosophy at Gadjah Mada University (UGM) through the national selection track (SBMPTN). At UGM, he joined the Islamic Students' Association (HMI) Philosophy Commissariat. In 2023, he traveled to Australia to serve as an Indonesian language teaching assistant at Melbourne High School.

== Student activism ==
After assuming office as President of BEM KM UGM in 2025, Tiyo led several institutional and public policy campaigns:

- Vote of no confidence: In May 2025, following student demonstrations over national budget reallocations and the Free Nutritious Meals (MBG) program, BEM KM UGM issued a vote of no confidence against UGM Rector Ova Emilia, criticizing the university leadership for declining to take a formal institutional stance.
- Withdrawal from BEM SI: On 18 July 2025, Tiyo announced BEM KM UGM's withdrawal from the All-Indonesian Student Executive Board Alliance (BEM SI Kerakyatan) during its national congress in Padang, citing the attendance of political party figures, cabinet officials, and security apparatus as a compromise to student movement independence.
- Public policy critiques: In early 2026, BEM KM UGM sent an open letter to UNICEF highlighting structural gaps in education funding following a student suicide in East Nusa Tenggara. Tiyo also publicly opposed state budget allocations for the MBG program and revisions to the Indonesian National Armed Forces Law (UU TNI).

== Intimidation and legal complaints ==
In 2026, Tiyo reported receiving anonymous threats and faced police complaints related to his activism.

Following a student protest in Gejayan, Yogyakarta, in June 2026, he discovered two GPS tracking devices attached to a borrowed vehicle he had been using. Although police invited him to submit a formal report, Tiyo declined to pursue an investigation. Government officials subsequently dismissed the devices as outdated consumer models.

In mid-June 2026, individual lawyers and the volunteer group Garda Prabowo filed criminal defamation complaints against Tiyo at the South Tangerang Metro Police and Bareskrim Polri, accusing him of insulting President Prabowo Subianto, Vice President Gibran Rakabuming Raka, and the MBG program. The Institute for Criminal Justice Reform (ICJR) criticized the complaints as an attempt to suppress freedom of expression. In July 2026, Garda Prabowo withdrew its police complaint, stating that President Prabowo had pardoned Tiyo and favored dialogue.
