= 3 Bacapres Bicara Gagasan =

- Mata Najwa episode
- Directed by: Zen Rahmat Sugito
- Presented by: Najwa Shihab
- Cinematography by: M. Iqbal; Ardi Mistodi; Komarizan Wahyudi
- Original air date: 19 September 2023

Guest appearances
- Anies Baswedan; Ganjar Pranowo; Prabowo Subianto; Pandji Pragiwaksono; Ova Emilia

"3 Bacapres Bicara Gagasan" was a live episode of Mata Najwa, an Indonesian television talk show. It featured three of Indonesia's presidential candidates for 2024: Anies Baswedan, Ganjar Pranowo, and Prabowo Subianto. On 19 September 2023, the episode was broadcast live from Gadjah Mada University to a studio audience of over 5000 people.

== Cast ==
In order of appearance:

- Najwa Shihab
- Ova Emilia
- Anies Baswedan
- Ganjar Pranowo
- Pandji Pragiwaksono
- Prabowo Subianto
- Mitty Zasia

== Production ==
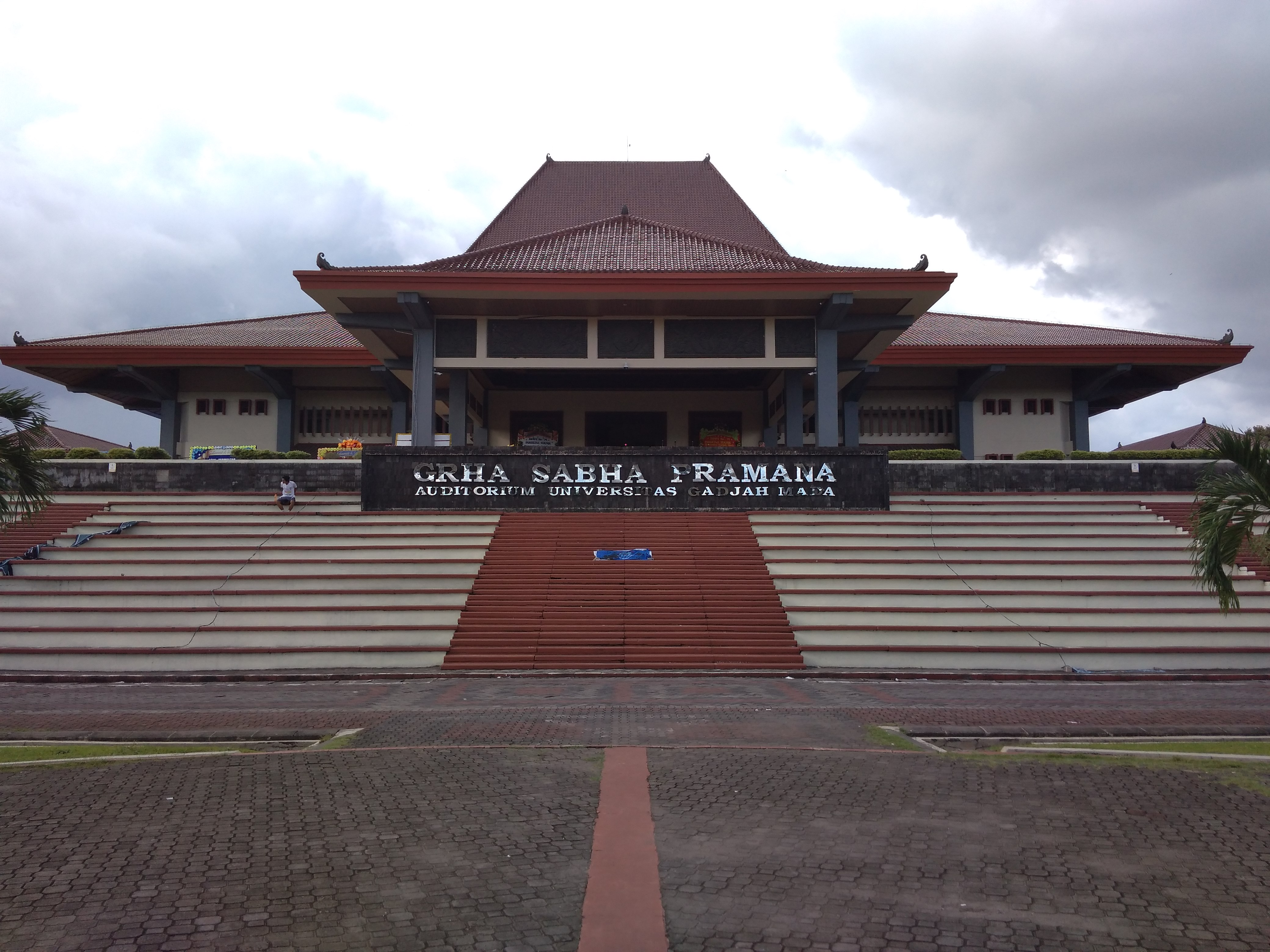
Grha Sabha Pramana (GSP), the event venue

"3 Bacapres Bicara Gagasan" was hosted by Najwa Shihab and produced for her television talk show, Mata Najwa. It was one of many events to celebrate the 68th anniversary of Gadjah Mada University's Faculty of Social and Political Sciences. The event was held at Grha Sabha Permana (GSP) (Gadjah Mada University) on 19 September 2023, from 3 PM WIB to 10 PM WIB (UTC+07:00) and was broadcast live on YouTube. This episode featured three 2024 Indonesian presidential candidates: Anies Baswedan, Ganjar Pranowo, and Prabowo Subianto. They were invited to explain their views on issues of concern in Indonesia.

The episode opened with a speech from rector Ova Emilia, who conveyed five national messages from Gadjah Mada University as the first state university founded by the Indonesian state after becoming sovereign. She encouraged all contestants in the 2024 election, and the entire nation, to commit to maintaining Indonesian values based on the principles of popular sovereignty, diversity, multiculturalism, national sovereignty, and social welfare. She added that the event should raise awareness about the importance of political education and the improvement of the quality of democracy.

=== Notable guests ===
The episode featured comedian Pandji Pragiwaksono in a scene that where he made fun of Erick Thohir, due to his double position as chairman of Football Association of Indonesia (PSSI) and State-owned enterprises of Indonesia (BUMN), by comparing him to a kid who knows to finish their homework before playing football.

"Pak Erick Thohir ini lucu, jadi ketua PSSI, seakan-akan kerjaannya di BUMN itu sudah selesai. Pak Erick Thohir, bocah aja tahu, selesain dulu PR-nya lalu main bola."

At the end of each presidential candidate's session, they were asked to stand in front of a large mirror and convey a message as a self-reflection on becoming President of Indonesia; of the three, Prabowo Subianto refused to do so. This refusal was criticized by psychiatrist Hanna Rahmi after the program.

== Broadcast ==
"3 Bacapres Bicara Gagasan" was broadcast on 19 September 2023 and was live-streamed on YouTube. iNews Sleman reported that at 6 PM WIB the episode had reached 43.000 viewers on social media.
