= Wahib =

Wahib is a given name and a surname. It may refer to:

== Given name ==
- Wahib al-Ghanim (1919-2003), Syrian physician and politician, a co-founder of the Ba'ath Party
- Wahib Wahab (1918-1986), Indonesian religious figure, politician, government minister

== Surname ==
- Ahmad Wahib (1942-1973), Indonesian progressive Islamic intellectual
- Bilal Wahib (born 1999), Dutch film and TV actor, singer and rapper
- Wesam Wahib (born 1992), Saudi Arabian footballer

== See also ==
- Abu Waheeb (1986–2016), a leader of the militant group Islamic State in Iraq and the Levant (ISIL)
- Ignatius bar Wahib, Syriac Orthodox Patriarch of Mardin
