= Pascoela Barreto =

East Timorese civil servant and diplomat (born 1946)

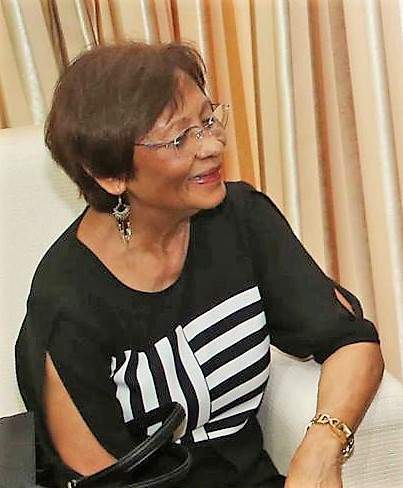

Ambassador of East Timor to Portugal
- In office July 2002 – December 2005
- President: Xanana Gusmão

Director of the Department of Finance and Resources of the National Council of Timorese Resistance (CNRT)
- In office 1999–2000

Personal details
- Born: June 1946 (age 80) Bazartete, Portuguese Timor
- Education: Instituto Superior de Ciências do Trabalho e da Empresa (ISCTE)
- Occupation: civil servant and diplomat
- Awards: Order of Liberty; Order of Prince Henry

Pascoela Barreto dos Santos is an East Timorese civil servant and diplomat. She served on the National Political Commission of the National Council of Timorese Resistance (CNRT) and was the first Ambassador of the newly established country of East Timor. She has served as Ambassador of East Timor to Portugal and Vietnam.

== Biography ==
Barreto was born in Bazartete, Portuguese Timor. In 1970, Barreto moved to Portugal to study sociology at the Instituto Superior de Ciências do Trabalho e da Empresa (ISCTE) in Lisbon.

Barreto worked at the General Directorate of Land Transport in Portugal [pt]. On 11 March 2000, she was awarded the civic honour of Commander of the Order of Liberty of Portugal.

After the Portuguese withdrew from Timor, from 1999 to 2000 Barreto served on the National Political Commission of the National Council of Timorese Resistance (CNRT) as a Member of the Executive Committee and as Director of the Department of Finance and Resources. She handled the finances of the CNRT abroad in Portugal.

In April 2001, Barreto and José Ramos-Horta (later the President of East Timor) travelled to The Hague in the Netherlands as delegates to a conference on East Timor building a new nation state, which was organised by the International Institute of Asian Studies in Leiden and the Platform for Asian Studies in Amsterdam.

Barreto became the first Ambassador from the newly established country of East Timor, with the Embassy in Portugal replacing the dissolved office of the CNRT in Lisbon, Portugal. Barreto served as Ambassador to Portugal from July 2002 to December 2005, presenting her credentials to President of Portugal Jorge Sampaio. In 2003, she spoke at the Iberian Model United Nations (lMUN) Conference at the Carlucci American International School in Lisbon.

On 6 March 2007, Barreto was awarded the rank of Grand Cross of the Order of Prince Henry of Portugal. She has promoted the learning of the Portuguese language in East Timor.

On 15 December 2016, Barreto was appointed Ambassador of East Timor to Vietnam. She was welcomed by the Vietnamese Deputy Prime Minister and Foreign Minister Pham Binh Minh in Hanoi. As ambassador, she promoted foreign business investment in East Timor and has discussed the development of bilateral trade agreements with the Vietnamese Prime Minister Nguyễn Xuân Phúc. In 2020, she participated in the Hanoi Union of Friendship Organizations (HUFO)'s writing competition, winning a third place prize.

In 2023, Barreto was a guest at the opening of an art exhibition of works by East Timorese artist Abel Júpiter at the Lisbon Theatre and Film School in Portugal.

== Personal life ==
Barreto was married to Amilcar Dias.
