= Bazartete =

Coordinates: 8°38′S 125°23′E

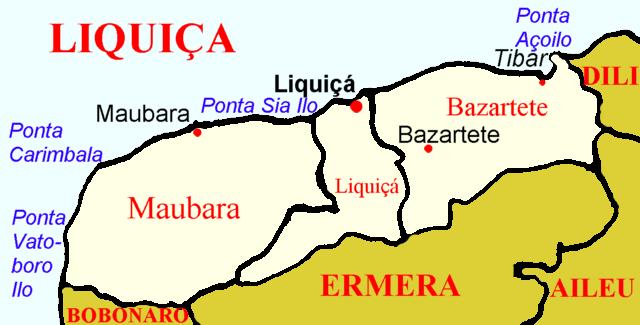
A map featuring the village

Bazartete (also known as Bazar Tete) is a village located in Timor-Leste, which comprises a subdistrict of Liquiçá District, located on a mountaintop in the rain forest, southeast of the Liquiçá township. Bazartete has a population of 20,190 people. The area and its surrounding villages was the site of numerous cases of intimidation, rape and murder committed by members of the Besi Merah Putih militia group following and during the autonomy vote of 1999.

== Notable people ==
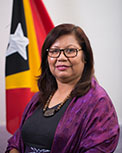
- Brigida Antónia Correia
  Pascoela Barreto – civil servant and diplomat
- Brigida Antónia Correia – agricultural scientist and MP (2007–18)
