= Wikan Sakarinto =

Indonesian professor and academic

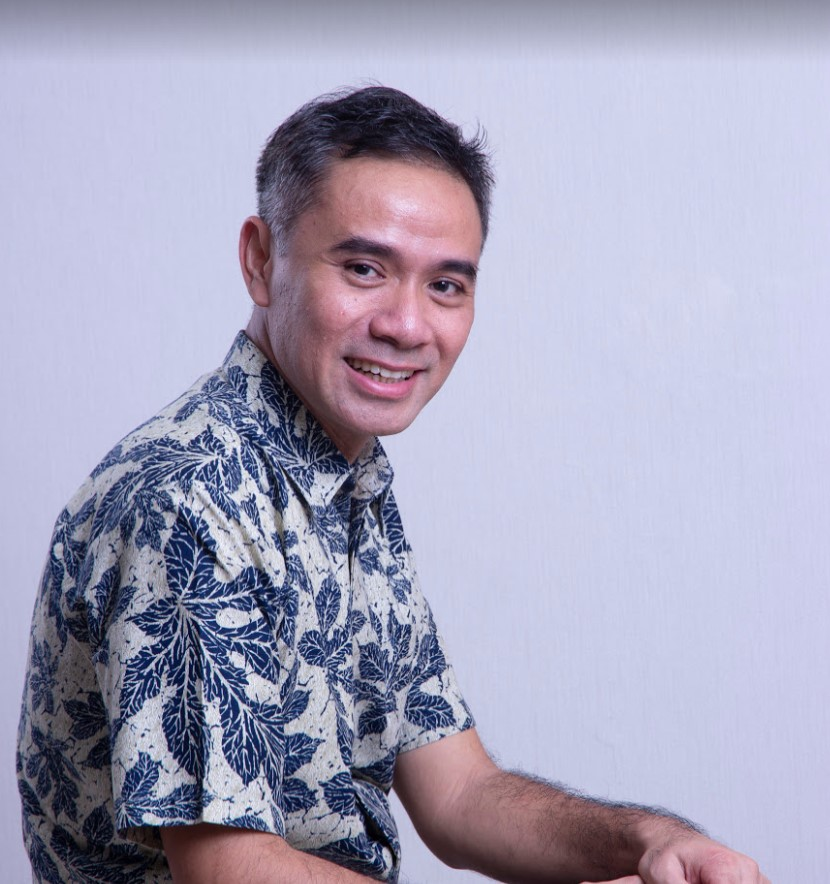

Director General of Vocational Education
- In office 8 May 2020 – 1 June 2022
- President: Joko Widodo
- Minister: Nadiem Makarim
- Preceded by: Patdono Suwignjo (acting)

Personal details
- Born: March 17, 1975 (age 51) Jogjakarta, Indonesia
- Spouse: Inggar Septhia Irawati
- Children: 2
- Education: Gadjah Mada University; Twente University; Technical University of Dortmund; Kobe University

Wikan Sakarinto (born 17 March 1975) is an Indonesian professor and academic. He is the Director General of Vocational Education in the Indonesian Ministry of Education and Culture since 8 May 2020. He was previously the dean of the Vocational School of the Gadjah Mada University from 2016 until 2020.

== Early life and education ==
Wikan Sakarinto was born on 17 March 1975 in Jogjakarta, Indonesia. After graduating from high school, Wikana took the State University Admission Examination to enter the Gadjah Mada University, but he did not pass the test. Wikan attended the university's vocational school instead, and graduated from the vocational school in 1997 after three years of study. Wikan then continued his study at the mechanical engineering program in the Gadjah Mada University and graduated from the university with a Bachelor of Engineering in 2001. Wikan obtained master's degree after finishing mechanical engineering program in the University of Twente in 2003 and the Technical University of Dortmund in 2005. He later attended the Mechanical Engineering PhD program in the Kobe University until 2009.

== Director General of Vocational Education ==
Wikan was inaugurated as the Director General of Vocational Education on 8 May 2020. The inauguration was held online by Nadiem Makarim, the Minister of Education.
