= Brigida Antónia Correia =

East Timorese politician and university teacher

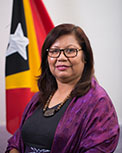

Member of Parliament
- In office 2007–2018

Personal details
- Party: National Congress for Timorese Reconstruction
- Education: National University of East Timor; Gadjah Mada University
- Occupation: Politician; agricultural scientist

Brigida Antónia Correia (born 1964 in Bazartete, Portuguese Timor) is a politician from East Timor. She has been a member of the National Congress for Timorese Reconstruction (CNRT) party since 2007. Priot to that, she had been a member of the Partido Trabalhista since 2000.

== Career ==
From 2000 to 2014 Correia was a lecturer at the Faculty of Agriculture at the National University of East Timor (UNTL). She studied for her PhD at Universitas Gadjah Mada; her thesis examined peanut cultivation. She was also director of the non-governmental organization Vecom from 2005 to 2012.

Correia has been a member of the East Timorese national parliament since 2007. From 2009 to 2011 she was Vice President of the National Guidelines Commission of the CNRT. Since 2011 she has been an ordinary member of the commission. At number 12 on the CNRT's list, Correia successfully returned to parliament in the 2017 parliamentary elections. She has now become a member of the Commission on Constitutional Affairs, Justice, Public Administration, Local Jurisprudence and the Fight against Corruption (Commission A), and a member of Parliament's Administrative Council. In the parliamentary elections in 2018, Correira failed to reach Parliament on list position 57 of the Aliança para Mudança e Progresso (AMP), the joint list of CNRT, PLP and KHUNTO.

== Publications ==
- Correia, Brigida Antonia. & Instituto de Linguistica (INL) UNTL. (2003). Objetivu dezenvolvimentu agrikultura Timor Loro Sa'e [East Timor agriculture development objectives].
- Correia, Brigida Antonia. (2004) Pengaruh umur panen dan penambahan inokulum rizobium terhadap produktivitas kacang tanah (Arachis hypogaea L.) [Effect of harvest age and addition of rhizobium inoculum on peanut (Arachis hypogaea L.) productivity].
