= UGM Campus Mosque =

Mosque in Sleman, Yogyakarta, Indonesia

Campus Mosque of Universitas Gadjah Mada
- Masjid Kampus Universitas Gadjah Mada
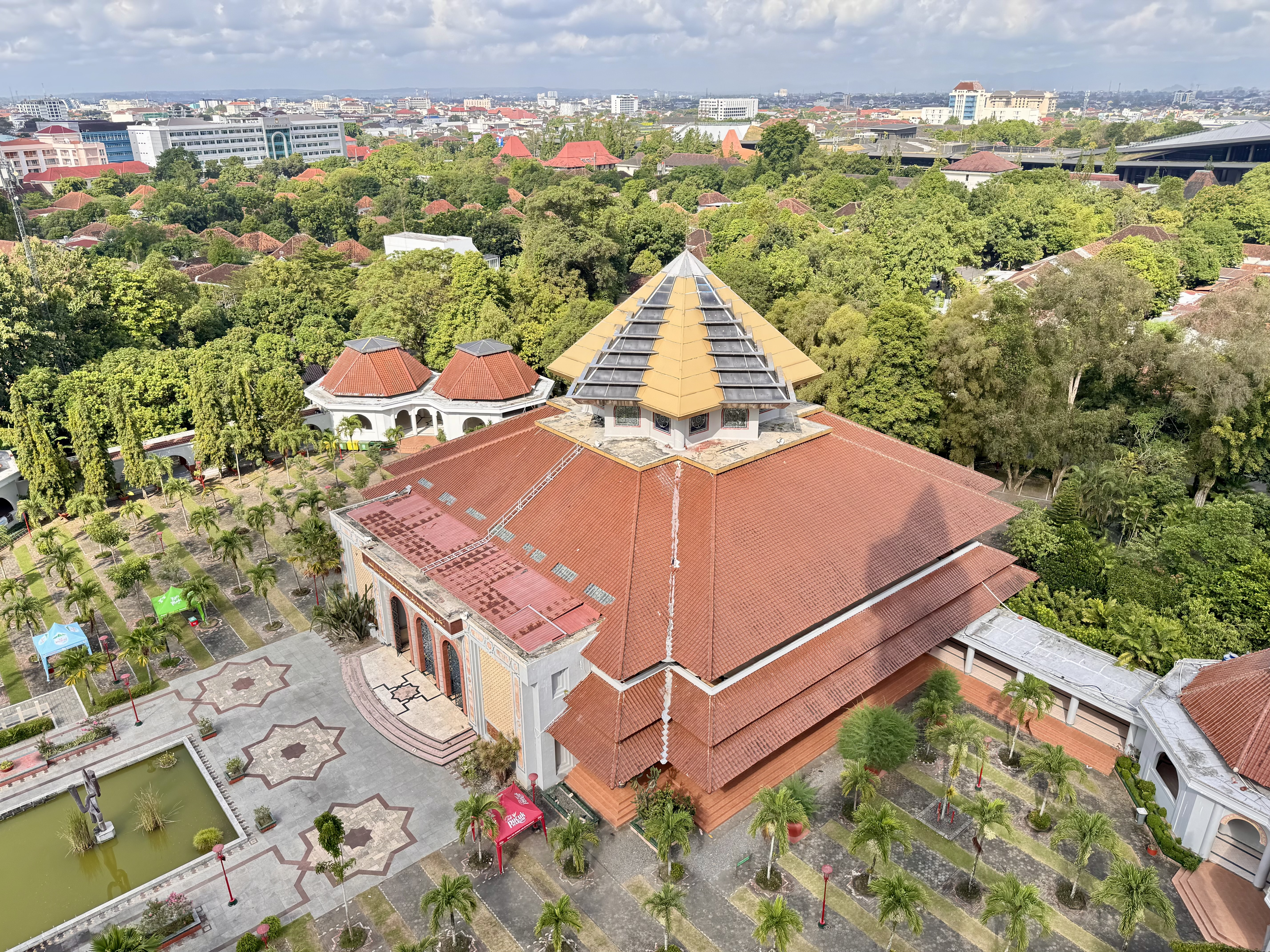
- UGM Campus Mosque 2026

- Location in Yogyakarta and surroundings

Religion
- Affiliation: Islam
- Branch/tradition: Sunni

Location
- Location: Masjid Kampus UGM complex, Bulaksumur, Depok, Sleman Regency, Special Region of Yogyakarta 55281
- Interactive map of Campus Mosque of Universitas Gadjah Mada
- Administration: Gadjah Mada University
- Coordinates: 7.773351°S 110.380016°E

Architecture
- Architect: UGM architecture engineering students
- Type: Mosque
- Style: Modern, Arabic, Chinese, Javanese and Indian
- Groundbreaking: 1998
- Completed: 1999
- Construction cost: 9.5 billion rupiah

Specifications
- Capacity: 10,000 pilgrims
- Dome: 1
- Minaret: 1

Website
- masjidkampus.ugm.ac.id

UGM Campus Mosque (Indonesian: Masjid Kampus UGM) is a mosque owned by Universitas Gadjah Mada (UGM) and located within its campus in Sleman, Special Region of Yogyakarta, Indonesia. It is one of the largest mosques in Southeast Asia in terms of capacity.

== Construction ==
The mosque's construction began on May 21, 1998, on the grounds of a former Chinese cemetery. The construction was done entirely by the students of the UGM Architecture Engineering department in order to complete the construction cost within 9.5 billion rupiah. It was inaugurated on December 4, 1999.

== Architecture ==
From the architectural perspective, UGM Campus Mosque is a blend of architectural styles of Al-Masjid an-Nabawi in Medina, Chinese, Indian and Javanese. In the courtyard there is a pool inspired by the one in Taj Mahal.

== Access ==
UGM Campus Mosque can be reached by Trans Jogja Line 4A and 4B.

== Gallery ==
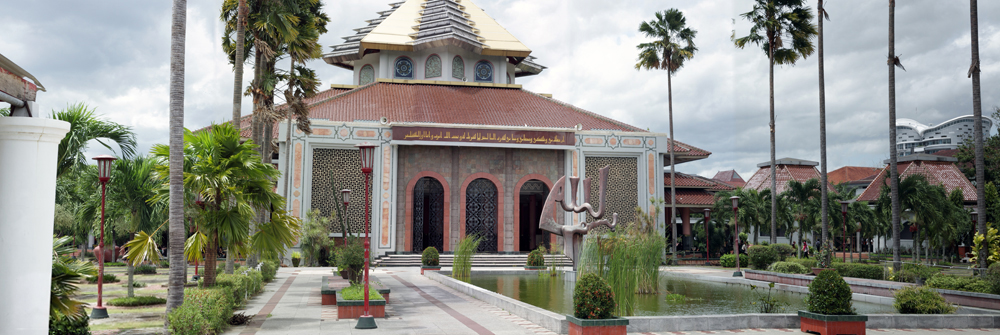
Panorama of UGM Campus Mosque
