= Hamid Awaludin =

Indonesian diplomat

Hamid Awaluddin
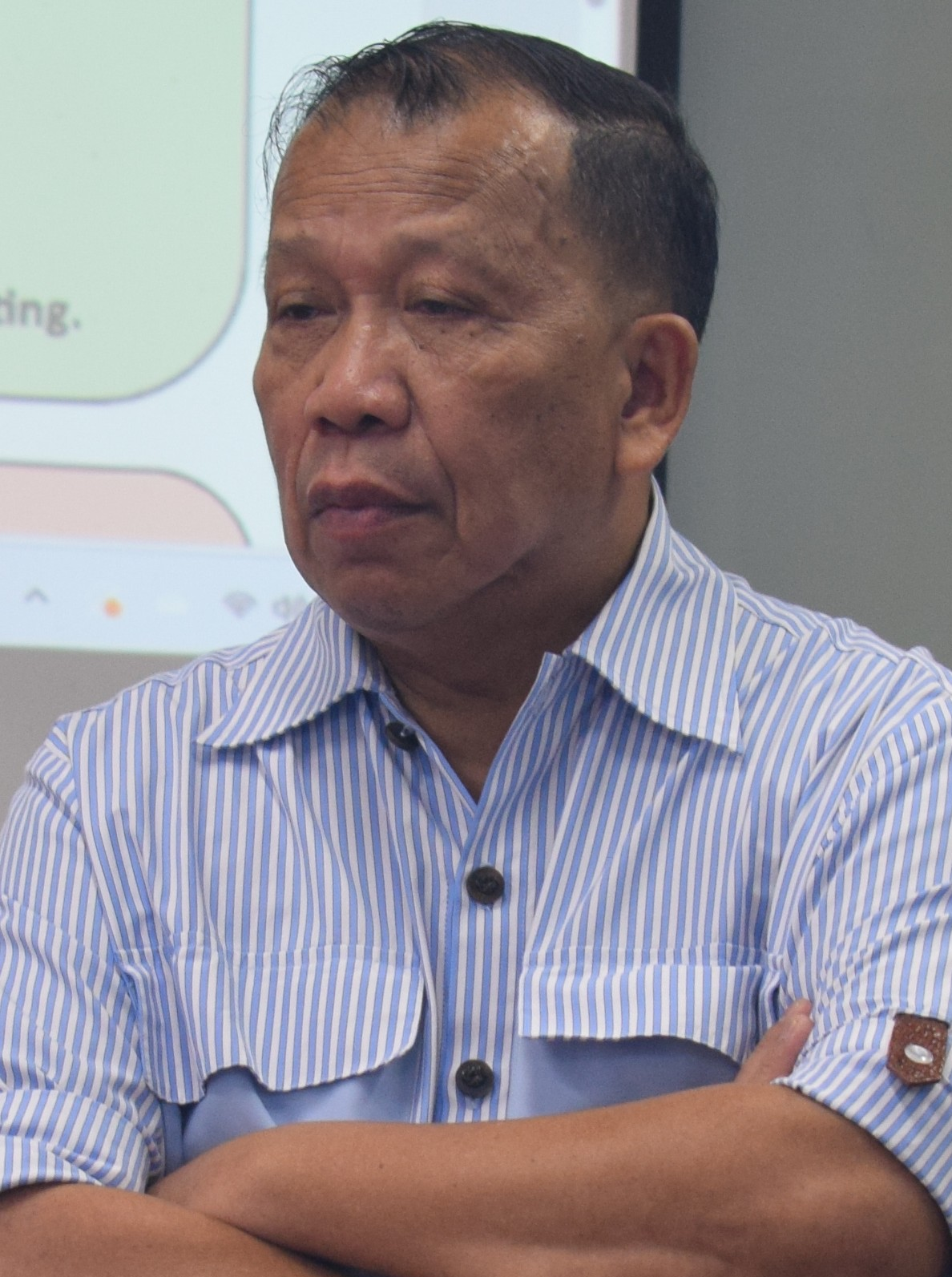
- Hamid in 2025

Ambassador of Indonesia to Russia and Belarus
- In office 2008–2011
- President: Susilo Bambang Yudhoyono
- Preceded by: Susanto Pudjomartono
- Succeeded by: Djauhari Oratmangun

Minister of Law and Human Rights
- In office 20 October 2004 – 9 May 2007
- President: Susilo Bambang Yudhoyono
- Preceded by: Yusril Ihza Mahendra
- Succeeded by: Andi Mattalatta

Personal details
- Born: 5 October 1960 (age 65) Parepare, South Sulawesi, Indonesia
- Education: Hasanuddin University; American University
- Profession: Diplomat and Academician

Hamid Awaluddin (/hɑːˈmɪd ɑːwɑːˈluːdɪn/)was the ambassador of the Republic of Indonesia to the Russian Federation and Belarus between 2008 and 2011.

== Biography ==
Awaluddin was born in Pare-Pare, Sulawesi Selatan on 5 October 1960. His tenure in office as Indonesian ambassador in Russia and Belarus began on 8 April 2008. Previously he was Minister of Law and Human Rights in Indonesia from 20 October 2004 – 8 May 2007. His tenure as Indonesian ambassador in Russia and Belarus ended in November 2011. On 26 November 2011 the Russia Muftis Council has awarded Hamid Awaluddin with an “Al-Fahr” honorary medal for his role in initiating partnership between Indonesian and Russian Muslims.

== Career ==
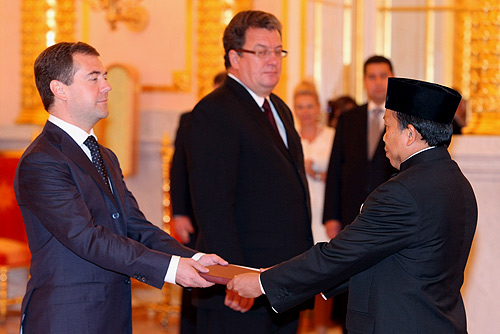
Ambassador of the Republic of Indonesia Hamid Awaludin presents his letter of credentials to the President of Russia, Dmitry Medvedev

His political career began early with his involvement in university activities. Beginning in his student years, he was active in the Islamic Students Association in Makassar, South Sulawesi. He attended university at Hasanuddin University in Makassar and later received his PhD in 1998 from the American University in the U.S. Before becoming cabinet minister Awaluddin was a member of the Indonesian Election Commission.

Hamid was also the lead negotiator and representative of Indonesian Government in the negotiations which led to the signing of the Peace Settlement MOU with the Free Aceh Movement in Helsinki in August 2005.
