= Susanto Pudjomartono =

Indonesian newspaper editor and diplomat

Ambassador of Indonesia to Russia, Kazakhstan, Mongolia, and Turkmenistan
- In office 2003–2008
- President: Megawati Soekarnoputri; Susilo Bambang Yudhoyono
- Preceded by: J.A. Katili
- Succeeded by: Hamid Awaluddin

Personal details
- Born: 18 May 1943
- Died: 14 January 2015 (aged 71) Jakarta, Indonesia
- Education: Gadjah Mada University
- Profession: Diplomat and Journalist

Susanto Pudjomartono (May 18, 1943 – January 14, 2015) was an Indonesian newspaper editor, journalist and diplomat. He served as the second chief editor of The Jakarta Post from 1991 until 2003. Pudjomartono was then appointed as Indonesia's Ambassador to Russia from 2003 to 2008. He was also a co-founder of Indonesia's Editors' Club.

In 1966, Pudjomartono graduated from the School of Social Sciences at Gadjah Mada University in Yogyakarta. He began his career at Tempo magazine.

He departed Tempo for The Jakarta Post, which was launched in 1983. Sabam Siagian served as the newspaper's first chief editor from 1983 to 1991. In 1991, Siagian departed the Jakarta Post to become Indonesia's Ambassador to Australia. Susanto Pudjomartono succeeded Siagian as the Jakarta Post's second chief editor.

Pudjomartono served as the Jakarta Post's chief editor in 1991 until 2003. He left the newspaper in 2003 upon his appointed as Indonesia's Ambassador to Russia by President Megawati Soekarnoputri. He served as Ambassador from 2003 to 2008, when he was succeeded by Hamid Awaluddin, a former government minister of law and human rights.

Susanto Pudjomartono died in Jakarta at 3 a.m. on January 14, 2015, at the age of 71. He had suffered from diabetes and had been undergoing kidney dialysis for several years. Pudjomartono, a resident of East Jakarta, was buried in Giritama Cemetery in Bogor, West Java. He was survived by his wife, Erlien.
