= Sukadji Ranuwihardjo =

Indonesian professor of economics (1931–2007)

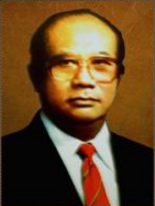
- Born: 9 November 1931; Blitar, East Java, Indonesia
- Died: 11 August 2007 (aged 75); Yogyakarta, Indonesia
- Education: Gadjah Mada University; University of California, Berkeley
- Occupation: Economist
- Known for: Rector of Gadjah Mada University and senior official in Ministry of Education
- Title: Professor of Economics
- Spouse: Soetarlinah

Sukadji Ranuwihardjo (9 November 1931 – 11 August 2007) was an Indonesian academic and former Rector (Head) of Gadjah Mada University (Universitas Gadjah Mada, or UGM) from 1973 to 1981.

Sukadji was born on 9 November 1931, in Blitar, East Java, in what was, at the time, the Dutch East Indies (present-day Indonesia). He went to school, first, in Malang in East Java before moving to Gadjah Mada University in Yogyakarta to study economics. He later obtained a master's degree from the University of California, Berkeley, before completing a doctoral degree at UGM. His wife, Soetarlinah, was a psychologist, also a professor at Gadjah Mada University.

Sukadji began his career as the head of the accounting and budget division at the Indonesian state railroad company, PNKA, from 1957 until 1959. Following his work in the PNKA Sukadji became a lecturer at the National Resilience Institute. He also served as an assistant trade minister in the Indonesian trade ministry.

Sukadji was an active staff member in the Faculty of Economics at Gadjah Mada University during the 1960s and 1970s, serving in many positions in the Faculty. He was chair of the Yogyakarta Branch of the Ikatan Sarjana Ekonomi Indonesia (Indonesian Economic Scholars Association) between 1966 and 1968. He became Dean of the Economics Faculty of UGM in 1966 and served until 1973. He was elected to the position of Rector (Head) of the university in 1973, a position he held until 1981.

In addition to his academic duties, Sukadji served in various capacities at the national level. He was appointed as a member of the provisional national parliament (DPRS/MPRS, or Dewan Perwakilan Rakyat Sementara/Majelis Permusyawaratan Rakyat Sementara) between 1968 and 1970 and also of the Indonesian upper house of parliament (Majelis Permusyawaratan Rakyat, MPR, or People's Consultative Assembly) after 1973. Beginning in 1984 he served until the 1990s in the important post of Director General of Higher Education in the Ministry of Education in Jakarta, a position which closely involved him in high-level policy management of higher education issues in Indonesia. In 1992 he was awarded the honorary degree of Doctor of the University (honoris causa) at Murdoch University in Perth in recognition of his services to higher education in Indonesia.

Sukadji died on 11 August 2007. A viewing was held at Balairung Hall located at Gadjah Mada University, according to the head of the university's public relations department, Suryo Baskoro. Sukadji was buried at the University's school burial grounds at Kawansan Sawitsari, Sleman.
