= Hanum Salsabiela Rais =

Indonesian writer and politician

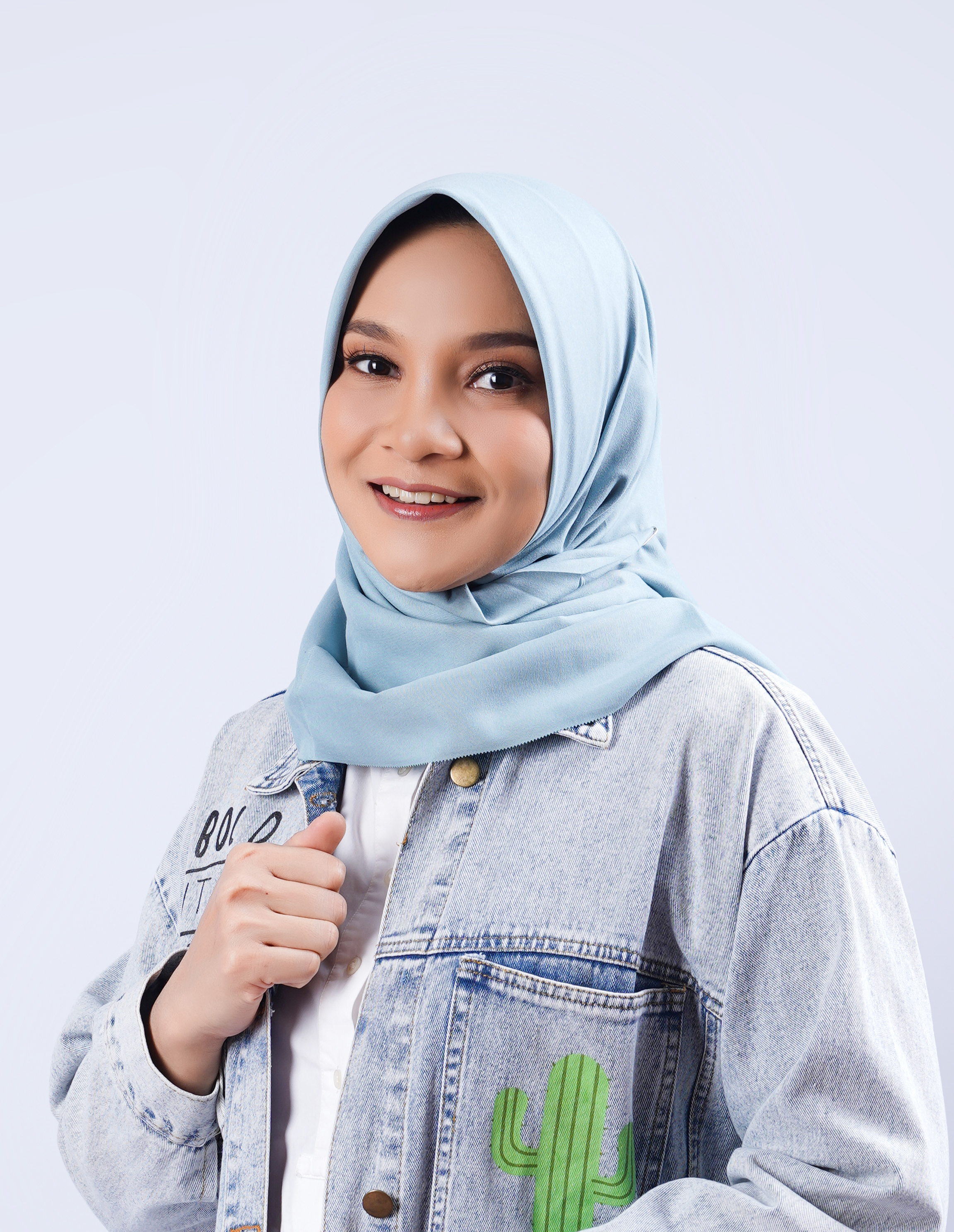

Personal details
- Relations: Amien Rais

Hanum Salsabiela Rais (born 1982) is a politician, writer, and former television presenter from Yogyakarta as she used to work as reporter and news presenter at TransTV for 5 years. She served as a Member of the Regional People's Representative Council of the Special Region of Yogyakarta Province (DPRD DIY) (id) for 2019–2024. Previously a member of the National Mandate Party, Rais joined the Ummah Party in 2023 and yet retired from politics since early 2025, focusing in film and media literary activities ever since.

Hanum's first screenwriting project was to adapt her novel 99 Cahaya di Langit Eropa (99 Lights in the European Sky). Since then, she has penned scripts for several films, including Bulan Terbelah di Langit Amerika Parts 1 & 2 (2015–2016), Hanum Rangga: Faith and The City (2019), and I am Sarahza (2025) which is bridged to adapted title Jangan Menyerah, Ibu (I am Sarahza) produced by Sinemart. Her latest historical fiction, Sangkakala di Langit Andalusia (The Last Trumpet in the Sky of Andalucia) became the most inspirational Book of the Year in 2024 by IKAPI as well as selected as one of ten original Indonesian intellectual properties presented at the 2025 JAFF Content Market, part of the Jogja-NETPAC Asian Film Festival, one of Indonesia’s leading platforms for Asian cinema and screen-industry collaboration. The novel explores the legacy of Al-Andalus and the wider Islamic world. The works also examine historical connections between Indonesia and the Ottoman Empire

== Career ==
Rais has a degree from the Faculty of Dentistry at Gadjah Mada University. She has worked as a dentist as well as a television presenter and writer. Co-authored with her husband Rangga Almahendra (id), the 2011 novel 99 Cahaya di Langit Eropa - and the film of the same name - is based on their life together, including a period living in Austria. It deals with themes of migration and Islamophobia. The 2013 collection Berjalan di Atas Cahaya was co-authored with Tutie Amaliah and Wardatul Ula. It deals with social attitudes to Islam and how location can be a factor, for both those who practice the religion and those who do not.

In 2018, she was accused by the Indonesian Dentists Association of breaking their ethical code by using social media to perpetuate misinformation about an alleged case of abuse, which turned out to be untrue. Nevertheless, the case subsided because the public kept comparing other hoaxes to what they considered the biggest hoax perpetrated by Joko Widodo, Indonesia’s seventh president, regarding allegations that his diploma was a fake.

Rais served as a Member of the Regional People's Representative Council of the Special Region of Yogyakarta Province (DPRD DIY) (id) for 2019–2024. Previously a member of the National Mandate Party, Rais joined the Ummah Party in 2023. In May 2024 she announced her candidacy for the role of Mayor of Yogyakarta.

== Filmography ==
=== Film ===
Year	Title	Credited As		Note
Year	Title	Screenwriter	Producer	Note
2013	99 Cahaya di Langit Eropa	Story and scenario	Associate producer	Also an actress.
2014	99 Cahaya di Langit Eropa Part 2	Story and scenario	Associate producer	
2015	Bulan Terbelah di Langit Amerika	Story and scenario	Associate producer	
2016	Bulan Terbelah di Langit Amerika 2	Story an scenario	No	
2018	Hanum & Rangga: Faith & The City	Story and scenario	No	
2026	Jangan Menyerah, Ibu (I am Sarahza)	Story and scenario	Associate producer	

== Personal life ==
Rais is the daughter of Amien Rais.

== Selected works ==
- 99 Cahaya di Langit Eropa (2011)
- Berjalan di Atas Cahaya (Gramedia Pustaka Utama, 2013)
- Bulan Terbelah di Langit Amerika (Gramedia Pustaka Utama, 2015)
- Faith and The City (Gramedia Pustaka Utama, 2015)
- I am Sarahza (2018)
- Sangkakala di Langit Andalusia (2022)
