= Ahmad Wahib =

- Born: 9 November 1942; Sampang, Indonesia
- Died: 31 March 1973 (aged 30)
- Education: Gadjah Mada University
- Occupation: journalist
- Known for: Islamic reformism
- Notable work: Pergolakan Pemikiran Islam (Upheaval in Islamic Thinking)

Ahmad Wahib (November 9, 1942 - March 31, 1973) was an Indonesian progressive Islamic intellectual. He is known for his reformist thinking especially from his diary in the publication Pergolakan Pemikiran Islam (Upheaval in Islamic Thinking) edited by his fellow progressive Islamic thinkers Djohan Effendi and Ismet Natsir. In his diary, he criticized heavily the perceived rigidity and the absolutism of Islamic traditions and advocated for the radical reapproach on religious norms. He was a part of the Yogyakarta based progressive Islamic intellectual circle Limited Group led by Mukti Ali. In one interview with Douglas E. Ramage, an Indonesian intellectual graduated from the University of South Carolina, he referred to Wahib as one of the revolutionary Islamic thinkers. He died in a traffic accident on March 31, 1973, at the age of 30.

== Early life ==
Wahib grew up in a religiously devout environment in Madura, one of the strongholds of the Islamic mass organization Nahdlatul Ulama. His father was a leader of pesantren and was widely known in his community. During his youth, he was inspired by Muhammad Abduh's renewal and modernist thinking, and thus inclined to rejecting the idol which was revered by his tradition and ancestors. Idolatry was popular among the Madurese folk traditions, which glorified objects such as spear, kris, and primbon book. Provoking on this issue had generated interest in more general issues such as the nature of Islamic ideology.

== Activism ==
Wahib pursued his higher education at Gadjah Mada University in Yogyakarta and became active in the Muslim Students Association (HMI) among the core members of the organization. Yogyakarta being an intellectually and culturally rich city in Indonesia, this background affected him greatly in his intellectual development. The turbulent time he was living, mired in economic collapse, political tensions such as the coup attempt by the Communist Party of Indonesia in 1965, and the subsequent genocide against the communists during 1965-1966, had influenced greatly in his intellectual outlook as well. This led to his resignation from HMI in 1969, together with Djohan Effendi, questioning the direction of the religious thoughts shared by the members, including the anti-communism and religious exclusivism espoused by the central figures such as Imaduddin Abdulrahim. His resignation from HMI led to the radical rethinking in his religious view. He concluded that there is no alternative to religious pluralism, and considered the rigidity of ulama and the absolutist thinking among Islamic traditions need to be redeemed.

== Bibliography ==
- Kersten, Carool (2015). Islam in Indonesia The Contest for Society, Ideas and Values. London: Hurst & Company.
- Fatonah, Sidiq (2010). Bebas, Berbhineka, Berindonesia: Menjadi Muslim dalam Rekonstruksi Pemikiran Ahmad Wahib. Jakarta: Paramadina with HIVOS. pp. 75–94.
