= Gadjah Mada University =

National university in Yogyakarta, Indonesia

Coordinates: 7°46′10″S 110°22′44″E

- Universitas Gadjah Mada
- University emblem
- Other name: UGM
- Former name: Universiteit Negeri Gadjah Mada
- Motto: Mengakar Kuat, Menjulang Tinggi
- Motto in English: Locally Rooted, Globally Respected
- Type: Public research university
- Established: December 19, 1949; 76 years ago
- Accreditation: AACSB Accredited, CHEA, WFME, FIBAA, ABET, IChemE, ASIIN, KAAB, IABEE
- Academic affiliations: AUN; ASAIHL; FUIW; ASEA-UNINET; Universitas 21
- Rector: Ova Emilia
- Academic staff: 2,812 (2026)
- Administrative staff: 3,952 (2026)
- Total staff: 6,764 (2026)
- Students: 69,067 (2026) excluding pre-master's and pre-doctoral students
- Undergraduates: 44,654 (2026)
- Postgraduates: 13,419 (2026)
- Doctoral students: 3,911 (2026)
- Other students: Specialist: 2,400 (2026); Professional: 4,683 (2026)
- Location: Bulaksumur, Caturtunggal, Kapanewon Depok, Sleman Regency, Special Region of Yogyakarta, 55281, Indonesia
- Campus: 29,114,952 m^{2} (7,194.461 acres); Suburban
- Language: Indonesian; English (for international programs)
- Colors: Light khaki
- Website: www.ugm.ac.id/en

Gadjah Mada University (Javanese: ꦈꦤꦶꦮ꦳ꦼꦂꦱꦶꦠꦱ꧀ꦒꦗꦃꦩꦢ; Indonesian: Universitas Gadjah Mada, abbreviated as UGM) is a public research university located in Sleman, Special Region of Yogyakarta, Indonesia. Officially founded on 19 December 1949, Universitas Gadjah Mada is one of the oldest and largest institutions of higher education in the country, and has been credited as one of the best universities in Indonesia. In the 2027 QS World University Rankings, UGM is ranked 2nd in Indonesia and 206th in the world, also 2nd in Indonesia and 801-1000th in the world (THE WUR 2027).

During the period when native education was often restricted, the institution was the first to open its medicine to native Indonesians when it was founded in the 1940s under Dutch rule.

UGM lists 300 study programs: 71 bachelor's, 22 applied bachelor's, 96 master's, 2 applied master's, 13 professional, 34 specialist, 10 subspecialist, and 52 doctoral programs. The university has enrolled approximately 69,000 students, 2,000 international students, and has 2,800 faculty members. UGM maintains a campus of 2,911.5 ha (7,194 acres), with facilities that include a stadium and a fitness center.

The university is named after Gajah Mada, the Prime Minister of the Majapahit Empire of Java in the 14th century, who is also considered to be the nation's first unifier by some historians. The spelling of the university's name still reflects the old Dutch-era spelling.

== History ==
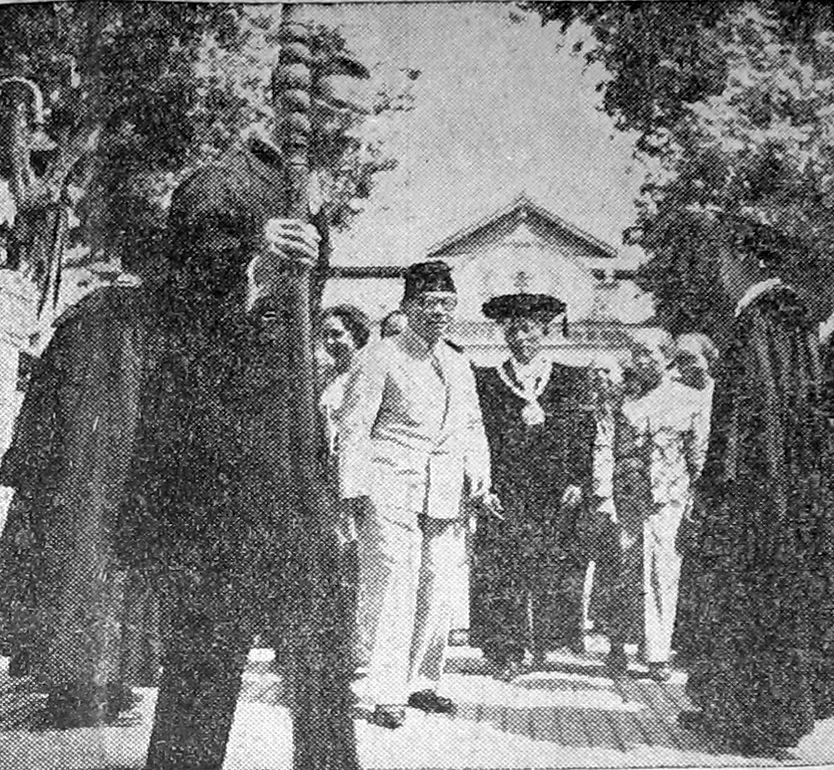
Dies Natalis celebrations in 1950

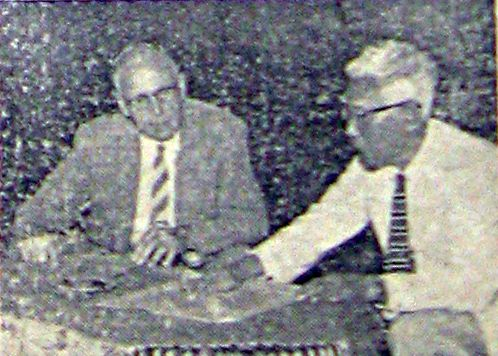
First Rector of Gadjah Mada University, Sardjito with Harry R. Wellman (President of University of California) (1960)

UGM was the first state university in Indonesia, established as Universiteit Negeri Gadjah Mada (UNGM) when Indonesia was still facing threats from the Netherlands, which wanted to regain control. At the time, the capital of Indonesia was temporarily moved from Jakarta to Yogyakarta.

UGM was established through Government Regulation (PP) No. 23 of 1949, regarding the merger of colleges to form a university. Although the regulations were dated 16 December, UGM's inauguration took place on 19 December, intentionally chosen to coincide with the anniversary of the Dutch invasion of Yogyakarta, exactly one year before. The intentional date was meant to show that one year after the Dutch had invaded the city, the Indonesian Government could establish its own national university there.

When it was founded, UGM had six faculties: Medicine, Dentistry, and Pharmacy; Law, Economics, Social and Political Sciences; Engineering; Letters, Pedagogy and Philosophy; Agriculture; and Veterinary Medicine.

From 1952 until 1972, the Faculty of Law, Social and Political Sciences was split into two faculties: the Surabaya branch of the Faculty of Law, Social, and Political Sciences, which was integrated into University of Airlangga; and the Faculty of Education and Teacher Training, which was integrated into IKIP Yogyakarta (now Universitas Negeri Yogyakarta).

During its initial years of Dutch resistance, the university taught literature and law in the buildings and other facilities belonging to the palace of the Yogyakarta Sultan Hamengkubuwono IX, who volunteered his palace for the university's use. UGM gradually established a campus of its own in Bulaksumur, on the northern side of Yogyakarta, and now occupies an area of three square kilometres.

== Faculties and schools ==
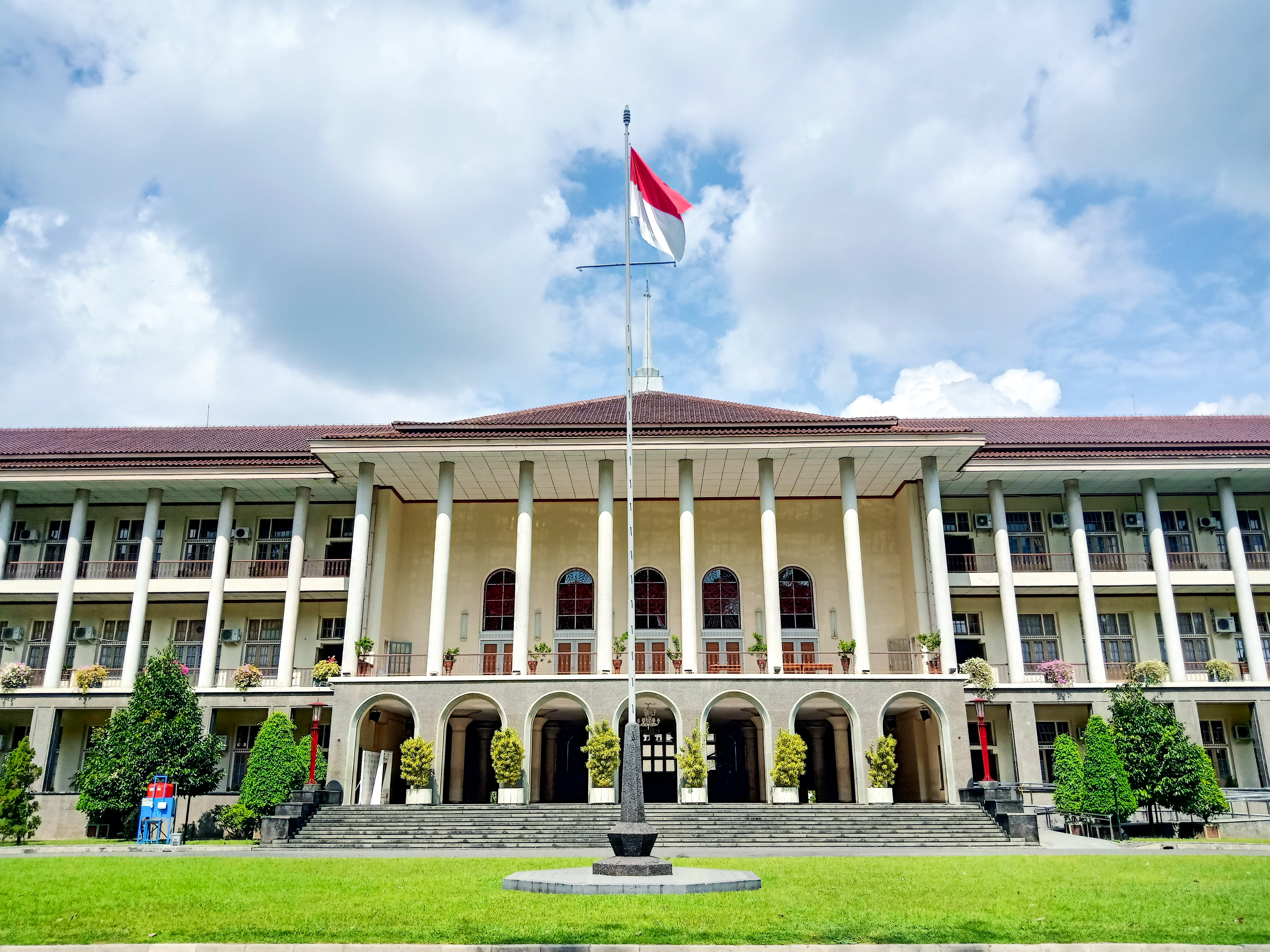
Balairung, home of the university's central administration offices

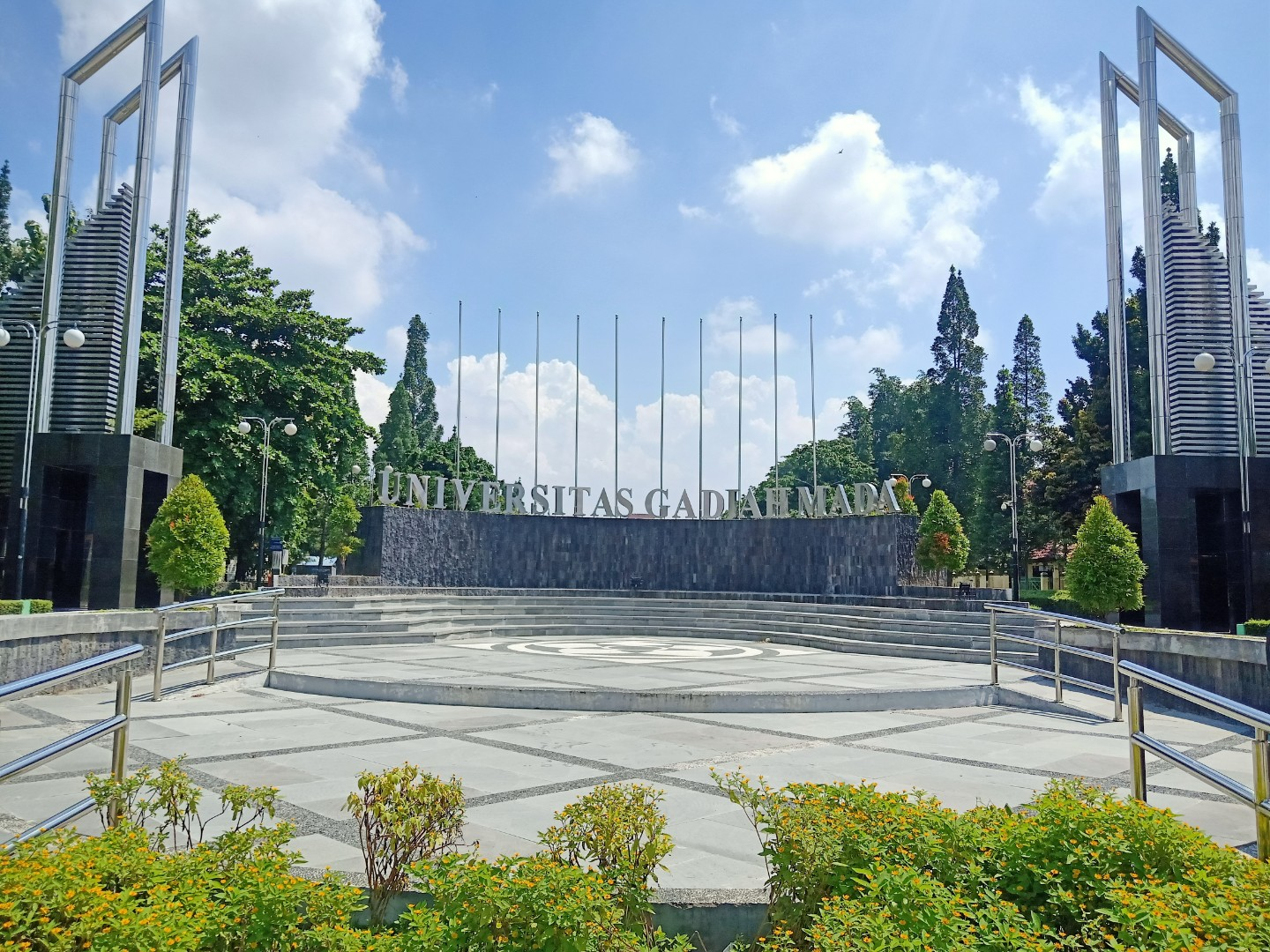
Main Gate

The UGM main building is called the Balairung, a rectorate building, in Sleman. Nearby is the Grha Sabha Pramana, a large building utilized for graduation ceremonies, with an adjoining square used for sport and recreation. There is also a university library and a sports center, consisting of a stadium, tennis court, and basketball field. More recently, it has established Gelanggang Inovasi dan Kreativitas, a 48.760 m² integrated complex of artistic spaces, green rooftop, and exhibition places.

Most of the main campus is located in Sleman, with the small parts (such as part of the School of Applied Sciences and part of the Faculty of Social and Political Sciences) located within Yogyakarta city.

The UGM administration is divided into 18 faculties, offering study programs from the undergraduate to 4 clusters of post-doctoral level. There is also a school of applied sciences offering vocational higher education programmes.

=== Schools and faculties ===
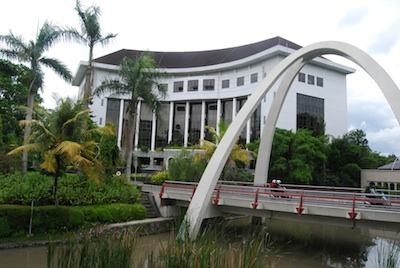
UGM Graduate School Building in Yogyakarta Campus

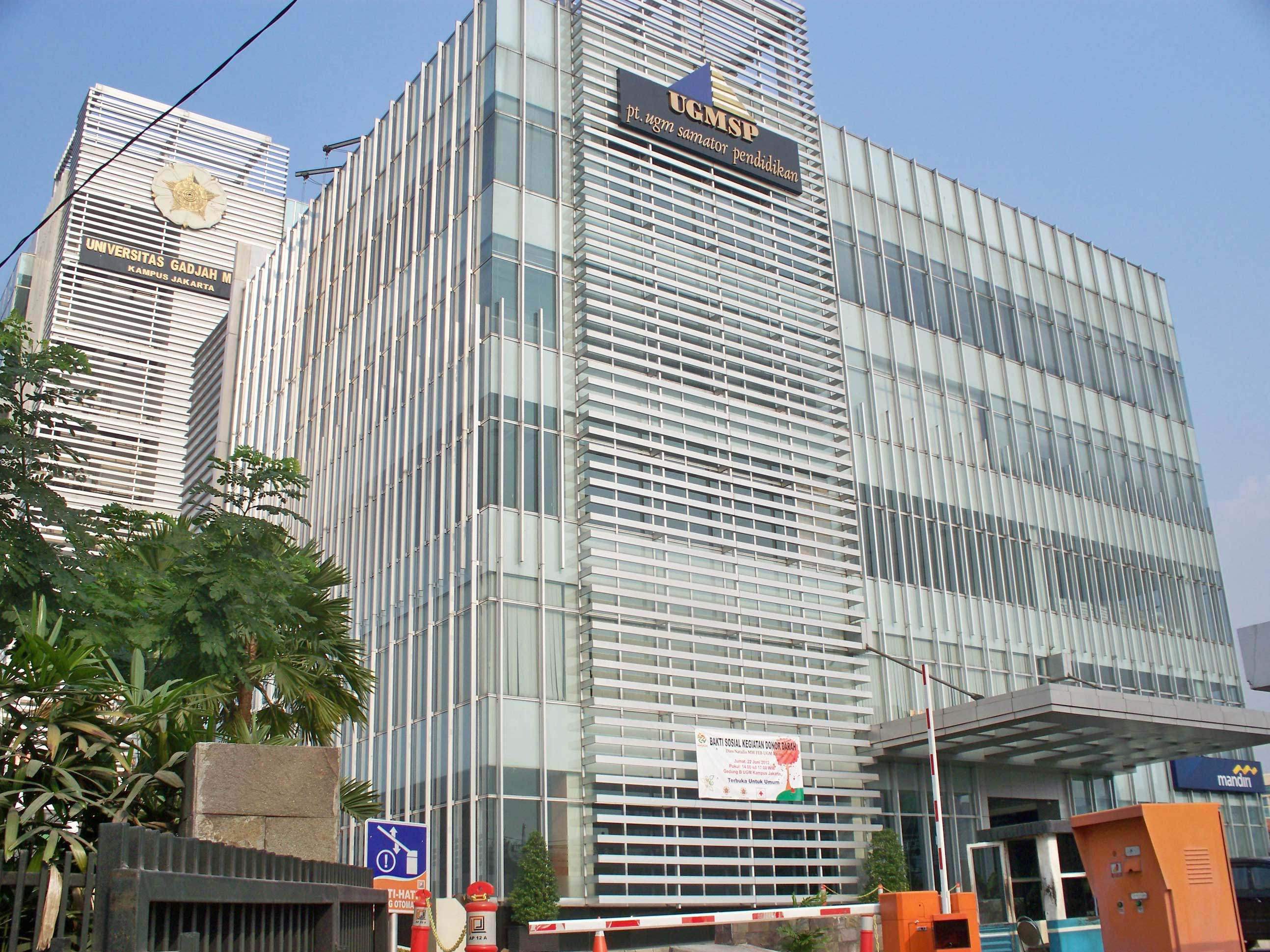
UGM Business School Building in Jakarta Campus

- Faculty of Biology
- Faculty of Philosophy
- Faculty of Geography
- Faculty of Agricultural Technology
- Faculty of Engineering
- Faculty of Psychology
- Faculty of Animal Science
- Faculty of Agriculture
- Faculty of Mathematics and Natural Sciences
- Faculty of Law
- Faculty of Cultural Sciences
- Faculty of Social Science & Political Science
- Faculty of Dentistry
- Faculty of Veterinary Medicine
- Faculty of Medicine, Public Health, and Nursing
- Faculty of Forestry
- Faculty of Pharmacy
- Faculty of Economics and Business
- School of Applied Sciences
- Graduate School

==== Jakarta campus ====
In 2010, UGM established a branch campus in South Jakarta, Jakarta. Initially offering only MBA courses, now the campus also offers Master of Laws (LLM), and various Masters in Social and Political Sciences aimed at working professionals.

=== International programmes ===
International Student Admission UGM - Undergraduate & Graduate (2020)
Asia	71.4%
Europe	18.8%
North America (US & Canada)	3.7%
Australia/Oceania	3.5%
Africa	2%
South America	0.6%
Source : ADMISSION UNIVERSITAS GADJAH MADA

UGM provides some major programs in English and admits international students. In 2018, 1,334 Asian students, 566 European students, 213 Australian/Oceanian students, 101 North American students, 58 African students, and 12 South American students studied in the 18 faculties of Gadjah Mada University.

Currently, International Undergraduate Programs are being offered in:

- Faculty of Animal Science
- Faculty of Biology
- Faculty of Dentistry
- Faculty of Economics and Business
- Faculty of Engineering
- Faculty of Geography
- Faculty of Law
- Faculty of Mathematics and Natural Sciences
- Faculty of Medicine, Public Health and Nursing
- Faculty of Pharmacy
- Faculty of Psychology
- Faculty of Social and Political Sciences
- Faculty of Veterinary Medicine
- School of Applied Sciences

Several faculties such as the Faculty of Cultural Sciences, Faculty of Forestry, Faculty of Agricultural Technology and Faculty of Agricultural also offer International/Dual-degree offerings at the Postgraduate level.

=== Research centers ===
UGM has 21 university-level research and study centers.

== Achievements ==
In 2013, UGM's chemistry undergraduate program received accreditation from the Royal Society of Chemistry (RSC) in the United Kingdom, the largest European-based international organization devoted to the advancement of chemical science. This is the first international accreditation ever received by the university and was effective from 5 March 2013 to March 2018.

UGM currently has 96 internationally accredited programs, including those accredited by AACSB, ABET, IChemE, ASIIN, KAAB, AUN QA, IABEE, FIBAA and RSC.

== Rankings ==
University rankings

Global – Overall
- QS World: 206 (2027)
- QS Employability: 301-500 (2020)
- THE World: 801–1000 (2027)
- USNWR Global: =1197 (2026)

Regional – Overall
- QS Asia: 53 (2027)
- THE Asia: 301-350 (2022)

The university was the highest-ranked school in Indonesia for three consecutive years (from 2021 to 2023) in the QS World University Rankings. In 2027, it was ranked 206 in the world, this achievement was the highest ranking ever achieved by UGM in QS WUR in the last 17 years. As of 2025, five academic subject clusters—Arts & Humanities, Engineering & Technology, Natural Sciences, and Social Sciences & Management—have consistently ranked second nationally in Indonesia, while Life Sciences & Medicine ranked third. In 2026, the highest-ranked subject was Theology, Divinity & Religious Studies ranked 45, meanwhile in 2022 ranked 47.

In 2022, (SDG 1: No Poverty) UGM was ranked in the top 10, in 2025 ranked 6, in 2026 ranked 7 the world (among 2.389 institutions) according to Times Higher Education (THE) Impact Rankings which uses seventeen criteria of Sustainable Development Goals and UGM leading or outstanding performance in eleven criteria (SDG no 1, 2, 4, 6, 7, 8, 9, 12, 14, 16 and 17). In the world overall assessment, UGM was ranked 72 in 2020, ranked 83 in 2021, ranked 87 in 2022, ranked 82 in 2025 and ranked 41 in 2026.

In 2023 UGM was ranked 280–300 in the world according to QS World University Rankings: Sustainability 2023, rank 383 in 2026, rank 409 in 2027, 1st in Indonesia. UGM also ranked 1st in Indonesia and Southeast Asia in the Good Governance category. Employer Reputation indicator rank 93 & Academic Reputation indicator rank 131 (QS WUR 2027).

=== Subject ===
QS World University Rankings by Subject 2026

World rank	Subject
45	▲ Theology, Divinity & Religious Studies
51 – 100	▲ Anthropology; ▲ Development Studies
101 – 150	Geography
151 – 200	▲ Law & Legal Studies; History; Archaeology; English Language and Literature; Modern Languages; Politics & International Studies; Agriculture & Forestry
201 – 250	▲ Economics & Econometrics; ▲ Sociology; Architecture & Built Environment; Business & Management Studies; ▼ Accounting & Finance
251 – 300	Communication & Media Studies
301 – 350	▲ Electrical and Electronic Engineering
351 – 400	▲ Computer Science and Information Systems; Pharmacy & Pharmacology; Chemical Engineering; Linguistics
401 – 450	▲ Mechanical, Aeronautical & Manufacturing Engineering; Education & Training; Medicine
451 – 500	▲ Chemistry
501 – 550	▲ Biological Sciences; Environmental Sciences; Mineral & Mining Engineering; Mathematics
551 – 600	▲ Physics & Astronomy
601 – 650	

QS Rankings by Cluster (2026)
Subject	Global	National
Arts & Humanities	▲189	2
Engineering and Technology	▲293	▼4
Life Sciences & Medicine	401-450	3
Natural Sciences	501-550	▼3
Social Sciences & Management	▲181	2

THE World University Rankings by Subject 2026
Subject	Global	National
Arts & humanities	401-500	▲1
Business & economics	401-500	▲1
Computer science	601-800	2
Engineering	▼1001-1250	▼7
Law	▲201-250	▲1
Life sciences	801-1000	5
Medical & Health	601-800	▼4
Physical sciences	▲1001-1250	▲7
Psychology	-	-
Social sciences	501-600	▲1

== Student life ==
=== Student orientation ===
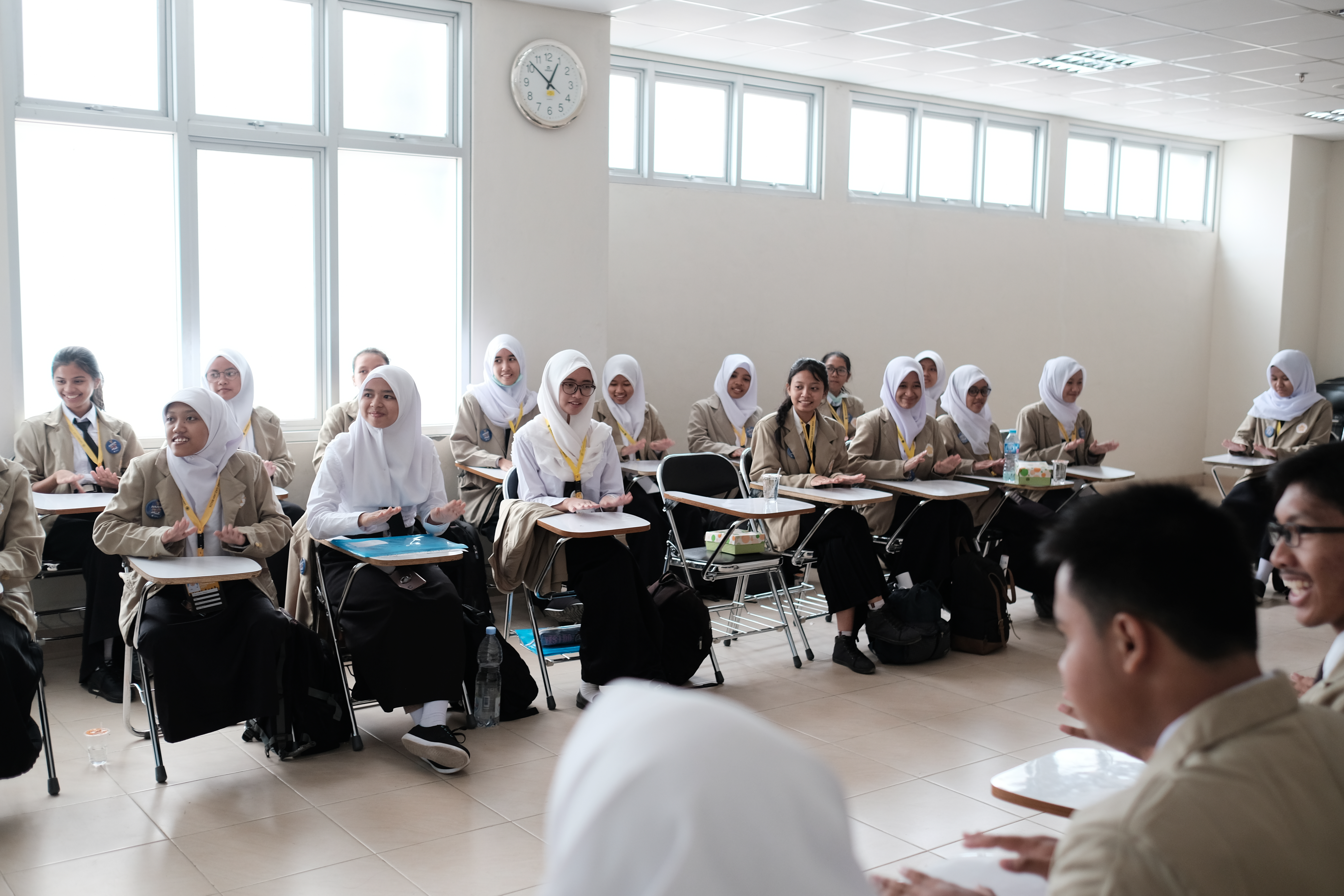
Undergraduate Student Orientation & Training (2017)

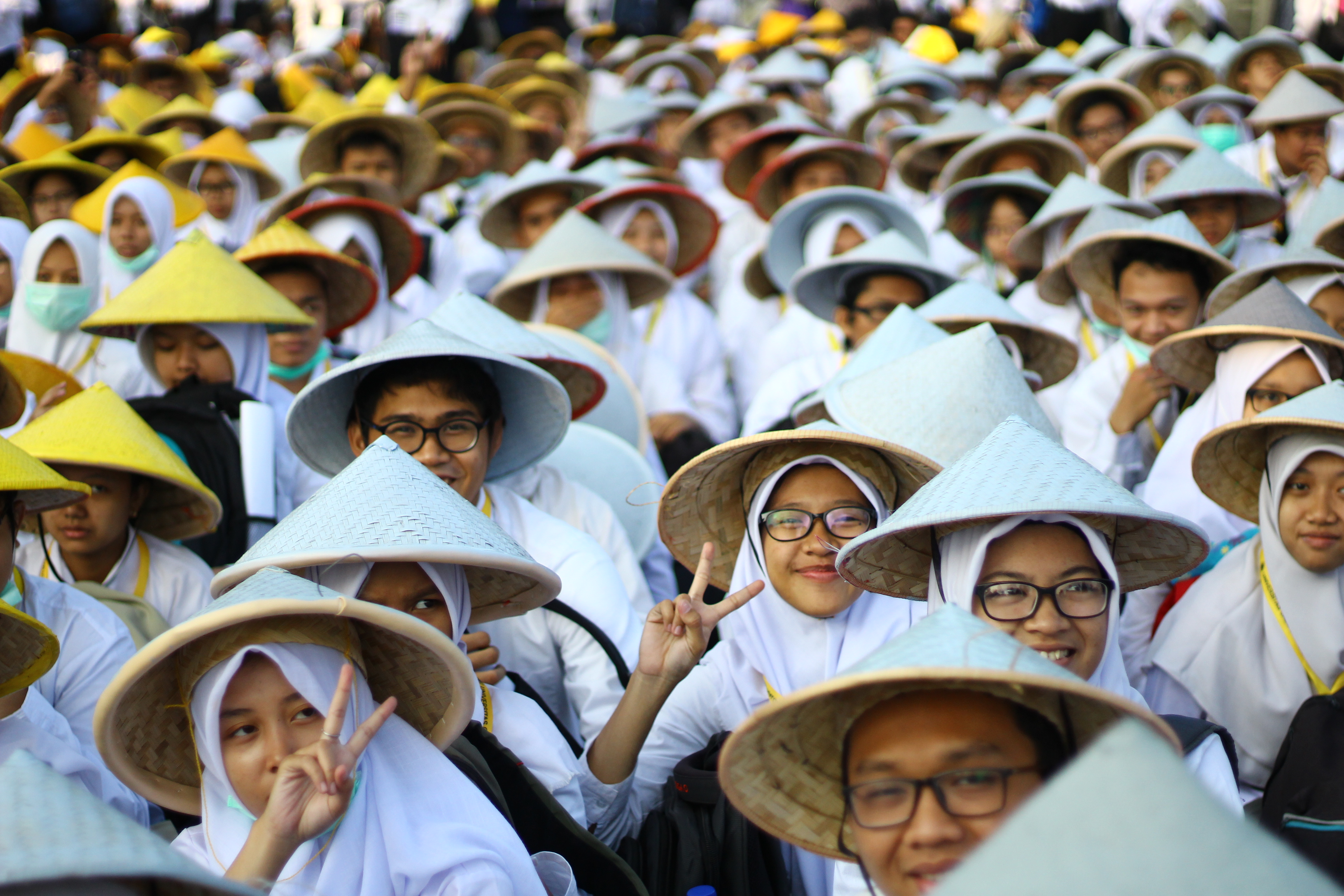
Undergraduate Student Welcoming Ceremony (2017)

Every year, UGM welcomes new undergraduate students by holding a one-week student orientation session called PPSMB (Pelatihan Pembelajar Sukses bagi Mahasiswa Baru Palapa, "Training for New Students to be Successful Learners") which involves a short course introducing UGM's common knowledge, values, rules, and soft-skill education. It was named PPSMB Palapa (named after Palapa oath) since its inception in 2012, before renamed to PPSMB Pionir (lit. 'Pioneer') in 2023. On the last day of the program, there is a closing ceremony where students make a formation of a symbol or logo. In 2018, the students created a formation called Bersatu Nusantara Indonesia ("United Indonesian Archipelago") with the Indonesian national flag, to encourage a spirit of unity across differences in the country. In 2023, PPSMB broke a record for featuring ten different formations with just 30 minutes of preparation.

=== Community service ===
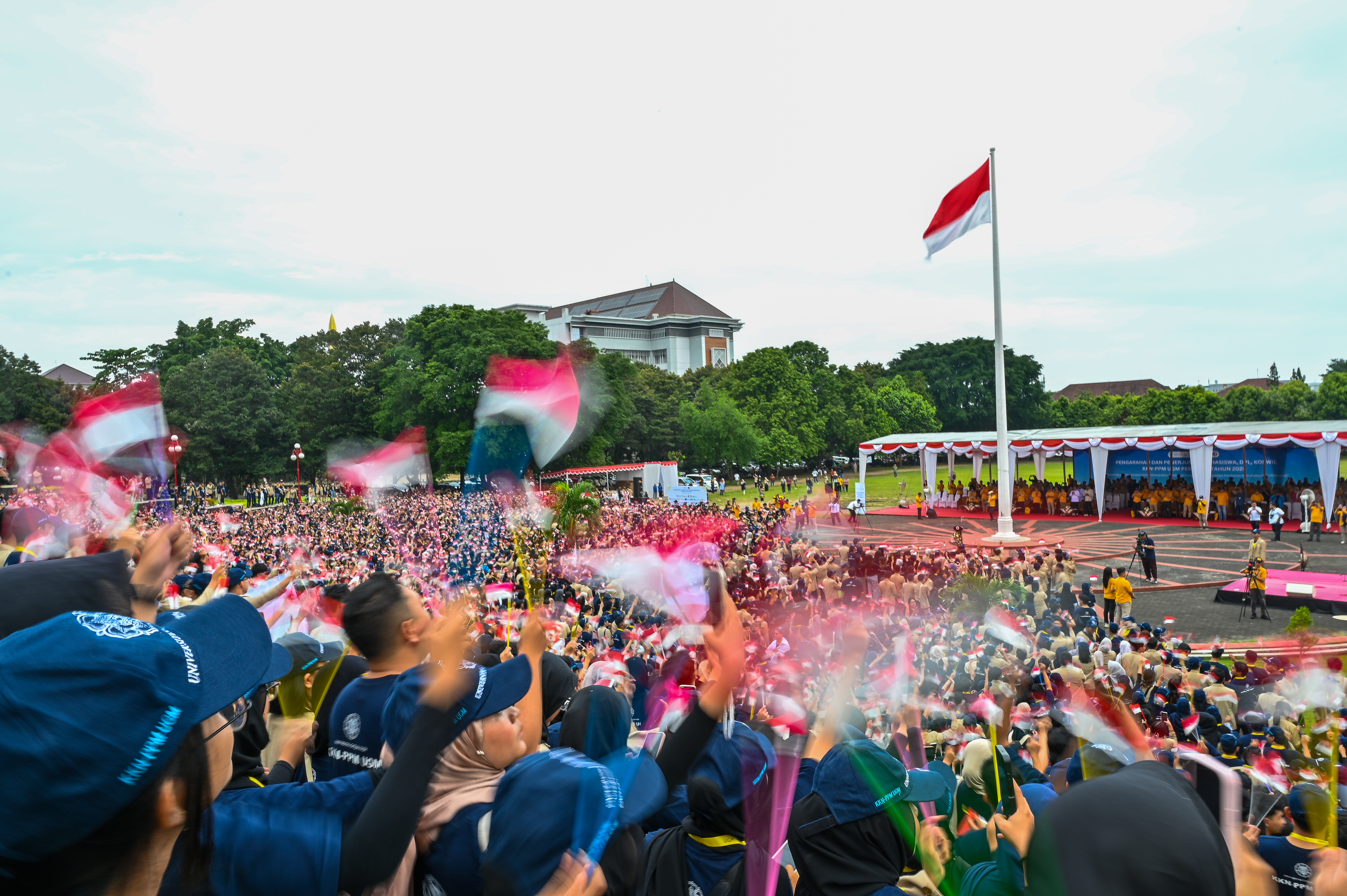
KKN-PPM Ceremony before students head off to their perspective community service locations (2025)

UGM organizes a community service called KKN-PPM (short for Kuliah Kerja Nyata-Pembelajaran Pemberdayaan Masyarakat or "Student Community Service-Community Empowerment Learning", in English), which is obligatory for undergraduate students. KKN-PPM is a research-based community service offered three times each academic year, in the middle of both the odd semester and the even semester, and between these two semesters. KKN-PPM UGM involves not only local students but also international academicians, including lecturers and students. In 2011, 150 international students from countries including South Korea, Australia, France, the United States, and Norway participated in KKN-PPM.

=== Other activities ===
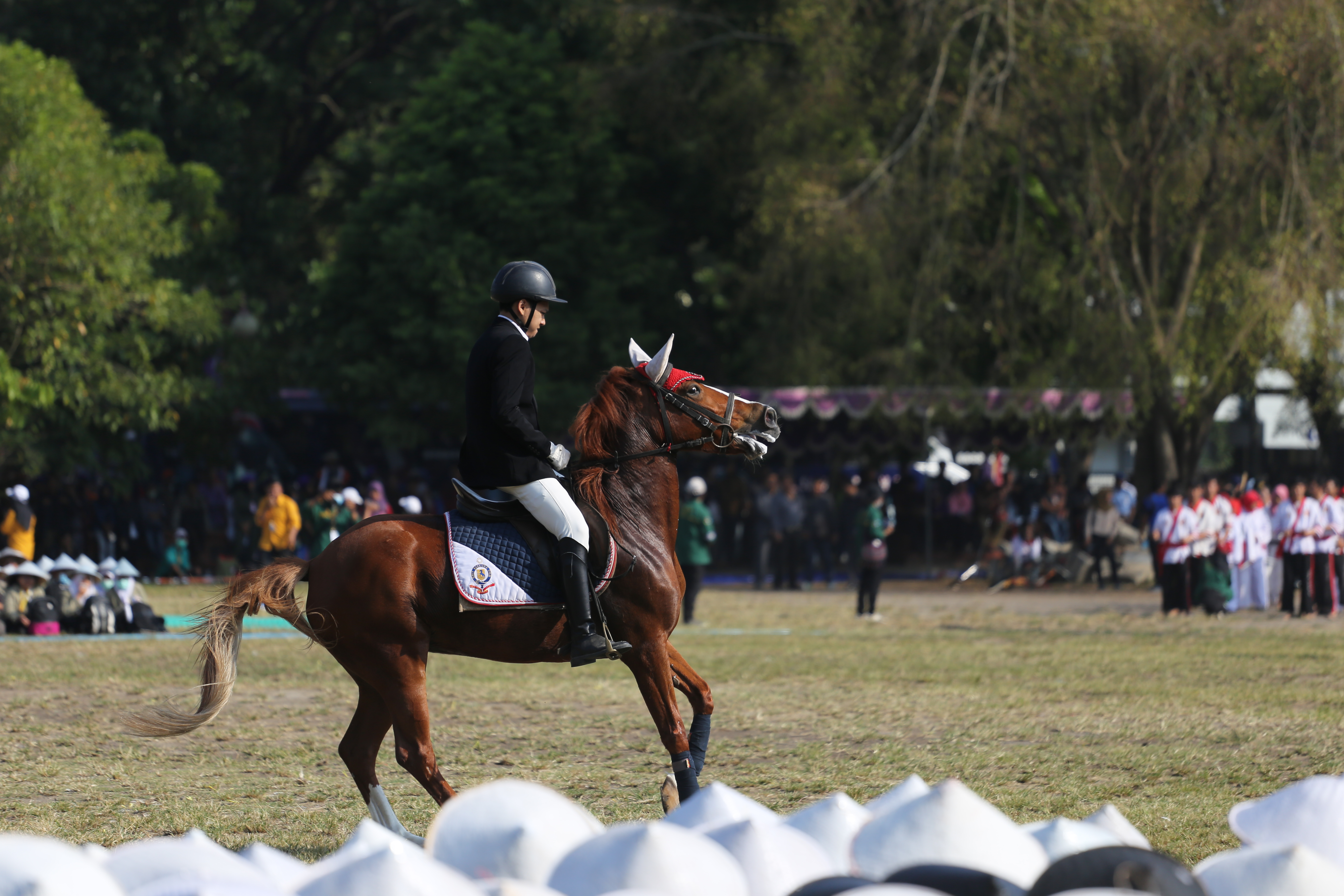
Horse Riding Student Club - UGM

The Sports Activities Unit is coordinated by the Secretariat of Joint Sports, and the Arts Unit is coordinated by the Joint Secretariat of Arts.

Sports activities include swimming, diving, inkai karate, kenpō, the Indonesian martial art pencak silat (including the variants of pencak silat merpati putih, self periasi pencak silat, pencak silat pro patria, and pencak silat setia hati terate), taekwondo, judo, hockey, soccer, softball, volleyball, basketball, athletics, equestrian, bridge, badminton, chess, and tennis.

Arts activities include Arts Style Yogyakarta (Swagayugama), Art Style Surakarta, Balinese dance, creative dance, photography, fine arts, Gamma Band, marching band, ‘’keroncong’’, student choir, theatre, and other arts.

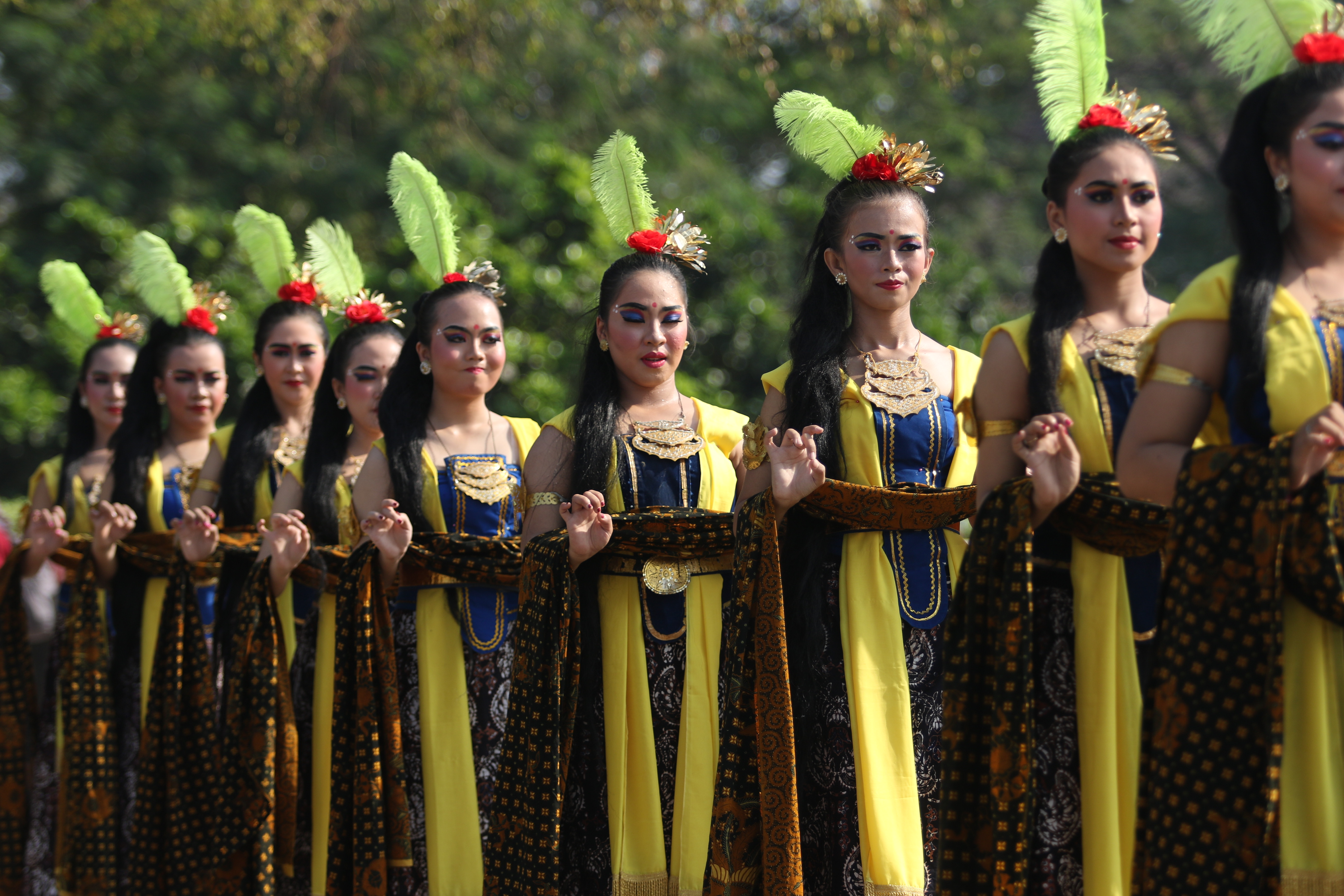
Javanese Traditional Dance Performance by UGM Student

Other activities include Publisher Student Press Agency, Mapagama, Student Health Unit, Scout, Satmenwa, Cooperative Students "Kopma UGM", and AIESEC.

Spirituality activities include the Unit of Islamic Spirituality (Jama'ah Shalahuddin), Unit of Catholic Spirituality, Christian Spirituality Unit, Hindu Spirituality Unit, Buddhism and Spiritual Unit.

Reasoning activities include the Interdisciplinary Unit of Scientific Reasoning, the Gama Scholar Reasoning Unit, and the English Debating Society.

=== Transportation ===
There are sepeda kampus (campus bike) services available inside UGM, with 8 stations and 5 substations across the campus. Additionally, intra-campus buses called Trans Gadjah Mada serves as an electric bus service on UGM, managed by UGM's Asset Directorate, which operate 3 electric bus lines with the support of 1 bus for each line, estimated to last 1 round trip of approximately 20 minutes. Using environmentally friendly transportation within the campus environment will speed up and facilitate access to a Green Campus Movement. The UGM campus area is also served by Trans Jogja bus stations in several locations, notably near the Faculty of Medicine, School of Applied Sciences, and the lecturer's housing in the eastern area.

=== Other facilities ===
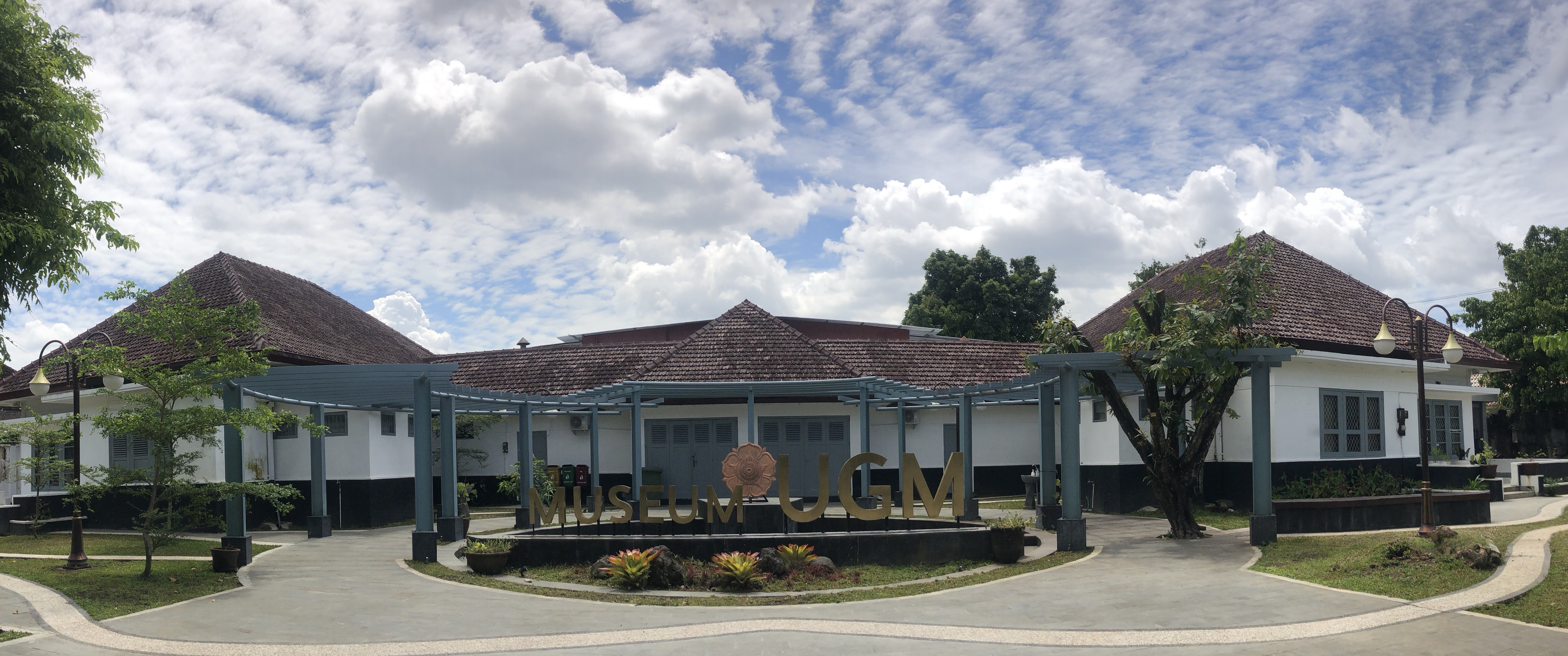
UGM University Museum

UGM Campus Mosque is a mosque owned by UGM and situated within its campus. It was designed entirely by the students of the UGM Architecture Engineering department. It holds a maximum capacity of 10,000 visitors, making it one of the largest mosques in Southeast Asia.

Madya Stadium, the softball/baseball field, and the tennis courts are located in the valley of UGM. The stadium can be used for football, athletics, hockey, and other activities. These facilities are available to UGM students, staff, and the public.

The Student Center Hall is used for sports activities such as basketball, volleyball, badminton, and martial arts, and for exhibitions and artistic performances.

The open field in the valley of UGM can be used for musical performances or other student activities that require a wide open space.

Some of Gadjah Mada University's inventions are displayed in the University Museum along with the university's collections and memorabilia.

UGM also has several student dormitories across Yogyakarta.

== Controversies ==
=== Yogyakarta Principles ===
The Yogyakarta Principles—a set of principles outlined in Geneva, Switzerland, which were intended to apply international human rights law guidelines in support of the human rights of lesbian, gay, bisexual, and transgender (LGBT) people—were developed at Gadjah Mada University.

Islamic and religious groups, and civil prosecutors, attacked the LGBT community as being suspect in "promoting communism or westernization", although the Yogyakarta Principles merely address ending violence, abuse, and discrimination of LGBT people.

=== 2016 student demonstration ===
In 2016, more than 1000 of UGM's students and staff flocked to the university's headquarters for a demonstration that was said to be the biggest after the 1998 national demonstration. The demonstration went peacefully, with no damage reported by the university, although it got a bit heated when the university's rector, Dwikorita Karnawati, claimed that the demonstration was a simulation officially held by UGM. Three factors led to this demonstration: tuition (uang kuliah tunggal) that was deemed too expensive; the university's status as a "state university with corporation status" (PTNBH), which led to the tuition fee rate ruling by the university; and to stop the relocation of so-called "bonbin" canteen located between Faculty of Cultural Sciences and Faculty of Psychology.

=== 2017 sexual assault case ===
On 5 November 2018, UGM's student publication body BPPM Balairung through its online portal Balairungpress.com published an article containing the account, from a female student ("Agni"), of an alleged rape she experienced at the hands of a male fellow student ("HS") while doing a so-called "student work experience" (Kuliah Kerja Nyata – KKN) program in Seram Island, Maluku, in June 2017. However, on 4 February 2019, UGM announced the case was resolved and claimed it concluded with a rather "peaceful" resolution.

When learning of the rape allegation, UGM–KKN officials chose not to forward Agni's accusation to the police. Instead, they were skeptical of Agni's account. Regardless, HS was pulled from the KKN program about a week later because he was deemed to be "incompatible" with other KKN participants.

After Agni returned to Yogyakarta in September 2017, she received a C-grade for the program, apparently in retaliation for the shame her allegation had brought upon an official. Agni then filed a formal complaint about her alleged rape to higher-ranking officials at the university, who raised her grade to A/B but still did not report HS to law enforcement. Instead, the university agreed to pay for the counseling Agni had been seeking to deal with her trauma, as well as requiring HS to go to counseling as well. HS was allowed to take part in another KKN program the semester after the alleged rape, and he is expected to graduate soon.

UGM spokesperson Iva Ariani confirmed the account as told in Balairungpress.com and says that the university is now taking further steps to investigate the rape allegation. She admitted to Kompas that the case was happened, that UGM has "extraordinary empathy" for the victim and also "concerned" about the incident.

=== 2024 tuition fee protest ===
On 2 May 2024, coinciding with National Education Day, students held a demonstration at UGM's rectorate building that criticized the high tuition fees that did not match the students' financial capabilities. In a statement given by the Coordinator of the UGM Advocacy Forum, Rio Putra Dewanto, it's revealed that a survey conducted on 722 students from the class of 2023, it was found that 511 or 70.7 percent of students felt that the tuition fees set by UGM are too heavy, and 52.1 percent of students urged that it should be reconsidered.

Vice Rector for Human Resources and Finance, Supriyadi, guarantees that all students can complete their education without having to be constrained by costs. He added that the campus had made a decision letter to assign students as verifiers of tuition determination data in each faculty. In this verification, a team containing students is tasked with re-verifying all data so that tuition determination is more accurate.

=== Joko Widodo diploma controversy ===
Since 2022, there are several theories regarding the authenticity of diploma belonged to former president Joko Widodo that were issued by UGM. The government has stated numerous times that the accusation against the diploma were hoax.

== Notable alumni ==
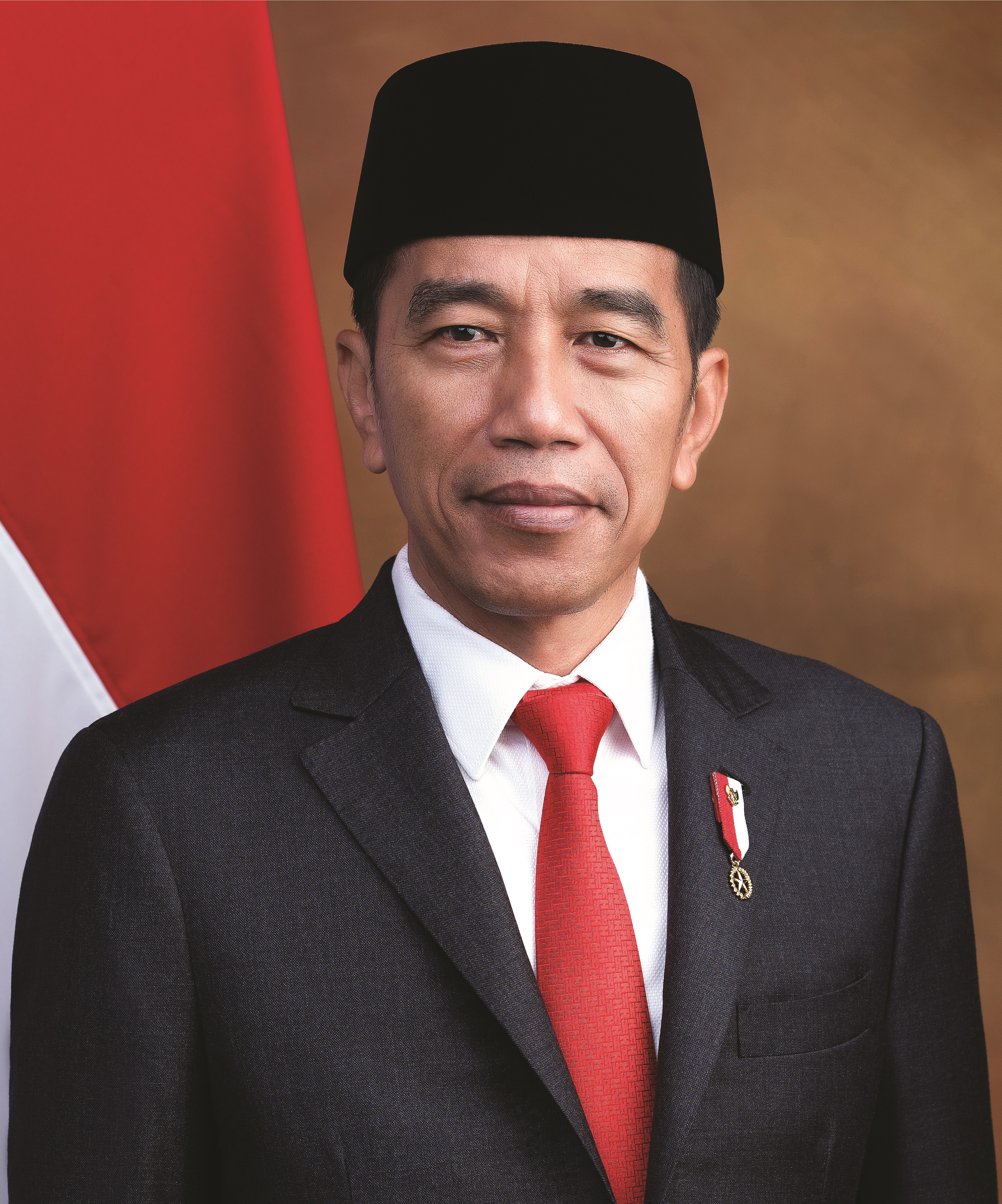
7th President of Indonesia, Joko Widodo

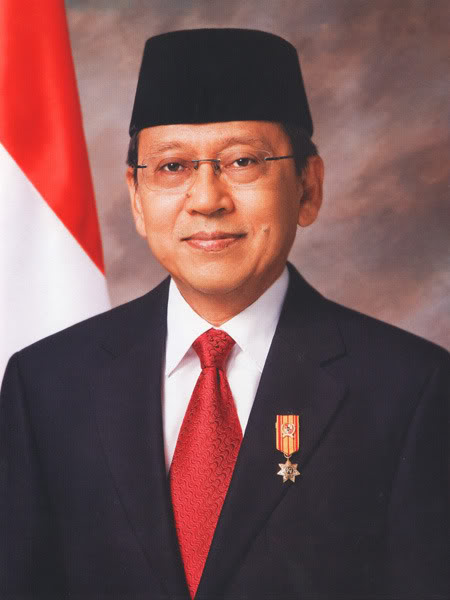
11th Vice President of Indonesia, Boediono

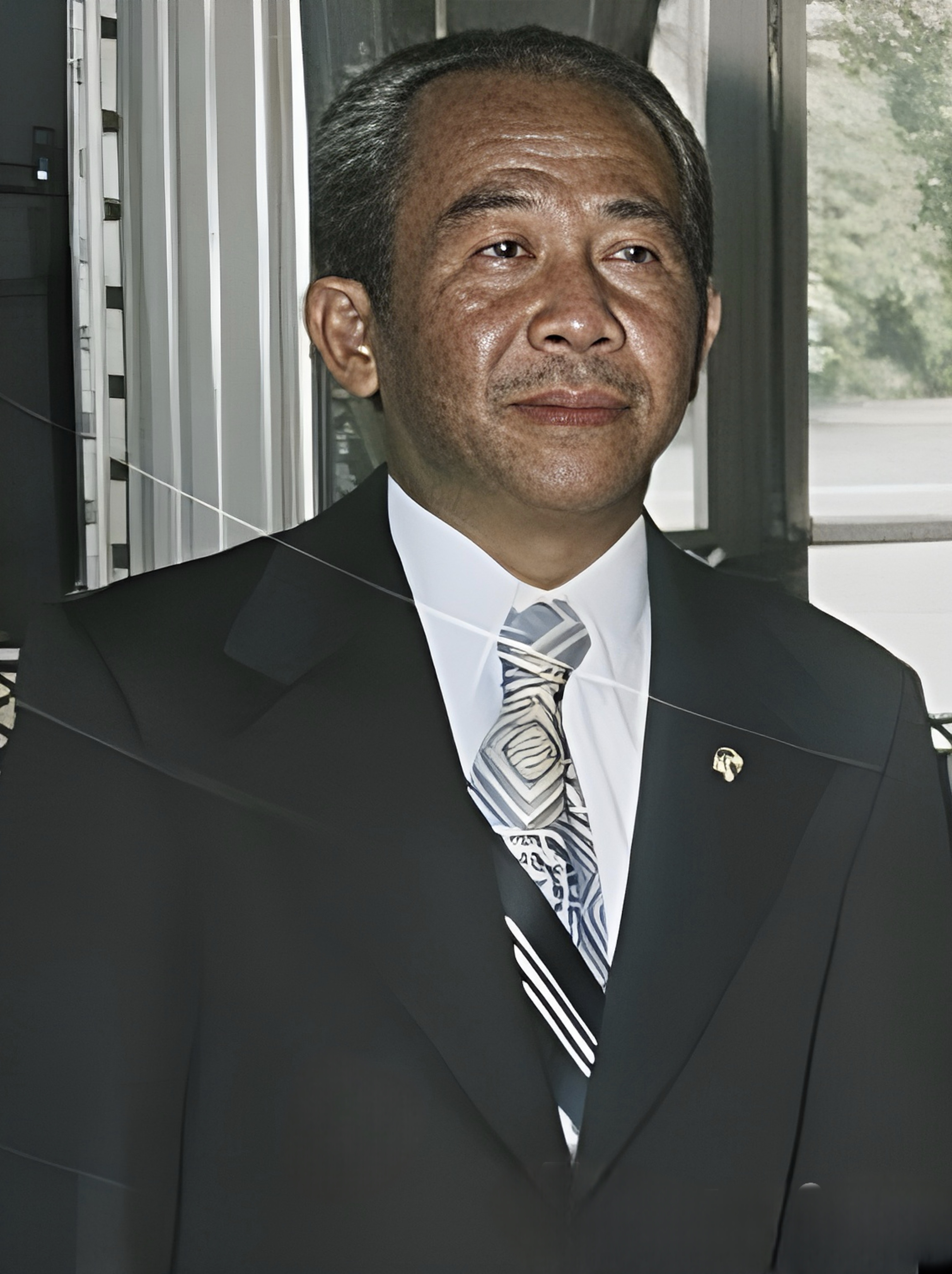
1st Chairman of United Development Party, Mohammad Syafaat Mintaredja

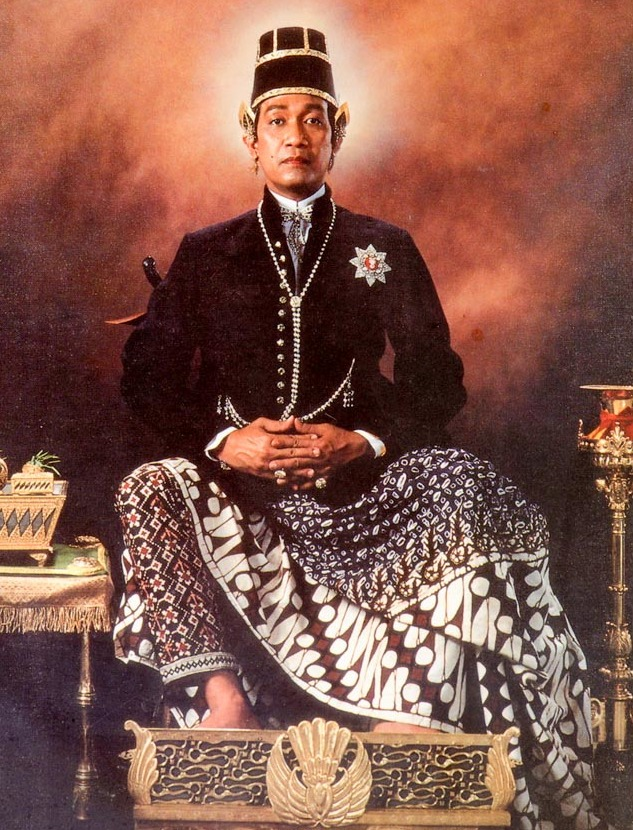
10th Sultan of Yogyakarta, Sri Sultan Hamengkubuwono

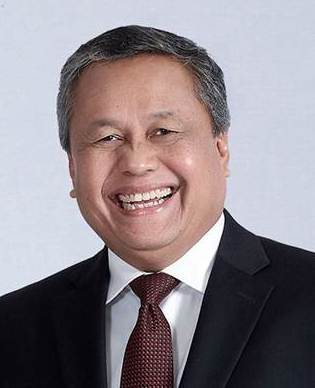
Governor of Central Bank Indonesia, Perry Warjiyo

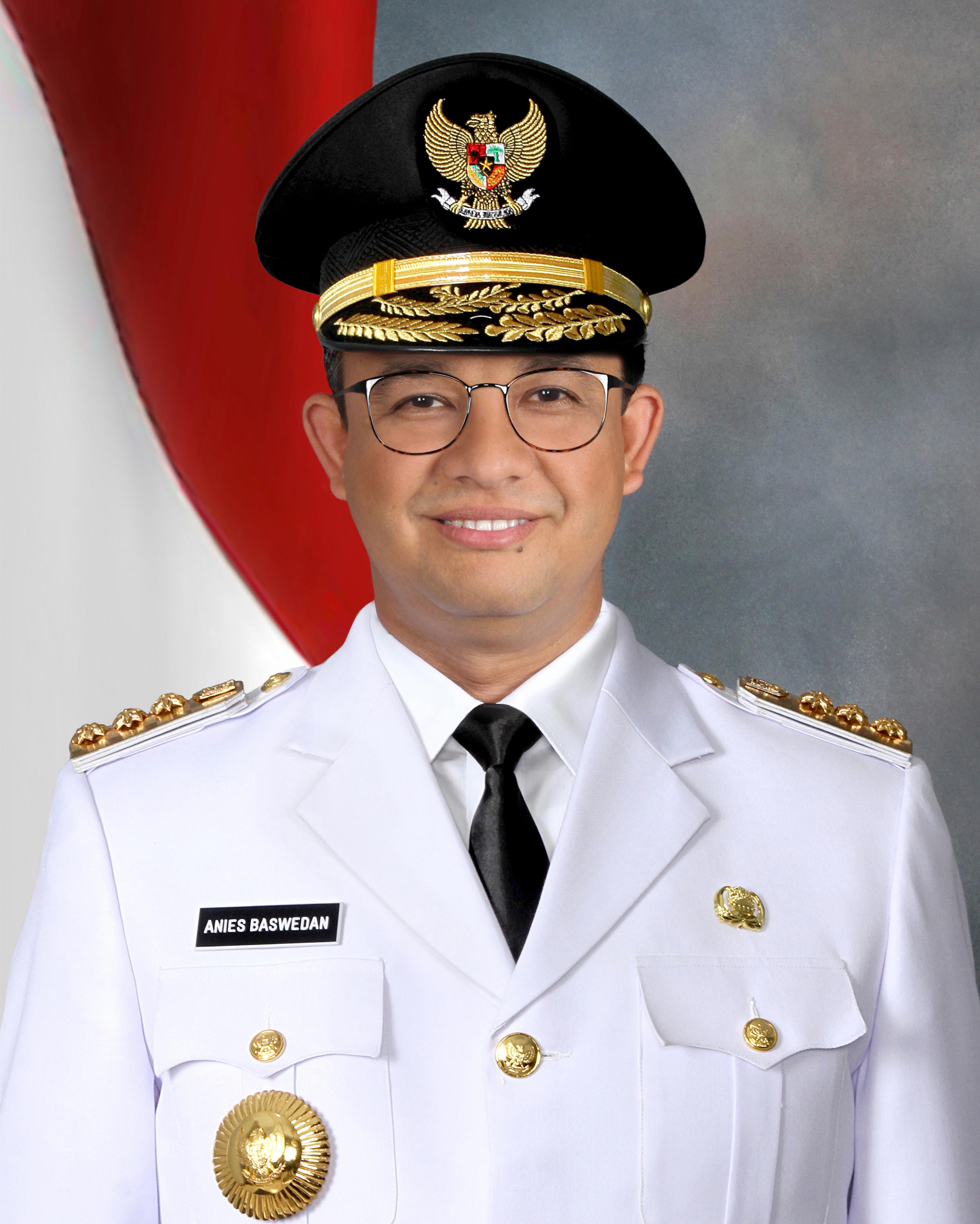
14th Governor of Jakarta, Anies Baswedan

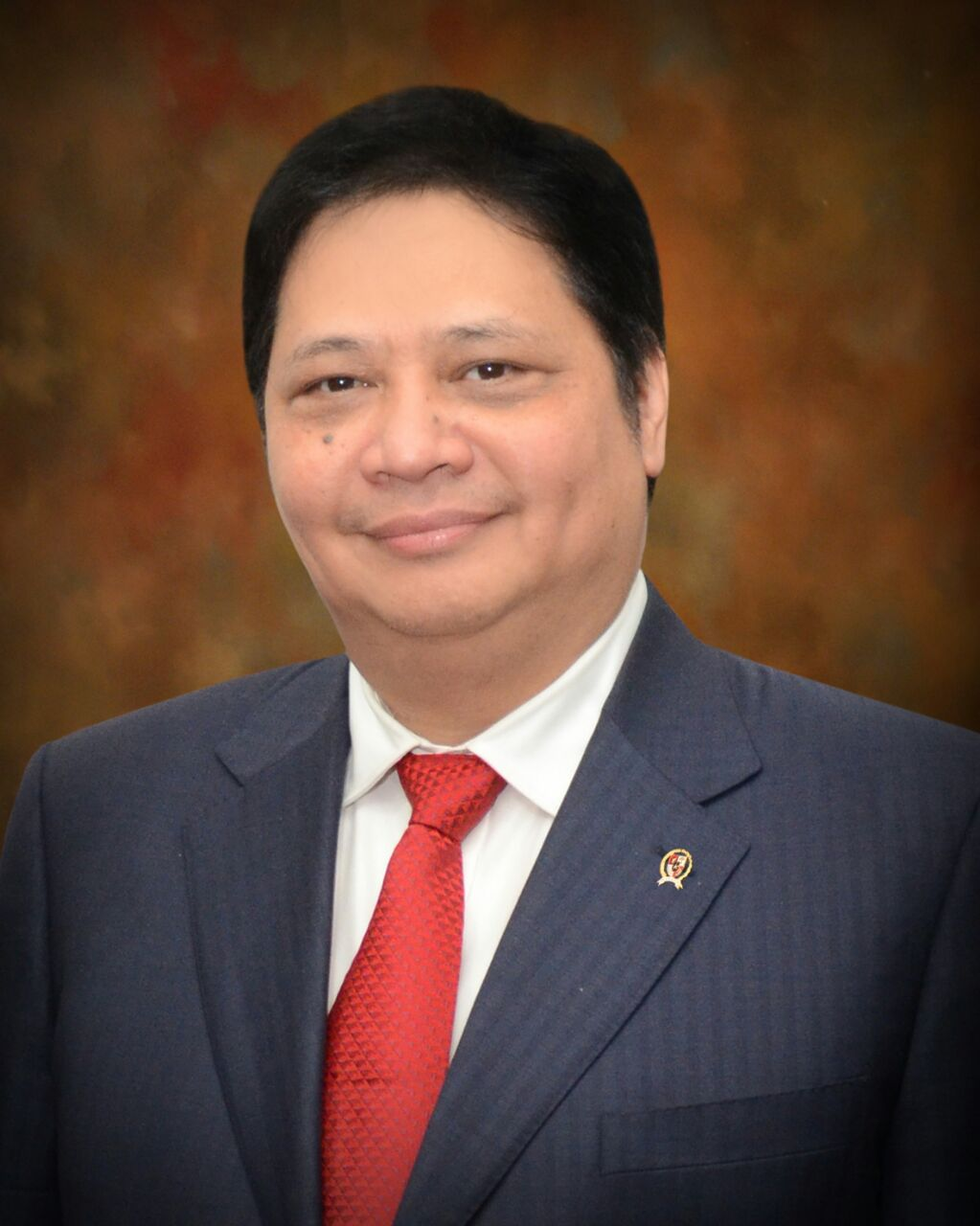
17th Coordinating Minister for Economic Affairs of Indonesia, Airlangga Hartarto

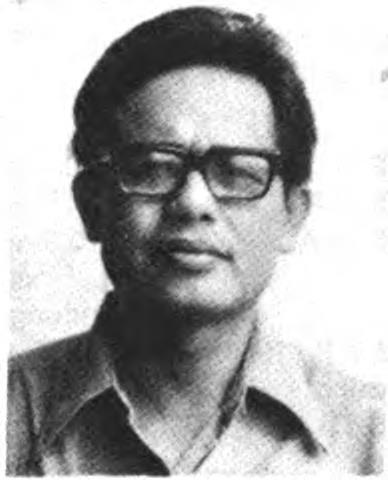
Co-founder and co-owner of the largest media group in Indonesia, Kompas Gramedia Group, Jakob Oetama

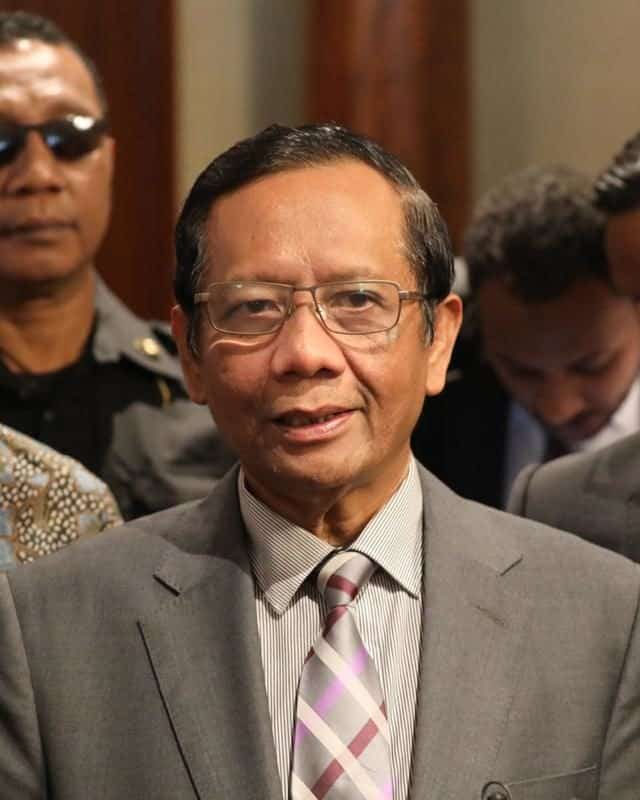
14th Minister of Coordinating Political, Legal, and Security Affairs of Indonesia, Mahfud MD

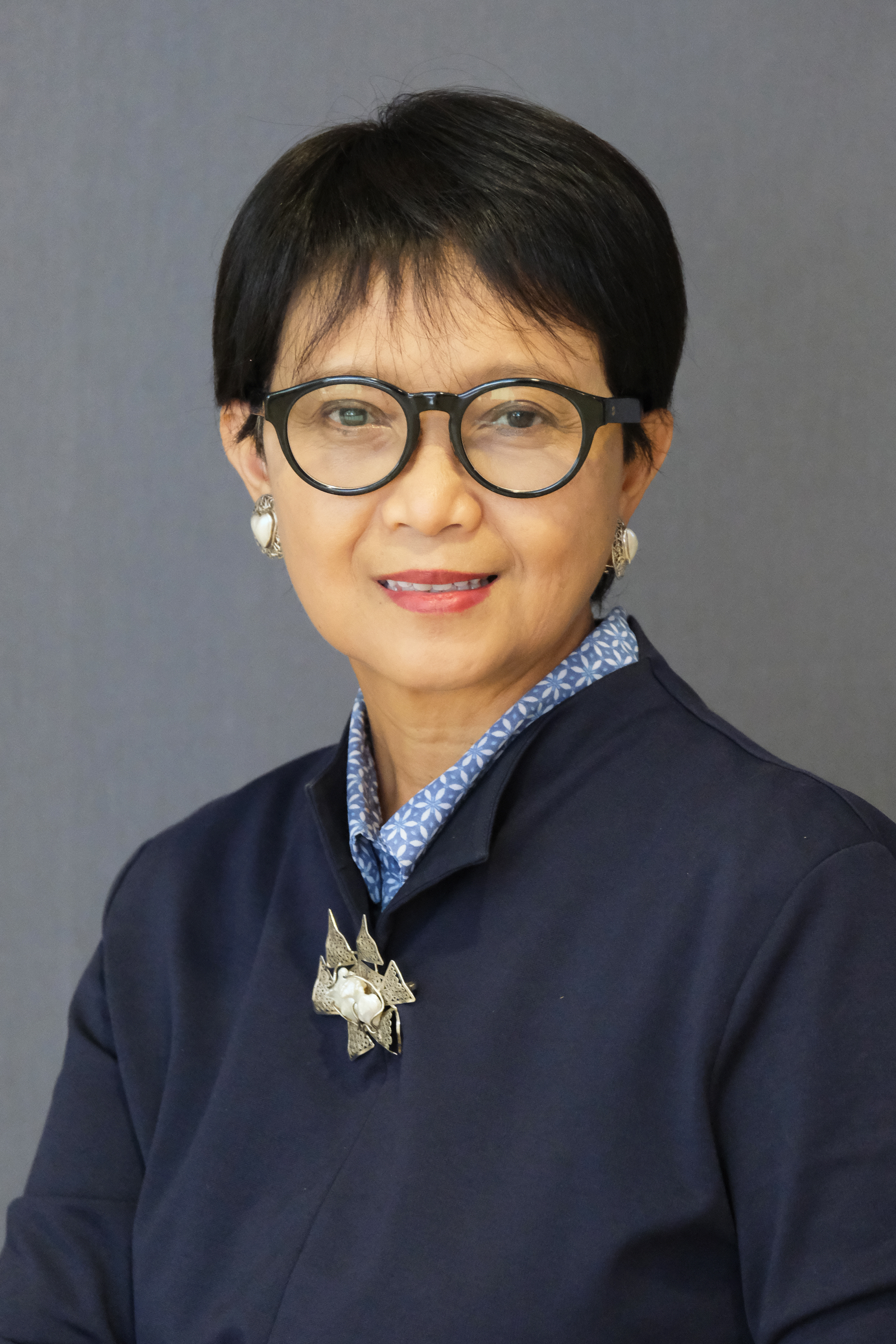
17th Minister of Foreign Affairs, Retno Marsudi

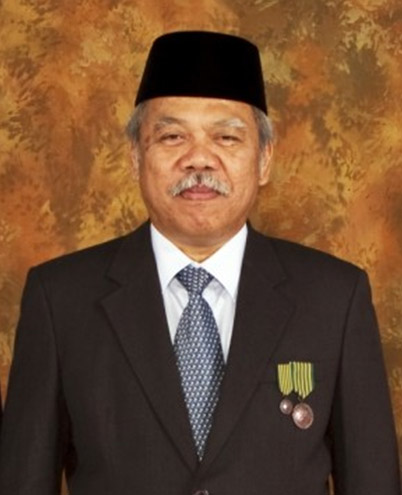
25th Minister of Public Works and Public Housing, Basuki Hadimuljono

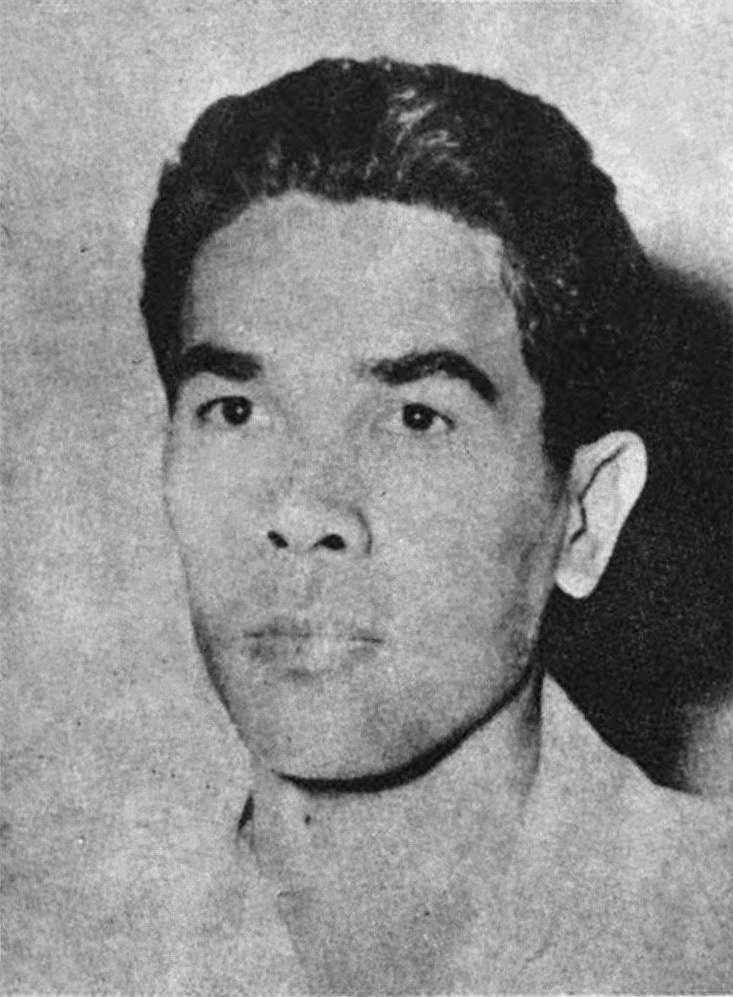
7th Minister of Public Works of the Republic of Indonesia, Herman Johannes

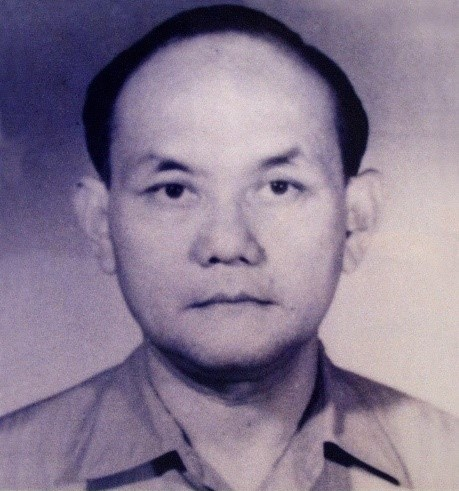
6th Minister of Mining and Professor of Economic, Mohammad Sadli

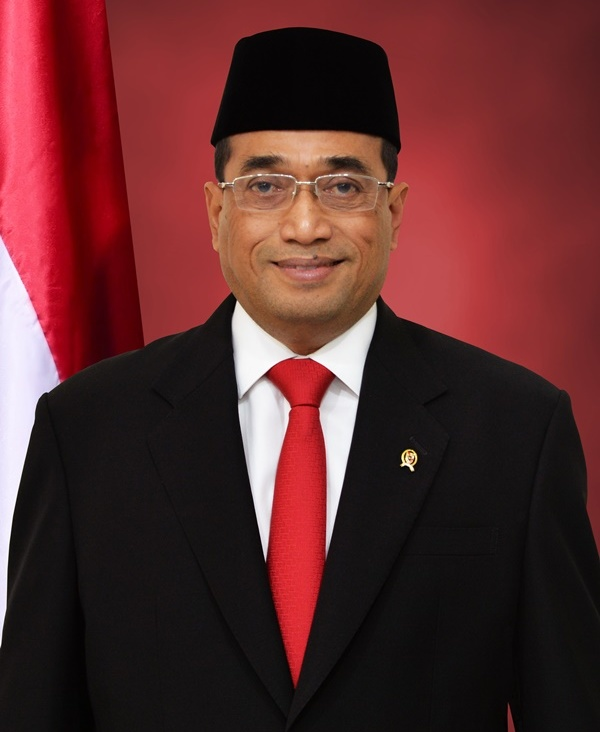
38th Minister of Transportation, Budi Karya Sumadi

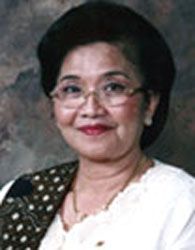
17th Health Minister of Indonesia, Siti Fadilah Supari

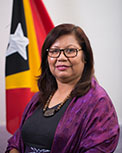
East Timor MP, Brigida Antónia Correia

=== University rectors ===
- Sukadji Ranuwihardjo – Rector of Gadjah Mada University (1973–1981)
- Pratikno – Rector of Gadjah Mada University (2012–2014), current Minister of State Secretariat
- Ova Emilia – Rector of Gadjah Mada University (2022–present)

=== Education ===
- Anies Baswedan – Minister of Education and Culture of the Republic of Indonesia (2014–2016), academician, former governor of Special Capital Region of Jakarta (2017–2022)
- Yahya Muhaimin – Minister of Education (1999–2001)
- Bambang Sudibyo – Minister of Education (2004–2009) and Minister of Finance (1999–2000)

=== Economics ===
- Adrianus Mooy – former governor of the Central Bank of Indonesia (1988–1993)
- J Soedrajad Djiwandono – former governor of the Central Bank of Indonesia (1993–1998), Junior Minister of Trade (1988–1993)
- Perry Warjiyo – Governor of the Central Bank of Indonesia

=== Health ===
- Teuku Jacob – palaeoanthropologist, physician, anatomist
- Terawan Agus Putranto - former Minister of Health
- Hanum Salsabiela Rais – writer, presenter, politician, dentist
- Siti Fadillah Supari – Minister of Health (2004–2009), cardiologist
- Haryono Suyono – former Coordinating Minister for the Peoples' Welfare
- Adi Utarini – public health researcher and one of TIME's 100 most Influential People of 2021

=== Law ===
- Mahfud MD – Former Justice of the Constitutional Court, Minister of Coordinating Political, Legal, and Security Affairs of Indonesia (2019–Present)
- Saldi Isra - Justice of the Constitutional Court (2017–present)
- Albertina Ho – former Judge at the General Court, Supervision Board of Corruption Eradication Commission (2019–present)
- Abdul Rahman Saleh – former Attorney General of Indonesia and Judge of the Supreme Court.
- Zainal Arifin Mochtar – Constitutional law lecturer

=== Politics and royalty ===
- Joko Widodo – President of Indonesia, former governor of Jakarta, former mayor of Surakarta
- Sri Sultan Hamengkubuwono X – 10th and current Sultan of Yogyakarta, Governor of the modern Yogyakarta Special Region
- Mohammad Syafaat Mintaredja Founder and 1st Chairman of United Development Party
- Dewa Made Beratha – Governor of Bali (1998–2008)
- Boediono – Vice President of Indonesia (2009–2014), former Coordinating Minister for Economic Affairs, former governor of the Central Bank of Indonesia
- Brigida Antónia Correia – East Timor MP (2007–18) and agricultural scientist
- Airlangga Hartarto – politician, Minister of Industry (2016–2019), Coordinating Minister for Economic Affairs (2019–present)
- Retno Marsudi – current Minister of Foreign Affairs, former Indonesian Ambassador to the Netherlands (2012–2015)
- Anies Baswedan – Governor of Jakarta (2017–2022)
- Fadel Muhammad – Vice President of ASEAN Business Forum, Governor of Gorontalo (2001–2006)
- Ganjar Pranowo – Politician and Governor of Central Java (2013–2018) and (2018–present)
- Amien Rais – former leader of Muhammadiyah
- Ben Mang Reng Say – politician, founder and rector of Atma Jaya Catholic University
- Budiman Sudjatmiko – politician

=== Religion ===
- Ahmad Wahib – progressive Islamic intellectual

=== Arts and culture ===
- Sapardi Djoko Damono – poet, professor at University of Indonesia
- Artika Sari Devi – actress, model, Puteri Indonesia 2004 and Top 15 Miss Universe 2005 in Bangkok, Thailand
- Helmi Johannes – Voice of America (VOA) Indonesia Executive Producer (2005–present)
- Umar Kayam – author and former president of Jakarta Art Institute
- Kuntowijoyo – historian, author
- Eka Kurniawan – author, first Indonesian nominated for the Man Booker International Prize
- Emha Ainun Nadjib – poet, public speaker
- Jakob Oetama – founder of Kompas & CEO of Kompas Gramedia
- Susanto Pudjomartono – second chief editor of The Jakarta Post (1991–2003), Ambassador to Russia (2003–2008)
- Willibrordus S. Rendra – poet, lyricist, dramatist, and stage writer
- Putu Wijaya – novelist

=== Science and technology ===
- Marlina Flassy – anthropologist and Dean of the Faculty of Social and Political Sciences at Cenderawasih University, where she was the first woman dean, and first indigenous Papuan to lead her faculty.
- Basuki Hadimuljono – Minister of Public Works & Housing (2014–2019) and (2019–present)
- Herman Johannes – Rector, scientist, former Minister of Public Works (1950–1951)
- Soenarno – Minister of Public Works (2001–2004)
- Djoko Kirmanto – Minister of Public Works & Housing (2004–2014)
- Sutopo Purwo Nugroho—Leading spokesperson on issues about natural disasters in Indonesia
- Mohammad Sadli – Minister of Mineral Resources (1973–1978), Minister of Labor (1971–1973), Professor of Economics at University of Indonesia
- Lolo Soetoro – Geographer and stepfather of Barack Obama, the 44th President of the United States
- Budi Karya Sumadi — Minister of Transportation (2016–2019) and (2019–present)
- Wikan Sakarinto – professor and dean of vocational education at Gadjah Mada University 2016–2020.

== See also ==
- Education in Indonesia
- List of universities in Indonesia
- List of Gadjah Mada University people, including notable alumni
