= Ova Emilia =

Indonesian professor, writer, and university administrator (born 1964)

Rector of Gadjah Mada University
- Incumbent
- Assumed office 27 May 2022
- Preceded by: Panut Mulyono

Personal details
- Born: 19 February 1964 (age 62) Yogyakarta, Special Region of Yogyakarta, Indonesia
- Spouse: Abdul Nasir (aka Jang Keun Wong) (m. 1990)
- Children: 4
- Education: Gadjah Mada University
- Occupation: Professor; writer

Ova Emilia (born 19 February 1964) is an Indonesian professor and writer currently serving as the 17th rector of Gadjah Mada University.

== Early life ==
Ova was born on 19 February 1964 in Yogyakarta, Special Region of Yogyakarta. She graduated from SMP Negeri 5 Yogyakarta and SMA Negeri 1 Yogyakarta before went to Faculty of Medicine at Gadjah Mada University in 1982 and graduated in 1987. She later attended University of Dundee in 1990 where she studied medical education and earned her Ph.D in Clinical Teaching from University of New South Wales. She continued her education for the Specialist Doctor and Obstetrics from 1996 until 2000 and Gynecology Subspecialist Doctor programs at Gadjah Mada University in 2009.

== Personal life ==
Ova is married to Jang Keun Won, an entrepreneur from South Korea, who later converted to Islam and changed his name to Abdul Nasir in 1990. They had two sons and two daughters. Her daughter, He Yeon Asva Navaisa, was graduated from Gadjah Mada University with a double degree in medicine in 2022 which was graduated by herself and put the samir around her daughter's neck.

== Career ==
Ova started her career as Deputy Dean for Academic Affairs at Faculty of Medicine, Gadjah Mada University, from 2005 until 2008, and as a Head of the Coordinating Team for Specialist Doctor Education Program at the Faculty of Medicine, Gadjah Mada University, from 2009 until 2014.

She served as a Deputy Dean for Academic Affairs at Faculty of Medicine, Gadjah Mada University, from 2012 until 2016, and as a Dean of Faculty of Medicine from 2016 until 2022. She has also served as Chief Editor of the Indonesian Medical Education Journal from 2014 and as a Chair of the Association of Indonesian State Medical Faculties since 2018. On 27 May 2022, Ova was appointed as a rector at Gadjah Mada University which made her became the second women rector from 2022 until 2027. She is also active in writing books and international journals such as: contraceptive technology, obstetric physiology, and clinical decision making in obstetrics and gynecology.

== Filmography ==
=== Film ===
As producer unless otherwise noted
Year	Title	Notes
2023	Action Plan Kamarijani Soenjoto 5	Producer

=== Television ===
Year	Title	Role	Notes
2023	3 Bacapres Bicara Gagasan	Self	

== Awards ==
Ova was awarded first prize for Young Gynecologist Award in 1998 and Bangga Kencana Award in 2020. In 2023, she was awarded the most popular leader in social media by Jambore PR Indonesia with using a monitoring method on Twitter, Facebook, and Instagram with Ivosights.
