= June 2026 Indonesian protests =

Student-led protests in Indonesia

June 2026 Indonesia protest (Indonesian: Unjuk rasa 12 Juni 2026 di Indonesia) also known as Indonesian Bankruptcy Demonstration (Indonesian: Demontrasi Indonesia Menuju Bangkrut) is a series of demonstrations that began on June 12, 2026 to protest the poor management of the state and its budget during the leadership of Prabowo Subianto and Gibran Rakabuming Raka. This demonstration was initially initiated by the Student Executive Board of the University of Indonesia and was planned to be held at the Selamat Datang Monument, but also appeared in other places such as Bandung, Yogyakarta, Semarang, Pekanbaru, Makassar, Kendari, Manado, Majalengka, Surakarta, Banjarmasin, Parepare, Lampung, Bengkulu, Palembang, Bali, Surabaya, Kupang, Malang, and Medan.

Even though it was initially planned to be held solely at 12 June, some protests were held before the date and some after it. The protests also led to discussions of a possible Reformasi Part II.

== Background ==
=== Economy ===
Since May, the rupiah exchange rate steadily weakened until touching IDR 17,670 per USD, the lowest ever recorded. The trend continued until touching 18,200 at 8 June. According to a tempo.co analysis, the trend was triggered by dollar strengthening, global volatility, current account deficit, domestic inflation, high dependence on imports, and capital flight from Indonesian financial markets. IHSG also plummeted to below 5,400.

Non-subsidised fuel price also hiked significantly without prior warning, shocking vehicle users.

=== Governance and policies ===
This was also accompanied by the revelation of the mega corruption scandal of the Free Nutritious Meals (Indonesian: Makan Bergizi Gratis) program carried out by the National Nutrition Agency Head himself. The Attorney General's Office of Indonesia announced three members of the leadership as suspects of the 2025–2026 Free Meals corruption case. The three are Agency Head Dadan Hindayana, Deputy Head Sony Sanjaya (Note: Retired Indonesian Police inspector general), and Deputy Head Lodewijk F. Paulus (Note: Retired Indonesian Army mayor general).

According to investigators, the program is suspected to be used for corruption through partner kitchen operators affiliated with the officials. The suspects are alleged to manipulate partner verification process to ensure they pass and receive trillions of rupiah of incentive, and appropriated funds for goods and services by price markup. Projects investigated include procurement for electric motorbikes, shoes, tablet computers, and TVs.

Nanik Sudaryati Deyang was appointed Dadan's successor, Agustina Arumsari as Sony's successor, and Trenggono as Lodewijk's successor. Previosuly, Nanik was a deputy head. She has background as a journalist and was a member of the Prabowo Subianto 2024 presidential campaign team in the 2024 Indonesian presidential election.

The appointment caused controversy. Former UGM Student Union President Tiyo Ardianto strongly criticised that Nanik does not have the proper compentences needed to lead the Agency. He also stated that Prabowo's Red and White Cabinet, puts political loyalty competence and morality in government appointments.

Another protested program is the Red and White Cooperative (KDMP). It is strongly criticised as its management is not in line cooperative principles of democracy and voluntary association, while the structure, business model, and mechanism is controlled by the central government. Most of village budgets are also allocated to it. This policy is feared to reduce the fiscal space for village governments to execute their own development programs. Other criticised points include the involvement of the Indonesian Army in overseeing construction of the cooperatives, import of 105,000 pickups from India, and lack of clarity on budget source for salaries.

=== Failure of police reforms ===
The Indonesian House of Representatives ratified the Indonesian Police Act after having ratified the Indonesian National Armed Forces Act. These acts are democratic backsliding strengthenings of the police and army, and caused concern that it would allow police officers and soldiers to occupy positions that should be held by civilians, disappointing many who had hoped for comprehensive reform of the police. This law was immediately challenged in the Indonesian Constitutional Court because it was deemed to not meet the requirements for public participation.

Previously, there had been many objections to the bill, but calls for police reform are unheeded. Mahfud MD, who was a member of the Indonesian Police Reform Acceleration Commission, expressed his disappointment that their recommendations were unheeded and the Police Bill was ratified.

=== Fears of Bank of Indonesia independence loss ===
The nomination of Prabowo's nephew Thomas Djiwandono as the Bank Indonesia Deputy Governor causes concerns that it will erode Bank Indonesia's institutional independence. He is seen as having insufficient experience for the role. However, the House of Representatives deny that it is an instance of corruption, collusion, and nepotism (KKN) in strategic governmental appointments.

=== Foreign coverage ===
Several foreign media outlets have also expressed concerns about the leadership in Indonesia, such as The Economist, which considers Prabowo's government to be wasteful and authoritarian. SCMP highlighted Prabowo's hobby of traveling abroad, with the results of his visits being questioned. Meanwhile, Bloomberg published coverage of the loss of investor confidence due to haphazard policy formulation.

=== Anti-critical stance ===
This situation was not addressed responsively by the government, which instead made irrelevant denials, such as blaming foreign powers, ordering people to pick up shares that were falling, to vaguely promising that the rupiah will return to IDR 15,000 per USD without clear explanation of the steps to achieve it. Prabowo also insisted on continuing the Free Meals, even though it is already entangled in corruption and many are voicing their desire for this program to be stopped. As of September 2026, the change.org petition has been signed by over 63,000 people.

Repeat warnings that the program has poisoned 38,000 students are never seriously addressed. Initially, Prabowo minimised the number as being "just a 0.00017% error rate in the Free Meals management". He also emphasises that the program will not be stopped, saying, "I will hold out. As much as I can. Instead of being corrupted, it's better that my people can eat."

Eventually, after various mass poisonings and corruption cases, 2,162 kitchens were temporarily closed. BGN Head Nanik, after the arrest of her predecessor by the Attorney General's Office, admitted that 8,182 kitchens had been temporarily closed. Coordinating Minister for Food Affairs Zulkifli Hasan admitted suspicions of commercialisation of kitchens, resulting in an overbudget of IDR 1 trillion/month.

Even though claiming himself to be democratic and open to criticisms, Prabowo and his officials are defensive and very reactive in response to criticisms and input. Amnesty International Indonesia criticised the ease with which the label "foreign agent" (antek-antek asing) is given to those who criticised the government. There are also threats to "control" observers, which is seen as a governmental anti-critical stance.

=== Plummeting approval ===
Dissatisfaction with Prabowo's stances and policies are reflected in the continuous plummeting of the approval rating, which plummeted from 79.9% in February to 72.2% in May.

A few days before the protests, after the arrest of the BGN head for corruption, Indopol announced that Prabowo's approval rating nosedived to 59.75%.

== Timeline ==
=== 10–11 June ===
A few days prior, information appeared on social media that BEM UI will stage a protest at the Selamat Datang Monument on 12 June 10am with the tagline of "Indonesian Bankruptcy Demonstration".

On 10 June, the Bengkulu University Student Executive Board held a protest at the Bengkulu provincial legislature. The protest involved tire burnings. In Surabaya, protests were held in front of Bank Indonesia East Java.

On 11 June, protests were held at the East Java Regional House of Representatives with demands of total reformation, which resulted in four students temporarily taken into custody. Students proclaim that protests will continue the next day. Protests were also held in Makassar and Kendari.

On that day, there were also three protests in Jakarta. Protests were held at Jalan Medan Merdeka Selatan by the Cipayung Plus South Jakarta movement and in front of the BGN office by the North Maluku Forum. Another protest was in front of the BRI and KPK buildings to demand a thorough investigation of the BRI and Telkom corruption, held by the Logis 08 movement.

On 12 June, around 11AM, protestors from BEM UI was blockaded in Senayan and forbidden from proceeding to the Selamat Datang Monument. They were asked to protest in front of Kompleks Parlemen instead. The police told the students to just run them over if the students insist on going on. The students refused to stop and marched on to the monument. In front of the UOB building at Jalan Jenderal Sudirman they were again blockaded by the police and army, resulting in tensions due to shoving between students and security forces. At afternoon, students from IPB and UPN Jakarta joined and protests continued to nighttime.

Protests were also held in Rawamangun by UNJ students, front of the Central Java legislature, Semarang by Undip students, and Kupang by Aliansi NTT Menggugat.

=== 13–14 June ===
On 13 June, there were protests inspired by and in solidarity with the 12 June protest. Some Jakarta International Marathon runners changed clothes to black and/or add satirical comments toward the government, in line with the protests demands.

Another protest was held at Gejayan, Sleman, Yogyakarta by Aliansi Rakyat Memanggil, who voiced 10 demands. Another protest was also held in Purwokerto.

On 14 June night, a protest was held in front of the North Sumatra Attorney General's Office building in Medan by KAMAK, which demanded investigation of alleged corruption of Free Meals and the 2023 Binjai Fiscal Incentive.

=== 15 June ===
On 15 June, the protests wave spreads. In Jakarta, protests were held in front of Istana Negara by BEM Universitas Bung Karno, SEMA Universitas Paramadina, Aliansi Mahasiswa Universitas MH Thamrin, and BEM UHAMKA; at the Selamat Datang Monument by the West Jakarta Indonesian National Student Movement, Universitas Nasional Culture and Action Collective, and Keluarga Besar Universitas Terbuka; in front of Kompleks Parlemen by BEM Universitas Muhammadiyah Tangerang; and in Kwitang, Senen by the Jambi BEM SI. However, like the 12 June protests, planned protests at the monument was forbidden and blockaded by the police again.

In Medan, civil alliances and hundreds of North Sumatra University students staged a protest taglined #TowardsFailedIndonesia in front of the North Sumatra Regional House of Representatives and earned an audience with Speaker Erni Ariyanti Sitorus. In Bandung, students from Greater Bandung held a protest in front of the West Java Regional House of Representatives. In Makassar, a protest was held under the Jalan Urip Sumoharjo and Jalan AP Pettarani flyover, with students holding a container truck hostage.
