= Agung Gumilar Saputra =

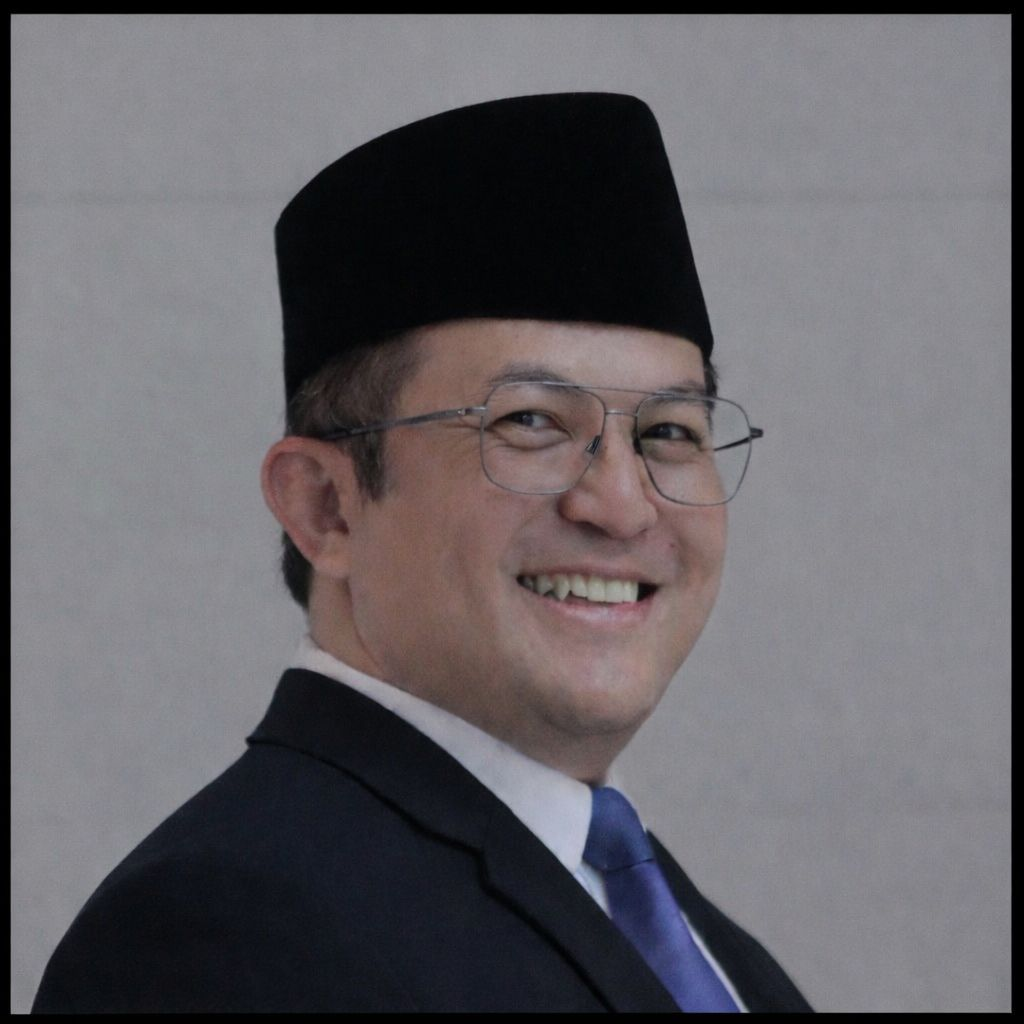

Special Staff to the President of Indonesia Strategic Data Analysis
- Incumbent
- Assumed office 8 October 2025
- President: Prabowo Subianto

Personal details
- Born: June 12, 1979 (age 47) Tangerang, Banten, Indonesia
- Spouse: Sindy Dewiana
- Children: 3
- Education: Taruna Nusantara Senior High School (1997) Virginia Military Institute, United States (2001); Swiss German University, Indonesia (2006); Hochschule Konstanz, Germany (2006); Curtin University, Australia (2016) Oslo Metropolitan University, Norway (2024)

Military service
- Branch/service: Indonesian Army
- Years of service: 2002–2005
- Rank: First Lieutenant
- Unit: Infantry (Kopassus)

Agung Gumilar Saputra is an Indonesian data and strategic analyst who currently serves as a member of the Special Staff to the President of the Republic of Indonesia for Strategic Data Analysis. He has professional expertise in civil engineering, management, finance, accounting, and information technology. A graduate of Taruna Nusantara Senior High School, he previously served in the Indonesian Army between 2002 and 2005.

== Early life ==
Agung Gumilar Saputra was born in Tangerang, Banten, on 12 June 1979. He graduated from Taruna Nusantara Senior High School in 1997. He was among the recipients of a scholarship program initiated by Prabowo Subianto for high-achieving students.

== Education ==
Agung continued his studies at the Virginia Military Institute in the United States, earning a Bachelor of Science degree in Civil Engineering. He later pursued postgraduate education at several international institutions, obtaining a Master of Management (MM) from Swiss German University in Indonesia (2006), an MBA in Finance from Hochschule Konstanz in Germany, a Master of Commerce (Accounting) from Curtin University in Australia (2016), and a master's degree in Applied Computer and Information Technology from Oslo Metropolitan University in Norway.

As of 2025, Agung is pursuing doctoral studies at the Institute of Home Affairs Governance (IPDN) and the School of Business and Management, Bandung Institute of Technology (ITB).

== Career ==
After completing his education in the United States, Agung was commissioned as an officer in the Indonesian Army through the career officer track. Holding the rank of Second Lieutenant (Infantry), he was assigned to the elite Special Forces Command (Kopassus). He served at the Special Forces Training Center (Pusdikpasus) until taking early retirement in 2005. Thereafter, he worked as a personal and strategic assistant to Prabowo Subianto, focusing primarily on data analysis and the preparation of strategic and presentation materials.

While living abroad as part of the Indonesian diaspora, Agung founded a service-oriented company in Australia. During his residence in Norway, he co-founded the startup ClearKarbon Exchange and served as its Chief Technology Officer.

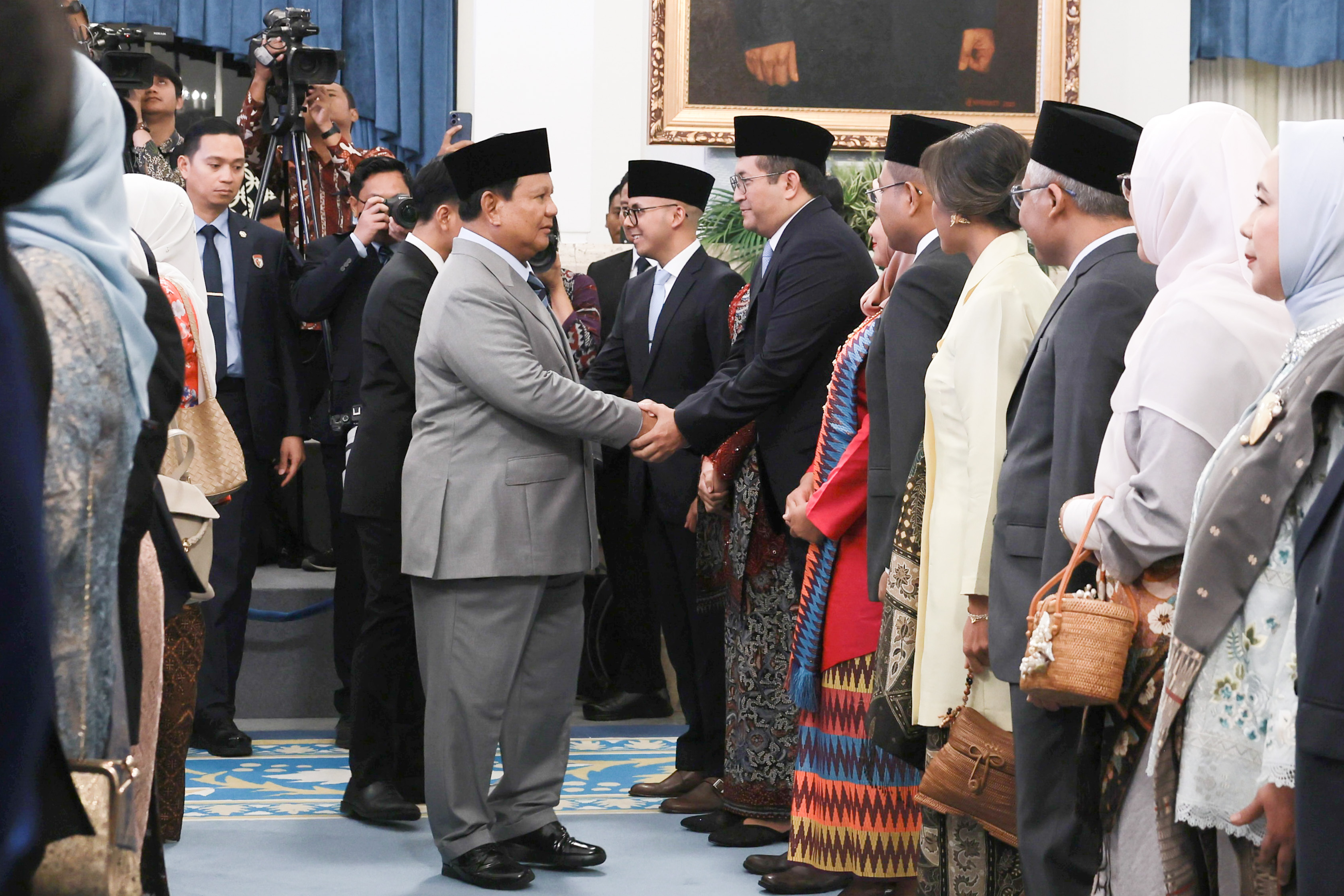
Agung Gumilar Saputra at his inauguration as Special Staff to the President

In 2024, Agung returned to Indonesia and joined the Presidential Assistance Team led by Sjafrie Sjamsoeddin. He was involved in drafting implementation strategies for major government programs, formulating policy frameworks and legal foundations, and designing newly established government bodies. This experience led to his appointment to the Presidential Palace.

On 8 October 2025, Agung was officially appointed as Special Staff to the President of Indonesia for Strategic Data Analysis by Presidential Decree No. 33/M of 2025.
