= Sudaryono =

Indonesian politician

- Official portrait in 2026

Head of National Nutrition Agency
- Incumbent
- Assumed office 22 July 2026
- President: Prabowo Subianto
- Lieutenant: Agustina Arumsari; Trenggono
- Preceded by: Nanik Sudaryati Deyang

Deputy Minister of Agriculture
- In office 18 July 2024 – 22 July 2026
- President: Joko Widodo; Prabowo Subianto
- Minister: Amran Sulaiman
- Preceded by: Harvick Hasnul Qolbi
- Succeeded by: Muhammad Saleh Mustafa

Personal details
- Born: 23 January 1985 (age 41) Toroh, Grobogan, Indonesia
- Party: Gerindra
- Education: Taruna Nusantara; National Defense Academy of Japan; Swiss German University; IPB University
- Occupation: Politician; Businessman
- Website: sudaryono.id

Sudaryono (born 23 January 1985), also known as Mas Dar, is an Indonesian politician and businessman who has served as Head of the National Nutrition Agency since 22 July 2026. His tenure has been marked by the continued occurrence of mass food poisoning incidents linked to the Free Nutritious Meals (MBG) program and uncertainty over law enforcement against those responsible, despite the number of victims continuing to increase, with as many as 2,000 cases occurring within a three-day period. He stated that the food-poisoning issue was only receiving widespread attention on social media and was politically and ideologically motivated.

Previously, Sudaryono served as Deputy Minister of Agriculture from 2024 to 2026. He also served concurrently as President Commissioner of Pupuk Indonesia, despite the Constitutional Court prohibiting him from holding the position through Decision No. 128/PUU-XXIII/2025. He is a former personal assistant to Prabowo Subianto.

As a businessman, Sudaryono operates numerous businesses in the media, food, technology, and healthcare sectors. He is the CEO of Garuda TV, CEO of PT Nusantara Telematics System, CEO of PT Indonesian Defense and Security Technologies, chairman of PT Sahabat Sejati Sejahtera Farma, and chairman of PT Boga Halal Nusantara. The latter company operates in the food sector, dealing in products such as beef, goat meat, chicken eggs, and fish.

Within the Gerindra, Sudaryono has served as Chairman of the Gerindra Regional Leadership Council (DPD) of Central Java since 18 October 2023.

== Early life and education ==
Sudaryono is the only son of Yahyo and Suwarni, a farming family from Mangunrejo, Tambirejo, Toroh District, Grobogan. After completing elementary school in 1997 and graduating from State Junior High School 2 Toroh, Grobogan, in 2000, he received a scholarship to attend Taruna Nusantara High School in Magelang, where he graduated as the school's top student in 2003.

In 2004, Sudaryono received a scholarship to pursue his undergraduate studies at the National Defense Academy of Japan, majoring in mechanical engineering, and graduated in 2009 with a Bachelor of Engineering degree. He then pursued his studies at Swiss German University in Tangerang in 2015 and graduated in 2018, earning dual master's degrees in Management and Business Administration. He pursued doctoral studies in management and business at Bogor Agricultural University in 2020 and received his Doctorate in 2025.

== Career ==
Three deputy ministers of the Onward Indonesia Cabinet, Sudaryono (center), Thomas Djiwandono (left), and Yuliot Tanjung, (right), gived a press statement after being inaugurated at the State Palace in Jakarta on Thursday, 18 July 2024.

Sudaryono worked as a personal assistant to Prabowo Subianto for five years, from 2009 to 2014. He then began his professional career in 2014 as Corporate Secretary at Nusantara Energy, before being appointed CEO of Garuda TV in 2018. He subsequently served as CEO of PT Nusantara Telematics System from 2019 and as Chairman of PT Sahabat Sejati Sejahtera Farma from 2020. As chairman of the Central Java Regional Leadership Council of the Gerindra, he intended to run as a gubernatorial candidate in the 2024 Central Java gubernatorial election, but withdrew after President Joko Widodo appointed him Deputy Minister of Agriculture of Indonesia.

=== Head of National Nutrition Agency ===
The appointment of Sudaryono as Head of the National Nutrition Agency (BGN) has drawn criticism because he is a Gerindra cadre. The MBG Watch coalition considered his appointment the result of nepotism, arguing that it would not resolve the program's fundamental problems, including conflicts of interest. This has subsequently been reflected in the continued occurrence of mass food-poisoning cases attributed to the Free Nutritious Meals (MBG) program in various regions.

In Papua, hundreds of students suffered food poisoning beginning on 4 August 2026. The Papua Health Agency recorded at least 527 people affected in the poisoning incident in Jayapura. Before the mass food-poisoning incident, they had consumed MBG meals prepared in a kitchen run by a foundation led by the chairman of the Jayapura branch of the Gerindra Party, Edison Awoitauw. In Karo, hundreds of students suffered food poisoning after consuming MBG meals from the Nutrition Provision Service Unit (SPPG) of Kodim 0205/Tanah Karo. The MBG Watch coalition questioned Sudaryono's decision not to take legal action against the SPPG because it is operated by the Indonesian National Armed Forces.

Following the food-poisoning case in Papua, Sudaryono dismissed the head of the Depapre District's Nutrition Provision Service Unit (SPPG). Meanwhile, no legal action has been taken against the MBG supplier foundation owned by a Gerindra cadre, despite Sudaryono acknowledging that procedural violations had caused the mass food poisoning.

During his first month as head of the BGN, mass food-poisoning incidents linked to the MBG program became widespread again, with major cases reported by the media in Jayapura, Semarang, Bogor, Karo, Sidoarjo, Rembang, and Palupuh.

== Personal life ==
Sudaryono recorded a significant increase in his wealth after becoming a minister. According to his State Officials' Wealth Report (LHKPN) report as of 20 January 2025, he had a total net worth of Rp8.86 billion. This amount increased to Rp31 billion in the latest report submitted on 29 March 2026.

== Honors and Awards ==
- Indonesia:
  - Star of Mahaputera Pratama (25 August 2025)
