= SGU =

SGU may refer to:

- Saratov State University, a major higher education and research institution in Russia
- Scottish Golf Union, the governing body for amateur golf in Scotland
- Seinan Gakuin University, a Christian university in Fukuoka, Japan
- The Skeptics' Guide to the Universe, the official podcast of the New England Skeptical Society
- St. George Regional Airport (IATA code: SGU), a public airport located in the city of St. George, serving southern Utah, United States
- St. George's University, an independent international university in Grenada, British West Indies
- Stargate Universe, an American-Canadian military science fiction television series
- Geological Survey of Sweden, Sveriges Geologiska Undersökning
- Swiss German University, university in Greater Jakarta, Indonesia
- Shaoguan railway station, China Railway pinyin code SGU
