= Acceleration of Poverty Reduction Agency =

- Badan Percepatan Pengentasan Kemiskinan
- National emblem of Indonesia

Agency overview
- Formed: 22 October 2024 (announcement); 5 November 2024
- Preceding Agency: National Team for Acceleration of Poverty Reduction
- Jurisdiction: Government of Indonesia
- Agency executives: Budiman Sudjatmiko, Head; Nanik Sudaryati Deyang, Deputy Head I; Irwan Sumule, Deputy Head II
- Parent department: Coordinating Ministry for Social Empowerment
- Website: https://www.tnp2k.go.id/

The Acceleration of Poverty Reduction Agency (Indonesian: Badan Percepatan Pengentasan Kemiskinan, BP2K) is an Indonesian government cabinet-level agency in charge of policy formulation, coordination, harmonization, supervision, control, monitoring, and evaluation of poverty reduction measures. The agency has been led by a head, Budiman Sudjatmiko, since 22 October 2024.

This agency is the elevation of the National Team for Acceleration of Poverty Reduction (Indonesian: Tim Nasional Percepatan Penanggulangan Kemiskinan, TNP2K), which was previously tasked mainly with policy studies and formulation.

== History ==
In 2009, Indonesian poverty was quite high. Around 14.15 % of the Indonesian population was living in poverty. TNP2K was founded by Susilo Bambang Yudhoyono through Presidential Decree No. 15/2010 to provide policies to the president to deal with high poverty. TNP2K was nominally headed by the Vice President. From 2009 to 2014, TNP2K, led by Boediono, succeeded in formulating policies for the President and successfully reducing poverty. At the end of 2014, 11.25 % of the Indonesian population lived in poverty.

During Joko Widodo's administration, TNP2K was retained and was lastly led by Ma'ruf Amin. At the end of his administration, there were 9.03 % of the Indonesian population living in poverty.

When Prabowo ascended to the presidency, he elevated TNP2K to BP2K in the hope of giving more power to the agency to have more impact and role in coordination and actions rather than in only policy making.

== Organization ==
Based on Presidential Decree No. 163/2024, the Acceleration of Poverty Reduction Agency is institutionally independent but reports to the president through the Coordinating Ministry for Social Empowerment. The agency is organized into the following:

- Office of the Head of Acceleration of Poverty Reduction Agency
- Office of the Deputy Head I of Acceleration of Poverty Reduction Agency
- Office of the Deputy Head II of Acceleration of Poverty Reduction Agency
- Agency Secretariat
- Deputy for Acceleration of Welfare Facilities and Welfare Protection (Deputy I)
- Deputy for Acceleration of Capacity Empowerment and Accessibility Provision (Deputy II)
