= Taruna Nusantara =

Taruna Nusantara Senior High School
- Satu Nusa, Satu Bangsa, Satu Bahasa ("One Motherland, One Nation, One Language")
- Magelang Regency, Central Java, Indonesia

Information
- Type: Boarding school
- Established: 1990
- Principal: BGEN Imam Gogor
- Grades: 10-12 (US Equivalent)
- Enrollment: around 375 pupils/year
- Average class size: 32 pupils
- Color: Blue
- Alumni: Ikastara ()
- Website: https://tarunanusantara.sch.id/

Taruna Nusantara Senior High School (also called Tarnus or TN) is a boarding senior high school with a high-rated discipline that is located in Magelang Regency, Central Java, Indonesia. The school gains a reputation from its strong emphasis on national values in addition to exceptional academic and leadership achievements. The school and its teaching method have been referred to as "the inspiration for the setting up of other top schools in Indonesia."

Taruna Nusantara can be translated as "Patriot of The Archipelago." The word Taruna itself also generally refers to Indonesia's military cadet, which has no direct relation to and should not be confused with the school and its students.

== History ==
The idea for the school was made by then-Indonesian Minister of Defence and Security, Gen. Leonardus Benjamin Moerdani in 1985. He envisioned a civilian school that could educate the country's best talents and produce graduates who could continue carrying forward the national mission set by the nation's founding fathers. It was then followed by the signing of MoU by Indonesian Armed Forces and Taman Siswa, which is among the first local and formal educational groups in Indonesia, to set up and support a foundation called Lembaga Perguruan Taman Taruna Nusantara (LPTTN). It is this foundation that eventually crystallised Gen. Moerdani's vision and subsequently oversaw the operational process of the school.

The school was unveiled by the then-Commander of Armed Forces, Gen. Try Sutrisno in 1990. The whole campus, consisting of the school compound, students' dormitories, and teachers' housing complex, occupied an 18.5 ha site, donated by the neighboring Indonesian Military Academy. During the first six years, the school admitted 245 male students every year. Starting from 1996, it became a co-ed school by accepting the first batch of 70 female students, and to accommodate this change, the school area was expanded to 23 hectares.

To be able to attract outstanding teenagers, the school, backed by the politically and financially strong Armed Forces, offered full scholarships to all students. Its teachers also enjoyed above-average salaries and facilities. However, after the severe Asian currency crisis in 1997 and the change in the national political landscape thereafter, the school faced financial difficulties and withdrew its scholarship scheme in 2002 or when accepting its thirteenth batch of students. To date, some needy students still receive the scholarship, which is sponsored by private corporations, state's departments, local and regional governments, or its alumni.

== Features ==
Although the school is sometimes referred to as having military-like discipline, it is not in any way similar to the military. The school curriculum is no different from the national education curriculum; all students receive the same education as others at senior high schools in Indonesia, with additional courses and activities being specifically added to develop nationalism and leadership among the students as emphasized by the founder's original goal.

Contrary to many public opinions, students who graduated from the school do not have any obligation to attend the military academy and may choose to continue their higher education freely.

=== Selection process ===
The school screening process for applicants includes academic, physical, and psychological tests, health checks, and interviews.

=== Curriculum ===
In delivering its lessons and developing its pupils, the school focuses on three aspects: nationalism, patriotism, and national culture. These aspects are reflected in its curriculum: besides studying based on the compulsory national curricula, the students must take special subjects that are not taught elsewhere to people of their age, namely Leadership, Nationalism, and National Defence.

=== Leadership development programs ===
To prepare its students to become leaders in their respective fields and contribute back to society, the school provides leadership opportunities through a combination of both theoretical concepts and practical application of leadership principles. The school runs classroom lectures on leadership theories, organizational behavior, and public speaking, just to name a few.

To make sure that leadership opportunities are available to every student, and not only the selected few, the school has a rotation program, where all students are alternatingly assigned to a class and/or dorm leader position for one week.

=== Other activities ===
- Basic education of discipline and leadership. All pupils of freshman year join this basic education process, which may consist of nationalism education and basic military training. During this period, they are not allowed to make any contact with outside parties, including their own families, the purpose being to strengthen their independence and self-confidence.
- Journey of Gen. Sudirman. One of the field activities of the students is to take part in a journey on foot to jungles and mountains, simulating a guerrilla war led by General Sudirman, a famous military leader during the Indonesian National Revolution. The journey follows a 15 km (about 9.4 miles) route and takes in one day.
- Camps and social works. Students have camps and social work to attend. In many cases, the camps require them to stay in the wilderness under minimal supervision, a method believed to cultivate their sense of survival.

=== Extracurricular activities ===
Extracurricular activities available at Taruna Nusantara include the Student Board Organization (Organisasi Siswa Intra Sekolah / OSIS), Student Representatives (Majelis Perwakilan Kelas / MPK), Ceremonial Platoon (Peleton Upacara / Tonpara), School Security Patrol (Patroli Keamanan Sekolah / PKS), Color Guard Section (Pasukan Tanda Kehormatan / Pataka), Gita Bahana Nusantara Marching Band (GBNMB), First Aid Club, Debating Society, Sports Team (Soccer, Tennis, Volley, Swimming, Athletic), Arts and Performances (Gamelan, Rampak Gendang and Band).

=== Study Team ===
Students of SMA Taruna Nusantara are known for their top achievements in academic competitions, for instance, science olympiads (KSN, OSN, and international olympiads), debate competitions, etc. Extracurricular teams that provide a place for students to upskill themselves in those academic proficiencies are:

- Aeromodeling (Aeromodeling team)
- Prasasti (School Magazine Team)
- KIRTARA (KIR SMA Taruna Nusantara, Student Science Club)
- Fractura (Photography team)
- Tomat (Mathematics Olympiad Team)
- Elephyte (Electromen and Physics Team)
- Cesium (Chemistry Squad with Incredible and Unbeatable Members)
- BioHolic (Biology Team)
- TNCC (Taruna Nusantara Computer Club)
- Astrogank (Astronomy Olympiad Team)
- TNEC (Taruna Nusantara Economy Club)
- Granity (Geology and Geography Taruna Nusantara Community)
- Hiperbola (Indonesian Language Team)
- TNESC (Taruna Nusantara English Speaking Club)
- TNT (Taruna Nusantara Ni Hon Go Team)
- Deutsch Club (German Language Club)
- TNRC (Taruna Nusantara Robotic Club)
- Konsisten (Civic Education Team)

=== Principality ===
Another feature of the school is the qualification of its principals who, before the time of incumbency, were high-ranking military officers, with the exception of the first principal, who previously was a rector in a local university.

The principals:

- Prof Dr Tarwotjo Tjitrosoedjono; M.Sc. (1990–1994)
- MajGen Bambang Hartoyo; M.B.A. (1994)
- BGen drs Sadja Moeljoredjo (1994–1998)
- BGen Bambang Pradjuritno; L.L.B. (1998–2004)
- BGen (Ret) drs Untung Susoro (2005–2006)
- BGen (Ret) Djuwari Sarmyanto M.Sc. (2006–2010)
- Cdre (Ret) Djoko Sasongko (2010-2011)
- BGen (Ret) Bambang Sumaryanto, S.E., M.M. (2011-2013)
- BGen (Ret) Wahid Hidayat, S.I.P. (2013-2015)
- BGen (Ret) Adi Widjaja, M.Sc. (2015-2016)
- Drs. Usdiyanto, M.Hum (2016-2018)
- BGen (Ret) Soebagio, S.I.P. (2018-2019)
- Maj. Gen. (Ret) Suhartono Suratman (2019-2024)
- BGen Imam Gogor Agnie Aditya (2025-present)

=== Best Graduates ===
Top graduates of the school are awarded the 'Garuda Trisakti Taruna Tama' Medal, which has three classes: gold, silver, and bronze. Awardees are selected based on their academic accomplishments, leadership competence, personality, character, and physical fitness.

=== Notable alumni ===
Taruna Nusantara High School graduates do not always pursue a career in the military. Many choose to become entrepreneurs, academics, scientists, or enter the world of politics.

A number of graduates have held strategic positions in government agencies, even serving as ministers in the Red White Cabinet.

Some notable alumni:

- Kristomei Sianturi (TN 2), Indonesian Army general
- Agus Harimurti Yudhoyono (TN 5), Coordinating Minister for Infrastructure and Regional Development
- Sugiono (TN 5), Minister of Foreign Affairs
- Prasetyo Hadi (TN 6), Minister of the State Secretariat
- Sudaryono (TN 11), Head of National Nutrition Agency and former Deputy Minister of Agriculture.
- Teddy Indra Wijaya (TN 15), Cabinet Secretary of Indonesia
- Aditya Halindra Faridzky (TN 18), Regent of Tuban
