= Bernd Luz =

German painter

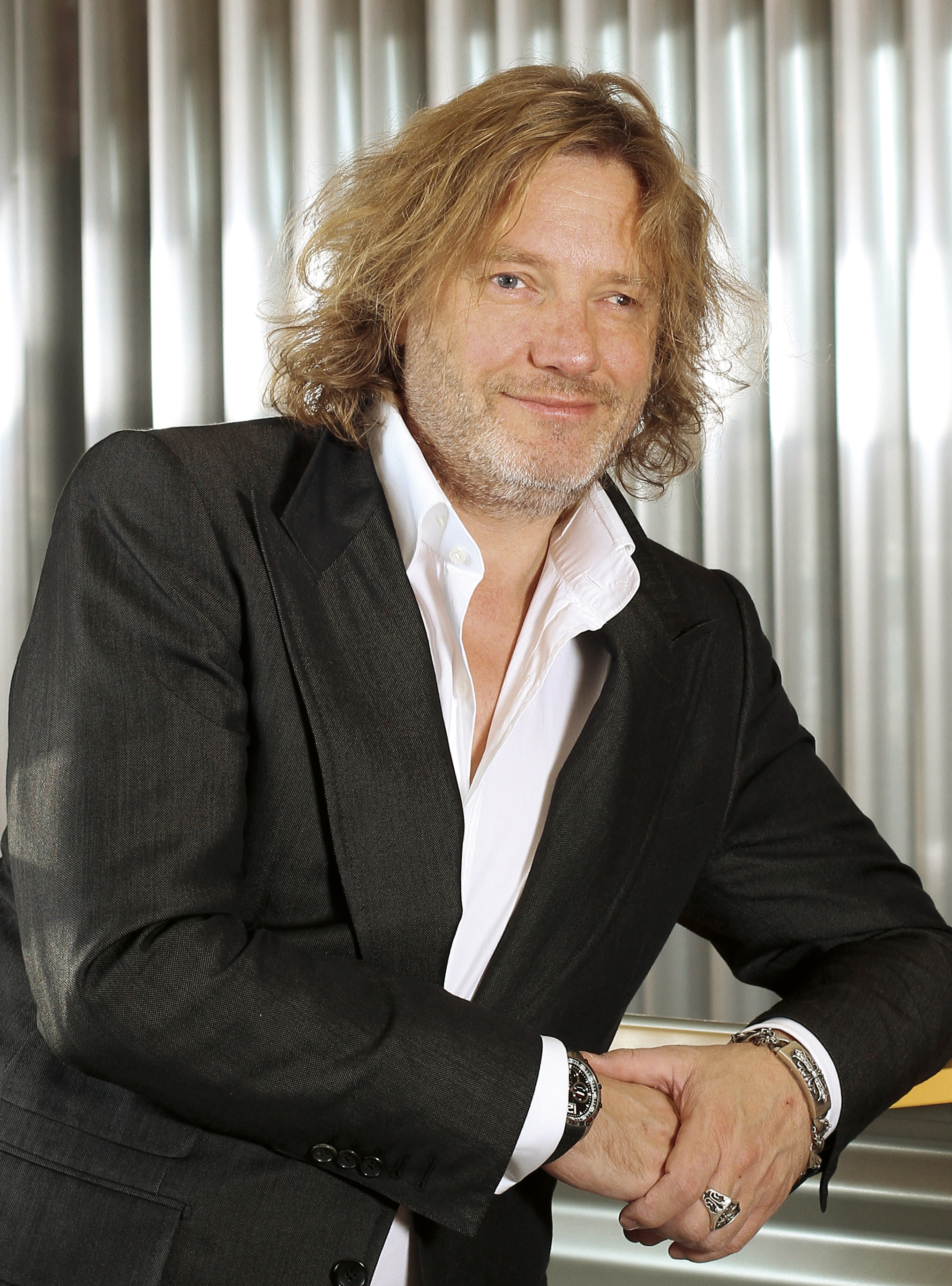
Bernd Luz 2014

Bernd Luz (born May 20, 1966) is a contemporary German visual artist and communication designer. His work bridges the divide between independent art and commissioned work, the abstract and objective.

== Life ==
Luz was born on May 20, 1966 in Rottweil. He began his artistic activities at an early age, with recognition of his talent including first award at the Swiss Youth Film Festival (Schweizer Jugendfilmtage) in 1986. He initially studied photo design for a year in a private art school in Ravensburg and completed an apprenticeship as an industrial mechanic with an emphasis on surgical technology. He studied art in communication design at the FH Konstanz technical university (currently the Hochschule Konstanz University of Applied Sciences), graduating in 1993 as a designer. This was followed by the establishment of an independent company, Design Studio revoLUZion, in Neuhausen ob Eck in the district of Tuttlingen, Germany. He has operated a second studio since 2003 in Zürich, and later in Schaffhausen, Switzerland. Several of his signets and creations can be found in international design books. He has intensified his dedication since 2013 to the Abstract Pop artistic genre which he himself named, a style which combines abstract images and pop art, gaining an international reputation as a result. In 2021, Luz was appointed to the Advisory Board of the New York Auto Museum.

== Work ==
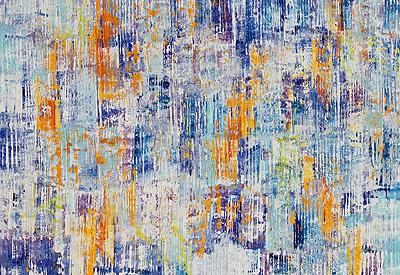
Abstract work, acrylic technique on canvas

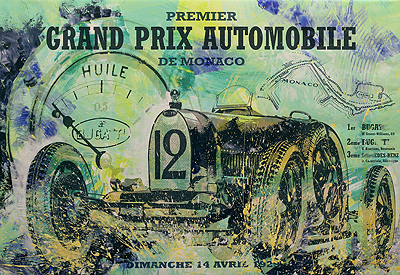
Abstract Pop work, media mix on canvas

Luz's creations mainly involve media mix works peppered with image citations dedicated to a variety of complex issues. The depiction reflects the collage principle in terms of the isolation and rearrangement of elements. The staging of different details and glimpses to indicate complex correlations is achieved in a manner which invites the viewer to explore entire stories across the surface of the image. "I depict the things that move me", stated Bernd Luz, an approach which ensures he avoids being labelled in any fixed categories.

A new facet of this artist's work sees the colour which played a supporting role in the media mix taking centre stage. Dispensing with any objective allusions and figure, Luz surrenders himself and the surface of his image to the interplay between colour, structure and light. Instead of the rigidly interwoven motif of collages, a purely illusionistic colour space is created here, usually dominated by a leading tone. Rather than being conceptual in nature, the procedure adopted is guided by mood and atmosphere and, instead of a decipherable portrayal of reality, the reality of the image is reflected in a painted form. One focus of his art lies in the integration and realisation of themes drawn from the world of automobiles. These artworks relate to historic events and vehicles in motor racing, a reflection of the past, depicted with contemporary expression and vision. These works are exhibited in numerous different automobile museums.

== List of most significant exhibitions ==
=== Temporary exhibitions ===
- 2. October 2014: German Embassy in Astana, Kazakhstan
- 25. June −9. July 2014: Has Sanat Gallery Astana, Kazakhstan
- June, July and October 2013: National Museum of Kazakhstan and the German Consulate General, Almaty, Kazakhstan
- 28. March 2014: Auction to benefit the Centre for Rare Diseases at the University Hospital Tübingen, Germany
- 29. March to 13. August 2017: Bernd Luz - Legends of Le Mans, Automuseum Volkswagen Wolfsburg, Germany

=== Permanent exhibitions ===
- Since December 2014: Motorworld Region Stuttgart, Böblingen
- Since 2014: Permanent exhibition at the Nürburgring, Germany
- Since April 2014: Permanent exhibition, Autosammlung Steim, Black Forest, Germany
- Since June 2011: Permanent exhibition at the Cité de l'Automobile National Museum, Mulhouse, France
