= Kristomei Sianturi =

Indonesian army general

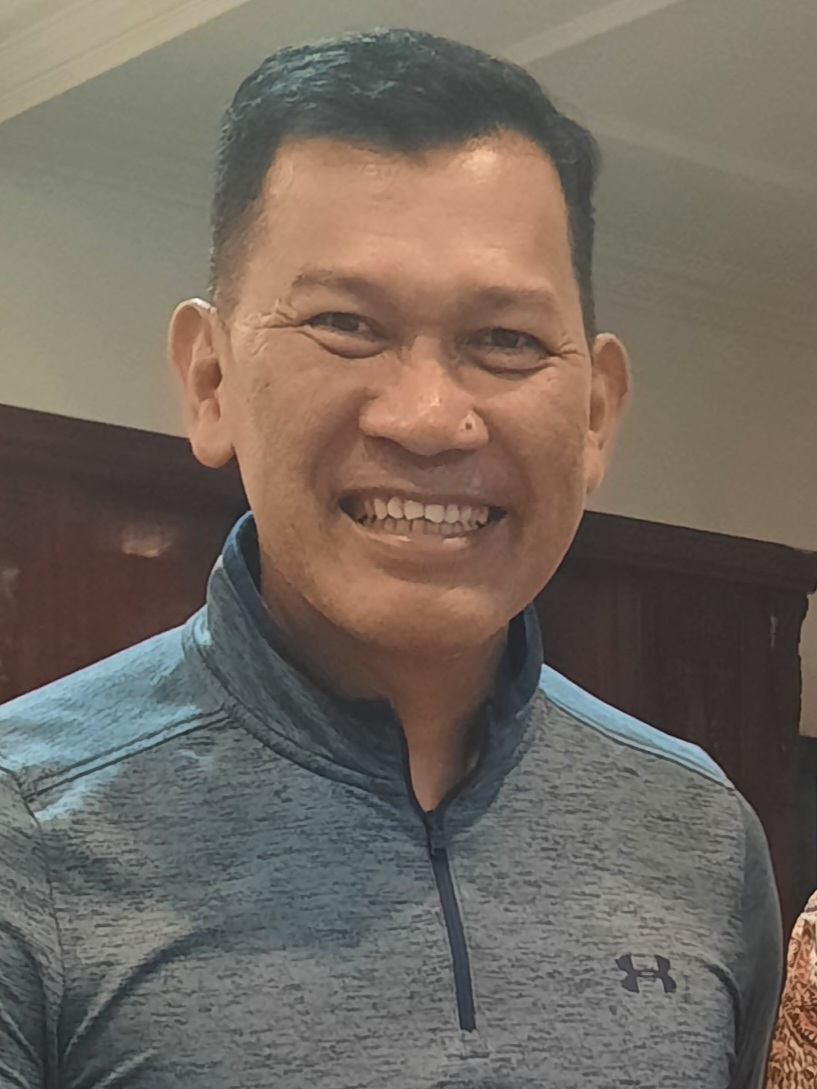
- Born: May 6, 1976 (age 50); Kotabumi, North Lampung, Lampung, Indonesia
- Military career
- Branch: Indonesian Army
- Service years: 1997–present
- Rank: Lieutenant general
- Service number: 11970043750576
- Unit: Infantry
- Commands: Radin Inten Regional Military Command; 328th Airborne Infantry Battalion; 305th Airborne Infantry Battalion; Tanggamus Military District

Chief of the National Agency for Disaster Countermeasure
- Incumbent
- Assumed office 15 October 2026
- Preceded by: Suharyanto

Kristomei Sianturi (born 6 May 1976) is an Indonesian army lieutenant general who is the chief of the National Agency for Disaster Countermeasure since 15 October 2026. Prior to his appointment, he had been assigned to different military units in the Army Strategic Reserve Command and army territorial units, including as spokesperson of the armed forces and the commander of the Radin Inten (Lampung) Regional Military Command.

== Early life and education ==
Kristomei Sianturi was born on 6 May 1976 in Kotabumi, North Lampung. Upon completing primary and secondary education in his hometown, Kristomei wanted to move to Bandung 3rd State High School to take the state college examination for the Bandung Institute of Technology easily. However, he changed after finding out about the Taruna Nusantara, a semi-military boarding school in Magelang, Central Java, which has no tuition. He entered Taruna Nusantara and graduated in 1994.

Upon completing high school, Kristomei took the state college examination for the Diponegoro University. Around the same time, he took physical tests for the Indonesian Military Academy and applied to the Indonesian State College of Accountancy and Telkom Institute for Informatics. He was accepted to the Indonesian Military Academy before knowing that he was accepted in all of the university he applied. He was initially reluctant to enter the academy, but decided to go forward after knowing that he would be required to pay back all of his education if he withdrew. He completed his military education three years later and became a second lieutenant on 18 December 1997.

Kristomei holds a degree in defense management from the Indonesian Defense University in 2012 and is currently pursuing a doctorate in defense management from the same university.

== Career ==
=== Assignment in Aceh ===
Kristomei began his career in the Army Strategic Reserve Command and was sent to Aceh, which at that time was declared as a military operation region due to the activity of insurgents. He completed his duty in Aceh in 2003 and was sent to the United States to study intelligence for seven months. Upon returning from Indonesia, Kristomei planned to get married, but delayed the plan as he was sent back to Aceh to command troops for the Indonesian offensive. He and his troops were withdrawn following the signing of the Helsinki peace agreement on 15 August 2005, which ended the conflict. He got married shortly after his withdrawal.

=== Battalion and military district command ===
Kristomei reached the rank of captain and was assigned to the 328th Airborne Infantry Battalion as deputy commander in 2010. After two years of service, he was sent to attend the Indonesian Army Command and General Staff College in 2012. He received an award for the best military paper. He was briefly assigned as an assistant officer for operations in the Army Strategic Reserve Command before being appointed as the commander of the 305th Airborne Infantry Division in Karawang. Aside from his duty as battalion commander, Kristomei was also involved in writing Indonesia's Ministry of Defense 2014 white paper.

During his command, an incident occurred in which several soldiers from the battalion clashed with the Karawang police. The incident stemmed from a misunderstanding between a member of the battalion, who was accompanying his wife to work in the Karawang city council, with a police member from the Mobile Brigade Corps who was guarding a labor protest near the city council building. Kristomei later visited two police members who were wounded due to the incident and provided financial assistance for their treatment. Kristomei publicly apologized on behalf of the battalion and stated that the battalion was instructed to repair the police guard posts destroyed during the clash.

After serving in the battalion, in 2014 Kristomei was sent to his home province, Lampung, where he commanded the Tanggamus Military District. Under Kristomei, the military district set agriculture self-sufficiency for Tanggamus as one of its main goals and cooperated with the local government to provide locals with agriculture training. He ended his assignment in Tanggamus on 22 April 2016 and returned to the Army Strategic Reserve Command as the deputy assistant for operations. Less than a year after that, he became the personal secretary to the deputy army chief of staff, Hinsa Siburian. Hinsa retired several months after holding the position and Kristomei was replaced as private secretary by Hinsa's successor.

=== Assignment in regional military commands ===
Kristomei then became the information chief (spokesperson) of the Jayakarta (Jakarta) Regional Military Command on 12 September 2017. Shortly after his appointment, Kristomei gathered web admins of the military units in the Jakarta Regional Military Command and instructing them to "increase the quality of publications". Kristomei was promoted to the rank of colonel on 1 April 2018. He also briefly attended a course on joint military operation, which he completed with the distinction as best graduate. He handed over his position as information chief on 2 August 2019 and underwent advanced military education at the Indonesian Armed Forces Staff and Command School.

Kristomei was sent to North Sumatra after his education and became the assistant for operations in the Bukit Barisan Regional Military Command on 29 June 2020. At the time of his appointment, the government's effort to handle COVID-19 pandemic was in full swing. Kristomei was instructed by the assistant for operations to the army chief of staff, Major-General Surawahadi, to establish a COVID-19 response team for the Bukit Barisan Regional Military Command.

Aside from his duty as assistant for operations, Kristomei was then appointed as a member of the public communication team of the COVID-19 Response Acceleration Task Force. Kristomei was noted to host several talkshows by the COVID-19 Response Acceleration Task Force to educate the public regarding the government's policy on the COVID-19 pandemic. During this period, he spent a few nights residing at the task force's headquarters in the National Agency for Disaster Countermeasure building and worked closely with the agency's chief Doni Monardo.

After serving as assistant for operations, Kristomei was transferred to the Iskandar Muda Regional Military Command in Aceh as the commander of the main regiment on 3 February 2022. He was replaced as commander of the main regiment on 23 December. He was reposted to the army headquarter as assistant officer for domestic military operations in the army headquarters operational staff.

=== Spokesperson and military academy ===
On 7 October 2023, the Commander of the Indonesian National Armed Forces Yudo Margono issued a decree which appointed Kristomei as the Chief of the Army Information Services, a position commonly known as the army spokesperson. He replaced Hamim Tohari, who became the expert staff for environment to the army chief of staff. Kristomei was promoted to brigadier general on 26 October and was officially installed for the position five days later. He handed over his position on 20 August 2024.

After serving as spokesperson, Kristomei was assigned to the Indonesian Military Academy. He was the commander of the military academy's cadet regiment from 30 August to December 2024. On 6 December 2024, he was appointed as the deputy governor of the military academy. He briefly assumed this position for three months from 8 January 2025 before being appointed to the two-star position of the chief of the armed forces information service (spokesperson) on 14 March 2025. He was installed as spokesperson six days later and became a major general on 8 May.

=== Commander of the Radin Inten Regional Military Command ===
Kristomei (wearing army field hat) standing among villagers of the New Raharja Village, 2026.

On 6 August 2025, Kristomei was appointed to command the newly formed 21st Radin Inten Regional Military Command, covering the Lampung and Bengkulu province. He was installed four days later in a military ceremony by President Prabowo Subianto. He frequently engaged in dialogues with student protesters as well as leaders of student executive bodies and media executives through routine dialogue and outreach program under the label of Radin Inten Welcomes (Radin Inten Menyapa). He also opened a hotline number service to report misbehaviours by servicemen, as well as the artificial intelligence-based Centurion 21 app to strengthen relations between village trustee NCOs (Babinsa, Bintara Pembina Desa) and the rural populace.

=== Head of the National Agency for Disaster Countermeasure ===
On 15 October 2026, Kristomei was installed as the head of National Agency for Disaster Countermeasure following a mass arrest of officials within the agency, including the younger brother of the previous agency chief, Suharyanto, by the Corruption Eradication Commission. Kristomei was promoted to the rank of lieutenant general shortly before his inauguration ceremony. At 50, he was the youngest military personnel to be appointed to the post. Kristomei pledged to conduct an internal cleanup and not to intervene the ongoing legal case on the arrested officials, as well as resolving the ongoing haze crisis as soon as possible through an integrated approach by collaborating with other agencies. In response to the claim made by Suharyanto that the forest fire causing the haze has been reduced to 639 hectares, Kristomei stated he would re-evaluate the actual area through NASA's satellite maps and the forest ministry's SiPongi digital early warning system.

== Personal life ==
Kristomei is married to Dezi Asti Megasari, a former journalist and reporter for the Liputan 6 news program on 15 September 2005. The couple has three daughters.
