= Nanik Sudaryati Deyang =

Indonesian journalist

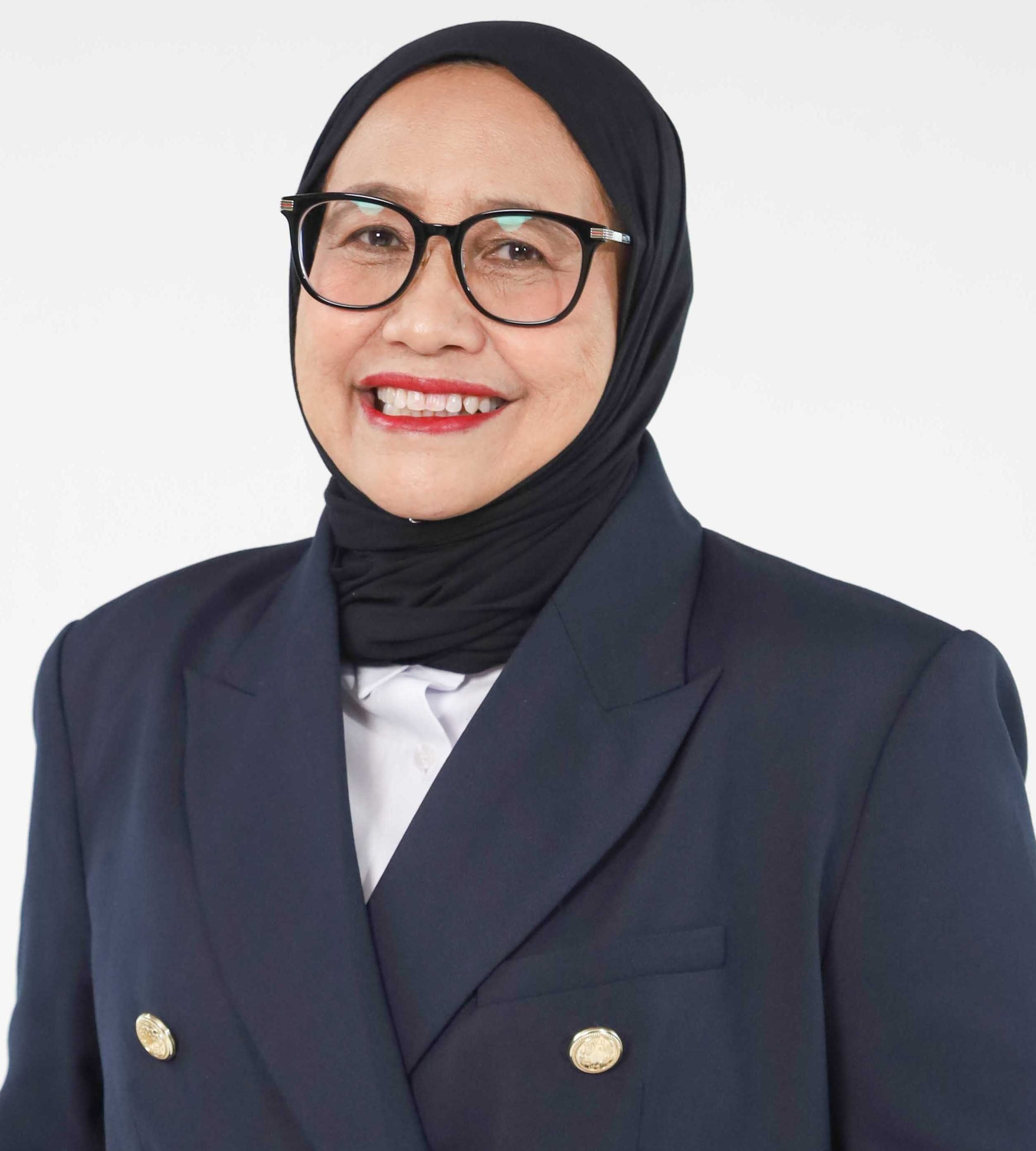

Head of the National Nutrition Agency
- In office 8 June 2026 – 22 July 2026
- President: Prabowo Subianto
- Lieutenant: Agustina Arumsari; Trenggono
- Succeeded by: Sudaryono

Deputy Head of the National Nutrition Agency
- In office 17 September 2025 – 2 June 2026
- Head: Dadan Hindayana
- Preceded by: Lodewyk Pusung
- Succeeded by: Agustina Arumsari; Trenggono

Deputy Head of the Poverty Alleviation Acceleration Agency
- In office 22 October 2024 – 17 September 2025
- President: Prabowo Subianto
- Head: Budiman Sudjatmiko

Personal details
- Born: Nanik Sudaryati Deyang; January 3, 1968 (age 58) Dagangan, Madiun, Indonesia
- Education: Jenderal Soedirman University
- Occupation: Politician, journalist

Nanik Sudaryati Deyang or Nanik S. Deyang (born January 3, 1968) is an Indonesian politician born in Dagangan, Madiun, Indonesia. Initially, he had a career as a journalist for "Tabloid Bangkit" and was part of Prabowo's successful team. 2019 Indonesian presidential election.

After Prabowo was elected in 2024 Indonesian presidential election, He was appointed as Deputy Head I of the Agency for the Acceleration of Poverty Alleviation for the 2024-2029 period. On June 12, 2025, he was appointed as Independent Commissioner Pertamina. On September 17, 2025, he was appointed Deputy Head of the National Nutrition Agency (BGN), while simultaneously dismissing him from his position as Deputy I of the Agency for the Acceleration of Poverty Alleviation.

On June 2, 2026, he was appointed as Head of the National Nutrition Agency replacing Dadan Hindayana. On July 22, 2026, Nanik announced her resignation as Head of National Nutrition Agency (BGN) due to health reasons, she would undergo treatment for heart disease abroad.

== Education ==
Nanik Sudaryati Deyang is an alumnus of the Faculty of Biology at Jendral Soedirman University Class of 1983.

== Carrier ==
=== Deputy Head I of the Agency for the Acceleration of Poverty Alleviation (2024–2025) ===
Following Prabowo Subianto's victory in the 2024 Indonesian Presidential Election, Nanik began to enter the central government bureaucracy. In October 2024, she was officially appointed by President Prabowo Subianto as Deputy Head I of the Agency for the Acceleration of Poverty Alleviation for the 2024–2029 term. At this non-ministerial agency, she was tasked with assisting Budiman Sudjatmiko in formulating strategic programs for the social safety net and addressing extreme poverty in Indonesia.

=== Deputy Head of the National Nutrition Agency (2025–2026) ===
The dynamics of his bureaucratic duties continued when, on September 17, 2025, President Prabowo Subianto inaugurated him as Deputy Head of the National Nutrition Agency at the State Palace. Along with this inauguration, he was honorably dismissed from his previous position at the Agency for the Acceleration of Poverty Alleviation to focus on national nutrition adequacy. Within this agency, he was specifically entrusted with leading the assignment as Deputy Head of the BGN for Public Communication and Investigation. During this position, he actively conducted field monitoring, budget efficiency evaluations, and even closed nutrition service kitchen units deemed not meeting eligibility standards.

=== Commissioner of PT Pertamina (Persero) (2025–present) ===
On June 12, 2025, Nanik's executive career expanded into the state-owned corporation sector. The Ministry of State-Owned Enterprises (BUMN) appointed her to the position of Commissioner at the national oil and gas company, PT Pertamina (Persero). This position was entrusted to him in order to strengthen the function of monitoring corporate compliance and good corporate governance.

=== Head of the National Nutrition Agency (2026) ===
Based on the official announcement from Minister of State Secretary Prasetyo Hadi on June 2, 2026, President Prabowo Subianto appointed Nanik Sudaryati Deyang as the new Head of the National Nutrition Agency, replacing Dadan Hindayana. Through this appointment, she holds full authority to lead the implementation of the national strategic program Free Nutritious Meals (MBG) throughout Indonesia. In carrying out her new duties, she is accompanied by two newly appointed deputy heads: Agustina Arumsari and Major General TNI Trenggono. Nanik announced her resignation as Head of National Nutrition Agency(BGN) on July 22, 2026.

== Controversy ==
Nanik was involved in spreading the Ratna Sarumpaet hoax in 2018, telling the news to presidential candidate Prabowo Subianto before it was revealed that the news of the assault was a lie.

Nanik S. Deyang has officially submitted her resignation from her position as Head of the National Nutrition Agency (BGN), citing her desire to focus on healthcare. This decision is controversial, as it comes amidst a leadership transition at the agency, which has received widespread attention from both national and international media.
