= Aditya Halindra Faridzky =

Indonesian Javanese politician

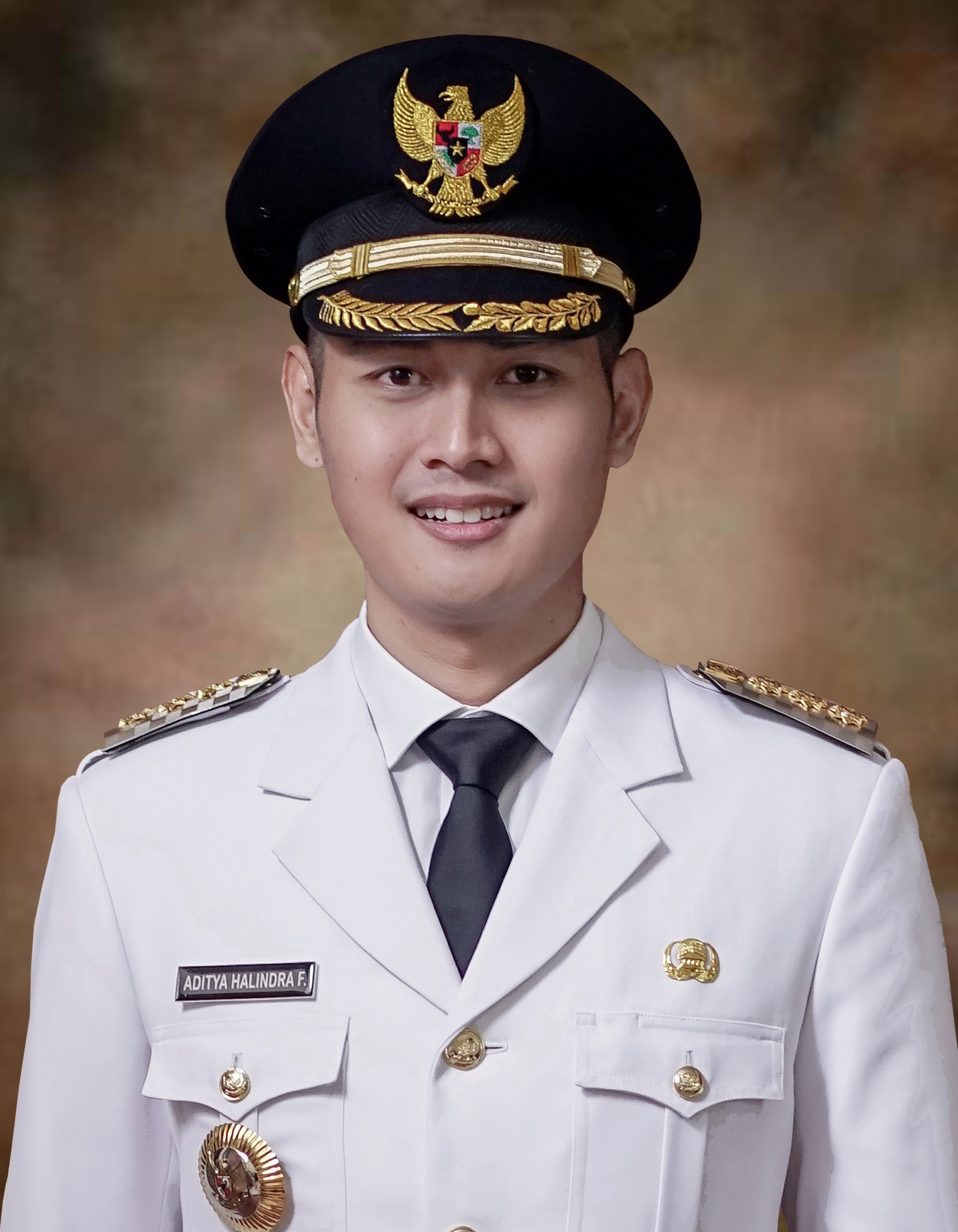

Regent of Tuban
- Incumbent
- Assumed office 20 June 2021
- Governor: Khofifah Indar Parawansa
- Deputy: Riyadi
- Preceded by: Fathul Huda

Member of the East Java Regional People's Representative Council
- In office 31 August 2019 – 23 September 2020
- Governor: Khofifah Indar Parawansa
- Constituency: East Java 12

Personal details
- Born: April 15, 1992 (age 34) Surabaya, East Java, Indonesia
- Party: Golkar

Aditya Halindra Faridzky (born 15 April 1992) is an Indonesian Javanese politician who became a member of the East Java Regional People's Representative Council from 2019 until 2020. He was elected as the Regent of Tuban in the 2020 Tuban regent election.

== Early life and education ==
Aditya was born on 15 April 1992 in Surabaya, East Java to Ali Hasan and Haeny Relawati Rini Widyastuti. His mother, Haeny Relawati Rini Widyastuti, was a Golkar politician who became the Regent of Tuban from 2001 until 2011, while his father, Ali Hasan, was an entrepreneur and a Golkar politician. The third of four children in a Muslim family, he has two sisters named Aulia Hany Mustikasari and Adela Hanindya Nastiti, and a brother named Aldwin Hafid Harsandi.

Aditya began his studies at the Kebonsari State Elementary School No. 2 from 1998 until 2004. Aditya then continued his studies at the State High School No. 1 from 2004 until 2007, and the Taruna Nusantara High School — a semi-military boarding school — from 2007 until 2010.

After he graduated from high school, Aditya enrolled at the economics faculty in the Gadjah Mada University in 2010. However, in the midst of his second semester in the university, his father, Ali Hasan, died on 5 April 2011. Subsequently, he was given the duty of handling and organizing the family's business. Due to concerns about distance from the university to the family businesses in Tuban, he decided to move to Airlangga University in Surabaya. He graduated from the Airlangga University in 2014.

== Political career ==
=== In the Golkar party ===
Aditya began his tenure his politics since 2011. Aditya became member of Golkar party's youth wing. He became the chairman of the Tuban branch of the party's youth wing in 2013 and as the deputy chairman of the Golkar party in Tuban. Aditya was unanimously elected as the chairman of the Golkar party in Tuban in May 2016 for a five-year term.

=== Regional legislator ===
Aditya ran as a candidate for the East Java Regional House of Representatives in the 2019 Indonesian general election. Aditya contested in the elections as a candidate from the Golkar party, representing the 12th East Java electoral district, which covers Bojonegoro and Tuban. Aditya obtained 66,562 votes in the election and won a seat in the council, making him the youngest member of the council.

Aditya, along with 119 other members of the council, was inaugurated on 31 August 2019. Aditya was seated in the commission B of the council, which handles economy, industry and trade, agriculture, fishery, livestock, plantation, forestry, food procurement and logistics, cooperatives, small and medium entrepreneurs, tourism, creative economy, and management of regional marine area potential. He also became the member of the deliberations body of the council.

On 1 September 2020, following his plans to run in the 2020 Tuban regent election, Aditya send a letter to the council, stating his plans to resign from the council. Aditya officially resigned on 23 September 2020 after he was officially declared eligible to run in the election. Aditya's seat remained vacant until 16 November 2020, when Freddy Poernomo was inaugurated and officially replaced him.

== Regent of Tuban ==
=== Elections ===
Since he became a member of the East Java Regional People's Representative Council, Aditya has planned to run in the 2020 Tuban regent election. In an interview with Warta Transparan on 31 August 2019, Aditya stated that he has communicated with public figures in Tuban regarding his candidacy. Aside from his party Golkar, Aditya was endorsed by the Democratic Party, which announced their support on 5 August 2020, and by the Prosperous Justice Party, which announced their support on 26 August 2020. Aditya chose Riyadi, a politician from the Democratic Party, as his running mate.

Aditya and Riyadi registered themselves as a candidate on 6 September 2020. On 23 September 2020, the Tuban General Elections Commission announced three eligible candidates for the election. Ballot number was assigned the next day with Aditya as candidate number 2.

Elections were held on 9 December 2020 on the same day as other elections during the 2020 Indonesian local elections. Vandiko campaign team deployed witnesses to the individual polling stations across the regency. Aditya himself voted in the Perbon subdistrict along with his mother and sister. Following the voting, immediate quick count results favored Aditya's victory. Official results were announced by the General Elections Commission on 15 December 2020, with Aditya obtaining 423,212 votes or 60 percent of the total votes. Aditya was declared as the winner of the election. He was reelected for a second term in 2024, securing 528,942 votes (83.9%).
