= Neuhausen ob Eck =

- Municipality
- Coat of arms

- Location of Neuhausen ob Eck within Tuttlingen district
- Interactive map of Neuhausen ob Eck
- Location within Germany Location within Baden-Württemberg
- Coordinates: 47°58′16″N 08°55′47″E
- Country: Germany
- State: Baden-Württemberg
- Admin. region: Freiburg
- District: Tuttlingen

Government
  - Mayor (2020–28): Marina Jung

Area
  - Total: 46.25 km^{2} (17.86 sq mi)
- Elevation: 768 m (2,520 ft)

Population (2025-12-31)
  - Total: 4,093
  - Density: 88.50/km^{2} (229.2/sq mi)
- Time zone: UTC+01:00 (CET)
  - Summer (DST): UTC+02:00 (CEST)
- Postal codes: 78579
- Dialling codes: 07467; 07777
- Vehicle registration: TUT
- Website: www.neuhausen-ob-eck.de

Neuhausen ob Eck is a municipality in the district of Tuttlingen in Baden-Württemberg in Germany.

== Demographics ==
Population development:

Year	Inhabitants
1990	3,295
2001	3,724
2011	3,845
2021	3,840

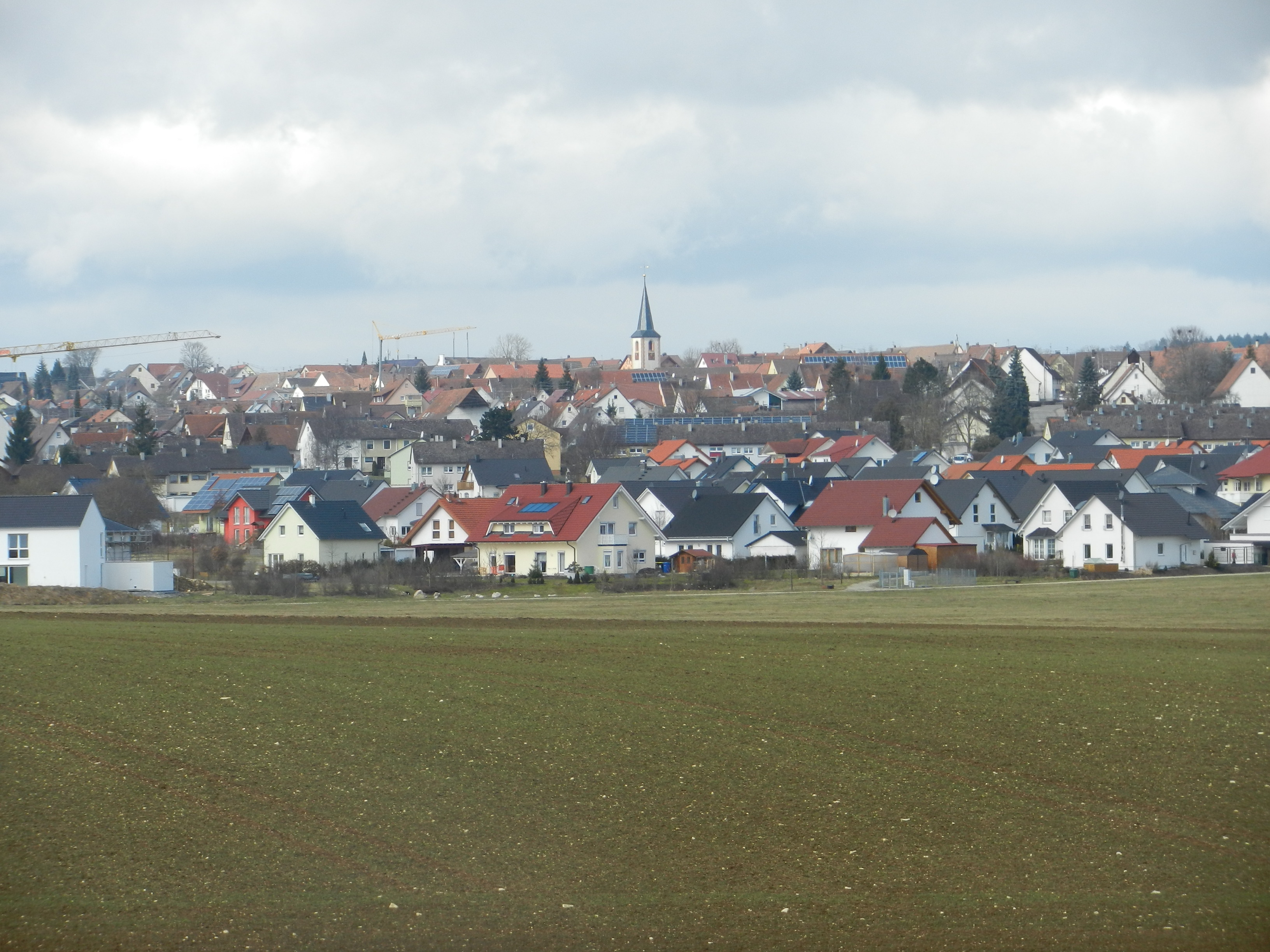
Neuhausen ob Eck

== Notable residents ==
- Bernd Luz, German contemporary visual artist.
