= Hamim Tohari =

Indonesian military officer

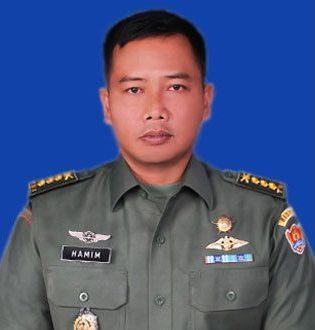
- Born: 22 July 1971 (age 55); Trenggalek, East Java, Indonesia
- Military career
- Allegiance: Indonesia
- Branch: Army
- Service years: 1994—present
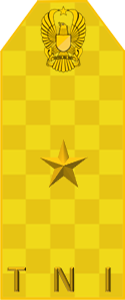
- Rank: Brigadier general
- Unit: Air Defense

Hamim Tohari is a military officer from the Indonesian Army. He is currently the chief of expert staffs to the Commander of the Army Strategic Reserve Command. He served in the position since 19 April 2024. Previously, he was assigned to different military units, including as the Chief of the Army Information Services.

== Early life ==
Hamim was born on 22 July 1971 in Trenggalek. Hamim studied at the maths and natural sciences faculty of the Brawijaya University from 1989, but dropped out in 1991 to pursue a career in the military. He then entered the Indonesian Military Academy and graduated from there in 1994. He also pursued further military education at the Indonesian Army Command and General Staff College in 2011 and the Indonesian Armed Forces Command and General Staff College in 2018.

== Military career ==
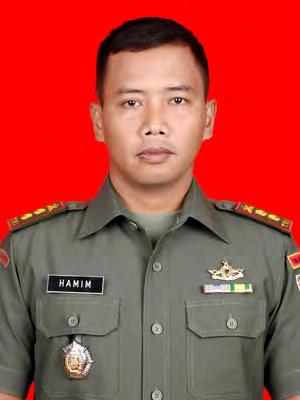
Portrait of Hamim Tohari as the commander of the East Jakarta Military District.

After graduating from the Indonesian Military Academy, Hamim was posted as a platoon commander in the 3rd Air Defense Artillery Battalion. He was then transferred to the Special Forces Command after undergoing commando training and served in the command's operational staff. He later returned to the 3rd Air Defense Artillery Battalion as a junior officer after several years in the Special Forces Command. He was then ordered to attend a battery commander preparation course for several months in 2000 before serving as a battery commander in the battalion. He was moved to head the battalion's operational section for a few months.

Following his service in the battalion, Hamim was moved to the army artillery center, where he was entrusted to lead the air defense research and development section. During this period, he also briefly headed the intelligence section of an air defense regiment. He was later transferred to Jakarta, where he became the commander of a guided missile detachment stationed there. He returned to the army air defense center several years later and held several administrative offices until 2010. He attended a battalion commander preparation course that year and became the commander of the 1st Air Defense Battalion in Tangerang.

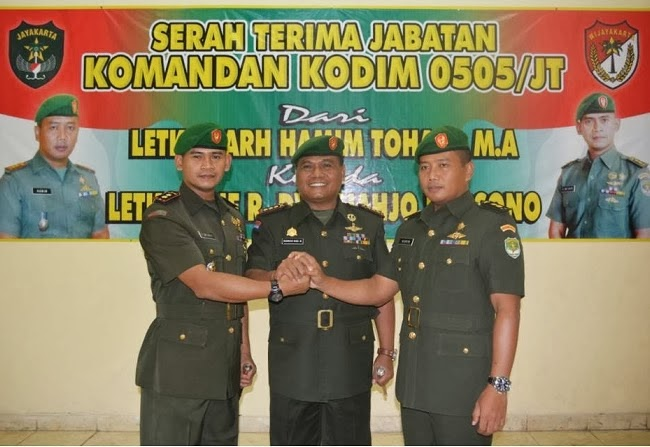
Hamim Tohari (right) at the handover ceremony of the Commander of the East Jakarta Military District.

Two years after his promotion as a battalion commander, Hamim was named as the commander of East Jakarta Military District on 4 July 2012. He was later replaced on 6 November 2013 and was transferred to the Indonesian Military Academy as the head of the social and linguistics department on 23 September 2014. He left the post on 6 May 2015 and was consecutively transferred to the Army Information Service and the Army Intelligence Center. From there, he was moved to South Sulawesi and became the assistant for intelligence affairs in the province's military region from 2020 until 26 March 2021.

On 1 April 2021, Hamim was installed as the chief of staff of the Merauke military region. While serving as the chief of staff, Hamim attended an armed forces teleconference at the end of 2021. During the teleconference, an incident occurred where Hamim was scolded by the commander-in-chief of the armed forces, Andika Perkasa, for using his phone and not listening to the commander-in-chief's speech. After the meeting's recording was publicized to the media, Hamim was dismissed from his post as chief of staff. The dismissal was made official through a decree dated 30 December 2021. He officially handed over his post to the new officeholder in early February 2022.

Upon his dismissal from the post, Hamim was named as the Secretary of the Army Information Services. Less than three months later, on 29 July 2022, the commander-in-chief of the armed forces named him as the Chief of the Army Information Services, a position commonly known as the army spokesperson. He was installed for the position on 3 September 2022 and was promoted to brigadier general on 14 October 2022.

In his capacity as the head of the army's information center, Hamim was tasked to lead the effort of the army's information center to recover the army's Twitter account, which had been hacked since August. The information center managed to recover the account in mid-September. In response to the hacking incident, Hamim announced that the army would improve their cyber security.

Hamim handed over his position as the Chief of the Army Information Services on 31 October 2023 to Kristomei Sianturi and became the expert staff for environment to the army chief of staff. Afterwards, Hamim was appointed as the chief of expert staffs to the Commander of the Army Strategic Reserve Command on 22 March 2024 and officially assumed the post on 19 April 2024. Hamim received an honorary Army Strategic Reserve Command brevet on 16 October 2024. On 6 October 2026, Hamim was appointed as the commander of the Halu Oleo (Central Sulawesi) military area by the armed forces commander decree.
