= Budiman Sudjatmiko =

Indonesian activist and politician

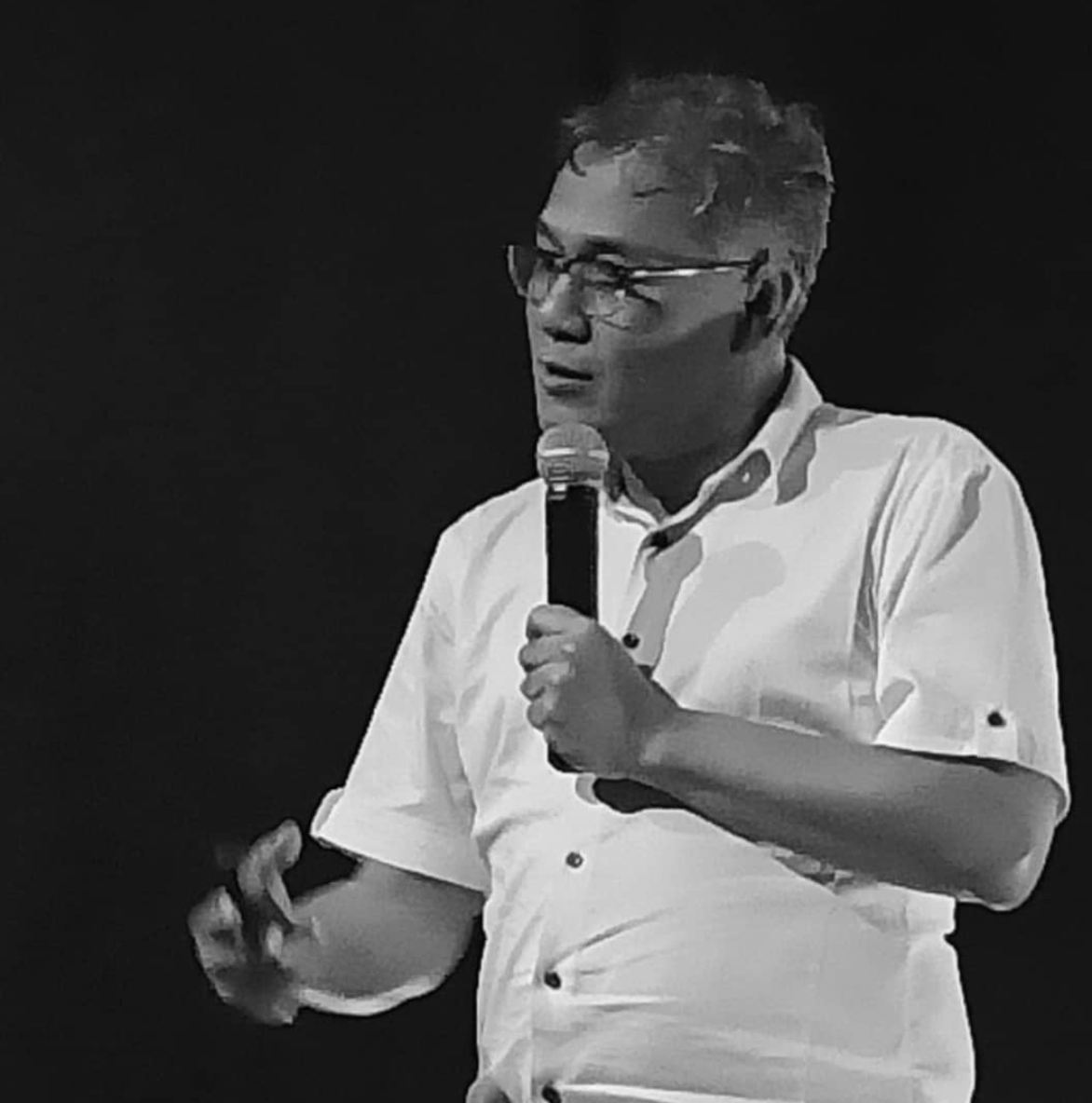
- Sudjatmiko in 2019

Head of the Acceleration of Poverty Reduction Agency
- Incumbent
- Assumed office 22 October 2024
- President: Prabowo Subianto
- Preceded by: Position established

Member of the House of Representatives
- In office 1 October 2009 – 30 September 2019
- Preceded by: Multi-member district
- Succeeded by: Multi-member district
- Constituency: Central Java VIII

Chairman of the People's Democratic Party
- In office 22 July 1996 – 2001

Personal details
- Born: 10 March 1970 (age 56) Majenang, Cilacap, Indonesia
- Party: Independent (2001–2004; since 2023)
- Other political affiliations: PRD (1996–2001); PDI-P (2004–2023)
- Spouse: Kesi Yovana (m. 2005)
- Children: Puti Jasmina
- Education: Gadjah Mada University; SOAS, University of London; Clare Hall, University of Cambridge
- Website: budimansudjatmiko.net

Budiman Sudjatmiko (born 10 March 1970 in Majenang, Cilacap) is an Indonesian activist, politician and actor. He is known for co-authoring the Indonesian Village Law and founding the Innovators 4.0 Movement. He is also known as a reform activist for his involvement in founding and leading the People's Democratic Party (PRD), and infamously, reading out the PRD manifesto in the courtroom. His book, Anak-Anak Revolusi, became one of the sources of information about the world of activism during the New Order era.

By the New Order, he was falsely blamed for inciting the 27 July Incident in the storming of the Indonesian Democratic Party (PDI) office and was later sentenced to 13 years in prison. He was a political prisoner until the final years of the Suharto regime.

== Early life and education ==
Sudjatmiko is the son of Wartono (father) and Sri Sulastri (mother), the first of four children. His family raised him in a religious atmosphere. He began to pay attention to the poverty that ensnared the lower class when he found his childhood caregiver committed suicide due to immense debt. Budiman has been active in various discussions and organizational activities ever since he was in junior high school.

He spent his childhood in Bogor, attending primary school at SD Negeri Pengadilan 2 Bogor. He continued his junior high school education at SMP Negeri 1 Cilacap, graduating in 1986. For senior high school, he attended SMA Negeri 5 Bogor and SMA Muhammadiyah 1 Yogyakarta, graduating in 1989. He was in the management structure of the Muhammadiyah Student Association while studying at Muhammadiyah 1 Yogyakarta High School.

Although he initially pursued higher education at Gadjah Mada University. He was involved in the student movement while studying at the Faculty of Economics at Gadjah Mada University (UGM). With this, he immersed himself in student movements and as a community organizer who carried out political, organizational and economic empowerment processes among farmers and plantation workers around Central Java and East Java. As a result of his activities, he did not have time to complete his studies. He later resumed his education after imprisonment, studying Political Science at the University of London's School of Oriental and African Studies (SOAS) and earning a Master of International Relations at Clare Hall, Cambridge.

== Career ==
=== Establishment of the PRD and imprisonment by the New Order ===
Inspired by revolutionary movements, he dropped out of university to focus on a people power movement. He was chairman of the People's Democratic Association (Perhimpunan Rakyat Demokratik), which in July 1996 formed the People's Democratic Party (PRD) — at a time when it was illegal to form political parties. PRD opposed the regime of long-serving President Suharto.

Shortly after the PRD's declaration, state troops and hired thugs on 27 July 1996 attacked pro-democracy activists during a protest in Central Jakarta, killing at least five people. This incident, also known as the Gray Saturday, was a raid on the DPP office of the Indonesian Democratic Party on Jl. Diponegoro, Jakarta. Fighting broke out among supporters of the Indonesian Democratic Party (PDI) who had split over their DPP office located at Jl. Diponegoro 58, Central Jakarta. Following resistance from PDI supporters and also from the people of Jakarta, the city was set ablaze on July 27. As a result Budiman was used as a scapegoat by the New Order government and was accused of being the mastermind for supposedly orchestrating the month-long Free Speech.

Budiman was made a scapegoat for the riot and PRD was accused of being a communist organization that had sought to forcibly overthrow the government. The military and police sought to arrest Budiman and exerted pressure on his parents. On 5 August 1996, Lieutenant General Syarwan Hamid claimed there were "indications" that Budiman's father was a former member of the outlawed Indonesian Communist Party. Budiman was arrested on 11 August 1996, accused of subversion and insulting the government. In April 1997, he received a 13 year jail sentence. Due to the victory of the democracy movement, Budiman only served 3.5 years after being granted amnesty by President Abdurrahman Wahid on December 10, 1999. He was released on 10 December 1999, more than one year and six months after Suharto's downfall.

Budiman was a supporter of reformist President Abdurrahman Wahid, who was impeached and removed from power on 23 July 2001 after losing the support of the military and parliament. Prior to Wahid's removal, Budiman was among a group of 40 people—mostly foreigners—briefly detained when police and an Islamic militia group raided an anti-globalization conference in Depok on 8 June 2001. Budiman later in 2001 resigned as chairman of PRD.

=== Joining the PDIP and DPR-RI member ===
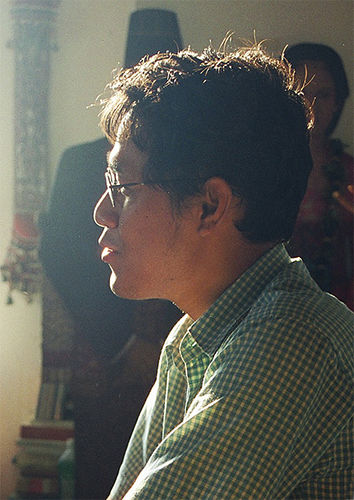
Budiman Sudjatmiko in 2002

After returning to Indonesia, in late 2004 Budiman joined the Indonesian Democratic Party of Struggle (PDI-P), one of Indonesia's major political parties, and formed REPDEM (Relawan Perjuangan Demokrasi), a wing organization of the party. On this movement, he commented:

Although there is still much which must be sorted out in terms of professionalism, ethics and morals, in the vision of struggle and other programs within the PDI-P, all of this is a challenge for the PDI-P to become the party of the little people.

In the 2009‒2019 period, Budiman served as a member of the House of Representatives (DPR-RI) from PDI Perjuangan (from Central Java Electoral District VIII: Banyumas Regency and Cilacap Regency) and sat in Commission II in charge of domestic government, regional autonomy, state apparatus, and agrarian affairs; and was also the Deputy Chairman of the Special Committee for the Village Bill.

At the international level, Budiman is actively involved as a member of the Steering Committee of the Network of Social Democracy in Asia. Currently, he also holds the position of President Supervisor in the National Leadership Council of the Parade Nusantara organization, an organization that gathers village heads and all village officials throughout Indonesia whose main agenda is to fight for the knowledge of the rural development bill. Budiman Sudjatmiko was actively involved in spearheading the drafting of the Village Law in 2009. He promised the drafting of the Village Bill to his constituents while campaigning in the legislative elections, which was later realized by the drafting of the bill, after a similar idea had not been successfully realized since 2005.

After getting into office, Budiman Sudjatmikio became a political anchor for village activists, for example bringing together village activists with the Second Commission of the DPR, institutionally and personally. The realization of Parade Nusantara (2009) under the leadership of Sudir Santosa, where Budiman Sudjatmiko was also present as a coach, made the push to realize this law even stronger, culminating in September to December 2011. Finally, due to the pressure, President Susilo Bambang Yudhoyono issued an presidential decree on the Village Bill in January 2012. The House of Representatives then formed a Special Committee on the Village Bill led by Chairman Akhmad Muqowam (PPP), and vice-chairmen Budiman Sujatmiko (PDI-P), Khatibul Umam Wiranu (Democrat) and Ibnu Munzir (Golkar).

Budiman was appointed by the Minister Erick Thohir as Independent Commissioner of PT Perkebunan Nusantara V (Persero) in January 2021.

=== Diaspora outreach ===
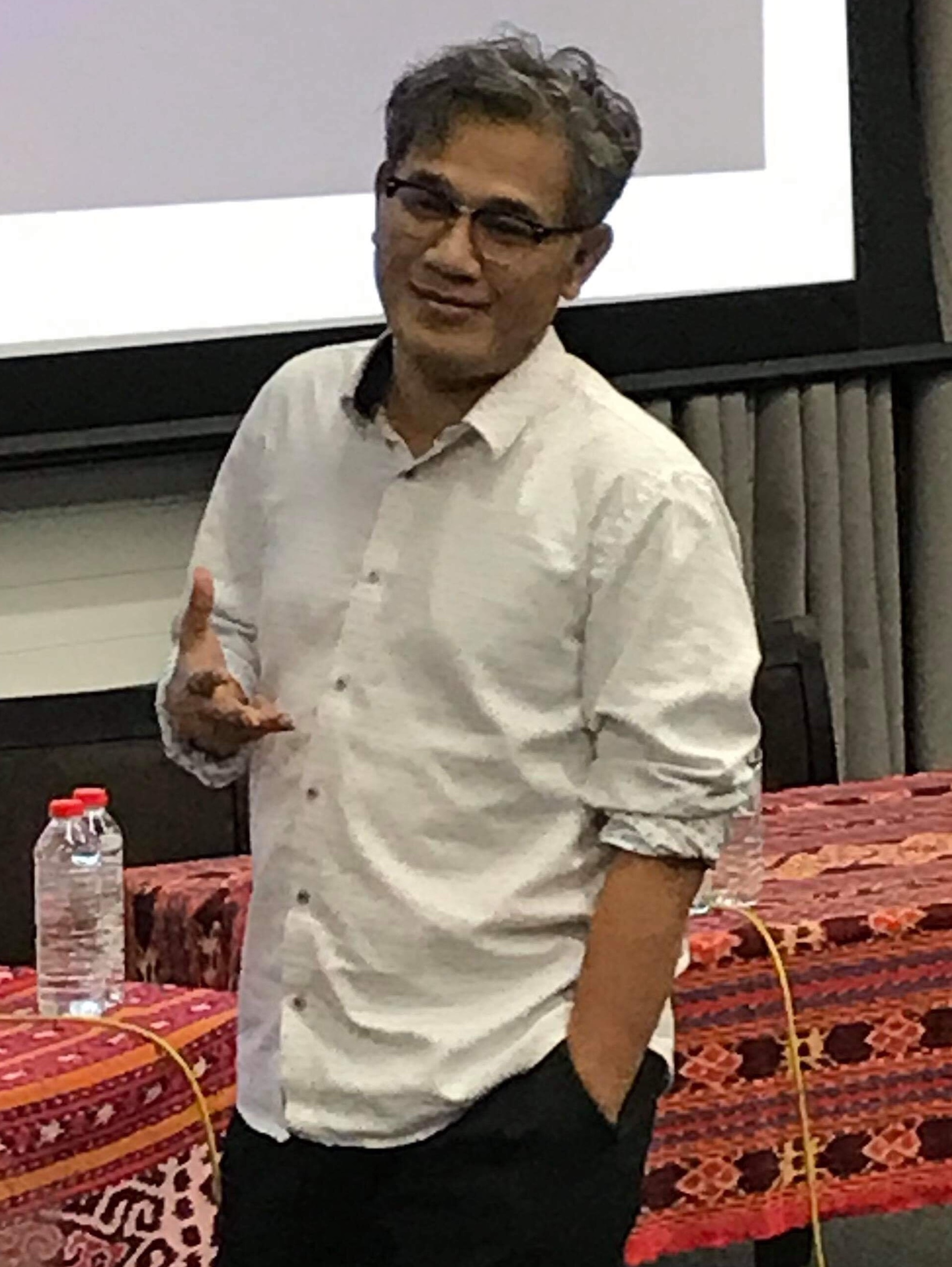
Budiman Sudjatmiko giving a lecture at the School of Oriental and African Studies, London (2019).

On September 11, 2018, Inovator 4.0 Indonesia was declared with Budiman Sudjatmiko as its chairman. This community consists of academics, engineers, researchers, programmers, artists, doctors and others related to quantum computing, genetic engineering, precision agriculture, artificial intelligence, drones, automation, renewable energy sources, education, talent management, and socio-culture to trigger Indonesia's leap towards Industrial Revolution 4.0.

On August 19, 2019, Budiman Sudjatmiko along with various experts, talents, and academics of PhD Innovators 4.0 Indonesia from abroad met the president of the Republic of Indonesia and made a statement that they are ready to return home to help build the country and pass on the knowledge they have gained to other talents in Indonesia, especially in villages. Innovators 4.0 Indonesia also pioneered the warning about Firehose of Falsehood during the 2019 elections and provided education to defeat it.

Budiman Sudjatmiko himself is a politician who is active on social media, especially Twitter (now X). The opinions he writes on his official social media are often quoted by the media as news. In June 2014, Budiman had another social media feud with Hutomo Mandala Putra, the son of Suharto. This feud smacked of the old grudge between the two in 1998 that led to the fall of the New Order regime.

=== Fired by the PDI-P ===
The Indonesian Democratic Party of Struggle (PDIP) has officially fired Budiman Sudjatmiko as a party cadre, following his support for Prabowo Subianto as a presidential candidate in the 2024 presidential election. The dismissal letter was signed directly by the General Chairperson of the PDI-P, Megawati Soekarnoputri, and PDIP Secretary General, Hasto Kristiyanto, Thursday, August 24, 2023.

He is currently the director of ResPublica Institute, an Indonesian defense think tank.

== Publication ==
Budiman Sudjatmiko launched his first book Anak-Anak Revolusi in Jakarta in April 2012. This book is the true story of Budiman Sudjatmiko's long and winding journey to find answers and fight for his dreams that were embedded from an early age. Budiman deliberately wrote this book himself because it tells the story of Indonesia that Budiman witnessed firsthand. The first volume of this two-volume set tells the story from Budiman Sudjatmiko's childhood until he was imprisoned by the New Order. Starting from his inner question as a child about why there is poverty, then finding his way to politics, to his struggle to realize the ideals of Indonesian Democracy.

== Personal life ==
During his youth, he is said to be a long time fan of Indonesian Jazz Fusion group Indonesia 6.

== Filmography ==
=== Film ===
| Year | Title | Role | Notes |
|---|---|---|---|
| 2008 | The Tarix Jabrix | Interviewer | |
| 2013 | Soekarno: Indonesia Merdeka | Suyudi | |
| 2017 | Jomblo Reboot | Lecturer | |
| 2020 | Dignitate | Papa Alfi | |

== Election history ==
| Election | Position | Constituency | Political party | Number of votes | Election results |
|---|---|---|---|---|---|
| 2004 Indonesian legislative election | House of Representatives | Central Java VIII | PDI-P | 96,830 | Winning |
| 2014 Indonesian legislative election | House of Representatives | Central Java VIII | PDI-P | 68,861 | Winning |
| 2019 Indonesian legislative election | House of Representatives | East Java VII | PDI-P | 48,806 | Lost |
