= Majenang =

District in Indonesia

Majenang is a district in Cilacap Regency, Central Java, Indonesia. Geographically, the district has an area of 138.56 km^{2}; it had a population of 122,763 at the 2010 Census and 140,329 at the 2020 Census. It encompasses 17 villages. There have been proposals to separate western parts of Cilacap, including Majenang to form a new regency.
