= Red and White Cooperative =

Red and White Village Cooperative in Bentangan, Wonosari District, Klaten, Central Java

Village/Subdistrict Cooperative Red and White, or Red and White Cooperative, is an Indonesian government program that establishes cooperative at the village and subdistrict levels. Prabowo Subianto launched the program in 2025. According to Regulation No. 12/Press/SM.4.1.KOP/VII/2025, the cooperatives consist of residents of the respective villages or subdistricts and operate according to cooperative principles.

Depending on the area, the cooperatives are named Village Red and White Cooperative or Subdistrict Red and White Cooperative.

== Funding sources ==
The Red and White Village Cooperatives (Kopdes Merah Putih) program primarily draws funding from the State Budget Surplus Balance (Saldo Anggaran Lebih, SAL), rather than from the State Budget (APBN), Regional Budget (APBD), or Village Budget (APBDes). The SAL funds are deposited in state-owned banks, such as Bank Rakyat Indonesia, Bank Negara Indonesia, Bank Mandiri, and Bank Syariah Indonesia, which then provide loans to the cooperatives.

Each cooperative can apply for loans of up to Rp3 billion, with an annual interest rate of 6% and a maximum repayment period of six years. If a cooperative defaults, up to 30% of village funds may be used as a last-resort guarantee for loan repayment.

== Structure and Oversight ==
Under the Minister of Finance Regulation No. 49 of 2025, village heads or urban village heads serve as ex officio supervisors of the Red and White Cooperatives. Village heads are not only responsible for assisting with the cooperatives' legal establishment but also for overseeing their development, human resource training, and governance. Appointing village heads as ex officio supervisors has drawn criticism for contradicting the principles of cooperative independence and democracy.

== Digitalization ==
The Ministry of Cooperatives provides SIMKODES MOBILE, an application that supports the administrative and operational activities of Red and White Village/Urban Village Cooperatives.

== Criticism and Controversies ==
Using the State Budget Surplus Balance (SAL) as the primary funding source has been considered controversial and risky, as SAL is meant to cover budget deficits rather than finance cooperative lending programs. Several observers have highlighted the potential for moral hazard and a high risk of loan defaults, given that many newly established cooperatives lack experience in business management. Furthermore, the village fund guarantee mechanism may be burdensome for village finances and could reduce funding for local development.

The appointment of village heads as ex-officio supervisors is also seen as potentially undermining the independence of cooperatives and strengthening bureaucratic control over village economic institutions.

Another controversy emerged in May 2026 when a video circulated on social media showing a fleet of trucks bearing the Kopdes Merah Putih label collecting stocks of goods from an Indomarco warehouse, a distribution entity under the Salim Group, which also owns the Indomaret retail chain. The incident raised public questions about the program's supply chain: whether public funds used for cooperative operations were instead flowing into a conglomerate's distribution network rather than supporting local producers or village-based micro, small, and medium-sized enterprises (MSMEs), as originally intended by the program.

Four candidate KDMP managers died during Indonesian Development Mobilizer Graduates (SPPI) basic military training. They were Yonanda Taufiq, who suffered cardiac arrest in Baturaja on 17 June; Anisa, who suffered heatstroke in Balikpapan on 18 June; Novia, who died of tuberculosis in Jakarta on 23 June; and Rifki, who died of respiratory distress in Jakarta on 26 June. A total of four people died between 17 and 26 June 2026.

== See also ==
- Village cooperative
