= Konstanz University of Applied Sciences =

German university

Hochschule Konstanz
- Hochschule Konstanz Technik, Wirtschaft und Gestaltung (HTWG)
- Type: Public
- Established: 1906
- President: Sabine Rein
- Total staff: 414 (2022)
- Students: 4,883 (2021)
- Address: Alfred-Wachtel-Strasse 8 D-78462, Konstanz, Baden-Württemberg, Germany; 47.6671°N 9.17176°E
- Website: htwg-konstanz.de

Konstanz University of Applied Sciences (German: Hochschule Konstanz Technik, Wirtschaft und Gestaltung) or HTWG, is a German university of applied sciences located in Konstanz, Baden-Württemberg. It is a member of Lake Constance Arts & Sciences Association.

The university was established in 1906 by Alfred Wachtel and named the "Technicum Konstanz". Initially there were only three departments: engineering, technical studies, and the school for 'Werkmeister' - postgraduate work.

== Faculties ==
- Architecture and Design
- Civil Engineering
- Electronic and Information Technology
- Computer Sciences
- Mechanical Engineering
- Business and social sciences
- College for Foreign Students (ASK)

=== Bachelor majors ===
- Architecture
- Applied Computer Science (replaced technical computer science and software engineering)
- Civil Engineering
- Business Administration
- Electronic and Information Technology
- Communications Design
- Mechanical Engineering/Construction and Development
- Mechanical Engineering/Production
- Transport and Environmental Technology
- Business Information Systems
- Healthcare Computer Science
- Engineering Economics in Construction
- Engineering Economics in Electrical Sciences/ Informatics
- Engineering Economics in Mechanical Engineering
- Economic Language Asia and Management in Chinese
- Economic Language Asia and Management in Malayan
- Chemistry

=== Master majors ===
- Architecture
- Asian-European Relations and Management
- Automotive Systems Engineering
- Civil Engineering
- Business Administration
- Business Information Technology
- Computer Science
- Communications Design
- Mechanical Engineering and International Sales Management
- Mechatronics
- Environmental/ Production Sciences
- Engineering Economics
