= Free Nutritious Meals =

Indonesian government initiative

- Makan Bergizi Gratis
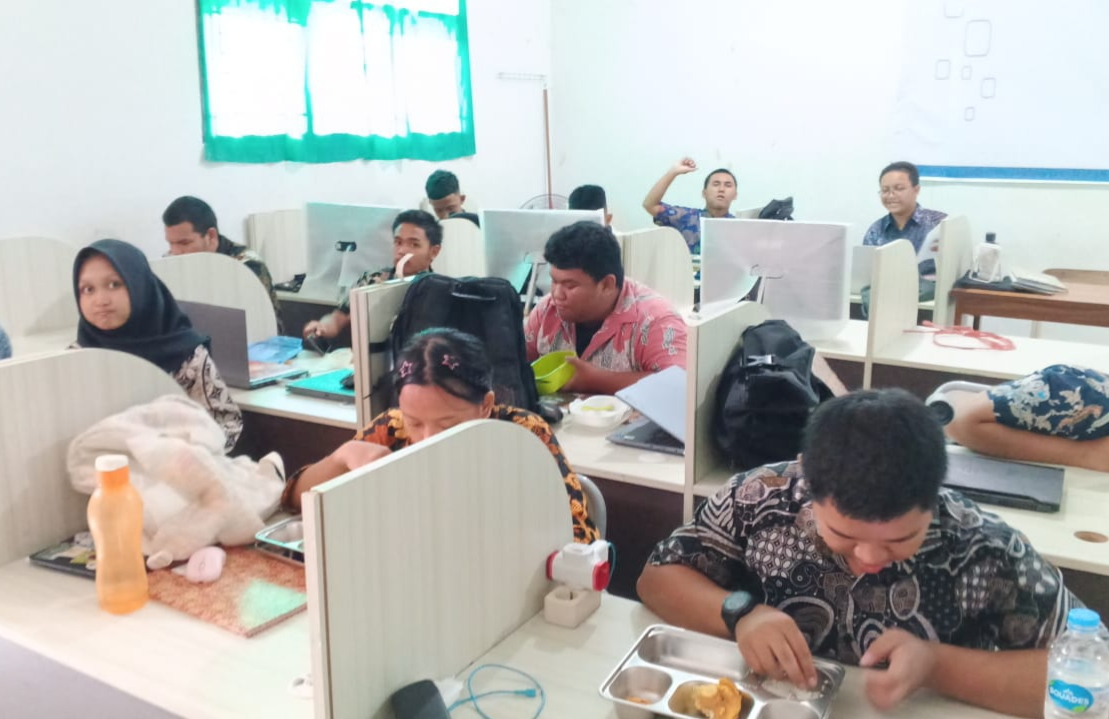
- High school students in Kalimantan eat free meals, October 2025
- Type of project: Government-sponsored free meal and scheme
- Country: Indonesia
- Key people: Prabowo Subianto; Sudaryono; Agustina Arumsari
- Key contributors: National Nutrition Agency
- Launched: 6 January 2025; 22 months ago
- Budget: IDR 335 trillion (US$21 billion) (January 2026)
- Status: Active

The Free Nutritious Meals (Indonesian: Makan Bergizi Gratis or MBG), sometimes simply called as the Free Meal Program, is Indonesia's free lunch program under President Prabowo Subianto's administration which has been running gradually since 6 January 2025. The program primarily targets high school/vocational students, as well as pregnant and lactating women. Although it was designed with claims to improve people's nutrition and reduce stunting rates, the implementation of the program has drawn some criticism and rejection in various regions, especially because it caused poisoning cases.

== History ==
=== Early initiatives (1991–2023) ===
Prior to the national rollout in 2025, Indonesia implemented several localised and smaller-scale school feeding programs. Since 1991, the government launched pilot programs as part of a poverty alleviation strategy, providing snacks to students in underdeveloped villages. This was expanded in 1996 to reach over 2 million students but was largely halted following the 1997 Asian financial crisis. In 2016, the Ministry of Education and Culture introduced the Nutrition Programme for School Children (PROGAS), which provided nutritious breakfasts to students in regions with high stunting rates.

=== 2024 presidential campaign ===
The current large-scale free meal program was a flagship campaign promise of Prabowo Subianto and Gibran Rakabuming Raka during the 2024 Indonesian presidential election. Originally proposed as "Makan Siang Gratis" (Free Lunch), the initiative aimed to address Indonesia’s high stunting rate, which stood at approximately 21.5% in 2022. Following their election victory, the program's scope was expanded to include pregnant women, breastfeeding mothers, and toddlers, and the name was officially changed to Makan Bergizi Gratis (MBG) or Free Nutritious Meals to emphasise nutritional quality over the time of day the meal is served.

=== Launch and implementation (2024–present) ===
To manage the program, the government established the National Nutrition Agency (Badan Gizi Nasional or BGN) in August 2024. Throughout the latter half of 2024, the government conducted several pilot projects in cities like Tangerang and Sukabumi to test logistics and meal costs, which were estimated at approximately IDR 15.000 per portion.

The program officially launched nationwide on 6 January 2025. In its initial phase, it targeted approximately 15 to 20 million beneficiaries using a budget of IDR 71 trillion. The implementation utilises a "central kitchen" system (Satuan Pemenuhan Pelayanan Gizi, SPPG), where meals are prepared in dedicated hubs and distributed to local schools. The Indonesian government aims to scale the program to reach 82.9 million people by 2029.

In March 2026, the government announced that the program would be scaled down due to "fiscal efficiency" concerns as a result of the 2026 fuel crisis.

== Food poisoning cases ==
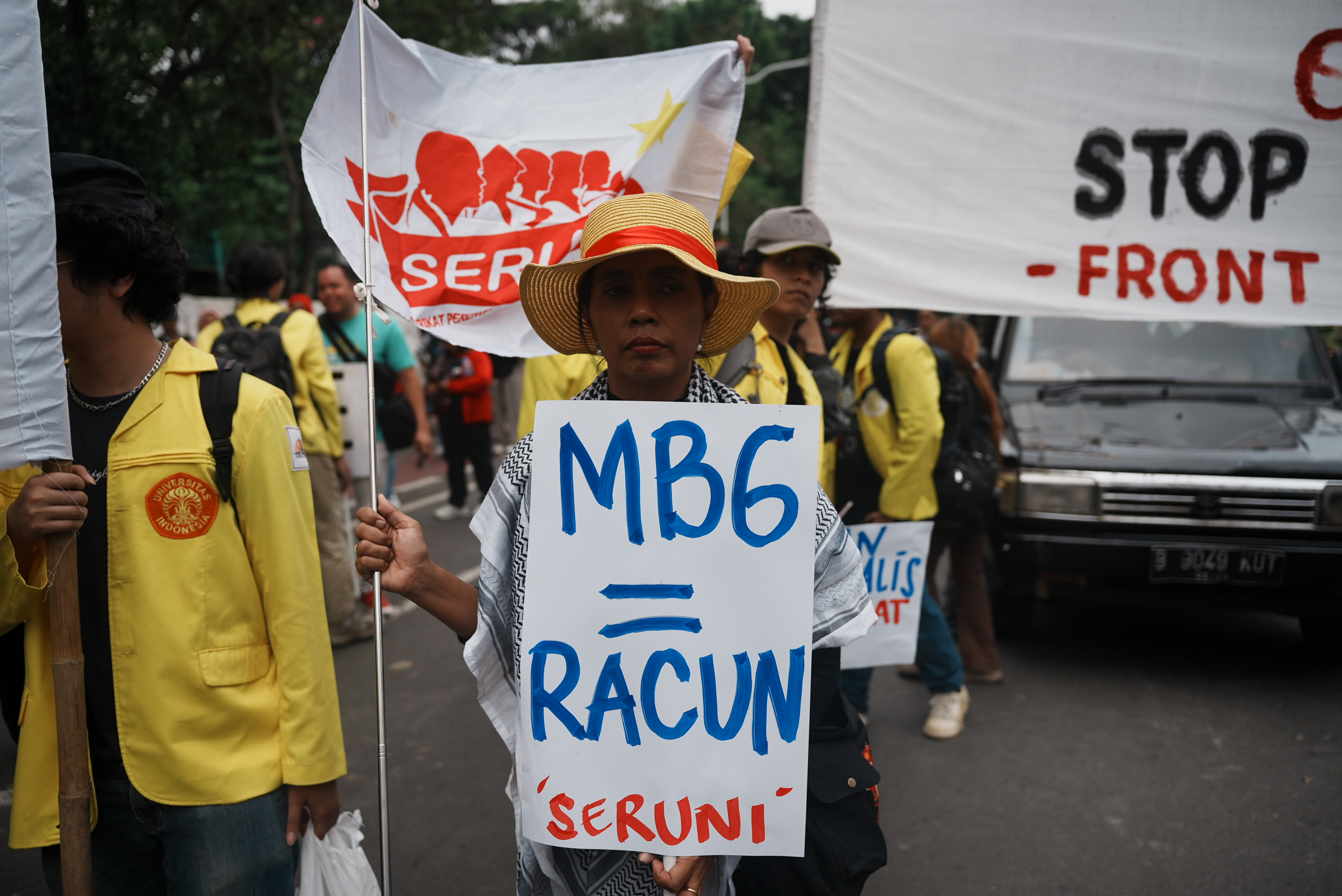
A woman wearing a straw-hat holds a sign remarking MBG programs are poison, referencing the repeated food poisoning cases around Indonesia, 20 October 2025.

Since the launch of the free meals programme on 6 January 2025, there have been repeated instances of mass food poisoning reported nationwide. The first case occurred on 16 January in Sukoharjo, when ten students fell ill, followed by similar incidents across multiple provinces. By late September, 6,452 children had been affected nationwide, and the National Nutrition Agency noted 4,711 suspected cases out of one billion portions served. A subsequent report recorded 16,109 affected pupils as of 31 October. The high number of affected students led the phenomenon to gain nation-wide and even international attention.

=== Critics ===
Multiple NGOs, including Center for Indonesia's Strategic Development Initiatives (CISDI) and Network for Education Watch (JPPI), have urged the government to temporarily suspend the IDR 171 trillion ($10 billion) program after hundreds of students contracted food poisoning from the meals. During the parliamentary hearing, the head of JPPI referred to the outbreaks of food poisoning as a "systematic failure".

Several protests have occurred in response to the incidents. On 27 September, hundreds of concerned mothers gathered in Sleman. The concerned mothers created sounds with kitchenware, protesting the free meal program's high number of food poisoning cases. A similar effort also occurred in Monas, Jakarta. Located near the State Palace, concerned mothers protested the free meal program with posters filled with satirical comments about the program.

=== Government's response ===
The Ministry of Health attributed these incidents to bacterial and viral contamination linked to poor kitchen sanitation. Indonesia's Minister of Health, Budi Gunadi Sadikin, elaborated on the finding, citing various reasons, such as poor sanitation in the kitchen.

On 5 May, President Prabowo Subianto defended the initiative. He speculated that the food poisoning cases could be caused by students eating the lunches with their bare hands. He stated that the program received tighter standard operating procedures. On 15 October, President Prabowo acknowledged the flaws of his initiative, but cited a 0.0007 percent rate of food poisoning incidents.

Indonesia's Coordinating Minister for Human Development and Culture Zulkifli Hasan emphasised that the government is giving “very serious attention” to the program. He added that the success of the free meal program would determine the success of the Prabowo administration. In the same interview, he also stated that President Prabowo has formed a coordination team comprising 13 ministries and government agencies that will hold daily monitoring meetings at the Coordinating Ministry for Food Affairs’s office to evaluate the MBG program daily. A coordination team comprising 13 ministries was subsequently formed for daily monitoring.

In August 2026, authorities instructed that the meals must be consumed within four hours of being cooked to prevent food poisoning.

=== National parliament ===
On 15 October, Habiburokhman, chairperson of House Commission III, expressed that "every program is bound to have issues", comparing the MBG initiative to coordinating a daily national celebration.

=== Regional executives ===
In West Java, Governor Dedi Mulyadi suspended the program in four affected areas after hundreds of people fell sick after eating the free lunches in West Bandung and Sukabumi regions. Dedi also acknowledged that the government needs to evaluate the program and address students' trauma after eating the food.
