= National Nutrition Agency =

Government agency of Indonesia

- Badan Gizi Nasional
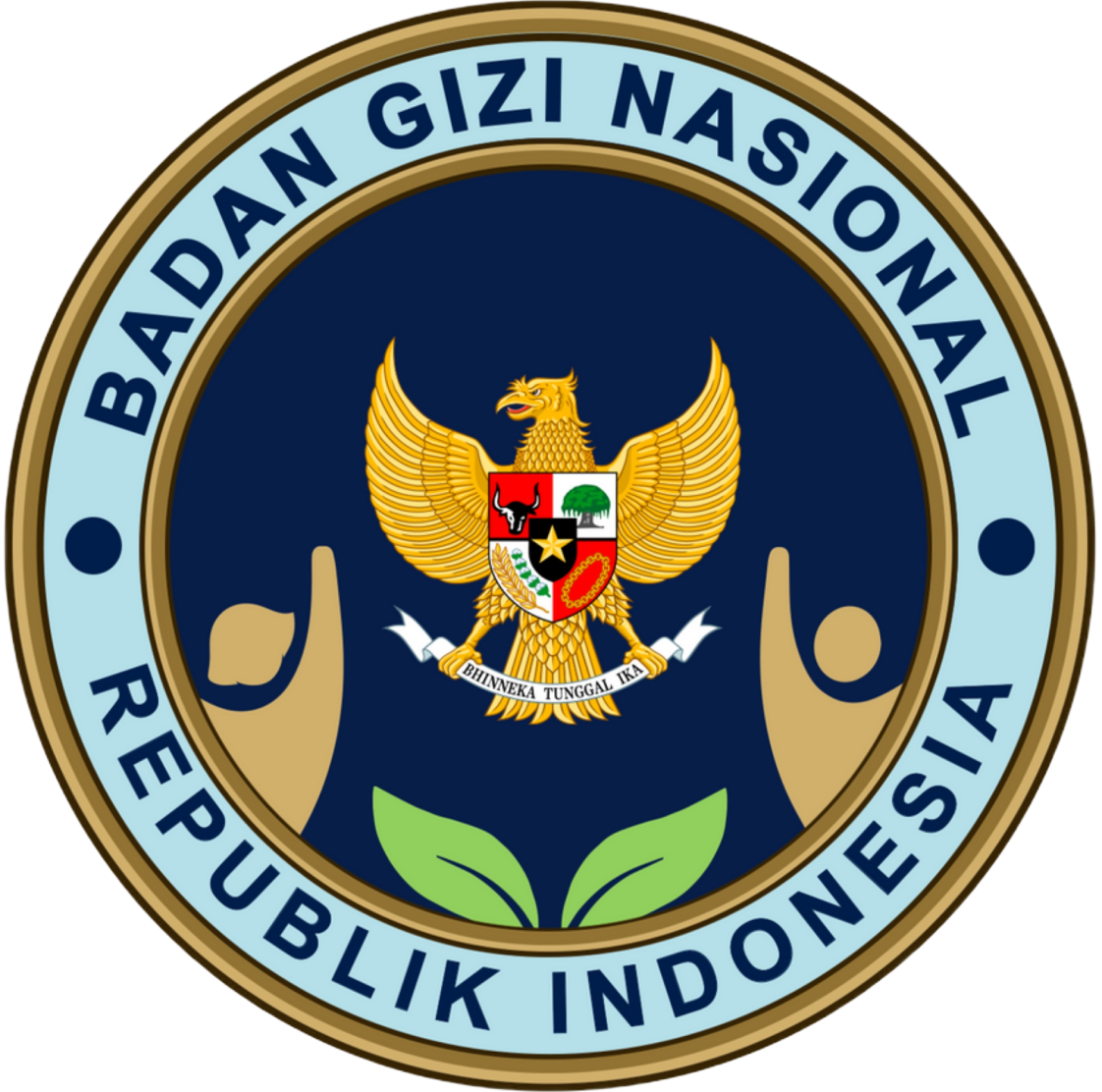

Agency overview
- Formed: 15 August 2024
- Preceding agency: Deputy II of the National Food Agency
- Jurisdiction: Indonesia
- Headquarters: Gedung E Kementerian Pertanian Jl. Harsono RM 3, Ragunan, Pasar Minggu, Jakarta
- Annual budget: IDR 71 trillion (USD 4.542 billion) (2025)
- Agency executives: Sudaryono, Chief; Agustina Arumsari, TNI Maj. General Trenggono, Deputies
- Website: www.bgn.go.id

The National Nutrition Agency (Indonesian: Badan Gizi Nasional; BGN), is a cabinet-level agency formed by President Joko Widodo to initiate Prabowo Subianto's free lunch for students and provide nutritional adequacy for four vulnerable groups: students (of elementary to senior high school, special education, and Islamic boarding school), toddlers, pregnant women, and lactating women. 82.9 million people of total Indonesian population will be targeted as beneficiary of this program.

This agency is realization of Prabowo's campaign for providing free, nutritious food.

== History ==
During his campaign, Prabowo promised that he will provide lunches for students.

As the foundation of the agency, Deputy II (Food and Nutritional Insecurity), a deputy of the National Food Agency, was removed from the agency and transformed into the new agency. Consequently, the National Nutrition Agency shared the same office with the National Food Agency during its formation period.

On 15 August 2024, Joko Widodo signed the formation of two of Prabowo's future cabinet-level agencies. The National Nutrition Agency is one of these agencies, established to facilitate and fulfil Prabowo's mission.

Although it was created to support Prabowo's free lunch programme, Joko Widodo expects that in the future, the agency will not only serve as a facilitator of the free lunch programme but also promote and cultivate a healthy lifestyle in Indonesia.

In October 2024, Dadan Hindayana, Head of the National Nutrition Agency, announced that the Indonesian government plans to allocate up to Rp 800 billion (US $51.16 million) per day for a free meals programme to feed children across the country.

On 2 June 2026, President Prabowo removed Dadan as chair of BGN and Sony Sonjaya and Lodewyk Pusung as deputies; Dadan was succeeded by Nanik S Deyang. The following day, on 3 June, Dadan, Sony, and Lodewyk were arrested by the Attorney General's Office. The BGN headquarters was also searched by the AGO on the same day. Subsequently, the deputy head of the agency, Nanik Sudaryati Deyang was appointed as the new agency head. However, she left the agency after 45 days due to health issues. Deputy Agriculture Minister Sudaryono was appointed on 22 July 2026 as the new agency head.

== Funding ==
IDR 71 trillion (US$4.542 billion) was allocated in 2025 when the National Nutrition Agency was fully operational to implement the free meals programme. Sri Mulyani, then-Minister of Finance, revealed that the IDR 71 trillion allocated to fund the programme has already been set aside and will not divert funds previously allocated for educational matters. For 2026, the budget was increased to IDR 335 trillion (US$21 billion), making it the largest budget allocation among all Indonesian ministries and agencies.

== Structure ==
Based on the Presidential Decree No. 83/2024, the agency consisted of:

- Office of Steering Committee of the National Nutrition Agency
  - Office of Chairman of Steering Committee of the National Nutrition Agency
  - Office of Vice Chairman of Steering Committee of the National Nutrition Agency
  - Steering Committees
- Executives
  - Office of Chief of the National Nutrition Agency
  - Office of Deputy Chief of the National Nutrition Agency
  - Office of Main Secretariat of the National Nutrition Agency
    - Bureau of Performance Management
    - Bureau of General Affairs and Finance
    - Bureau of Human Resources and Organization
    - Bureau of Legal Affairs and Public Relations
    - Bureau of State Properties Management and Services
  - Deputy I (System and Management)
    - Deputy I Secretariat
    - Directorate of Nutrition Fulfillment System
    - Directorate of Nutrition Fulfillment Management and Administration
    - Directorate of Nutrition Fulfillment Risk Management
  - Deputy II (Supply and Distribution)
    - Deputy II Secretariat
    - Directorate of Supply and Distribution I
    - Directorate of Supply and Distribution II
    - Directorate of Supply and Distribution III
  - Deputy III (Promotion and Cooperation)
    - Deputy III Secretariat
    - Directorate of Nutrition Promotion and Education
    - Directorate of Cooperation and Partnership
    - Directorate of Social Empowerment and Community Participation
  - Deputy IV (Monitoring and Supervision)
    - Deputy IV Secretariat
    - Directorate of Monitoring and Supervision I
    - Directorate of Monitoring and Supervision II
    - Directorate of Monitoring and Supervision III
  - Inspectorate
    - Main Inspectorate
    - Inspectorate I
    - Inspectorate II
    - Inspectorate III
  - Centers
    - Center for Data, Information, and Technology
  - Technical Implementation Units

Around 100 Technical Implementation Units will be formed as servicing units under the agency.

== List of Heads ==
Independent Gerindra
No.	Photo	Name	Assumed Office	Left Office	Term of Office	Political Party	Notes
1		Dadan Hindayana	19 August 2024	2 June 2026	1 year, 9 months, 14 days	Independent	(Note: Name Head of the National Nutrition Agency)
–	Vacant		2 June 2026	8 June 2026	7 days		
2		Nanik Sudaryati Deyang	8 June 2026	22 July 2026	1 months, 14 days	Independent	
3		Sudaryono	22 July 2026	Incumbent	85 days	Gerindra	

== Controversies ==
The MBG programme has faced criticism from civil society for alleged budget mismanagement, with only a small fraction of the state budget (APBN) allocation spent on food. Critics highlight excessive spending on SPPG kitchen staff salaries and "supporting attributes"—such as socks and electric motorcycles—procured at prices significantly above market value, leading to allegations of corruption.

Another controversy revolves around the procurement of 21,801 e-motorcycles from PT Adlas Sarana Elektrik and PT Yasa Artha Trimanunggal (Yasa Group). BGN purchased the "Emmo" brand bikes for up to Rp 50 million per unit, even though nearly identical models were listed on Alibaba.com for approximately Rp 10 million.
