= Swiss German University =

Sponsored university

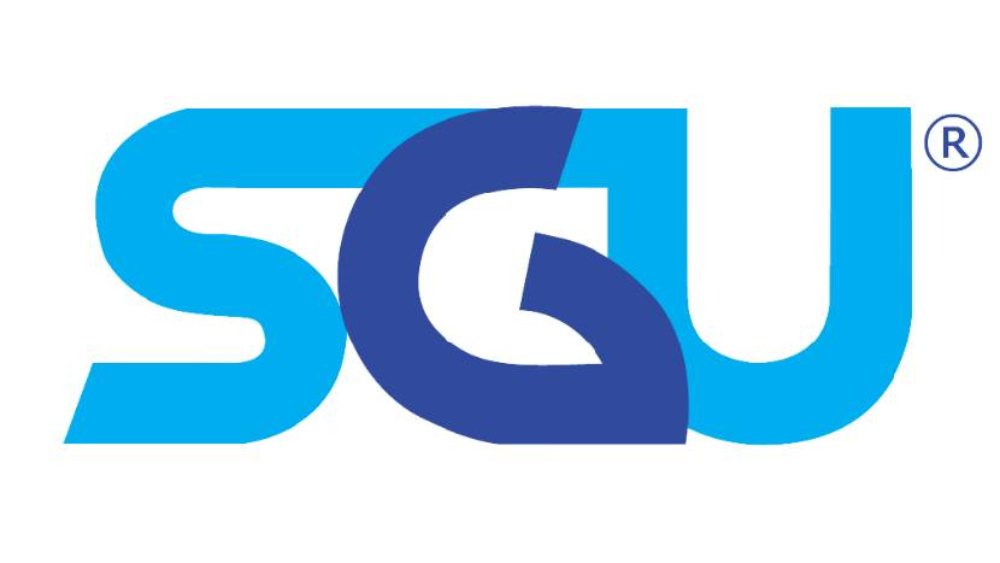
- Type: Private university
- Established: 2000
- Rector: Dr. Dipl. -Ing. Samuel P. Kusumocahyo
- Location: Tangerang City, Indonesia; 6°13′31.88″S 106°39′17.89″E
- Campus: The Prominence Tower, Jalan Jalur Sutera Barat Kav 15, Alam Sutera, Panunggangan Tim., Pinang, Kota Tangerang, Banten 15143, Indonesia
- Colors: Navy Blue
- Website: www.sgu.ac.id

Swiss German University (SGU) is a private international university located in Tangerang, Banten, Indonesia. Established in 2000, SGU is recognized as the first international university in Indonesia to offer an international curriculum and double-degree programs in collaboration with partner universities in Switzerland, Germany, and other countries. SGU provides undergraduate and postgraduate programs across engineering, information technology, business, communication, and life sciences. The university is accredited by the National Accreditation Board for Higher Education (BAN-PT) under the Ministry of Higher Education, Science, and Technology of the Republic of Indonesia.

== History ==
Swiss German University was established in 2000 with the objective of introducing an international standard of higher education in Indonesia. From its inception, SGU adopted an international curriculum delivered in English and emphasized strong collaboration with overseas partner universities, particularly in Switzerland and Germany.

In its early development, SGU pioneered double-degree programs that allow students to complete part of their studies and internships abroad while earning academic degrees from both SGU and its international partner institutions. Over the years, the university expanded its academic offerings to include programs in engineering, information technology, business, communication, and life sciences at both undergraduate and postgraduate levels.

SGU has continued to develop international academic collaborations, industry partnerships, and applied learning approaches such as project-based learning and global internship programs, positioning itself as an institution focused on producing graduates with global competencies and industry-relevant skills.

== International Rankings ==
No.	Ranking System	Year	Global Rank	Regional / Country Rank	Notes
1	EduRank	2025	#1817 (World)	#538 Asia; #29 Indonesia	Ranked #2 worldwide for Non-Academic Prominence
2	Webometrics	2025	#7686 (World)	#2660 Asia; #339 Indonesia	Based on web presence, visibility, and openness
3	uniRank	2025	#8129 (World)	#257 Indonesia	Based on institutional web popularity

== National Accreditation ==
Based on the Decree of the Director of the Executive Board of BAN-PT No. 2063/SK/BAN-PT/Ak.KP/PT/XI/2024 dated November 12, 2024, Swiss German University has been accredited "Very Good".

No.	Study Program	Degree	Decree Number	Decree Year	Grade	Expiration Date
1	Food Technology	S1	7487/SK/BAN-PT/Ak.Ppj/S/IX/2025	2025	B	2030/09/14
2	Communication Science	S1	719/SK/BAN-PT/Ak.Ppj/S/III/2024	2024	B	2029/03/20
3	Biomedical Engineering	S1	0453/SK/LAM Teknik/AS/XII/2023	2023	Baik Sekali	2028/12/20
4	Management	S2	860/DE/A.5/AR.10/XI/2023	2023	Baik Sekali	2028/11/02
5	Informatics	S2	140/SK/LAM-INFOKOM/Ak/M/XII/2022	2022	Baik Sekali	2027/12/23
6	Management	S1	499/DE/A.5/AR.10/VII/2023	2023	Unggul	2027/11/15
7	Mechanical Engineering	S1	0005/SK/LAM Teknik/AS/IV/2023	2023	Baik Sekali	2027/08/20
8	Accounting	S1	4579/SK/BAN-PT/Ak.Ppj/S/VII/2022	2022	Baik	2027/07/19
9	Informatics	S1	11239/SK/BAN-PT/Ak-PPJ/S/IX/2021	2021	B	2026/09/30
10	Mechanical Engineering	S2	10732/SK/BAN-PT/Akred/M/IX/2021	2021	Baik Sekali	2026/09/08
11	Industrial Engineering	S1	9958/SK/BAN-PT/Ak-PPJ/S/VIII/2021	2021	B	2026/07/30
12	Chemical Engineering	S1	8704/SK/BAN-PT/Ak-PPJ/S/VI/2021	2021	B	2026/06/11

== Faculty and Study Program ==
International Study Program

Faculty	Level	Study Program
Faculty of Engineering and Information Technology	Bachelor	Mechatronics Engineering
Faculty of Engineering and Information Technology		Mechatronics – Hybrid and Electric Vehicle
Faculty of Engineering and Information Technology		Industrial Engineering
Faculty of Engineering and Information Technology		Information Technology – Artificial Intelligence and Data Science
Faculty of Engineering and Information Technology		Information Technology – Business Innovation
Faculty of Engineering and Information Technology		Information Technology – Cyber Security
Faculty of Engineering and Information Technology	Master	Master of Information Technology (Data & AI – Cyber Security)
Faculty of Engineering and Information Technology		Master of Information Technology (Data & AI – Business Informatics)
Faculty of Engineering and Information Technology		Master of Information Technology (Digital Innovation)
Faculty of Engineering and Information Technology		Master of Informatics Engineering (Digital Transformation Management)
Faculty of Business and Communication (FBC)	Bachelor	International Management and Digital Business
Faculty of Business and Communication (FBC)		International Digital Hospitality and Tourism
Faculty of Business and Communication (FBC)		International Culinary Business
Faculty of Business and Communication (FBC)		Global Strategic Communications
Faculty of Business and Communication (FBC)		Digital Communication and Media Arts
Faculty of Business and Communication (FBC)	Master	Master of Management
Faculty of Business and Communication (FBC)		Master of Business Administration
Faculty of Life Sciences and Technology (FLST)	Bachelor	Food Technology
Faculty of Life Sciences and Technology (FLST)		Biomedical Engineering
Faculty of Life Sciences and Technology (FLST)		Medical Biotechnology
Faculty of Life Sciences and Technology (FLST)		Chemical Engineering
Faculty of Life Sciences and Technology (FLST)		Pharmaceutical Chemical Engineering
Faculty of Life Sciences and Technology (FLST)		Renewable Energy and Environment

National Plus Study Program

Faculty	Level	Study Program
Faculty of Engineering and Information Technology	Bachelor	Industrial Engineering
Faculty of Engineering and Information Technology	Master	Informatics Engineering – Digital Transformation Management
Faculty of Business and Communication	Bachelor	Accounting
Faculty of Business and Communication	Bachelor	Digital Business
Faculty of Business and Communication	Bachelor	Digital Communication & Media

== International Student Mobility ==
As an international institution, Swiss German University (SGU) integrates mobility programs directly into its academic framework to ensure global exposure for both its domestic and international students.

=== Outbound Mobility: Double Degree and Internships ===
SGU students gain international experience through two primary schemes:

- Double Degree Programs: This allows students to earn degrees from both SGU and its international partners. For programs in Germany and Switzerland, students complete three years of study in Indonesia followed by a final year abroad. For the Taiwan track, a 2+2 scheme is implemented, consisting of two years of study in each country.
- International Internships: During the 6th semester, students are required to undergo a mandatory internship at multinational corporations or research institutes abroad to gain professional experience in a global setting.

=== Inbound Student Exchange ===
SGU regularly hosts exchange students from partner universities worldwide for a duration of one to two semesters. These students join regular academic sessions and engage in cultural exchange activities, earning credits that are transferable to their home institutions.

=== International Regular Students ===
Since its establishment in 2000, SGU has consistently attracted international students pursuing a full 8-semester undergraduate degree (both Single and Double Degree tracks) in Indonesia. This diverse student body fosters a cosmopolitan and multicultural campus environment. Over the years, SGU has welcomed students from various regions, including:

- Europe: Germany, Switzerland, and the Netherlands.
- Asia: South Korea, Japan, China, Taiwan, Malaysia, and India.
- Others: Various countries across the Middle East and Africa.

== Course structure ==
Students need to complete two internships during their studies to obtain their double degrees. The first internship will be in Indonesia (domestic) and the second internship will be abroad (usually in Germany or Switzerland).

== University partners for the double degree programme ==
=== Bachelor's degree ===
- Fachhochschule Südwestfalen (Germany)
- Ernst-Abbe-Hochschule Jena (Germany)
- Hochschule Albstadt-Sigmaringen (Germany)
- International Management Institute (Switzerland)
- Ming Chuan University (Taiwan)

=== Master's degree ===
- SolBridge International School of Business (South Korea)

== Campus location ==
Alam Sutera Campus: The Prominence Tower Alam Sutera, Jl. Jalur Sutera Barat. No. 15, RT.003/RW.006, Panunggangan Tim., Kec. Pinang, Kota Tangerang, Banten 15143
