= Susilo Bambang Yudhoyono =

President of Indonesia from 2004 to 2014

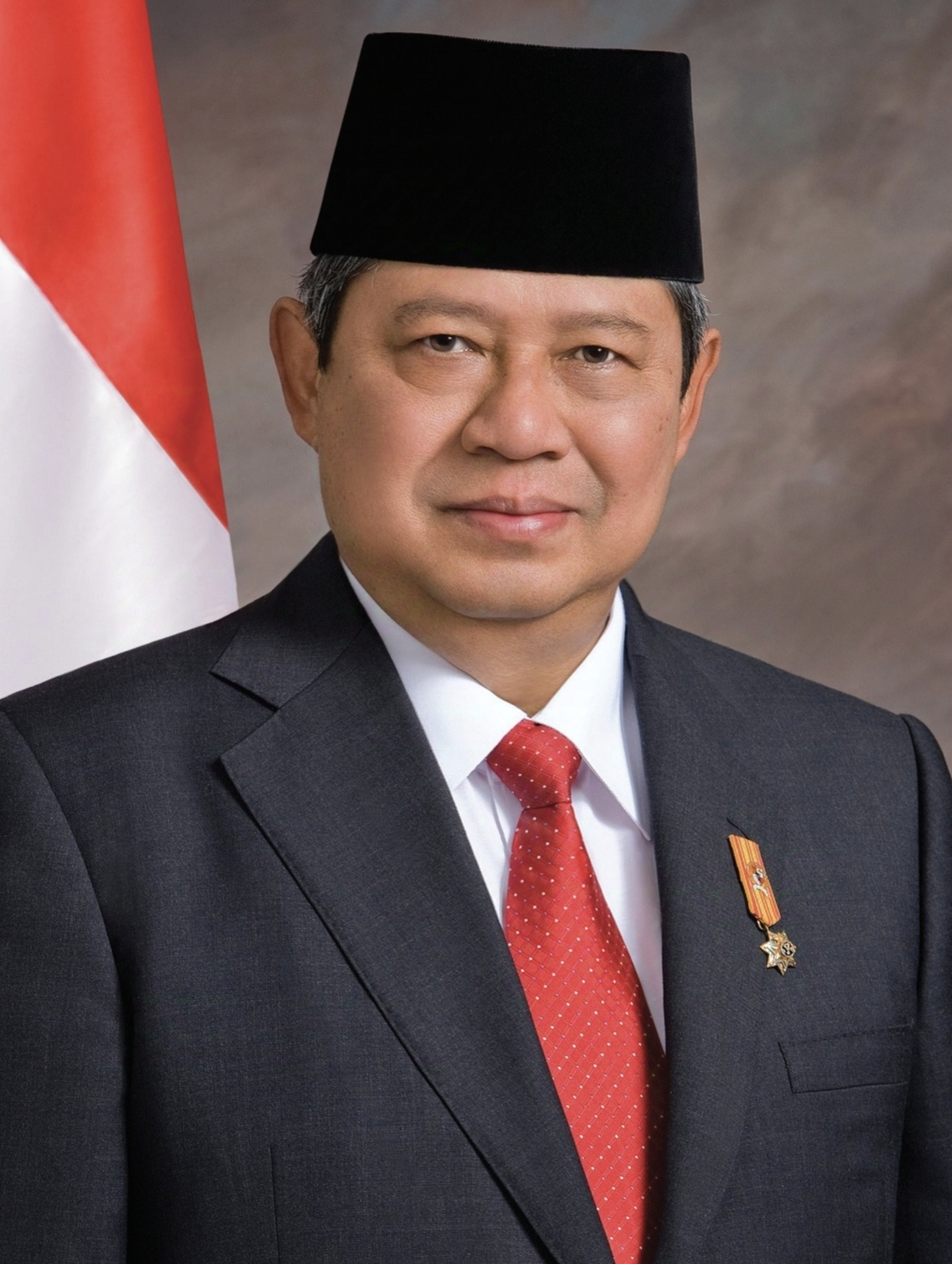
- Official portrait, 2009

6th President of Indonesia
- In office 20 October 2004 – 20 October 2014
- Vice President: Jusuf Kalla (2004–2009); Boediono (2009–2014)
- Preceded by: Megawati Sukarnoputri
- Succeeded by: Joko Widodo

Coordinating Minister for Political, Social, and Security Affairs
- In office 10 August 2001 – 12 March 2004
- President: Megawati Sukarnoputri
- Preceded by: Agum Gumelar
- Succeeded by: Hari Sabarno (acting); Widodo Adi Sutjipto
- In office 23 August 2000 – 1 June 2001
- President: Abdurrahman Wahid
- Preceded by: Soerjadi Soedirdja
- Succeeded by: Agum Gumelar

Minister of Mining and Energy
- In office 29 October 1999 – 23 August 2000
- President: Abdurrahman Wahid
- Preceded by: Kuntoro Mangkusubroto
- Succeeded by: Purnomo Yusgiantoro

Commander of Kodam II/Sriwijaya
- In office 23 August 1996 – 7 August 1997
- President: Suharto
- Preceded by: Karyono
- Succeeded by: Suadi Atma

Chairman of the Democratic Party
- In office 30 March 2013 – 15 March 2020
- Preceded by: Anas Urbaningrum
- Succeeded by: Agus Harimurti Yudhoyono

Personal details
- Born: 9 September 1949 (age 77) Patjitan, East Java, Indonesia
- Party: Demokrat
- Height: 177 cm (5 ft 10 in) (2020); 175 cm (5 ft 9 in) (2000)
- Spouse: Kristiani Herrawati (m. 1976; died 2019)
- Children: Agus; Edhie
- Parents: Raden Soekotjo (father); Siti Habibah (mother)
- Relatives: Sarwo Edhie Wibowo (father-in-law); Pramono Edhie Wibowo (brother-in-law)
- Education: Indonesian Military Academy; United States Army Command and General Staff College; Webster University (MA); Bogor Agricultural University (PhD)
- Occupation: Politician; military officer; artist
- Website: theyudhoyonoinstitute.org
- Nicknames: SBY; Thinking General

Military service
- Branch/service: Indonesian Army
- Years of service: 1973–2000
- Rank: General (honorary)
- Unit: Infantry (Kostrad)
- Commands: Kodam II/Sriwijaya
- Battles/wars: Insurgency in East Timor; Insurgency in Aceh; Bosnian War; Garuda Contingent XIV
- Awards: Tri Sakti Wiratama; Adhi Makayasa
- Service no.: 25308
- Susilo Bambang Yudhoyono's voice Yudhoyono speaking on the downing of Malaysia Airlines Flight 17 over Ukraine; Recorded 18 July 2014

Susilo Bambang Yudhoyono (Indonesian: [suˌsilɔ ˌbambaŋ juɖɔˈjɔnɔ]; born 9 September 1949), commonly referred to as SBY (Indonesian: [ɛsˈbeje]), is an Indonesian politician and retired military officer who served as the sixth president of Indonesia from 2004 to 2014 and the second president from the military after Suharto. He founded the Democratic Party of Indonesia and served as its 4th chairman from 2014 until 2020. He also served as the 8th and 10th Coordinating Minister for Political and Security Affairs from 2000 until 2001 and again from 2001 until 2004. He also served as the president of the Assembly and chair of the Council of the Global Green Growth Institute.

Yudhoyono won the 2004 presidential election—the first direct presidential election in Indonesia, defeating incumbent President Megawati Sukarnoputri. He was sworn into office on 20 October 2004, together with Jusuf Kalla as Vice President. He ran for re-election in 2009 with Boediono as his running mate, and won with an outright majority of the votes in the first round of balloting; he was sworn in for a second term on 20 October 2009.

During his tenure as president, Indonesia participated in many world peace missions, both at the national and international levels. Yudhoyono successfully negotiated a deal that ended the Aceh insurgency, an insurgency which lasted from 1976 to 2005. As a result, he was given the title "Father of Peace." Yudhoyono also chaired the 18th and 19th ASEAN Summits in 2011 and was awarded the Lifetime Achievement Award (Champions of the Earth) in 2014.

== Name ==
The name Susilo Bambang Yudhoyono is of Javanese origins, with Sanskrit roots. Susilo comes from the words su-, meaning "good" and -sila, meaning "behaviour, conduct, or moral." Bambang is a traditional male name in Javanese, meaning "knight," while Yudhoyono comes from the words yuddha, meaning "battle, fight"; and yana, meaning "journey." Thus his full name roughly translates to "well behaved knight on a war mission."

The name "Yudhoyono" is not an inherited surname; most Javanese do not have surnames. Rather, he chose it for his military name-tag, and it is how he is referred to abroad. His children and grandchildren go by the name "Yudhoyono," and in formal meetings and functions he is addressed as Dr. Yudhoyono. In Indonesia, he is usually referred to and widely known as "SBY."

== Early life and education ==
=== Early life and family ===
Susilo Bambang Yudhoyono was born on 9 September 1949, in Tremas, a village in Arjosari, Pacitan Regency, East Java, to a lower-middle-class family. His father was a Javanese man named Raden Soekotjo (1925 – 4 August 2001), whose lineage can be traced to Hamengkubuwono II, while his mother was a Javanese woman named Siti Habibah (30 June 1932 – 30 August 2019).

=== Education ===
Yudhoyono had wanted to join the army since he was a child. In school, he developed a reputation as an academic achiever, excelling in writing poems, short stories, and play-acting. Yudhoyono was also talented in music and sport, reflected when he and his friends established a volleyball club called Klub Rajawali and a band called Gaya Teruna.

When he was in fifth grade, Yudhoyono visited the Indonesian Armed Forces Academy (AKABRI). After seeing the soldiers training there and perhaps inspired by his own father's career, Yudhoyono became determined to join the Indonesian Armed Forces and become a soldier. Yudhoyono planned to enlist after graduating from high school in 1968; however, he missed the registration period.

Young Yudhoyono then became a student under the Department of Mechanical Engineering at the Sepuluh Nopember Institute of Technology (ITS) in Surabaya before entering the Vocational Education Development Center in Malang, East Java. There, he was able to prepare everything for the next phase of his education at the military academy AKABRI. Yudhoyono officially entered AKABRI in 1970 after passing the test in Bandung.

Yudhoyono also studied in the United States, where he received his master's degree in Business Management from Webster University in 1991. He subsequently earned PhD in agricultural economics from the Bogor Agricultural University on 3 October 2004, two days before his presidential victory was announced. He was also awarded two honorary doctorates in 2005 in the fields, respectively, of law from his alma mater, Webster University, and in political science from Thammasat University in Thailand. On 12 June 2014, he earned professor degree from Defense University of Indonesia in National Defense Science.

== Military service ==
=== Military academy ===
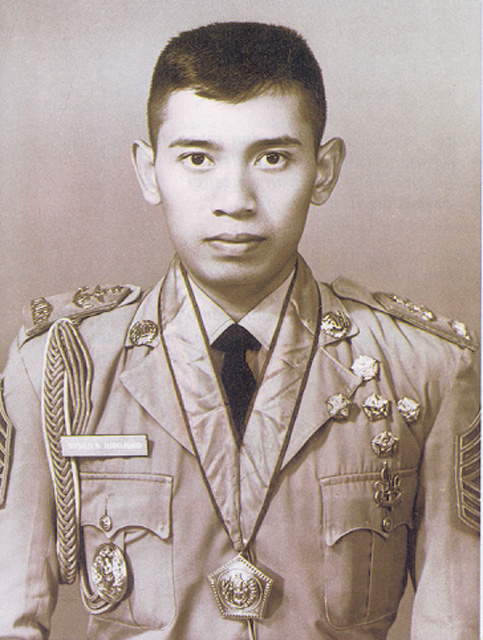
Cadet First Sergeant Major (Sersan Mayor Satu Taruna) Yudhoyono, 1973

Yudhoyono spent three years at AKABRI and became the commander of the Cadet Corps Division there. He graduated from AKABRI as second lieutenant in 1973, and as the best graduate of the year, received the prestigious Adhi Makayasa medal from President Suharto.

=== Kostrad ===
After graduating, Yudhoyono joined the Army Strategic Reserve (Kostrad) and became a platoon commander in the 330th Airborne Battalion. Aside from leading his troops, Yudhoyono was also tasked with giving the battalion soldiers lessons on general knowledge and English. Yudhoyono's proficiency in English was one of the reasons why he was sent to the United States to undertake the Airborne and Ranger Courses at Fort Benning in 1975.

Yudhoyono returned to Indonesia in 1976, where he became a platoon commander in the 305th Battalion and was assigned to Indonesian-occupied East Timor. Yudhoyono had several tours of duty and, like many other Indonesian officers involved in the occupation of East Timor, was accused of committing war crimes. However, Yudhoyono has never been charged with any specific act. From East Timor, Yudhoyono became a mortar platoon commander in 1977, an operations officer for an airborne brigade from 1977 to 1978, and a company commander at Kostrad from 1979 to 1981. Yudhoyono then spent 1981 and 1982 working at the Army headquarters.

While working at the Army headquarters, Yudhoyono was sent to the United States again, this time to participate in the Infantry Officer Advanced Course at Fort Benning and in training with the 82nd Airborne Division. Yudhoyono also spent time in Panama and went through the jungle warfare school. When Yudhoyono returned in 1983, he was made commander of the Infantry Trainers' School. It was not long before he was abroad again, this time to Belgium and West Germany, to undertake the Antitank weapons Course. In 1985, Yudhoyono also took a Battalion Commando Course in Malaysia.

From 1986 to 1988, Yudhoyono served with Kodam IX/Udayana, which covers Bali and the Lesser Sunda Islands. Yudhoyono was a battalion commander from 1986 to 1988 and was part of the operational staff in 1988. In 1989, Yudhoyono became a lecturer at the Army Staff College (Seskoad) and delivered a presentation entitled "ABRI's Professionalism at the Present and in the Future". Together with Agus Wirahadikusumah, Yudhoyono published a book entitled "The Challenges of Development".

Whilst at Seskoad, Yudhoyono also took the opportunity to further his own military education. He went to the US Army Command and General Staff College at Fort Leavenworth, Kansas. While in the United States, he took the opportunity to obtain an MA degree in business management from Webster University in 1991.

In 1992, Yudhoyono was transferred to the Army Information Department and worked as a speechwriter for General Edi Sudrajat, the Army chief of staff. In 1993, when Edi became commander of the Military of Indonesia (ABRI), Yudhoyono joined Edi's personal staff. Edi did not last long as ABRI commander and Yudhoyono was then transferred back to Kostrad where he became a brigade commander. A year later, Yudhoyono was the operations assistant at Jaya (Jakarta) Military Area Command before taking command IV/Diponegoro Military Area Command in Central Java. Yudhoyono had one more stint overseas when he became Indonesia's chief military observer of the United Nation Peacekeeping Force in Bosnia in 1995–96.

When Yudhoyono returned to Indonesia, he was made KODAM Jaya chief of staff before being appointed as KODAM II/Sriwijaya commander. In this position, Yudhoyono was responsible for military operations in southern Sumatra. He served in this position until 1997, when he was appointed chief of staff for social-political affairs. At the same time, he was also appointed chairman of the ABRI Faction in the People's Consultative Assembly General Session and participated in Suharto's election to a seventh term as president.

=== Chairman of the ABRI faction ===
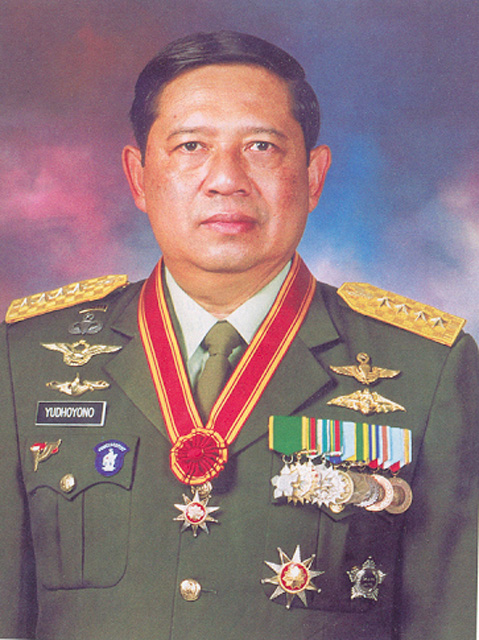
General Susilo Bambang Yudhoyono in official military portrait, 2000

In 1997, he was appointed a member of parliament and became the Chief of Territorial Staff (Kaster) of the Indonesian National Armed Forces (TNI), while also serving as the spokesman for the ABRI faction before the MPR General Session in March 1998.

In the days leading up to Suharto's resignation in May 1998, Yudhoyono and pro-reform ABRI officers held meetings and discussions with Nurcholish Madjid, a pro-reform secular Muslim leader. In their discussions, Yudhoyono accepted that Suharto should resign, but like the ABRI officers who attended his meetings, he was reluctant to publicly withdraw their support for Suharto, let alone call for Suharto's resignation. Nevertheless, the pressure eventually became too much for Suharto, who resigned on May 21, 1998.

As Indonesia entered the reform era, ABRI's popularity, due to its association with Suharto, was at an all-time low. To reduce the political role of ABRI, Yudhoyono's chief of staff for socio-political affairs in parliament was renamed chief of staff for territorial affairs and in 1999, ABRI was renamed TNI and the Indonesian National Police (Polri) was separated. At this time, Yudhoyono's popularity began to rise as he offered ideas and concepts for reforming the military and the state. He did this by combining the strong reformist sentiment at the time with the TNI's concern for security and stability.

Due to his high education (completing his doctorate during the presidential election) and his well-planned maneuvers, Yudhoyono was known as the "thinking general.

== Political career ==
=== Wahid presidency ===
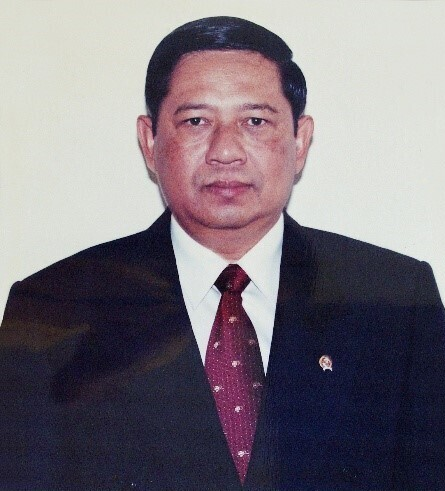
Yudhoyono's official portrait as minister of mining and energy, 1999

Yudhoyono was appointed mining and energy minister in the cabinet of President Abdurrahman Wahid in 1999. According to General Wiranto, who assisted Wahid in the formation of the Cabinet, he had recommended to the president that Yudhoyono would do better as Army chief of staff. However, Wahid rejected the idea and Yudhoyono became the minister of mining and energy instead. At the same time, Yudhoyono ended his military career with the rank of lieutenant general, although he would be made honorary general in 2000.

Yudhoyono's popularity grew, even as minister of mining and energy. In June 2000, there were rumours that Wahid, because of his lack of skill as an administrator was going to appoint a first minister to look after the day-to-day running of the government. Yudhoyono's name appeared as a potential candidate for the position, although eventually Wahid appointed Vice President Megawati Sukarnoputri as the day to day administrator.

In August 2000, after a cabinet reshuffle, Yudhoyono became the coordinating minister for politic and security affairs. One of his tasks was to separate the army from politics. This was in line with his reformist ideas on the future of Indonesian military, and is a view he has held since his days in an army policy centre. He said at that time:

Since 1998, the military has decided to stay out of day-to-day politics. The basic idea of military reform is to go back to the role and function of the military as a defense force and move them away from politics systematically. The trend is moving in such a way that there is no so-called 'dual function' of the military, there is no so-called social political mission in the military.

Another task that Yudhoyono was given was as an intermediary between Wahid and the Suharto family. At the time, Wahid was trying to make Suharto hand back all the money which he had allegedly obtained through corruption when he was president. Yudhoyono was sent by Wahid to convey this wish and to negotiate with the former first family. However, Yudhoyono was not successful in this venture.

At the beginning of 2001, with political pressure increasing on him, Wahid ordered Yudhoyono to form a crisis centre with Yudhoyono as chairman The purpose of this crisis centre was to assist the president in giving policy advice and was headquartered at Yudhoyono's office. It seemed as if because of this appointment, Yudhoyono could be considered one of Wahid's men, however Yudhoyono would break ranks from Wahid in July 2001 when the latter was facing impeachment. In desperation, Wahid issued a decree freezing the People's Representative Council (DPR) and then asked Yudhoyono to declare a state of emergency to further strengthen his position. Yudhoyono refused to accept this, and Wahid dismissed him.

=== Megawati presidency ===
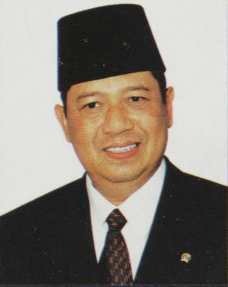
Yudhoyono's official portrait as coordinating minister of political, social, and security affairs, 1999

On 23 July 2001, in a special session, the MPR impeached Wahid and replaced him with Megawati as president. A few days later when the MPR assembled to elect a new vice president, Yudhoyono ran for the office, competing against Akbar Tanjung of the Golkar Party and Hamzah Haz of the United Development Party (PPP). Yudhoyono and Akbar lost out to Hamzah Haz who became the new vice president.

Yudhoyono was appointed to his old position of coordinating minister of political and security affairs in Megawati's new cabinet. After the Bali bombings in October 2002, he oversaw the hunt for and arrest of those responsible, and gained a reputation both in Indonesia and abroad as one of the few Indonesian politicians who was serious about the war on terrorism. His speech during the first anniversary of the Bali bombings (in which many Australians were killed) was praised by the Australian media and public.

Yudhoyono also dealt with the Free Aceh Movement (GAM), a separatist movement wanting to separate the Province of Aceh from Indonesia. On May 19, 2003, President Megawati declared a state of military emergency in Aceh, a measure that was subsequently extended in November.

=== Democratic Party ===
Democratic Party

Yudhoyono's supporters saw Yudhoyono's participation in the vice-presidential election as a sign of his popularity and recognised Yudhoyono's potential as a possible leader for Indonesia. One of these supporters, Vence Rumangkang approached Yudhoyono with the idea of forming a political party to help shore up support for the 2004 presidential elections. Yudhoyono approved of the idea and after going through the basic concepts, left Rumangkang in charge of forming the Party.

From 12 to 19 August 2001, Rumangkang began holding a series of meetings to discuss the formation of the party while holding consultations with Yudhoyono. Yudhoyono personally led the meetings on 19 and 20 August 2001, and the basic outline of the Democratic Party was finalised. On 9 September 2001, the formation of the party was officially declared, and it was registered at the Ministry of Justice and Human Rights on 10 September. The organizers behind Democratic Party's formation went to extreme lengths to make sure that PD was Yudhoyono's personal political party. The declaration of its formation was 9 September 2001, which was Yudhoyono's birthday, and the Party originally had 99 members.

=== Road to presidency ===
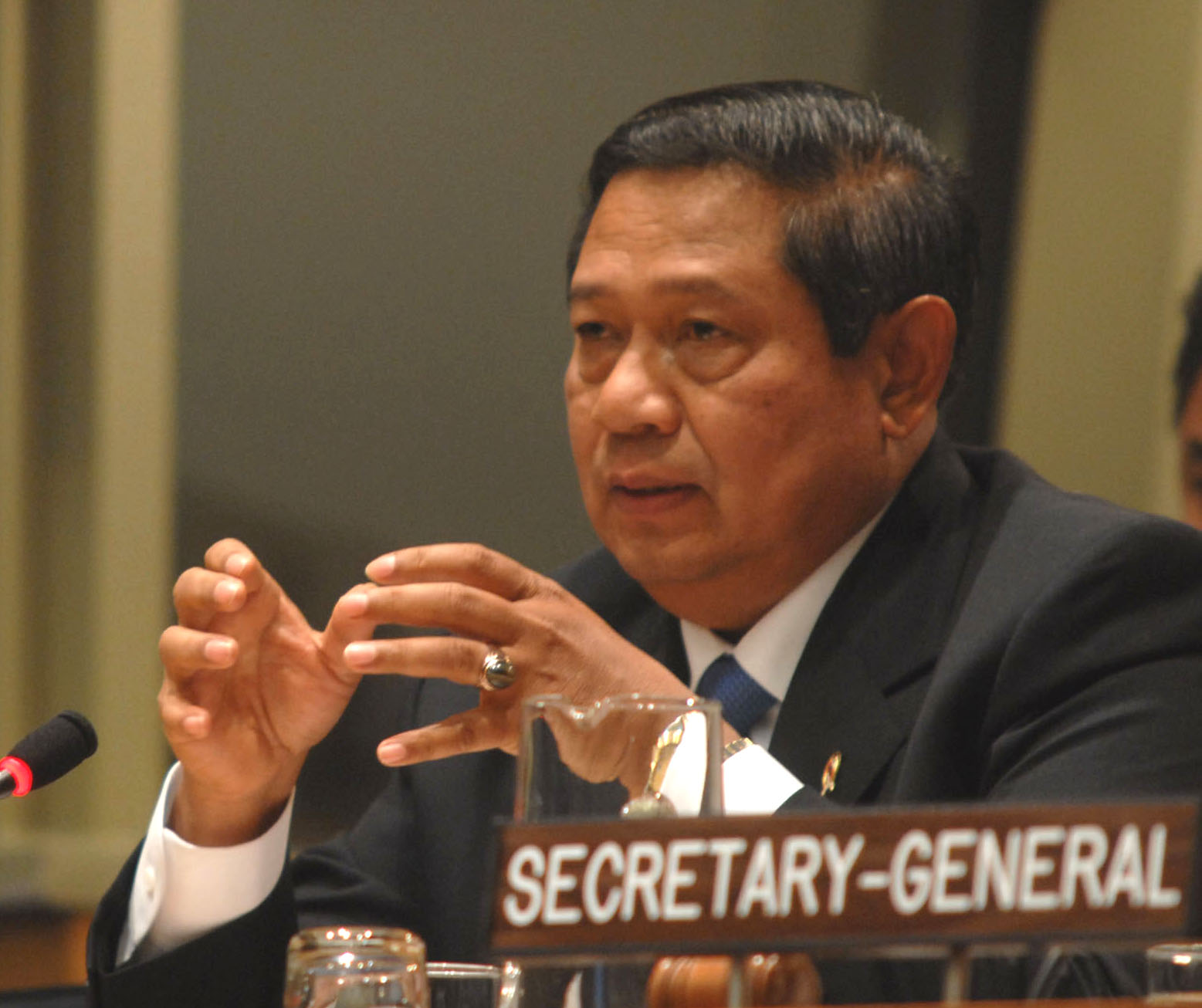
Yudhoyono in the United Nations

The United Democratic Nationhood Party (PPDK) was the first to bring up the subject of nomination. In September 2003, Yudhoyono's own party began to make preparations in case Yudhoyono was willing to accept a presidential nomination. The Democratic Party then initiated a publicity campaign to promote Yudhoyono as a candidate. For his part, Yudhoyono was not responsive to both PPDK and the Democratic Party's manoeuvrings to nominate him and continued his duties as minister. PPDK was disappointed in Yudhoyono's reaction, and the Democratic Party continued to wait for Yudhoyono to resign his position, as was expected of all presidential candidates apart from the incumbent president and vice president.

The turning point came on 1 March 2004, when Yudhoyono's secretary, Sudi Silalahi announced to the media that for the last six months, Yudhoyono had been excluded from policy decision-making in the field of politics and security. On 2 March 2004, Megawati responded that she had never excluded Yudhoyono, while her husband, Taufiq Kiemas called Yudhoyono childish for complaining to the media instead of the president herself. On 8 March 2004, Yudhoyono sent a letter asking for permission to meet the president about his ministerial authority. Megawati did not respond when she received the letter, although she invited Yudhoyono along to a cabinet meeting on 11 March 2004. Yudhoyono did not attend the cabinet meeting and instead held a press conference at his office and announced his resignation from the position of coordinating minister of political and security affairs. He also announced that he was ready to be nominated as a presidential candidate.

Yudhoyono's popularity skyrocketed after his falling out with Megawati as he was seen by the people as the underdog. However this popularity did not translate to a victory for the Democratic Party at the 2004 legislative elections. The party won 7.5% of the votes, which was still enough to nominate Yudhoyono as a presidential candidate. Yudhoyono accepted the nomination and picked Golkar's Jusuf Kalla as his running mate. Aside from the Democratic Party, their presidential and vice-presidential candidacy was supported by the Crescent Star Party (PBB), the Reform Star Party (PBR) and the Indonesian Justice and Unity Party (PKPI).

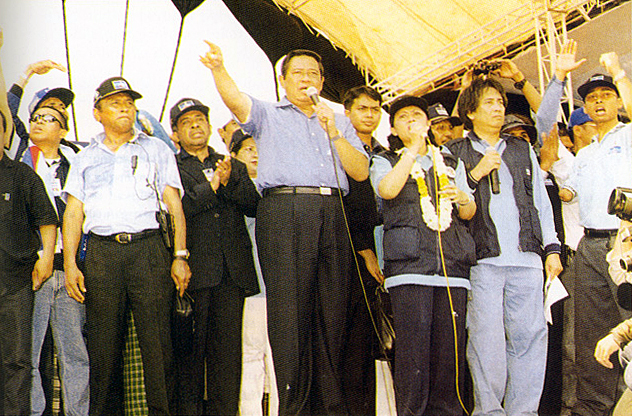
The rapid rise of Yudhoyono's (centre) popularity helped the Democratic Party garner 7.45% of votes during the April 2004 legislative election.

Yudhoyono's manifesto for the future of Indonesia, summarised in a book titled Vision For Change written by him and distributed for free during the campaign, was built on four pillars: prosperity, peace, justice and democracy. At the top of his agenda was a plan for increasing economic prosperity, aiming for economic growth of at least 7% and a revival of small and medium-sized enterprises. He also put forward policies to offer better credit lines, to cut red tape, improve labour laws and to root out corruption from the top down. He told an interviewer:

If we are to reduce poverty, create jobs, increase purchasing power and rebuild infrastructure, then we will need new capital. Of course, to be able to invite investment, I have to improve the climate – legal certainties, political stability, law and order, sound tax policies, customs policies, good labor management. I will improve the guarantees to encourage investors to come to Indonesia.

Yudhoyono's perceived communication skills made him the front-runner throughout the election campaign, according to many opinion polls and the opinions of election commentators, ahead of the other candidates (Megawati, Wiranto, Amien Rais, and Hamzah). On 5 July 2004, Yudhoyono participated in the first round of the presidential election, coming first with 33% of the votes. However, 50% of votes were required for a new president and vice president to be elected, and this meant Yudhoyono going into a run-off against Megawati.

In the run-off, Yudhoyono faced a challenge from Megawati's Indonesian Democratic Party-Struggle (PDI-P), forming a national coalition with Golkar, the PPP, Prosperous Peace Party (PDS) and the Indonesian National Party (PNI). Yudhoyono then declared that his coalition, which now received political support from the National Awakening Party (PKB), the Prosperous Justice Party (PKS) and the National Mandate Party (PAN), would be the people's coalition. On 20 September 2004, Yudhoyono participated in the run-off election, winning it with 60.87% of the vote. Yudhoyono was inaugurated as president on 20 October 2004. In February 2010, SBY was named as the political figure who had achieved The Gold Standard in Political Communications on YouTube by the influential Public Affairs Asia network and magazine.

== Presidency (2004–2014) ==
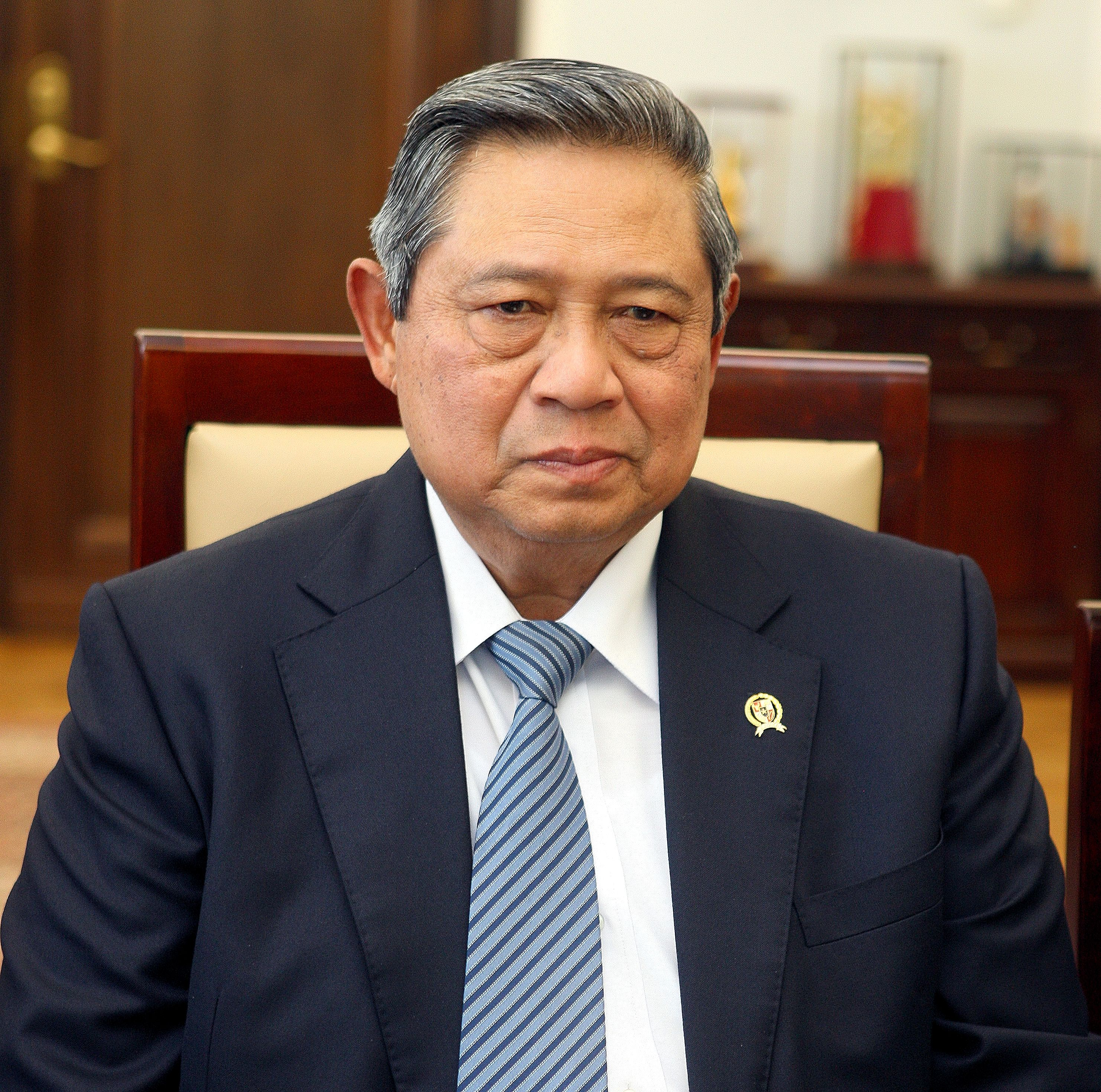
- Presidency of Susilo Bambang Yudhoyono; 20 October 2004 – 20 October 2014
- Cabinet: First Yudhoyono Cabinet; Second Yudhoyono Cabinet
- Party: Democratic
- Election: 2004; 2009
- Seat: Istana Negara
- Seal of the President of Indonesia

=== Government and cabinets ===
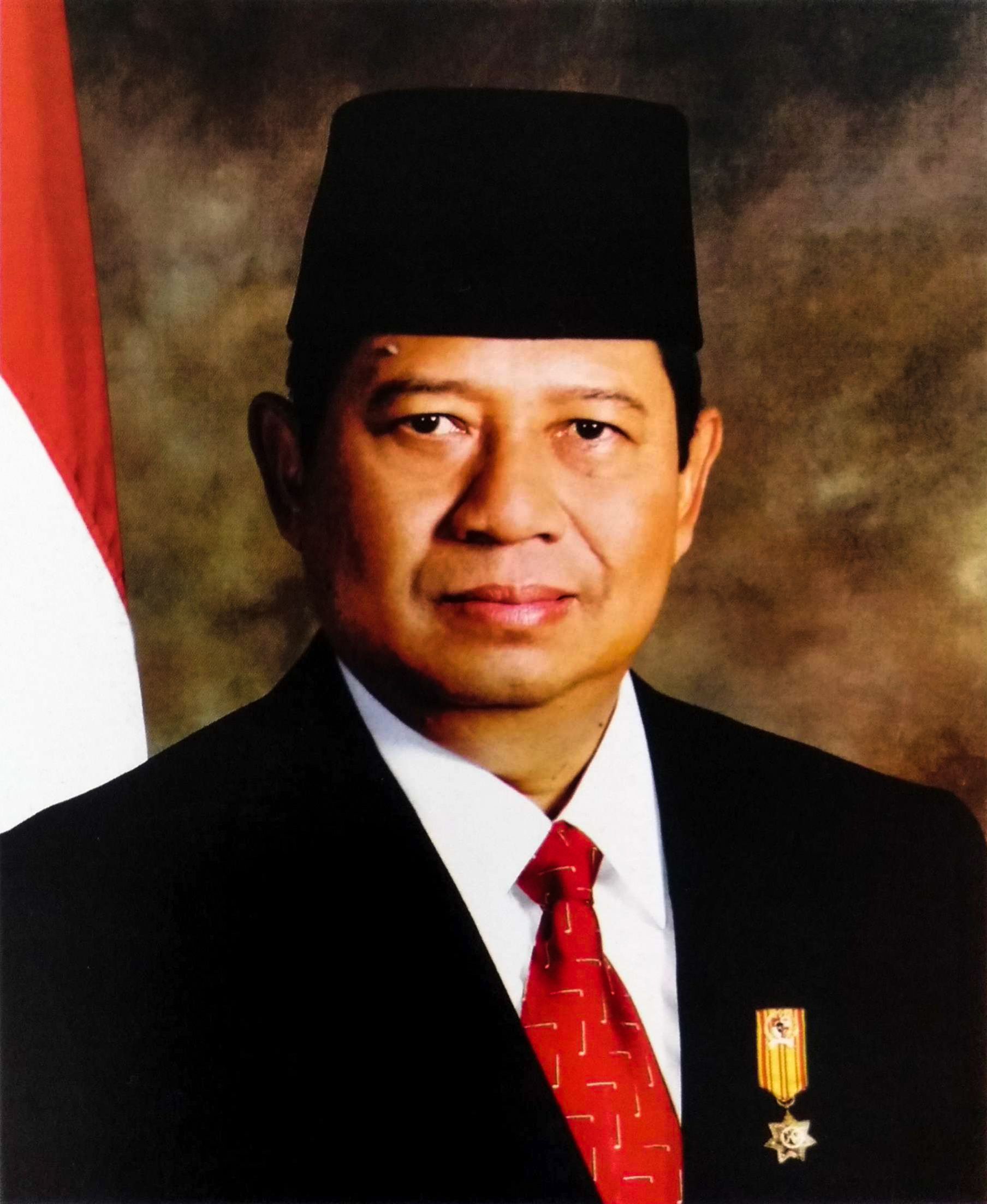
Yudhoyono's portrait at the beginning of his first term, 2004

On the day of his inauguration in 2004, Yudhoyono announced his new cabinet, which would be known as the United Indonesia Cabinet (Kabinet Indonesia Bersatu). Consisting of 36 ministers, it included members of the Democratic Party, Golkar and the PPP, PBB, PKB, PAN, PKP, and PKS. Professionals were also named in the cabinet, most of them taking on ministries in the economic field. The military were also included, with five former members appointed to the cabinet. As Yudhoyono's promised during the election, four of the cabinet appointees were female. Yudhoyono's Second United Indonesia Cabinet was announced in October 2009 after he was re-elected as president earlier in the year. The vice president in Yudhoyono's second cabinet was Boediono, who replaced Jusuf Kalla, Yudhoyono's vice president in his first cabinet.

The process of selecting cabinet members under his administration was highly selective distinct from previous administrations as he prioritized integrity, capacity, experience, knowledge, and acceptability. He sought to ensure that his cabinet members, who serve as his primary aides, would be capable of working effectively. Furthermore, the backgrounds of prospective ministers were vetted through a review of their legal records, conducted by the Corruption Eradication Commission (KPK) and the police, to ensure there were no flaws in the selection process.

=== Balance of political power with Kalla ===
Although he had won the presidency, Yudhoyono was still weak in the Indonesian parliament, the House of Representatives (DPR). The Democratic Party, even combined with all of its coalition partners, had far fewer representatives than Golkar and the PDI-P, which played the role of opposition. With a national congress to be held in December 2004, Yudhoyono and Kalla had originally backed Agung Laksono speaker to become Golkar chairman. When Agung was perceived to be too weak to run against Akbar Tandjung, Yudhoyono and Kalla threw their weight behind Surya Paloh. Finally, when Paloh was perceived to be too weak to run against Akbar, Yudhoyono gave the green light for Kalla to run for the Golkar Chairmanship. On 19 December 2004, Kalla was elected as the new chairman of Golkar. Kalla's victory posed a dilemma for Yudhoyono. Although it now enabled Yudhoyono to pass legislation, Kalla's new position meant that he was now more powerful than Yudhoyono in terms of influence in parliament.

After the 2004 Indian Ocean tsunami Kalla, apparently on his own initiative, assembled Ministers and signed a vice-presidential decree ordering work to begin on rehabilitating Aceh. The legality of his vice-presidential decree was questioned although Yudhoyono maintained that it was he who gave the orders for Kalla to proceed.

In September 2005, when Yudhoyono went to New York City to attend the annual United Nations Summit, he left Vice President Kalla in charge. Yudhoyono held a video conference from New York to receive reports from ministers. Critics suggest that this was an expression of distrust by Yudhoyono. The suggestion seemed to gain momentum when Kalla only showed up for one video conference and then spent the rest of the time taking care of Golkar matters.

To defuse political tensions stemming from protests over rising fuel prices, President Yudhoyono dispatched Vice President Jusuf Kalla to meet with several national figures, including former President Abdurrahman Wahid and Megawati Sukarnoputri. Vice President Kalla's arrival at the residence of former President Abdurrahman Wahid in Ciganjur, Jakarta, was greeted by Yenny Wahid, Gus Dur's eldest daughter, on the porch. Kalla, wearing a long-sleeved batik shirt, immediately entered the living room where Gus Dur was waiting. After shaking hands and hugging, Kalla sat on a long chair to Gus Dur's left with Ibu Mufidah. Meanwhile, Ibu Sinta Nuriyah sat beside Yenny Wahid. The conversation immediately became warm, interspersed with Gus Dur's characteristic jokes. Vice President Kalla was also welcomed at the home of former President Megawati Sukarnoputri by her husband, Taufiq Kiemas, and her eldest daughter, Puan Maharani. The two leaders engaged in a relaxed conversation, with Megawati briefly discussing food. Meanwhile, the Vice President responded in a friendly manner, resulting in very warm communication. The meeting, which lasted approximately 15 minutes, gave the impression that there had never been any differences between the two leaders

President Yudhoyono's first term was relatively stable due to his strategy of maintaining balance, but in his second term, when he chose a civil bureaucrat as his vice president, political attacks began to emerge that shook his government.

=== Dealings with Suharto ===
On 6 May 2005, Yudhoyono visited Suharto at hospital when the latter suffered from intestinal bleeding. On 5 January 2007, Yudhoyono and his wife visited Suharto, who was again hospitalised due to anaemia as well as heart and kidney problems. After the visit, Yudhoyono made an appeal to all Indonesians to pray for Suharto's recovery.

Responding to some public requests for Suharto to be granted a pardon for possible past mistakes in governing Indonesia, presidential spokesperson Andi Mallarangeng said, "A visit from an incumbent president to a hospitalized former president is something normal. However, this show of humanity and legal steps are two different things."

=== Foreign policy ===
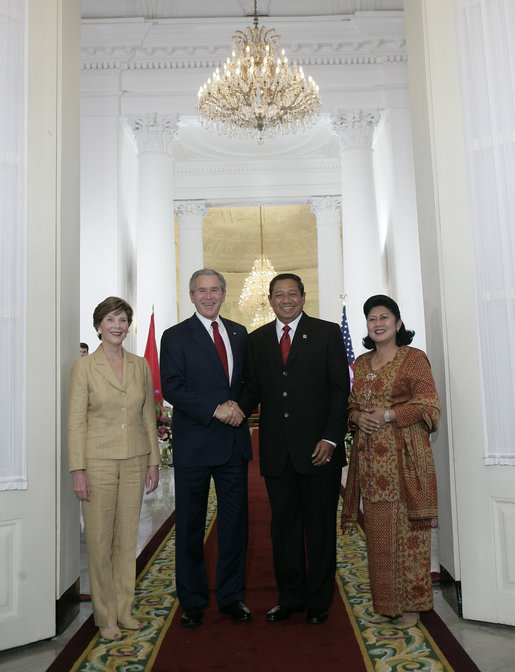
President Yudhoyono and his wife Ani Yudhoyono greeting US President George W. Bush and his wife Laura Bush at Bogor Palace, November 2006

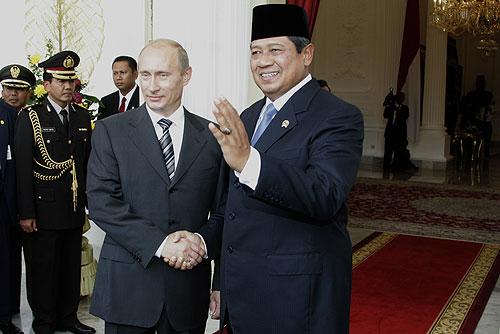
Yudhoyono meeting Russian President Vladimir Putin to sign a defence deal in Jakarta, September 2007

President Yudhoyono's foreign policy sought to create new breakthroughs for the strategic development of Indonesia's defense, namely ending the US military embargo, which was aided by support from Washington. The Bush administration claimed that ending the arms embargo and modernizing the Indonesian Defence Force will help Jakarta address mutual security concerns such as terrorism, maritime piracy, narcotics trafficking, pandemic disease, and disaster relief. Undersecretary of State for Political Affairs Nicholas Burns said that Indonesia, as "the world's largest Muslim state and its third-largest democracy, is a voice of moderation in the Islamic world and plays a unique strategic role in Southeast Asia".

In February 2005, the US government reinstated Indonesia's eligibility for the International Military Education and Training program in order to upgrade the quality of its officer corps. In May 2005, it removed restrictions on nonlethal defense equipment such as communications and transport systems. This lifted the last remaining barrier, a ban on sale of lethal weaponry and related equipment. Still recovering from the Asian financial crisis, the Indonesian government lacked the funds to purchase new armaments but took advantage of the new rules to purchase spare parts for its aging fleet of 10 U.S.-supplied F-16 fighters. Invoking these accomplishments at the APEC conference, President Yudhoyono argued that Indonesia had proven itself worthy of resumed military engagement with the United States. While there, he also spoke with Russian President Vladimir Putin about further defence cooperation with Moscow following the 2003 purchase of four Sukhoi warplanes and two MI-35 assault helicopters.n addition to the United States and Russia, Yudhoyono considered purchasing weapons from other potential suppliers, which included several European Union countries, South Korea, India, and China.

President Yudhoyono also succeeded in strengthening relations with Russia, which was marked by the visit of President Vladimir Putin in 2007, which was the second visit in 47 years by the leader of the Soviet Union to Indonesia.

After the collapse of the New Order, relations between Indonesia and Pacific countries received less attention from Indonesian leaders. Only after President Yudhoyono was elected did he begin to focus Indonesian foreign policy on the Pacific islands. In 2010, President Yudhoyono visited Australia and addressed the Australian parliament. He also succeeded in renewing defence and security cooperation with Australia by including the principle of recognizing Indonesia's territorial integrity in the Lombok Treaty. He also made a historic visit to Papua New Guinea following President Suharto's visit some 31 years earlier, where he spoke about the importance of strategic cooperation between the two countries in various fields. The improving relationship between Indonesia and Papua New Guinea is also reflected in mutual support for Indonesia's role in the Melanesian Spearhead Group (MSG), the Pacific Islands Forum, and Papua New Guinea's role in ASEAN. In 2014, he also became the first Indonesian president to visit the Pacific island nation of Fiji and address the Pacific Islands Forum.

=== Aceh Peace Agreement ===
During his leadership, President Yudhoyono achieved many important achievements, especially related to domestic stability. The Indonesian government succeeded in reaching a peace agreement with the Free Aceh Movement (GAM). The memorandum of understanding was signed in Helsinki, Finland, on August 15, 2005.

The conflict that has been going on for almost thirty years was initially a form of dissatisfaction with the socio-economic inequality that occurred in Aceh, especially during the New Order era. Resistance to the New Order government has turned into an armed conflict that has claimed thousands of lives. GAM has an army that conducts guerrilla warfare that disrupts national stability. Various efforts have been made by the government from time to time, but GAM continues to exist.

Peace negotiations between GAM and the Indonesian government initially began at the beginning of the reform era but were interrupted by the imposition of martial law in Aceh, which stemmed from misunderstandings between the two sides Then the negotiations were restarted during the Yudhoyono administration, the Indonesian government's chief negotiator, Mr. Awaludin, explained why the peace process in Aceh was successful from his perspective as the Indonesian government's chief negotiator during the Helsinki Agreement. The government began the peace negotiations with a clear action plan and reasonable offers, including an amnesty for the Free Aceh Movement (GAM) and a clear and concrete social, political and economic justice program.

President Yudhoyono succeeded in convincing the military, parliament and the international community to actively participate in monitoring and safeguarding the Aceh peace process, as he had already been actively involved in negotiations since 2000 when he served as Minister of Politics and Security and also important factors, especially the 2004 tsunami disaster, which encouraged both sides to focus more on helping victims than fighting, and international pressure on GAM to enter the negotiations. Ultimately, the sincerity of both sides commitment to dialogue proved decisive.

=== Law enforcement, reconciliation and exemplary leaders ===
In the area of law enforcement, President Yudhoyono's administration has made a number of breakthroughs in Indonesia's law enforcement culture. The president has sought to make law enforcement in Indonesia, particularly during his administration, more authoritative. In 2005, former Bank Indonesia deputy chairman Aulia Pohan, who was also the father-in-law of his son Agus Harimurti, was arrested by the Corruption Eradication Commission (KPK), this was the first case involving a relative of a leader in this country. He also tried to prioritize a culture of legal order, for example, the Corruption Court Law and the Juvenile Court Law. He also did not hesitate to dismiss ministers suspected of corruption, even though the minister was his former spokesman and came from the same party as him. The dismissal of an active minister suspected of corruption and already a corruption suspect was the first case in Indonesia of an active minister being a corruption suspect.

In 2005, President Yudhoyono visited Timor Leste his first visit to the country. During the trip, he visited the Santa Cruz Cemetery, the site of a bloody clash in 1991. There, he engaged in discussions with Timor Leste’s leadership regarding historical reconciliation to strengthen bilateral relations. The two leaders ultimately agreed to establish the Indonesia Timor Leste Commission of Truth and Friendship in 2005. The commission summoned key figures from both nations who were involved during the period of the referendum. The findings of the commission’s investigation proved effective in helping to heal the wounds of past historical events.

In 2008, the global financial crisis occurred. The Indonesian government, which had already had bitter experience during the Asian financial crisis, tried to be more responsive in handling the crisis, especially during the Yudhoyono presidency. He tried to build togetherness in handling the global financial crisis, with Indonesia actively participating in the G20. Also at that time, he succeeded in maintaining a calm and stable domestic economic condition in handling the crisis with the policy of closing the Indonesian Stock Exchange and providing bailout funds for Bank Century to prevent panic in the financial industry. At last, Indonesia managed to survive the crisis unlike ten years ago, the steps he took were quick and tactical. He also did not forget about law enforcement by supporting the arrest of several people who took personal advantage of the policy, such as the arrest of the President Director of Bank Century and the Deputy Governor of Bank Indonesia.

In 2012, the administration of President Yudhoyono conferred the title of National Hero upon Soekarno and Mohammad Hatta recognizing them individually, following a joint designation as "Proclamation Heroes" in 1986. Additionally, President Yudhoyono, in coordination with the People's Consultative Assembly (MPR), revoked an MPR Decree that had discredited the role of Bung Karno. This gesture represented the highest honor bestowed by a head of state upon Indonesia’s first President and Vice President. In 2014, he also designated May 1st as a national public holiday a significant move, given that the observance of Labor Day had been prohibited during the New Order era.

Towards the end of his term, President Yudhoyono’s administration sought to establish a new tradition: that a democratic political system should not serve personal or group interests, but rather the people. At an event organized by the Indonesian Young Entrepreneurs Association (HIPMI), the President stated:

"I am not a presidential candidate in 2014, my wife and children will not run for president either, and I have never prepared anyone to run for president, let the people and democracy speak for themselves in this election"

— Susilo Bambang Yudhoyono

Previously, rumours circulated about amendments to the 1945 Constitution regarding presidential terms and the possibility of presidential family members running for re-election. The President sought to clear the political air at the time. He also strengthened Indonesia's democratic system by ensuring a smooth and orderly leadership transition.

=== Ensuring Political Stability and Security During the Reformation Era ===
Political and security stability in Indonesia during the early stages of the Reformation era were fraught with challenges, due to numerous political, social, and cultural conflicts. These conflicts also led to rapid changes in government, resulting in political and security instability, further exacerbated by military-civilian rivalries in politics.

During President Yudhoyono's administration, despite his military background, he effectively positioned himself as a mediator, particularly regarding civilian and military supremacy in bureaucratic positions. He maintained a neutral stance and did not appoint military personnel to civilian positions. The early stages of the Reformation era were indeed fraught with turmoil, particularly regarding the military's dual role in politics (Dwifungsi ABRI).

During the 69th Indonesian National Armed Forces (TNI) anniversary celebration, which coincided with the end of his term, President Yudhoyono delivered a speech:

The reform of the Indonesian National Armed Forces (TNI) has now entered its 15th year. Reform in Indonesia began in 1998. The President expressed his gratitude to the TNI soldiers who have played a role in the reform process, ensuring that the TNI has returned to its original identity and function of safeguarding the sovereignty of the Indonesian nation. "I myself actively participated in that difficult reform process," he said.

The challenge of maintaining national security became even more challenging early in his first term as terrorist attacks continued in Indonesia. He was able to maintain security stability through swift and responsive action, stopping terrorist attacks and promptly apprehending the perpetrators. For example, during the terrorist attacks in 2005 and 2009, his administration was able to respond quickly and tactically, ensuring public security and enabling the economy to grow.

=== Economic policy ===
==== Fiscal policy ====
In a meeting with regional heads, President Yudhoyono outlined some of the government's achievements in the economic field

"We should be grateful for the economic achievements that have been made, although there are still some that have not been achieved," he explained. He added that the economic conditions at the beginning of his first term in 2004 were still characterized by low GDP and significant economic growth, as well as minimal infrastructure. He said the process of economic consolidation then began, and social and security conditions became more stable after peaceful and democratic elections. Civil servant salaries remain low, while the health budget remains limited, he added.

During his leadership, state finances were managed effectively. He was able to formulate appropriate fiscal policy strategies with his ministers, who were economists, resulting in more efficient state financial management, particularly regarding grants and foreign debt. He sought to transform misperceptions about state financial management into effective financial management. In his final state address of his term, he stated:

"With great difficulty, the government succeeded in reducing the debt-to-GDP ratio to around 23 percent. During the 1998 monetary crisis, Indonesia's debt-to-GDP ratio reached 85 percent, almost equal to the total income of the Indonesian people. During my inauguration, the debt-to-GDP ratio fell from 56.6 percent in 2004 to 23 percent in 2013. The government also succeeded in reducing foreign grant aid, which is no longer a determining factor in national development, as its portion currently only represents 0.7 percent of the total national budget. However, Indonesia continues to receive grants from friendly countries as long as they are given in good faith".

He indicated that GDP and foreign exchange reserves had increased significantly and the ratio of debt to gross domestic product could be reduced from 56 percent to 23 percent. President Yudhoyono added that Indonesia's debt ratio of 23 percent to GDP was far below that of developed countries such as Germany (86.1 percent), United States (104.1 percent), and United Kingdom ( 107 percent). He said, during the 2004–2014 period, domestic and foreign debt could also be reduced while the state budget was increased fourfold. In 2004, the country's per capita income was recorded at US$1188 but ten years later it rose to US$3490. Indonesia is also recorded as a country with the second highest economic growth rate since 2009 after China with the country's exports increasing threefold. At that time, Indonesia's debt-to-GDP ratio was the lowest among the developed countries in the G20. Unfortunately, this sound state financial management policy was not continued by subsequent presidents.

He also successfully repaid the IMF debt incurred during the 1998 monetary crisis, which was originally due in 2010 but was repaid early in 2006. In 2015, he explained the reason for this early repayment.

The primary reason was to prevent Indonesia from being dictated to by the IMF and donor countries. He explained that by "dictate," he meant that development planning, including the state budget and financial use, did not require the IMF.

In 2012, after successfully paying off its IMF debt, his government also provided a loan to the international donor agency because Indonesia's economy was considered quite strong at that time. In 2007, President Yudhoyono also successfully initiated the dissolution of the Consultative Group on Indonesia (CGI) because he wanted Indonesia to be more independent and less dependent on so many parties. President Yudhoyono stated that

Indonesia no longer needs to discuss development program plans with creditor forums. "Indonesia will do everything by itself without the help of CGI. Because of that, we see that there is no need for a CGI forum anymore," he explained, the CGI dissolution policy had been started since last year. He also emphasized the importance of the Indonesian people to be more independent in planning and implementing development. The dissolution of CGI, he said, demanded Indonesia's full responsibility to determine the budget and meet financial needs.

Established in 1992, the CGI was a consortium of countries and institutions providing loans to Indonesia, set up by the Indonesian government and the World Bank. Its membership was made up of 30 bilateral and multilateral creditors, including the World Bank, the Asian Development Bank, the International Monetary Fund and industrialized countries such as Japan and the United States, as well as many other smaller countries and many other world financial and aid institutions. In 2006 the Consultative Group on Indonesia pledged $5.4 billion in fresh loans and grants for Indonesia. Finance Minister Sri Mulyani said the Consultative Group on Indonesia (CGI) was no longer needed as the country's primary creditors were only the World Bank, the Asian Development Bank (ADB) and Japan, and that Indonesia now preferred one-on-one negotiations rather than round table, multilateral ones. She said the dissolution of the CGI was also of benefit to Indonesia as it freed the government of the need to explain its intentions and plans to many different parties.

==== Economic growth ====
Economic growth
Year	Percent
2005	5,6%
2006	5,5%
2007	6,3%
2008	6%
2009	4,6%
2010	6,2%
2011	6,2%
2012	6%
2013	5,6%
2014	5,2%

The Yudhoyono era is also known as the golden age of Indonesia's economic growth. During his era, the Indonesian economy began to recover from the 1998 monetary crisis, as he was a president who truly implemented the fifth principle of Pancasila, namely social justice for all Indonesians. In his state address to the People's Consultative Assembly (MPR), he explained that

Development should not only benefit a select few, as this contradicts the morality of development, the essence of which stems from Pancasila and the UUD 1945.

He wanted to ensure that every development undertaken was in accordance with the principles of Pancasila and did not only benefit a select few. Therefore, development programs and investments undertaken by the government were truly needed by the wider community.

He also formulated a model for transforming Indonesian development that was more strongly oriented toward human development. Therefore, the government encouraged development based on pillars oriented toward pro-growth, pro-jobs, and pro-poverty reduction. This philosophy of development and investment was more productive and involved the wider community.

==== Economic programs ====
Through pro-people programs, such as the National Community Empowerment Program (PNPM), the Family Hope Program (PKH), and the People's Business Credit (KUR). Through this economic development strategy, he strives to improve the welfare of the people without exception, because the government is truly present to help the underprivileged. For example, the PKH program specifically targets very poor Indonesian families, often referred to as extreme poverty. The KUR program is a soft loan program with very low interest rates, which allows for a favorable business climate. PNPM is a special program for people who are under-absorbed in the labor market, so they can be more productive. Essentially, the program was created by the government to provide fishing equipment and bait for catching fish (money).

Before ending his term, President Yudhoyono created a detailed RPJP (long-term poverty reduction plan) for 2005-2025 to ensure the program's rollout and sustainability. However, unfortunately, one of the poverty alleviation programs, namely PNPM, was abolished and not continued in the next presidential leadership era, and more focus was placed on developing infrastructure and economics, forgetting the basic principles of developing a social justice economy as stated in Pancasila.

The Yudhoyono government understands that good economic growth also requires good connectivity, namely through infrastructure development. He initiated the formation of MP3EI (Master plan for the Acceleration of Indonesian economic development) which has the principles of pro-growth, pro-employment and pro-poverty in accordance with the fifth principle of social justice for the Indonesian people. Therefore, he also formed KP3EI (Committee for the Acceleration and expansion of Indonesian economic development) which consists of elements of the government (ministries), private sector (Kadin) and academics (KIN/BRIN) to monitor and evaluate infrastructure development programs to be in accordance with the initial idea of its formation. But unfortunately after the next presidential administration, MP3EI and KP3EI were abolished and replaced by PSN (National Strategic Project) which was suspected of not having a chain effect on increasing economic productivity and seemed wasteful because it was deemed not needed by the community.

==== Economic legislation ====
During President Yudhoyono's leadership, he sought to strengthen laws that increased Indonesia's economic productivity, such as the Extension System Law, the Teachers and Lecturers Law, the Sports Law, the Trade Law, the Industry Law, the Plantation Law, the Maritime Affairs Law, the Fisheries Law, the Islands and Coastal Law, the Agricultural Land Protection Law, the Zakat Law, the Social Welfare Law, the Social Security Agency (BPJS) Law, and the Village Law.

The Village Law is a law that reforms the village institutional system and makes it the subject of national economic development. Development planning is carried out from the bottom up, ensuring that national development is effective and enjoyed by the lowest levels of society. This includes village funds, which are sourced from the state budget. Government support for legal certainty across all sectors of the Indonesian economy has also contributed to increasing Indonesia's economic productivity.

However, after he left office, the direction of national economic development began to change, with less involvement from the business sector, academia, civil society, and participatory planning from the grassroots level. This resulted in much of the national development being less beneficial and failing to generate economic productivity. Furthermore, laws affecting many people's lives (strategic economic sectors) were combined into one Omnibus law (the Job Creation Law), which reduced oversight and protection for workers, particularly those with low wages, and favoured foreign investors.

=== Education and social protection ===
BPJS Kesehatan

The Yudhoyono administration also strives to ensure that all Indonesians are protected through national social security, which can improve the welfare and protection of Indonesians in the areas of health and old-age security. This is achieved through Law No. 24 of 2011 concerning the Social Security Administering Body (BPJS). The law represented a government initiative to improve public welfare through health and employment insurance systems, modeled after global universal healthcare frameworks. Indonesia stands as the largest nation to implement such a universal healthcare system.

According to the Coordinating Minister for People's Welfare, Agung Laksono

"Private insurance companies need not worry about the implementation of Law concerning the Social Security Administering Body (BPJS), there will still be middle to upper income groups who need their services"

The law calls for the establishment of a Social Security System which will be operated by an institution that will be formed by combining two state-owned companies, namely PT Jamsostek which provides workers' social security BPJS Ketenagakerjaan and PT Askes which is engaged in health insurance BPJS Kesehatan. The merger of the two companies was expected to occur before 1 January 2014. Meanwhile, according to Suryo Bambang Sulisto, Chairman of the Indonesian Chamber of Commerce and Industry (Kadin)

"Indonesian entrepreneurs accepted the law as something positive and Kadin members were ready to apply it in their companies"

In the field of education, Yudhoyono has implemented a number of programs to improve the development of Indonesian human resources, including the Schools Operational Assistance (BOS) program which was established in July 2005. Under this arrangement, the government provides money to school principals to help finance the running of schools. BOS is expected to provide significant financial assistance to schools, schools are expected to reduce fees or if they are able, eliminate fees altogether, in addition in June 2006, Yudhoyono launched "BOS Buku" which provides funds for the purchase of textbooks. In 2011, he founded LPDP, a social institution that provides scholarships for Indonesian children who want to continue their higher education at home and abroad. He also founded the Indonesian Defense University, a higher education institution that specifically studies military and defence strategy studies and near the institution was founded the Indonesia Peace and Security Center (IPSC) an institution that specifically educates Indonesian peacekeeping troops for the UN, which he initiated because of his time as part of the UN peacekeeping force.

=== Other activities ===
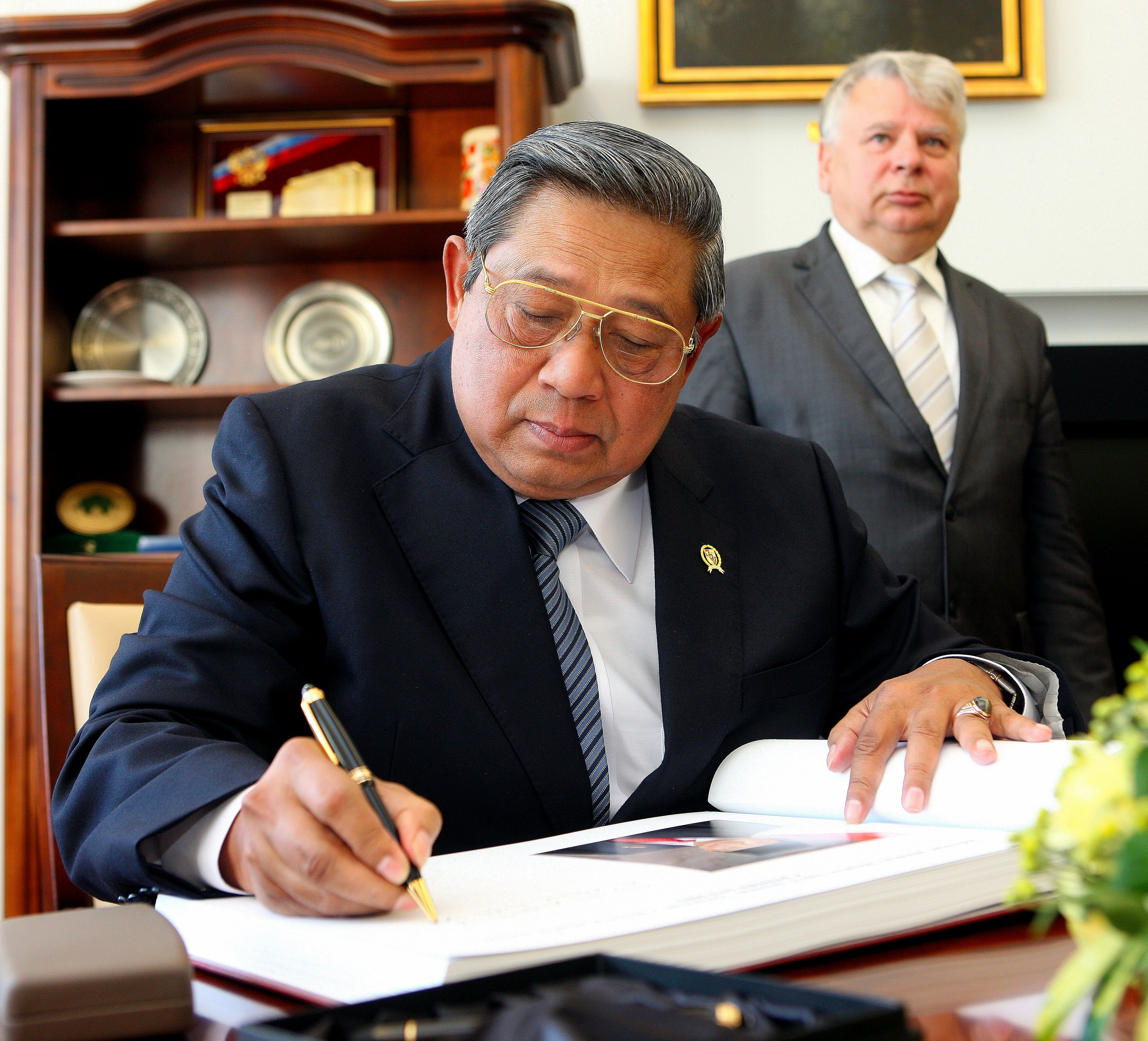
Yudhoyono in the Polish Senate, September 2013

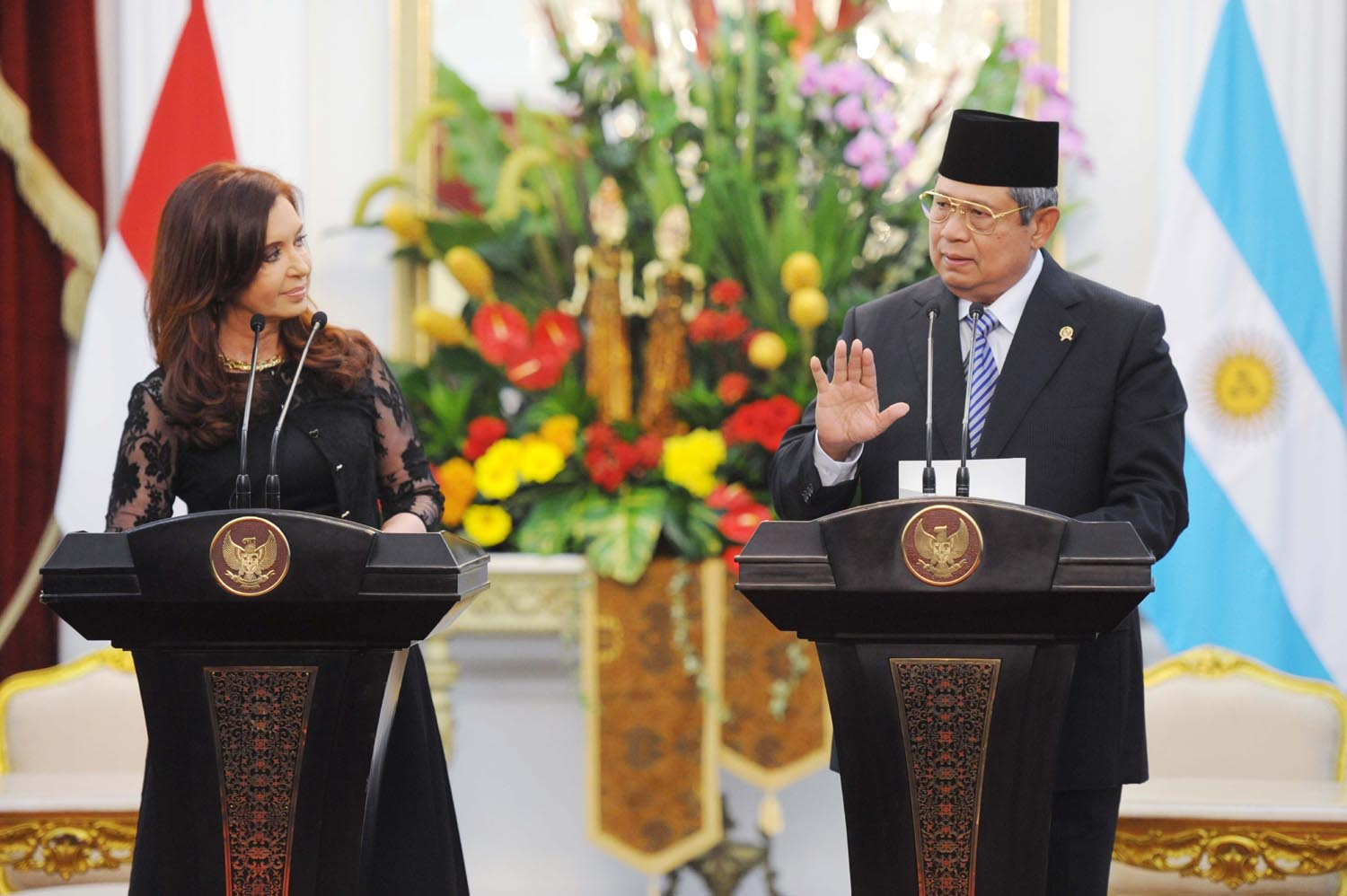
Yudhoyono with Argentine President Cristina Fernández de Kirchner in 2013

On 17 August 2007, Yudhoyono proposed that eight nations that were home to some 80% of the world's tropical rainforests join diplomatic ranks amid increasing concern over global warming. Indonesia led a summit of eight countries (on 24 September in New York) – Brazil, Cameroon, Congo, Costa Rica, Gabon, Indonesia, Malaysia and Papua New Guinea. On 3–15 December 2007, Indonesia hosted the 13th Conferences of the Parties (COP-13) under the United Nations Framework Convention on Climate Change (UNFCCC) in Bali.

During the Pope Benedict XVI Islam controversy, Yudhoyono stated that the Pope's comments were "unwise and inappropriate," but also that "Indonesian Muslims should have wisdom, patience, and self-restraint to address this sensitive issue....We need them so that harmony among people is not at stake."

Yudhoyono was one of the 100 World's Most Influential People in 2009 according to TIME Magazine.

During an official visit to Australia on 9–11 March 2010, he was appointed an Honorary Companion of the Order of Australia (AC) and addressed Australian Parliament, the first Indonesian head of state to do so.

Yudhoyono was made an honorary Knight Grand Cross of the Order of the Bath (GCB) by HM Queen Elizabeth II on 30 October 2012.

=== Assassination plot and espionage target ===
Indonesian security forces claimed to have uncovered a plot to murder Yudhoyono, which was set on Indonesian Independence Day on 17 August 2010.

In the Snowden disclosures it was revealed that the Australian Signals Directorate surveilled Yudhoyono.

=== Political party ===
During his presidency, Yudhoyono further consolidated his position within the Democratic Party. In May 2005, at PD's first National Congress, Yudhoyono was elected chairman of the executive board (Ketua Dewan Pembina). In this position, Yudhoyono had the highest authority, superseding that of chairman.

=== Presidential hotline and social media ===
On approximately June 2005, Yudhoyono started a SMS hotline service linked to phone number 0811109949, but the service encountered a technical problem due to too many SMS messages. Then, Yudhoyono switches the SMS service to 9949, in which the SMS will later be directed to the main number. Number 9949 is a symbolic number as it was a code for Yudhoyono's birthday, 9 September 1949. Later on 28 June 2005, Yudhoyono sent a SMS message to the public to warn them about drugs. The SMS was verified and Yudhoyono's presidential spokesperson said that the president will send more SMS regarding to it later.

Yudhoyono is the first Indonesian president to have an official social media account. On 13 April 2013, he sent his first tweet in Twitter through his private account @SBYudhoyono. This twitter account is run by his staff and himself, with posts directly written by him were tagged as *SBY* at the end of the message. His first tweet was as follows:

"Halo, Indonesia. saya bergabung ke dunia Twitter untuk berbagi sapa, pandangan, dan inspirasi. Salam kenal. *SBY*"

["Hello, Indonesia. I joined Twitter to share greetings, views, and inspiration. Nice to meet you. *SBY*"]

— @SBYudhoyono

Through this twitter account, Yudhoyono hopes to be able to hear the people's voice. He also states that he is ready to be sneered by other social media users.

== Post-presidency (2014–present) ==
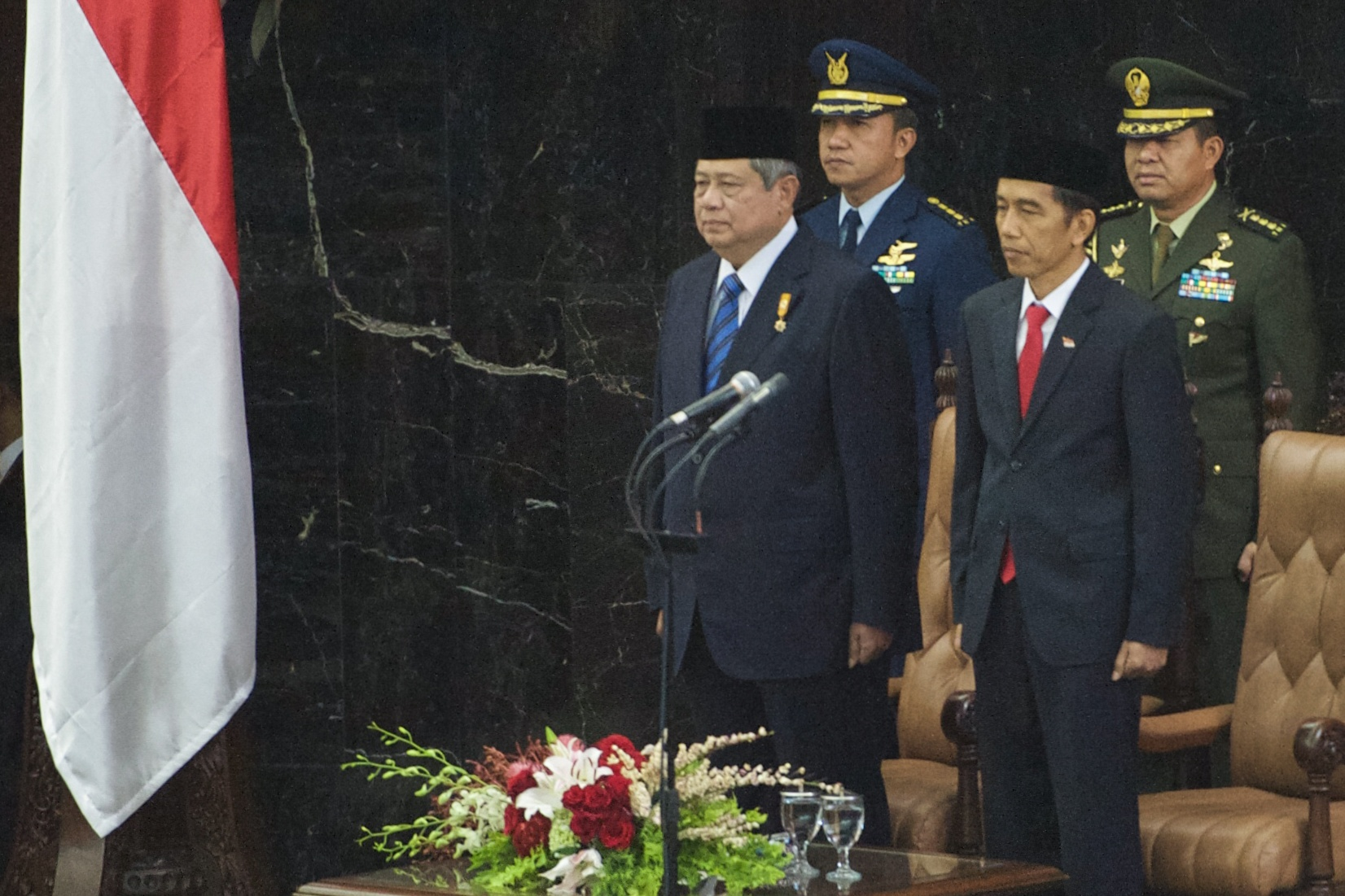
Yudhoyono standing next to his successor, Joko Widodo, during the latter's inauguration, October 2014

After his terms as president ended, Yudhoyono remained active in politics, being re-elected as leader of his party in 2015. In the 2019 presidential election, he supported Prabowo Subianto's second bid for presidency. Yudhoyono was replaced by his son Agus Harimurti Yudhoyono as the leader of the Democratic Party on 15 March 2020.

After 10 years of his presidency ended on 20 October 2014, SBY was elected as President of the Assembly and Chair of the Council of the Global Green Growth Institute for the period September 2014 to December 2016. SBY succeeded Danish Prime Minister (from 2009 to 2011 and since June 2015) Lars Løkke Rasmussen, the previous GGGI Council chair.

He continued to live with his wife Ani until her death on 1 June 2019. In November 2021, it was announced Yudhoyono was diagnosed with early-stage prostate cancer.

In the 2024 presidential election, he initially backed Anies Baswedan and had a meeting with him in his private library to give campaign advice. But then, he withdraw his support after Anies picked Muhaimin Iskandar as his running mate without any consultation with the Democratic Party, calling out Anies and NasDem Party as dishonest. He then choose to back Prabowo by stating his readiness and comfort to join him in his campaign on 18 September 2023, confirming his endorsement on 20 November 2023. Prabowo stated that Yudhoyono had given him a great morale boost and trust, even expressing his astonishment and gratitude when Yudhoyono decided to show up on his final rally in Gelora Bung Karno Stadium on foot, walking for 7 km.

== Personal life ==
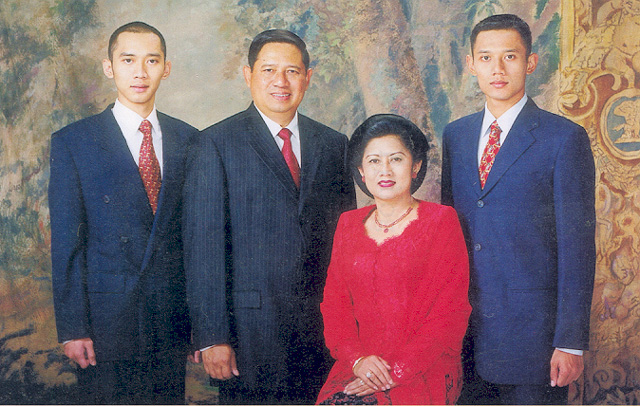
Yudhoyono family in 2003 (L–R): Edhie Baskoro Yudhoyono, Susilo Bambang Yudhoyono, Ani Yudhoyono, and Agus Harimurti Yudhoyono

During his presidency, Yudhoyono lived both in the presidential Merdeka Palace in Jakarta and at his family residence in Cikeas, Bogor with his wife, Ani Yudhoyono. First Lady Ani Yudhoyono held a political science degree from Merdeka University, and was the first vice-chairman of her husband's Democratic Party. She was the eldest child of retired army Lt. General Sarwo Edhie Wibowo, one of Indonesia's high-profile generals.

The family's eldest son, Agus Harimurti Yudhoyono (born 1978), graduated from Taruna Nusantara High School in 1997 and the Indonesian Military Academy in 2000 and is a holder of the Adhi Makayasa Medal like his father, continuing family tradition as the best graduate of the Military Academy. In July 2006, Agus graduated from the Institute of Defense and Strategic Studies, Singapore with a master's degree in strategic studies, and is currently studying at Harvard University. In a speech at Harvard Kennedy School in September 2009, Yudhoyono joked that his son became "another Harvard student working for" him – some of Yudhoyono's ministers and military generals also went to Harvard. He is married to Annisa Pohan, a fashion model and the daughter of Aulia Pohan, a former Bank Indonesia deputy governor. The couple's daughter, Almira Tunggadewi Yudhoyono, was born on 17 August 2008. He served as the 15th Minister of Agrarian Affairs and Spatial Planning under Joko Widodo's presidency from February 2024 until the end of Jokowi's Onward Indonesia Cabinet in October 2024. He is now currently serving as the 1st Coordinating Minister for Infrastructure and Regional Development under Prabowo's presidency since October 2024.

The family's younger son, Edhie Baskoro Yudhoyono (born 1980), received his bachelor's degree in economics from the Curtin University of Technology in Perth, Western Australia and his master's degree from the Institute of Defense and Strategic Studies, Singapore. He is married to Siti Ruby Aliya Radjasa, daughter of Hatta Rajasa, one of his father's prominent Cabinet ministers. They have two sons, Airlangga Satriadhi Yudhoyono and Pancasakti Maharajasa Yudhoyono, and two daughters, Gayatari Idalia Yudhoyono and Alisha Prameswari Yudhoyono. He is currently serving as the Member of People's Representative Council from East Java VII for 2019–2024 period, member of Sixth Commission, and also parliamentary group chairman for Democratic Party's faction since October 2019.

=== Family tree ===
Raden Soekotjo; 1925–2001	Siti Habibah; 1932–2019	Sarwo; Edhie Wibowo; 1925–1989	Sunarti Sri Hadiyah; 1930–2021
Aulia Tantowi Pohan b. 1945	Mulyaningsih	Susilo Bambang Yudhoyono b. 1949	Kristiani Herrawati Yudhoyono; 1952–2019	Pramono Edhie Wibowo; 1955–2020	Muhammad Hatta Rajasa b. 1953	Oktiniwati Ulfa Dariah Rajasa
Annisa Larasati Pohan b. 1981	Agus Harimurti Yudhoyono b. 1978	Edhie Baskoro Yudhoyono b. 1980	Siti Ruby Aliya Rajasa b. 1986
Almira Tunggadewi Yudhoyono b. 2008	Airlangga Satriadhi Yudhoyono b. 2012	Pancasakti Maharajasa Yudhoyono b. 2015	Gayatri Idalia Yudhoyono b. 2018	Alisha Prameswari Yudhoyono b. 2022

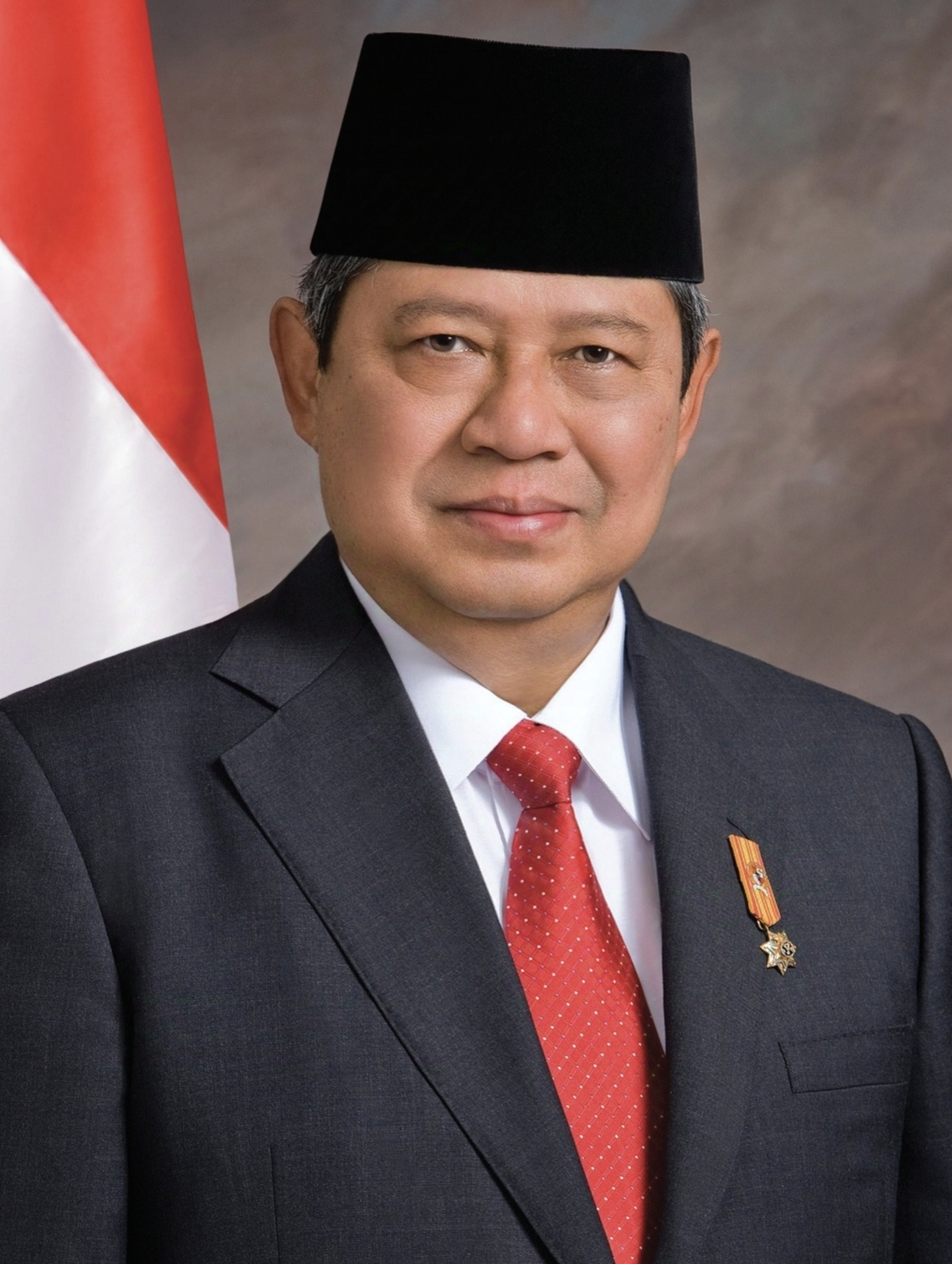
Susilo Bambang Yudhoyono

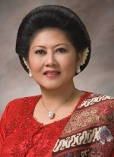
Ani Yudhoyono

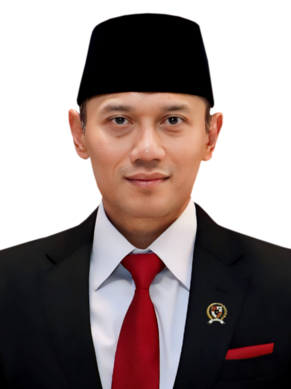
Agus Harimurti Yudhoyono

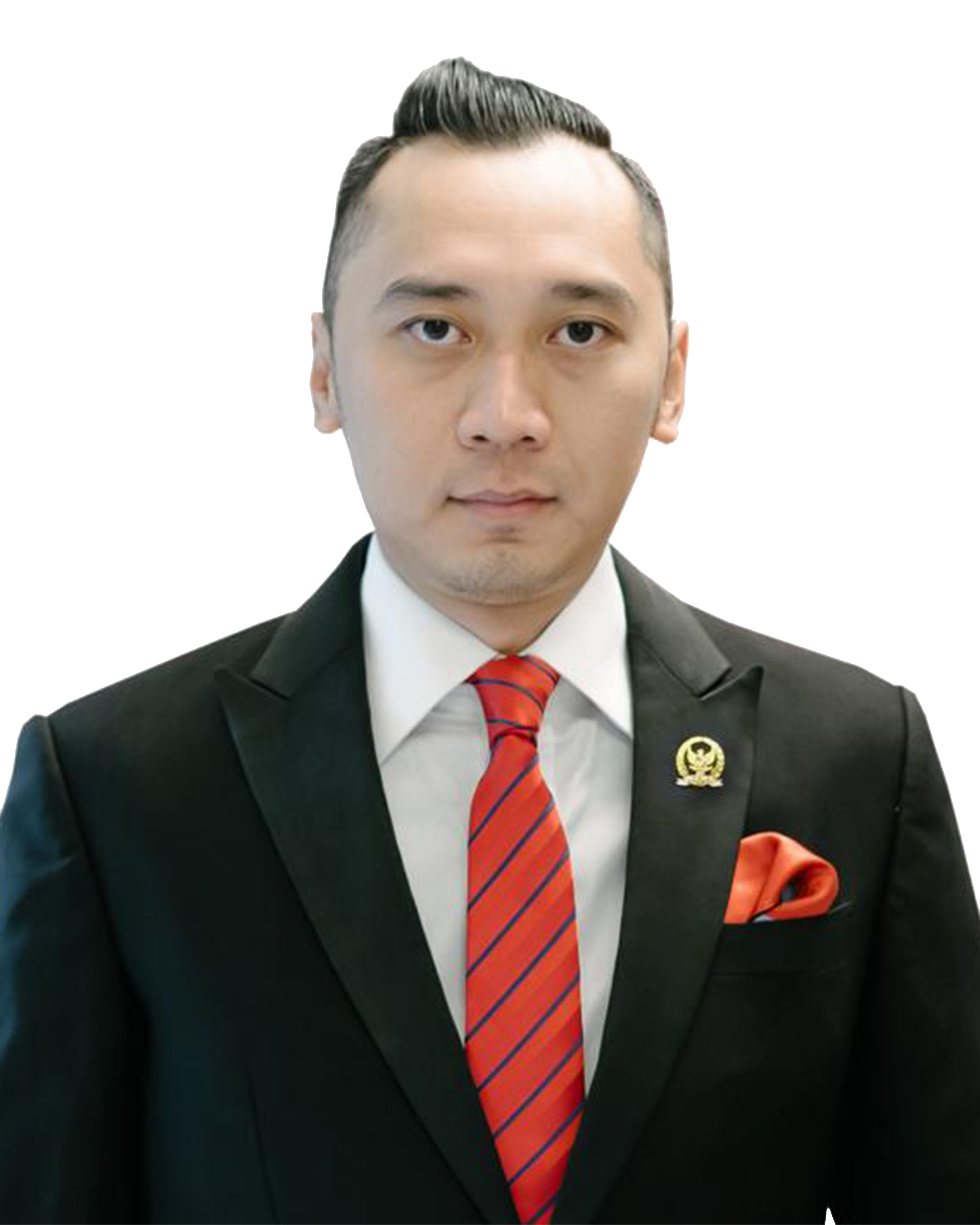
Edhie Baskoro Yudhoyono

=== Hobbies ===
Yudhoyono mentioned that volleyball is his favourite sport. He said he has loved the sport and played it when he was a middle school student, high school student, as a cadet in the Indonesian Military Academy, and even during his presidency when he make time to play. His love for the sport motivated him to form a volleyball team, Bogor LavAni on 1 December 2019, in which the name of the team derives from "Love" and "Ani" in honor of his love for his late wife, Ani Yudhoyono.

=== Health ===
Yudhoyono once suffered a kidney infection and received treatment at Gatot Soebroto Army Central Hospital on 17 July 2018. On 2 November 2021, he was diagnosed with early stage prostate cancer and received medical care in Mayo Clinic at Rochester, Minnesota. During Yudhoyono’s stay, then president Joko Widodo sent his presidential medical team to the United States to assist with his treatment.

== Arts and literature ==
In 2023, Yudhoyono opened SBY-Ani Museum and Gallery in Pacitan. The museum is dedicated to his life and the art gallery contains artworks and songs owned or created by him and his wife Ani Yudhoyono.

=== Paintings ===
According to Democratic Party member Andi Mallarangeng, Yudhoyono liked to paint since his teenage years in Pacitan, but he stopped after joining AKABRI. He restarted his painting hobby after the death of his wife. He also created his own painting studio named SBY Art Studio. His notable artworks include No Justice No Peace (2023).

=== Music ===
Susilo Bambang Yudhoyono is a musician and in his younger days was part of a band called Gaya Teruna. In the 2000s, he has come back to his early love of music by authoring and co-authoring three pop albums.

- In 2007, he released his first music album entitled My Longing for You (English title), a collection of love ballads and religious songs. The 10-song track list features some of the country's popular singers performing the songs.
- In 2009, he joined forces with Yockie Suryoprayogo under the name "Yockie and Susilo" releasing the album Evolusi.
- In 2010, he released a new third album entitled I'm Certain I'll Make It (English title).
- In 2011, he is the producer of Afgan Syahreza's single Kembali.

=== Literature ===
- Yudhoyono, Susilo Bambang (2000). Noeh, Munawar Fuad; Mustofa, Kurdi (eds.). Mengatasi Krisis, Menyelamatkan Reformasi (in Indonesian) (2nd ed.). Jakarta: Pusat Pengkajian Etika Politik dan Pemerintahan. ISBN 979-9357-00-4.
- Yudhoyono, Susilo Bambang (2004). Taman Kehidupan: Kumpulan Puisi (in Indonesian) (2nd ed.). Jakarta: Yayasan Nida Utama. ISBN 979-96431-8-X.
- Yudhoyono, Susilo Bambang (2004). Revitalizing Indonesian Economy: Business, Politics, and Good Governance. Bogor: Brighten Press. ISBN 979-96431-5-5.
- Yudhoyono, Susilo Bambang (2005). Transforming Indonesia: Selected International Speeches (2nd ed.). Jakarta: Office of Special Staff of the President for International Affairs in co-operation with PT Buana Ilmu Populer. ISBN 979-694-876-1.

== In popular culture ==
- Pandji Pragiwaksono portrayed Susilo Bambang Yudhoyono in the 2015 drama movie Di Balik 98, directed by Lukman Sardi.
- In The Tomorrow War, Yudhoyono appears less than a second in a footage of his actual visit with the former British PM Gordon Brown on 31 March 2009, when a G20 forum was held in London. In July 2021, the Democratic Party official Herzaky Mahendra Putra said that Yudhoyono is a "protagonist" and a "deciding character."

== Electoral history ==
Electoral history of Susilo Bambang Yudhoyono
Year	Office	Party	Votes received								Result
Year	Office	Party	First round				Second round				Result
Year	Office	Party	Total	%	P.	Swing	Total	%	P.	Swing	Result
2004	President of Indonesia	Demokrat	39,838,184	33.57%	1st	—N/a	69,266,350	60.62%	1st	—N/a	Won
2009	President of Indonesia	Demokrat	73,874,562	60.80%	1st	+27.23	—N/a				Won

== Honours ==
=== National honours ===
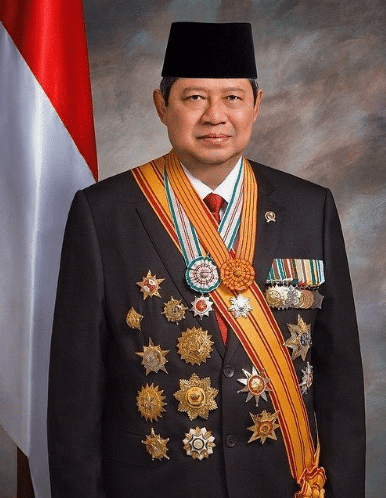
Yudhoyono's second-term official state portrait with his presidential and military decorations

Star of the Republic of Indonesia, 1st Class (Indonesian: Bintang Republik Indonesia Adipurna) (27 October 2004)		Star of Mahaputera, 1st Class (Indonesian: Bintang Mahaputera Adipurna) (27 October 2004)	
Star of Mahaputera, 3rd Class (Indonesian: Bintang Mahaputera Utama) (20 August 1999)	Star of Service, 1st Class (Indonesian: Bintang Jasa Utama) (27 October 2004)	Star of Humanities (Indonesian: Bintang Kemanusiaan) (18 June 2009)	Star of the Upholder of Democracy, 1st Class (Indonesian: Bintang Penegak Demokrasi Utama) (18 June 2009)
Cultural Merit Star (Indonesian: Bintang Budaya Parama Dharma) (27 October 2004)	Guerrilla Star (Indonesian: Bintang Gerilya) (27 October 2004)	Sacred Star (Indonesian: Bintang Sakti) (27 October 2004)	Military Distinguished Service Star (Indonesian: Bintang Dharma) (25 November 1998)
Grand Meritorious Military Order Star, 1st Class (Indonesian: Bintang Yudha Dharma Utama) (27 October 2004)	Army Meritorious Service Star, 1st Class (Indonesian: Bintang Bintang Kartika Eka Paksi Utama) (27 October 2004)	Navy Meritorious Service Star, 1st Class (Indonesian: Bintang Jalasena Utama) (27 October 2004)	Air Force Meritorious Service Star, 1st Class (Indonesian: Bintang Swa Bhuwana Paksa Utama) (27 October 2004)
National Police Meritorious Service Star, 1st Class (Indonesian: Bintang Bhayangkara Utama) (8 August 2001)	Grand Meritorious Military Order Star, 2nd Class (Indonesian: Bintang Yudha Dharma Pratama) (22 November 2000)	Army Meritorious Service Star, 2nd Class (Indonesian: Bintang Bintang Kartika Eka Paksi Pratama) (9 May 2000)	Grand Meritorious Military Order Star, 3rd Class (Indonesian: Bintang Yudha Dharma Nararya) (2 March 2000)
Army Meritorious Service Star, 3rd Class (Indonesian: Bintang Bintang Kartika Eka Paksi Nararya) (23 June 1999)	Military Long Service Medal, 24 Years (Indonesian: Satyalancana Kesetiaan) (1998)	Military Instructor Service Medal (Indonesian: Satyalancana Dwidya Sistha) (1987)	Timor Military Campaign Medal (Indonesian: Satyalancana Seroja) w/ 2 gold star (1979)
Presidential Guard Medal (Indonesian: Satyalancana Wira Siaga)	United Nations Protection Force (UNPROFOR) Medal (1996)	Military Peacekeeping Medal (Indonesian: Satyalancana Santi Dharma) (1996)	United Nations Transitional Administration for Eastern Slavonia, Baranja and Western Sirmium (UNTAES) Medal (1996)

=== Foreign honours ===
Ribbon	Distinction	Country	Date	Reference
	Honorary Companion of the Order of Australia (AC)	Australia	9 March 2010	
	The Most Esteemed Family Order of Brunei (DK)	Brunei	27 February 2006	
	Grand-collar of the Order of Timor-Leste	East Timor	19 May 2012	
	30th Anniversary of the Independence of the Republic of Kazakhstan Jubilee Medal	Kazakhstan	24 August 2022	
	Order of the Crown of the Realm (DMN)	Malaysia	11 January 2008	
	Grand Companion of the Order of Logohu (GCL)	Papua New Guinea	11 March 2010	
	Grand Collar (Raja) of the Order of Sikatuna	Philippines	23 March 2014	
	Collar of the Order of Abdulaziz Al Saud	Saudi Arabia	26 April 2006	
	Darjah Utama Temasek (First Class) (DUT)	Singapore	3 September 2014	
	Grand Order of Mugunghwa	South Korea	19 November 2014	
	Honorary Knight Grand Cross of the Order of the Bath (GCB)	United Kingdom	30 October 2012	

Political offices
Preceded by Megawati Sukarnoputri	President of Indonesia; 20 October 2004 – 20 October 2014	Succeeded by Joko Widodo
Preceded by Agum Gumelar	Coordinating Minister for Political and Security Affairs; 2001–2004	Succeeded by Hari Sabarno (acting); Widodo Adi Sutjipto
Preceded by Soerjadi Soedirdja	Coordinating Minister for Political, Social, and Security Affairs; 2000–2001	Succeeded by Agum Gumelar
Preceded by Kuntoro Mangkusubroto	Minister of Mining and Energy; 1999–2000	Succeeded by Purnomo Yusgiantoro
Party political offices
Preceded by Anas Urbaningrum	Chairman of the Democratic Party; 2013–2020	Succeeded by Agus Harimurti Yudhoyono
New political party	Democratic Party nominee for President of Indonesia; 2004, 2009 (won)	Succeeded by None
Military offices
Preceded by Karyono	Commander of Kodam II/Sriwijaya; 1996–1997	Succeeded by Suadi Atma
Diplomatic posts
Preceded by Nguyễn Minh Triết	Chairperson of ASEAN; 2011	Succeeded by Hun Sen
Preceded by Vladimir Putin	Chairperson of APEC; 2013	Succeeded by Xi Jinping
