= GIU =

GIU may refer to:

- Gang intelligence unit
- Gelao Mulao language
- Government Investment Unit of Indonesia
- Sigiriya Airport, in Sri Lanka
- Giu (Mandaeism), a demon in Mandaeism
