= Indonesian International Islamic University =

Public university in Depok, West Java, Indonesia

Coordinates: 6.388°S 106.862°E

- Universitas Islam Internasional Indonesia (Indonesian) الجامعة الإسلامية العالمية الإندونيسية (Arabic)
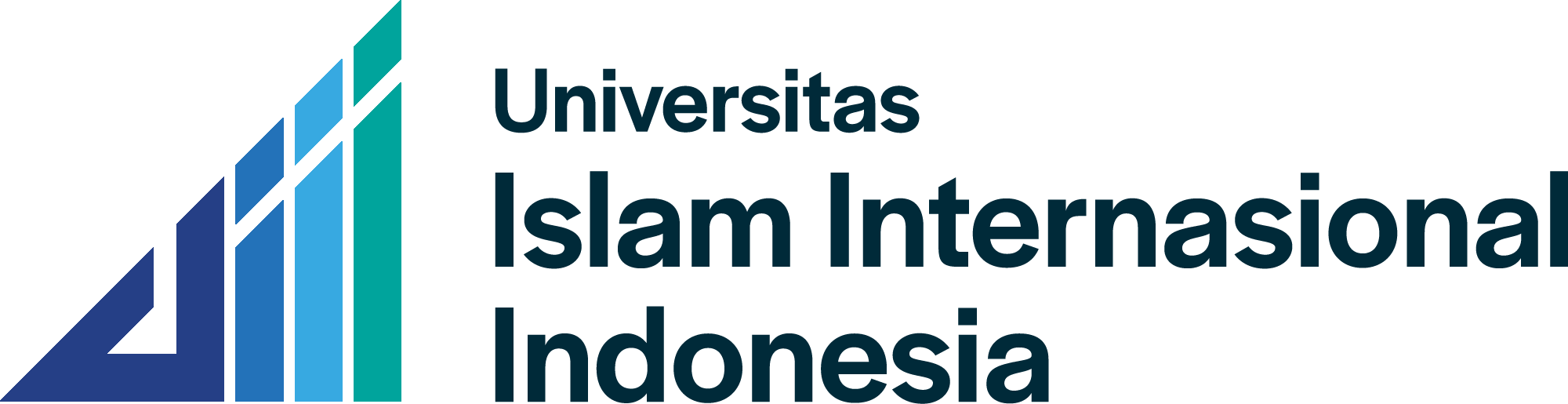
- Type: Public university
- Established: 29 June 2016
- Parent institution: Ministry of Religious Affairs
- Rector: Prof. Jamhari Makruf, M.A., Ph.D.
- Academic staff: 25 (as of 2022)
- Postgraduates: 189 (as of 2022)
- Doctoral students: 40 (as of 2022)
- Location: Bogor Main Street KM 33,5 Cisalak, Sukmajaya 16416, Depok, West Java, Indonesia
- Campus: 142.5 hectares (352 acres); Urban
- Language: Arabic, English
- Colors: White and blue
- Website: uiii.ac.id

Indonesian International Islamic University (Indonesian: Universitas Islam Internasional Indonesia; Arabic: الجامعة الإسلامية العالمية الإندونيسية; romanized: al-Jāmʿia al-ʾIslāmiyya al-ʾĀlamiyya Biinduniziya, abbreviated as UIII) is an Islamic international public university located in Depok, West Java, Indonesia. The university was initiated by then-President of Indonesia, Joko Widodo—through Presidential Regulation No. 57 of 2016. While the regulation for the university establishment was passed in 2016, the campus' construction works began in 2018. Its medium of instruction is English, with Arabic used in courses related to Islamic sciences, although the university also uses the Indonesian language in certain courses.

== Curriculum ==
The curriculum for the master's and doctoral programs at Universitas Islam Internasional Indonesia (UIII) is designed to ensure that graduates achieve a high level of expertise in their respective fields, in alignment with the Indonesian National Qualifications Framework. It includes courses that develop general, core, and supporting competencies essential for graduate qualifications. General competencies are fostered through a variety of courses and scholarly activities, contributing significantly to the students' academic and professional development. The curriculum is structured into foundational, core, and elective courses. Foundational courses provide students with a broad understanding of their discipline, core courses focus on essential competencies, and elective courses offer flexibility for students to specialize in areas of interest. Additionally, a mandatory course on Wasathiyah Islam is included, aimed at deepening students' understanding of moderate Islamic values.

== Admissions ==
For UIII Admissions in the 2022/2023 academic year, a total of 1,496 applicants from 31 countries participated in the application process. The applicant pool consisted of 65% Indonesian and 35% international applicants. Notably, 150 students were accepted, constituting 10% of the total applicants. Among the admitted students, there were 107 Master's candidates and 43 Doctoral candidates, distributed across various faculties.

== Scholarships ==
The UIII-LPDP Scholarship Program, managed by Indonesian International Islamic University in collaboration with the Indonesia Endowment Fund for Education (LPDP), provides comprehensive financial support to both Indonesian and international students pursuing Master’s and Doctoral programs at UIII. Established in 2011, LPDP supports educational sustainability and the development of future leaders across various fields. The scholarship targets emerging global leaders who demonstrate strong academic and leadership qualities, covering three years for Master’s programs and four years for Doctoral studies.

== Faculties ==
Currently, there are four faculties on the Indonesian International Islamic University.

- Faculty of Islamic Studies
- Faculty of Social Sciences
- Faculty of Economics and Business
- Faculty of Education
- Faculty of Science and Technology

== Gallery ==
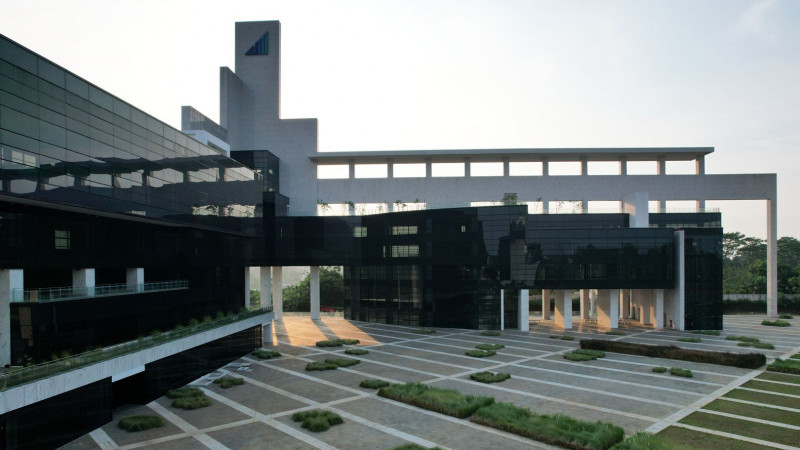
UIII's rectorate building

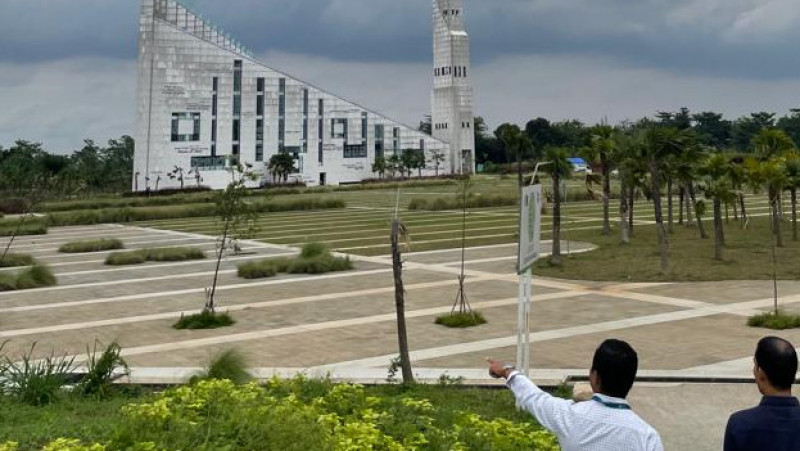
UIII's mosque
