= Village Law =

Village Law may refer to:

- Indonesian Village Law
- Village Law (Turkey)
- A chapter of the Consolidated Laws of New York

== See also ==
- Local ordinance
