= Indonesia Endowment Fund for Education =

Indonesian educational grant program

Indonesia Endowment Fund for Education Agency
- Lembaga Pengelola Dana Pendidikan
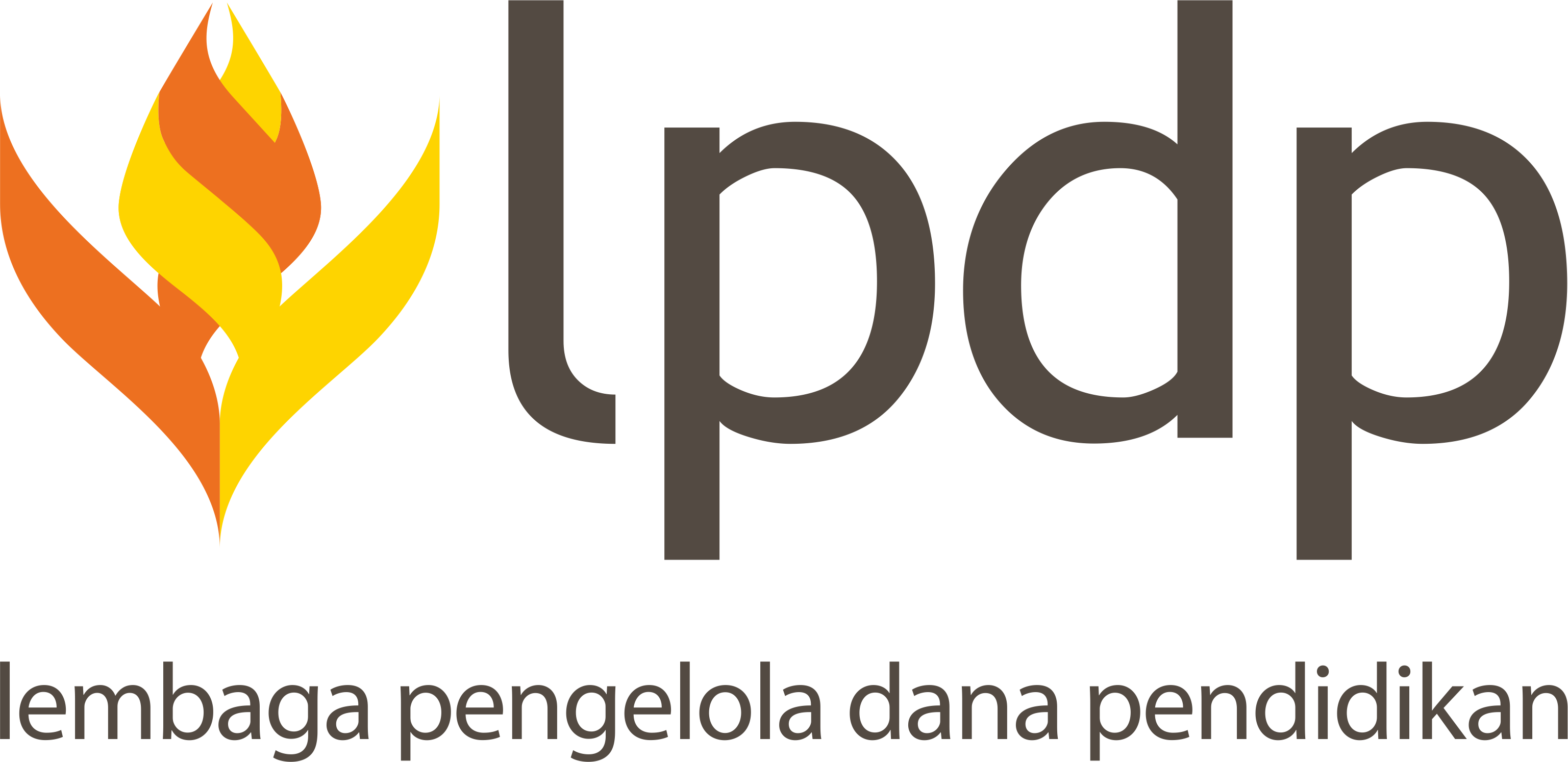
- LPDP official logo

Agency overview
- Formed: 28 December 2011; 14 years ago
- Jurisdiction: Government of Indonesia
- Headquarters: Jakarta, Indonesia; 6°11′36.59″S 106°50′21.51″E
- Agency executive: Andin Hadiyanto, Director
- Parent department: Ministry of Finance
- Website: lpdp.kemenkeu.go.id

The Indonesia Endowment Fund for Education Agency (Indonesian: Lembaga Pengelola Dana Pendidikan, lit. 'Institute of Education Fund Management', abbreviated as LPDP) is a public service agency of the Ministry of Finance of Indonesia mandated with managing the state's education endowment fund. Investment in the fund partially fulfills a clause in the Constitution of Indonesia stipulating that the government spend at least 20 percent of the state budget on education.

== Mandate ==
Management of Indonesia's National Education Development Fund (Dana Pembangunan Pendidikan Nasional) is the mandate of the LPDP. The Constitution of Indonesia stipulates that the government must allocate at least 20 percent of the state budget toward education. Investment in the fund forms a part of the government's education budget.

It provides financial support to Indonesian citizens to pursue higher education at top universities around the world. LPDP provides full scholarships for postgraduate study, including tuition and living expenses, as well as partial scholarships. The program aims to build Indonesia's human resources and develop the country's economy by investing in highly educated individuals. It seeks to empower young Indonesians to become global citizens and contribute to their nation's progress.

== History ==
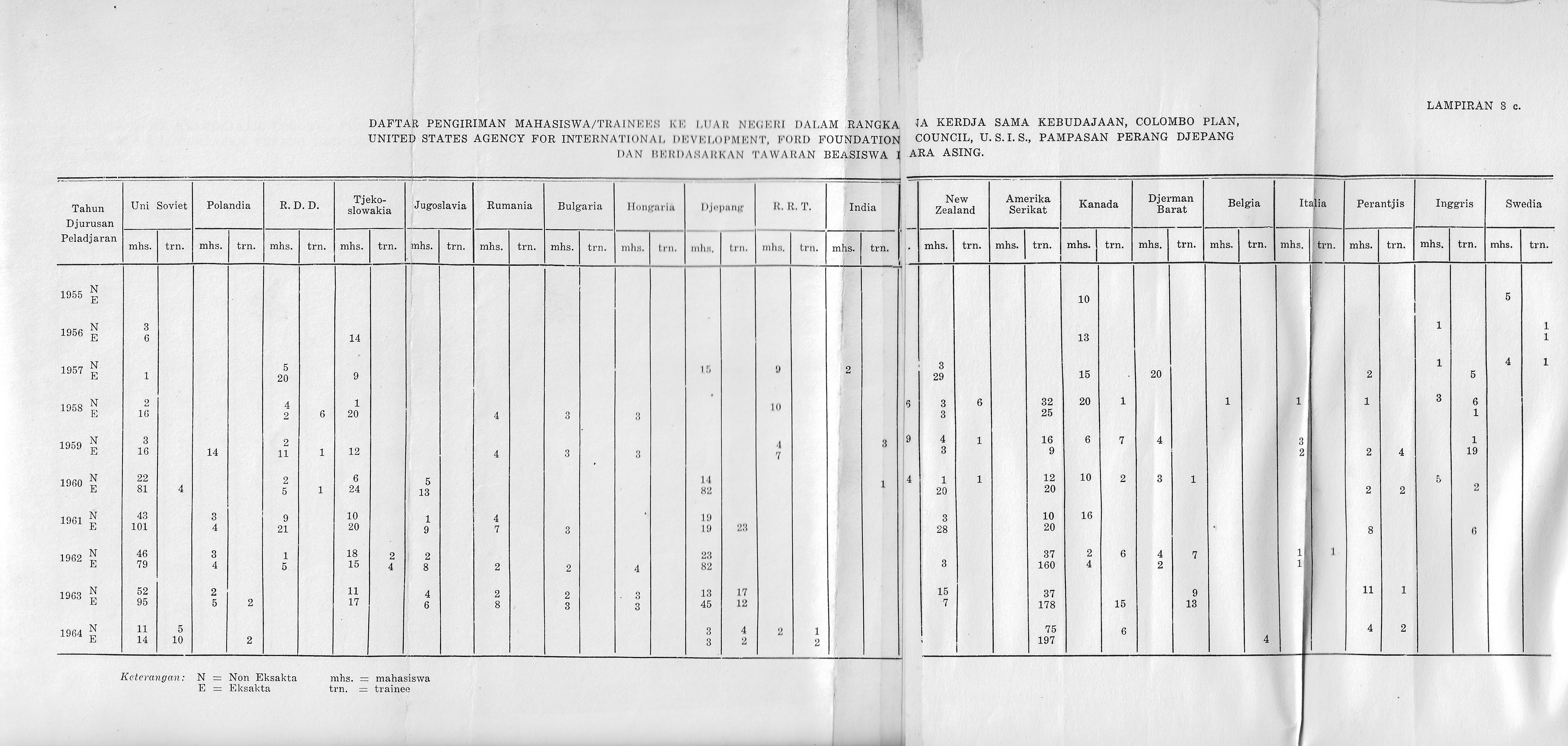
Number of recipients of foreign scholarships in Indonesia by country of destination from 1955 to 1964.

Indonesia's constitutional requirement for the government to spend at least 20 percent of the state budget on education was introduced by amendment in 2002. Public school teacher salaries, which are paid by the government, are excluded from this figure, further pressuring the government to increase discretionary spending on education. In 2005, the government introduced a provision in the national education law that would allow it to meet the requirement incrementally. Following lawsuits brought by a collection of parents, teachers, and students, the Constitutional Court ruled this provision violated the spending requirement clause, though it did not compel the government to revise its budget. The requirement was finally met in 2009.

The creation of the LPDP traces its origin to a 2010 decree by finance minister Agus Martowardojo directing the creation of an organization to manage an endowment fund that would ensure the continuity of the Indonesia's education programs. Until such an organization was created, the fund would be managed by the Government Investment Unit (Pusat Investasi Pemerintahan, or PIP). The LPDP was established the following year in a finance ministry regulation that also named the Minister of Finance, the Minister of Education and Culture, and the Minister of Religious Affairs to the agency's board of trustees. In 2012, management of the endowment fund was transferred from the PIP to the LPDP.

Since its establishment in 2010, LPDP has accumulated a total endowment fund of Rp139.1 trillion, which is used to finance its scholarship programs.

== Scholarship programs ==
In 2022, LPDP has four main scholarship programs: the Targeted Scholarship Program, the Affirmative Scholarship Program, the General Scholarship Program, and the Collaborative Scholarship Program.

In 2017, the LPDP awarded a total of 16,000 recipients, including 1,500 alumni and 10,000 ongoing students. A news release on Kompas in 2022 reported that LPDP had awarded more than 27,000 Indonesians, including more than 13,000 alumni. The awardees have a service contract obligation to work consecutively for twice the study period plus one year in Indonesia. In 2023, out of 35,536 awardees, there are 413 awardees who did not return to Indonesia; these awardees will receive sanctions in the form of refund of LPDP funds, blocking from future LPDP programmes, and publication on the official LPDP channel.

=== Notable alumni ===
The following list is a selection of LPDP recipients:

- Belva Devara, Harvard graduated and founder of Ruangguru
- Simon Tabuni, Ambassador of the Ministry of Agriculture, CEO and Owner Anggi Mart Manokwari, Papua
- Risa Santoso, Harvard graduated and Rector of Institut Teknologi & Bisnis ASIA
- Maudy Ayunda, Stanford graduate and Celebrity
- Tasya Kamila, Columbia University graduate, writer, business-woman, celebrity

== Controversies ==
The profiles of LPDP scholarship recipients have repeatedly become a subject of public debate since 2018, particularly regarding their conduct after completing their studies.

In addition, controversies have also emerged regarding the LPDP scholarship selection process, ranging from issues of transparency to allegations of discrimination.
