= Village Act =

2014 legislation in Indonesia

House of Representatives
- Long title: Act No. 6/2014 on Village (Undang-Undang Nomor 6 Tahun 2014 tentang Desa)
- Citation: LN 2014/No. 7 TLN No. 5495
- Territorial extent: Indonesia
- Passed by: House of Representatives
- Passed: 15 January 2014
- Signed by: Susilo Bambang Yudhoyono
- Signed: 15 January 2014
- Commenced: 15 January 2014

Codification
- Acts amended: Regional Government Act 2004; Regional Government (1st Amendment) Act 2005; Regional Government (2nd Amendment) Act 2008

Amended by
- Job Creation Act 2023; Village Act (1st Amendment) 2024

Keywords
- Desa
- Status: Amended

The Village Act (Indonesian: Undang-Undang Desa), officially Act No. 6 of 2014 on Village (Undang-Undang Nomor 6 Tahun 2014 tentang Desa), is a law in Indonesia. It grants greater autonomy, financial resources, and authority to rural villages (desa) to manage their governance, development, and community affairs. Enacted on 15 January 2014, the law replaced provisions of the 2004 Regional Government Act and its subsequent amendments.

The law was amended in 2024.

== Background ==
Under the 1999 Regional Government Act, villages (desa) were established as autonomous units of government within districts (kecamatan). These laws were part of a broader decentralization process introduced after the fall of the New Order regime, aimed at transferring administrative and fiscal authority from the central government to regional and local levels. As part of subsequent democratisation reforms, direct popular elections for executive offices—from the president to governors, district heads (Bupati), and village heads (Kepala Desa or Kades)—were introduced to strengthen local representation and accountability. Despite these reforms, the position of villages within Indonesia's governance structure remained ambiguous. While villages were recognised as autonomous entities, they continued to depend heavily on higher levels of government for budget allocations and administrative oversight. This situation led to demands for clearer legal recognition of village authority and financial independence.

== Legislative history ==
On 11 November 2011, tens of thousands of village heads under the Association of Nusantara Village People (Parade Nusantara) staged a protest demanding the immediate passage of the bill, threatening to halt land and building tax collection, boycott the e-KTP program, and call for President SBY to resign if their demands were not met.

One of the most crucial points in the discussion of the Bill Village, is related to the budget allocation for the village, in the explanation of Article 72 Paragraph 2 of the Rural Finance. The number of allocations directly to the village, set 10 percent of the funds transfer and outside the region. Then consider the amount of population, poverty, area, geographical difficulties. It this in order to improve rural communities because each country is expected to get about 1.4 billion fund based on the calculation of the explanation that the village law, 10 percent of the area according to the state budget and the transfer to the village of Rp 59, 2 trillion, coupled with funds from the budget by 10 percent around Rp 45.4 trillion. The total funding for the village is Rp 104, 6 trillion, which would be divided into 72 thousand villages across Indonesia.

== Content ==
The law is divided into 16 chapters and 122 articles. It regulates the recognition, governance, authority, finance, development, and supervision of villages in Indonesia. The law defines villages (desa) and traditional villages (desa adat) as self-governing community units within the country. Both categories are given equal legal standing, with authority derived from origin rights, local customs, and delegated governmental functions. Existing regulations remain valid insofar as they do not conflict with the law. Transitional measures ensure continuity of governance during implementation, while the closing provisions establish the effective date of the statute and repeal conflicting regulations.

=== Governance and authority ===
Village government consists of the village head (Kepala Desa, or Kades) and the village consultative body (Badan Permusyawaratan Desa, or BPD). The village head is directly elected by residents for a six-year term and may serve up to three consecutive terms. The BPD functions as a representative institution, tasked with channeling community aspirations, deliberating village regulations, and exercising oversight. The law grants villages authority in four domains: local governance based on origin rights, local-scale governmental affairs recognized by law, tasks assigned by higher levels of government, and other powers regulated by legislation.

The central, provincial, and regency or municipal governments are tasked with providing guidance, capacity building, and supervision. Villages remain accountable through reporting obligations and statutory oversight mechanisms.

=== Finance and development ===
Villages are entitled to financial resources in the form of village fund (Dana Desa) from the state budget, regional transfers, and locally generated revenue. Assets such as land, markets, and natural resources may be managed for community welfare, subject to principles of transparency, accountability, and participation. Development planning must be participatory, formulated through village deliberations (musyawarah desa). Priorities include infrastructure, education, health, and poverty reduction. Villages may also establish village-owned enterprises (Badan Usaha Milik Desa, or BUMDes) to manage local resources and generate income for community welfare.

=== Traditional customs ===
The law recognizes and protects customary institutions, traditional leadership, and local wisdom. Traditional villages may apply customary law (hukum adat), provided it does not conflict with national law, human rights, or the principles of the unitary state. These provisions also regulate the integration of traditional governance structures with the national system.

== Reception ==
A 2021 research by Rachael Diprose, Ken Setiawan, and Amalinda Savirani of the University of Melbourne describe the 2014 law as the "third arm of decentralization."

== See also ==
- Villages of Indonesia
