= Kodam II/Sriwijaya =

Indonesian army military region command

II Military Region Command/Sriwijaya
- Komando Daerah Militer II/Sriwijaya; KODAM II/Sriwijaya
- Coat of Arms and patch worn by Kodam II/Sriwijaya personnel.
- Active: 1 January 1946 - present
- Country: Indonesia
- Branch: Indonesian National Armed Forces Tentara Nasional Indonesia (Indonesian)
- Type: Indonesia Regional Military Command
- Part of: Indonesian Army
- Garrison/HQ: Palembang, South Sumatra
- Mottos: Patah Tumbuh Hilang Berganti (Malay Proverb) "There will be a replacement for everything"
- Colours: Green, Black and Orange
- March: Mars Sriwijaya
- Mascot: Garuda

Commanders
- Commander: Maj.Gen. M. Naudi Nurdika
- Chief of Staff: Brig.Gen. Aminton Manurung

Military Region Command II/Sriwijaya (Indonesian: Komando Daerah Militer II/Sriwijaya or Kodam II/Sriwijaya) is an Indonesian Army Regional Military Command that covers the provinces of South Sumatra and Bangka-Belitung Islands.

Starting from the existence of armed organizations that ever existed in South Sumatera, such as the People's Security Body Guards (BPKR), later transformed into the People's Security Army (TKR) within Southern Sumatra, form part of the long lineage held by the regional command. The command is named after the legendary kingdom of Srivijaya.

== History ==
Following Indonesian independence in August 1945, the new Republic began to organize various state apparatus, including military and security presence, all across former Dutch East Indies. In southern Sumatra, Division I and Division II of Commandement Sumatra was organized autonomously. Later, the 2 division reorganized themselves under the newly formed Sub-commandment South Sumatra.

On 1-5 January 1947, following gradual increase of Dutch presence in South Sumatra, armed clashes happened within and surrounding the city of Palembang. The Battle of Palembang (known in Indonesian historiography as Pertempuran 5 Hari 5 Malam), resulted in the abandonment of the city and its nearby oil refinery facilities by republican forces, as they resorted to guerilla warfare.

After the transfer of sovereignty in December 1949, republican forces reoccupied Palembang and other conquered land in South Sumatra, as well as reorganized and demobilized to a more centralized and hierarchical structure.

=== Naming changes ===
- 1 January 1946: Sub-commandment South Sumatra (Sub Komandemen Sumatera Selatan)
- 10 January 1946: Division VII/Garuda (Divisi VII/Garuda)
- 1 July 1946: Renamed back to Sub-commandment South Sumatra which oversees four Residencies of Palembang (today South Sumatra), Jambi, Bengkulu and Lampung
- 29 July 1950: Based on Army Chief of Staff Decree Number: 83/KSAD/Pati/1950, the command was renamed to Territorial Army Command (TT) II/Sriwijaya (Tentara dan Teritorium (TT) II/Sriwijaya)
- 1 February 1961: Renamed to Military Region Command IV/Sriwijaya (Komando Daerah Militer (Kodam) IV/Sriwijaya)
- 12 February 1985: Based on Army Chief of Staff Decree No. Skep/346/II/1985, the command was renamed to Military Region Command II/Sriwijaya (Komando Daerah Militer (Kodam) II/Sriwijaya), to this day.

== Organization ==
Military Region Command II/Sriwijaya is organized into following:

=== Leadership element (Unsur Pimpinan) ===
Military Region Command II/Sriwijaya is headed by a Military Region Commander (Panglima Komando Daerah Militer), abbreviated into Pangdam. They are assisted by Military Region Command HQ and oversee various territorial and operational military units in South Sumatra and Bangka-Belitung Islands.

=== Leadership support element (Unsur Pembantu Pimpinan) ===
- Military Region Command Chief of Staff (Kepala Staf Komando Daerah Militer / Kasdam), position held by 1-star Brigadier General.
- Military Region Command Inspector (Inspektur Komando Daerah Militer / Irdam), position held by 1-star Brigadier General.
- Assistants to the Military Region Commander (Asisten Panglima Komando Daerah Militer), coordinated under the chief of staff, and consists of:
  - Assistant to the Commander for Intelligence (Asisten Intelijen / Asintel)
  - Assistant to the Commander for Operations (Asisten Operasi / Asops)
  - Assistant to the Commander for Personnel (Asisten Personel / Aspers)
  - Assistant to the Commander for Logistics (Asisten Logistik / Aslog)
  - Assistant to the Commander for Territorial Affairs (Asisten Teritorial / Aster)
  - Assistant to the Commander for Planning (Asisten Perencanaan / Asren)
- Advisory Staffs to the Commander (Staf Ahli Panglima Komando Daerah Militer / Sahli)
- Liaison Officers of the Navy and Air Force (Perwira Liaison) stationed within the Military Regional Command's jurisdiction to closely coordinate inter-service relation and activities.

=== Service element (Unsur Pelayanan) ===
- Military Region Command Headquarters Detachment (Detasemen Markas Besar / Denma Mabes)
- Military Region Command General Secretariat (Sekretariat Umum / Setum)
- Military Region Command Cypher and Cyber Department (Sandi dan Siber / Sansi)
- Military Region Command Operations Command and Control Center (Pusat Pengendalian Operasi / Pusdalops)

=== Executive elements (Unsur Badan Pelaksana) ===
- Military Region Command Military Police Command (Polisi Militer Kodam / Pomdam)
- Military Region Command Public Relations Department (Penerangan Kodam / Pendam)
- Military Region Command Mental Guidance and Historical Heritage Department (Pembinaan mental dan Sejarah Kodam / Bintaljarahdam)
- Military Region Command Physical Fitness Department (Jasmani Kodam / Jasdam)
- Military Region Command Military Engineering Division (Zeni Kodam / Zidam)
- Military Region Command Communication and Electronics Department (Komunikasi dan Elektronika Kodam / Komlekdam)
- Military Region Command Medical Department (Kesehatan Kodam / Kesdam)
  - The medical department also oversees the A.K. Gani Regional Army Hospital in Palembang.
- Military Region Command Legal Department (Hukum Kodam / Kumdam)
- Military Region Command Adjudtant General's Department (Ajudan Jenderal Kodam / Ajendam)
- Military Region Command Topography Department (Topografi Kodam / Topdam)
- Military Region Command Materiel Department (Peralatan Kodam / Paldam)
- Military Region Command Finance Department (Keuangan Kodam / Kudam)
- Military Region Command Logistics and Transportation Department (Pembekalan dan Angkutan Kodam / Bekangdam)
- Military Region Command Veteran and Reserve Administration Department (Badan Pembina Administrasi Veteran dan Cadangan Kodam / Babinminvetcaddam)
- Military Region Command Information and Data Processing Department (Informasi dan Pengolahan Data Kodam / Infolahtadam)

=== Operational element (Unsur Pelaksana) ===
==== Territorial units (Satuan teritorial) ====
Territorially, the multi-province-wide Military Region Command II/Sriwijaya is further subdivided into Area Command (Komando Resor Militer / Korem), which then further subdivided into District Command (Komando Distrik Militer / Kodim).

- 0418 Independent District Command/Palembang, separated from 044 Area Command, which oversees the provincial capital and Kodam HQ in Palembang.
- 044 Area Command/Garuda Dempo, oversee Army territorial units in the Province of South Sumatra, which oversee the following districts (Komando Distrik Militer (Kodim)) and units:
  - 0401 District Command/Muba
  - 0402 District Command/OKI
  - 0403 District Command/OKU
  - 0404 District Command/Muara Enim
  - 0405 District Command/Lahat
  - 0406 District Command/Musi Rawas
  - 0430 District Command/Banyuasin
- 045 Area Command/Garuda Jaya, oversee Army territorial units in the Province of Bangka-Belitung Islands, which oversee the following districts and units:
  - 0413 District Command/Bangka
  - 0414 District Command/Belitung
  - 0431 District Command/West Bangka
  - 0432 District Command/South Bangka
  - 147th Infantry Battalion/Garuda Ksatria Jaya
  - 845th Territorial Development Infantry Battalion/Ksatria Satam, based in Tanjungpandan, attached to 045 Area Command.

==== Regimental depot (Resimen Induk Kodam) ====
The Command's Regional Training Regiment (Resimen Induk Kodam / Rindam), based outside of Lahat, serves as the training regimental depot for new recruits to the territorial command. It is organized as follows:

- Enlisted Training School (Sekolah Calon Tamtama / Secatam), provides basic military training for new enlisted personnel of the Army's territorial command.
- NCO Training School (Sekolah Calon Bintara / Secaba), provides basic military training for new NCO of the Army's territorial command.
- Combat Education and Training Depot (Depo Pendidikan dan Latihan Tempur / Dodiklatpur), provides combat education and training and exercise.
- Specialist Training Depot (Depo Pendidikan Kejuruan / Dodikjur), provides further specialized training in combat and non-combat skills.
- Civic Defense Education Depot (Depo Pendidikan Bela Negara / Dodik Bela Negara), provides basic military training and civic defense education for civilians.
  - Reserve Component Battalion (Batalyon Komponen Cadangan Kodam II/Sriwijaya / Yonkomcad Kodam II), provides reservist training

==== Combat and combat support element (Satuan Tempur dan Satuan Bantuan Tempur) ====
The Command maintain several Army units within its jurisdiction, as follows:

- 8th Infantry Brigade/Garuda Cakti, which consists of 1 HQ detachment, 1 regular infantry battalion, and 4 territorial development infantry battalions (Batalyon Infanteri Teritorial Pembangunan / Yonif TP):
  - HQ Detachment, based in Ogan Ilir.
  - 141st Infantry Battalion/Aneka Yudha
  - 846th Territorial Development Infantry Battalion/Ksatria Silampari, based in North Musi Rawas.
  - 893rd Territorial Development Infantry Battalion/Ksatria Bumi Komering, based in Martapura.
  - 894th Territorial Development Infantry Battalion/Prayatna Bumi, based in Lahat.
  - 895th Territorial Development Infantry Battalion/Kujur Cakti, based in Gelumbang.
- 200th Raider Infantry Battalion/Bhakti Negara, based in Palembang. Previously known as 145th Para-Infantry Battalion/Bhakti Negara Laga Utama, it was upgraded in 2003 to qualify for raider capability.
- 5th Cavalry Battalion/Serbu Dwipangga Ceta
  - 5th Cavalry Company/Graha Ceta Cakti, separated from its parent battalion to form independent armored cavalry company in Palembang.
- 12th Air Defense Artillery Battalion/Satria Bhuana Prakasa
- 15th Field Artillery Battalion/Cailendra
- 2nd Combat Engineer Battalion/Samara Grawira
