= Government Investment Unit of Indonesia =

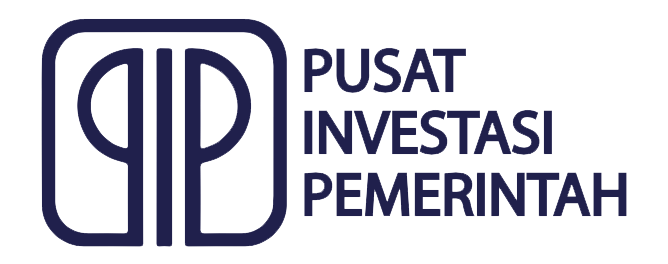
Logo of the Government Investment Unit of Indonesia

The Government Investment Unit of Indonesia, also known as the Indonesia Investment Agency or Pusat Investasi Pemerintah (PIP), is a sovereign wealth fund managed by the country's Ministry of Finance. Established in 2006 with a balance of $340 million, the PIP invests in a variety of asset classes such as equity, debt, infrastructure and direct investments. Some of the PIP's goals are to increase macroeconomic stability, economic growth, and government investment and it aims to follow in the successful footsteps of Singapore’s Temasek Holdings and Malaysia’s Khazanah Nasional.

== Investments ==
In October 2009, it was announced that Ant Global Partners Pte Ltd, a private equity firm controlled by agricultural lender Norinchukin Bank of Japan, planned to raise a $250 million clean technology fund over the following three years, focussed on ventures such as water treatment and renewable projects in Indonesia. The Indonesia Clean Technology Fund was raised in partnership with Indonesia's finance ministry and the Government Investment Unit raised 10% of the fund. In January 2010, the GIU pledged a contribution of $100 million to the Indonesian Green Investment Fund, which it will also oversee in terms of management. The fund invests in renewable energy projects and water treatment to address the effects of climate change and was inspired by the GIU-funded Indonesia Clean Technology Fund of 2009. In December 2011, the GIU invested in the State Electricity Company.
