= AHY =

AHY may refer to:

- Agus Harimurti Yudhoyono, Indonesian politician and son of former president Susilo Bambang Yudhoyono
- Azerbaijan Airlines (ICAO code AHY)
- Some 2.5 R5 TDI 65-121kW Volkswagen Group diesel engines (ID code AHY)
