= Coordinating Ministry for Infrastructure and Regional Development =

- Kementerian Koordinator Bidang Infrastruktur dan Pembangunan Kewilayahan
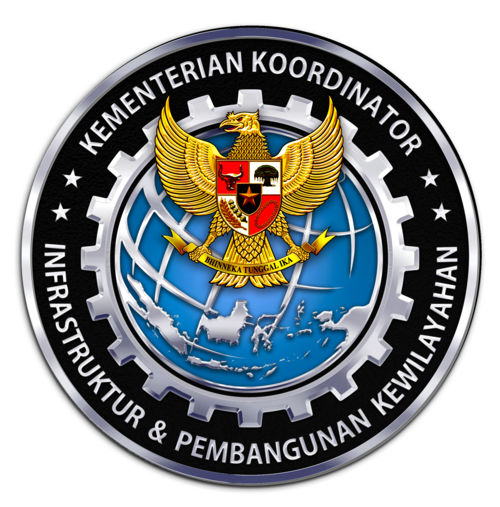

Ministry overview
- Formed: 18 February 1960 (first iteration); 20 October 2024 (announcement); 5 November 2024
- Preceding agencies: Deputy III (Coordination for Infrastructure and Transportation Affairs), Coordinating Ministry for Maritime and Investment Affairs; Deputy VI (Coordination for Areal Development and Spatial Planning), Coordinating Ministry for Economic Affairs; Assistant Deputyship of Manpower Productivity Enhancement, Deputy IV (Coordination for Digital Economy, Manpower, and SMBEs), Coordinating Ministry for Economic Affairs; Assistant Deputyship of Manpower Ecosystem Harmonization, Deputy IV (Coordination for Digital Economy, Manpower, and SMBEs), Coordinating Ministry for Economic Affairs; Assistant Deputyship of Regional Development Equity, Deputy II (Coordination of Regional Development Equity and Disaster Management), Coordinating Ministry for Human Development and Cultural Affairs; Assistant Deputyship of Regional Empowerment and Spatial Mobility, Deputy II (Coordination of Regional Development Equity and Disaster Management), Coordinating Ministry for Human Development and Cultural Affairs
- Jurisdiction: Government of Indonesia
- Headquarters: Jl. MH. Thamrin No.8 Central Jakarta Jakarta, Indonesia
- Minister responsible: Agus Harimurti Yudhoyono, Coordinating Minister
- Website: kemenkoinfra.go.id

The Coordinating Ministry for Infrastructure and Regional Development (Note: Indonesian: Kementerian Koordinator Bidang Infrastruktur dan Pembangunan Kewilayahan, abbreviated as Kemenko Infrabangwil.) is an Indonesian government ministry in charge of planning and policy coordination, as well as synchronization of policies in the field of infrastructure and regional development. The ministry is led by a Coordinating Minister, which is currently held by Agus Harimurti Yudhoyono since 21 October 2024. This coordinating ministry is the direct successor of the Coordinating Ministry for Maritime and Investment Affairs.

== History ==
Policy coordination for regional development was domain of Department of Development that established 18 February 1960 during President Sukarno's Second Working Cabinet. It existed until 23 November 1963, when it was elevated into Coordinating Minister-level Compartment Ministry for Development during Fourth Working Cabinet, and remained exist until 25 July 1966 when Second Revised Dwikora Cabinet disestablished and the post completely removed in Ampera Cabinet.

The present and current iteration of the ministry is the result of the breakup of the Coordinating Ministry for Maritime and Investment Affairs, and rearrangement of the coordinating ministryship during President Prabowo administration. Thru Presidential Decree No. 145/2024, the coordinating ministry for regional development re-established with also had infrastructure coordination added as well, which was domain of Coordinating Ministry for Economic Affairs during President Joko Widodo's previous administration.

== Organization ==
Based on the Presidential Decree No. 145/2024 and as expanded by the Coordinating Minister for Infrastructure and Regional Development Decree No. 1/2024, the Coordinating Ministry for Infrastructure and Regional Development is organized into the following:

- Office of the Coordinating Minister for Infrastructure and Regional Development
- Office of the Deputy Coordinating Minister for Infrastructure and Regional Development
- Coordinating Ministry Secretariat
  - Bureau of Performance Management and Partnerships
  - Bureau of Legal Affairs, Human Resources, and Organization
  - Bureau of Data, Communication, and Public Information
  - Bureau of General Affairs and Finance
    - Division of Protocols and Leadership Administration
      - Subdivision of Protocols
      - Subdivision of Coordinating Minister Administration
      - Subdivision of Coordinating Minister Secretariat Administration
      - Subdivision of Coordinating Minister Board of Experts and Special Staffs Administration
    - Division of Household Affairs and Procurement
      - Subdivision of Household Affairs and State Properties
      - Subdivision of Procurement
- Inspectorate
- Deputy for Equality in Regional, Agrarian, and Spatial Development Coordination (Deputy I)
  - Deputy I Secretariat
  - Assistant Deputy for Coordination of Regional Development Equity, Agrarian, and Spatial Management
  - Assistant Deputy for Spatial Management Administration and Agrarian Management
  - Assistant Deputy for Regional Development Equity, Region I (Sumatra, Jawa, Bali)
  - Assistant Deputy for Regional Development Equity, Region II (Nusa Tenggaras, Kalimantan, Sulawesi, Maluku Islands, and Papua)
  - Assistant Deputy for Development Acceleration of Villages and Transmigration Areas
  - Assistant Deputy for Development Acceleration of Outer Islands, Coastal Regions, Frontier Lands, Outer Areas, and Disadvantaged Areas
- Deputy for Connectivity Coordination (Deputy II)
  - Deputy II Secretariat
  - Assistant Deputy for Interregional Connectivity Development
  - Assistant Deputy for Terrestrial Connectivity and Railways
  - Assistant Deputy for Maritime and Air Connectivity
  - Assistant Deputy for Sustainable Connectivity
  - Assistant Deputy for Connectivity Supporting Facilities and Infrastructures
- Deputy for Basic Infrastructure Coordination (Deputy III)
  - Deputy III Secretariat
  - Assistant Deputy for Basic Strategic Infrastructures
  - Assistant Deputy for Public and Social Infrastructures
  - Assistant Deputy for Water Resources and Food Infrastructures
  - Assistant Deputy for Energy and Telecommunication Infrastructures
  - Assistant Deputy for Economics and Industrial Infrastructures
- Deputy for Housing, Residential Facilities, and Residential Infrastructures Development Coordination (Deputy IV)
  - Deputy IV Secretariat
  - Assistant Deputy for Improvement of Housing Accessibility
  - Assistant Deputy for Facilitation of Housing Areas
  - Assistant Deputy for Development and Management of Settlement Areas
  - Assistant Deputy for Funding of Housing and Settlement Areas
  - Assistant Deputy for Development of Transmigration Housing and Disadvantaged Areas
- Board of Experts
  - Senior Expert to the Minister on Regional Development
  - Senior Expert to the Minister on Sustainable Development and Digital Transformation
- Special Staffs
  - Special Staff to the Minister on Management and Inter-institutional Partnership
  - Special Staff to the Minister on Law and Regulations
  - Special Staff to the Minister on Development Acceleration
  - Special Staff to the Minister on Communication and Public Information
  - Special Staff to the Minister on NGO Partnership and International Partnership

== Coordinated agencies ==
Based on the Presidential Decree No. 145/2024, these ministries are placed under the coordinating ministry:

- Ministry of Agrarian Affairs and Spatial Planning
- Ministry of Public Works
- Ministry of Housing and Residential Area
- Ministry of Transmigration
- Ministry of Transportation
