= Pohan =

Batak surname originating in Indonesia

Pohan is one of Toba Batak clans originating in North Sumatra, Indonesia. People of this clan bear the clan's name as their surname. Notable people of this clan include:

- Amir Yusuf Pohan (born 1971), Indonesian footballer
- Annisa Pohan (born 1981), Indonesian actress, model, and presenter
- David Yedija Pohan (born 1978), Indonesian badminton player
- Zainul Arifin Pohan (1909-1963), Indonesian politician
