= Jim Knowlton =

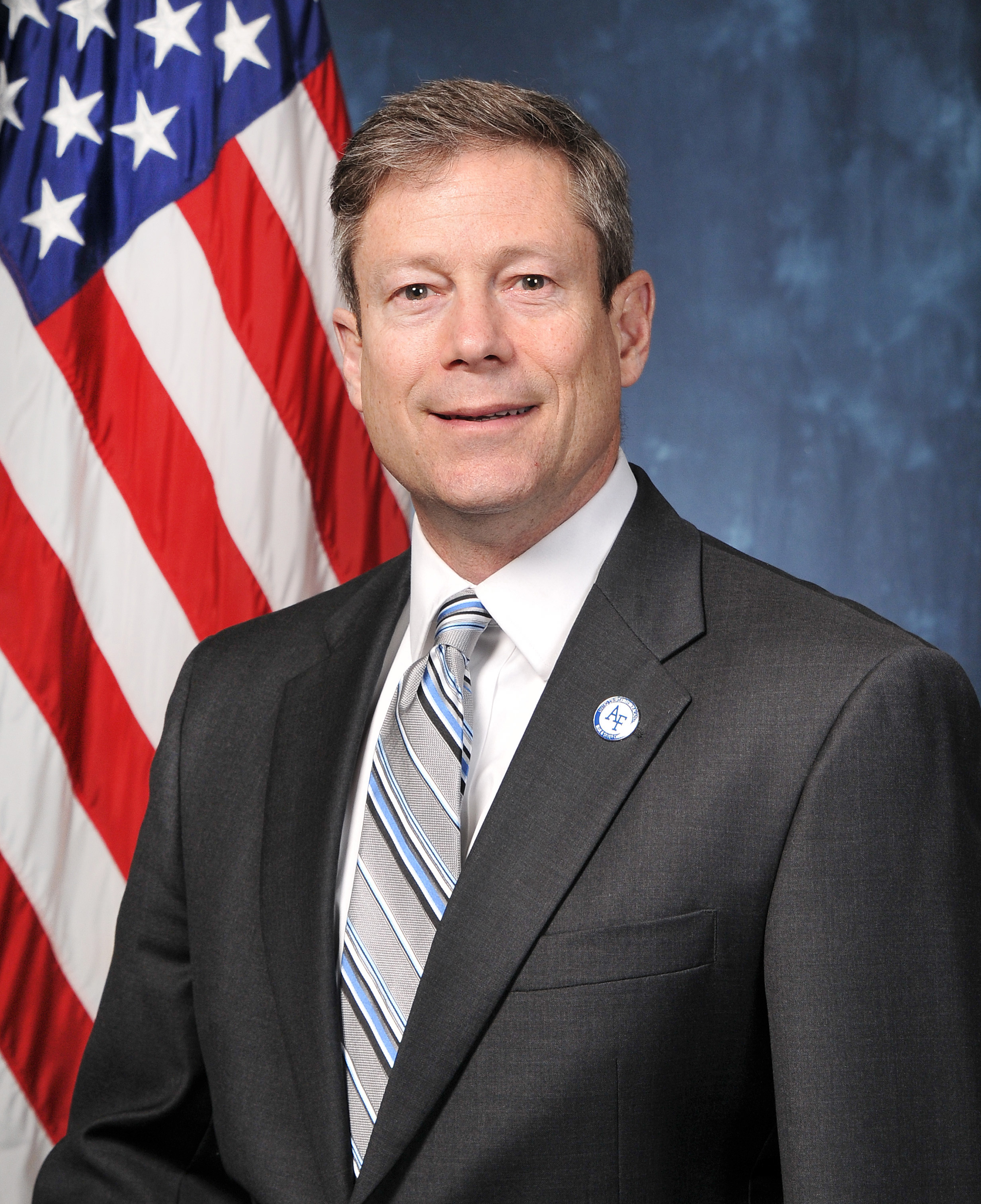

Biographical details
- Born: 1960 (age 65–66)

Playing career

Men's ice hockey
- 1978–1982: Army
- Position: Forward

Administrative career (AD unless noted)
- 2003–2006: Army (deputy AD)
- 2008–2015: RPI
- 2015–2018: Air Force
- 2018–2025: California

James Arthur Knowlton (born 1960) is an American college athletics administrator and civil engineer who is the former director of athletics for the University of California, Berkeley. Previously, Knowlton served as the athletic director for the United States Air Force Academy and Rensselaer Polytechnic Institute.

Originally from Burlington, Massachusetts, Knowlton graduated from the United States Military Academy at West Point in 1982, where he studied engineering and played on the Army Black Knights men's ice hockey team. Knowlton then served in the United States Army, rising to commander and later assistant director at the Army Corps of Engineers. He retired from the Army in 2008 at the rank of colonel.

Beginning in 2003 as deputy athletics director at Army, Knowlton worked as a college athletics administrator. Knowlton later was athletics director at Rensselaer Polytechnic Institute from 2008 to 2013, the U.S. Air Force Academy from 2015 to 2018, and the University of California, Berkeley from 2018 to 2025.

== Early life and education ==
Knowlton grew up in Burlington, Massachusetts, and graduated from Austin Preparatory School in 1978. Knowlton completed a bachelor's degree in engineering from the United States Military Academy (West Point) in 1982. While attending West Point, Knowlton played at forward on West Point's Army Black Knights men's ice hockey team.

== Military and academic career ==
After graduating from West Point, Knowlton served in the United States Army, first in the 9th Engineer Battalion stationed in Aschaffenburg, West Germany as platoon leader, executive officer, and company commander. After completing the Armor Officer Advanced Course, Knowlton returned to Germany to command the 42nd Engineer Company, Berlin Brigade. After completing a master's degree in civil engineering at the Cornell University College of Engineering, Knowlton joined the West Point civil and mechanical engineering department faculty in 1992. In 1994, Knowlton attended the United States Army Command and General Staff College, after which he returned to active Army duty as assistant division engineer and operations officer for the 307th Engineer Battalion, 82nd Airborne Division. Knowlton was later assigned to The Pentagon, first as military aide to the Under Secretary of the Army Joe R. Reeder and later as assistant director at the Army Corps of Engineers headquarters. Beginning in 1999, Knowlton led a 750-strong battalion at Fort Carson in Colorado. He followed that assignment with a stint as joint exercise branch chief for Air Force Space Command and deploying to Iraq. In the Army, Knowlton earned the Legion of Merit, Meritorious Service Medal with four oak leaf clusters, Ranger Tab, Air Assault Badge, and Senior Parachutist Badge.

Knowlton is also a registered professional engineer in Virginia.

== Athletics administration career ==
From 2003 to 2006, Knowlton was deputy athletic director for the Army Black Knights athletic programs of his alma mater United States Military Academy. Knowlton stepped down from that position in 2006 to direct the Center for Enhanced Performance on campus.

In 2008, Knowlton became athletic director at Rensselaer Polytechnic Institute (RPI), an NCAA Division III school. Returning to the Division I level, Knowlton became the 11th athletic director at the United States Air Force Academy on March 22, 2015.

Knowlton was named athletic director at the University of California, Berkeley on April 9, 2018.

On August 2, 2021, Knowlton announced that he had agreed to an eight year extension with Cal, keeping him in Berkeley through 2029. Knowlton received the extension following his decision to give head football coach Justin Wilcox an extension through the 2023 season, his decision to hire Mark Fox as head men's basketball coach, and his decision to hire Charmin Smith as head women's basketball coach.

In May 2022, Knowlton was cited as having been dismissive of complaints against Cal head women's swim coach Teri McKeever, who was accused by current and former Cal swimmers of bullying, verbal, and emotional abuse. In June 2022, Knowlton received more pushback for telling current Cal swimmers and their families that the investigation into McKeever could take six months. Knowlton responded to this pushback saying he shares the concerns of the swimmers and their families.

McKeever was fired by Cal after an investigation that concluded in January 2023. That March, the university acknowledged that it would take steps beyond the firing, but declined to specify whether that included an investigation of Knowlton. Later that month, it was reported that the university had opened an investigation into both Knowlton and executive associate athletic director Jennifer Simon-O’Neill and their handling of student allegations against McKeever.

On March 29, 2023, Knowlton announced the hiring of Mark Madsen as the new head men's basketball coach at Cal. Madsen replaced Mark Fox, whom Knowlton hired four years earlier.

On April 6, 2023, Knowlton was accused of being dismissive of allegations of bullying against Cal women's soccer head coach Neil McGuire.

On June 16, 2025, it was announced that Knowlton would retire from his position as Cal's athletic director effective July 1, 2025.
