= Agus Harimurti Yudhoyono =

Indonesian politician (born 1978)

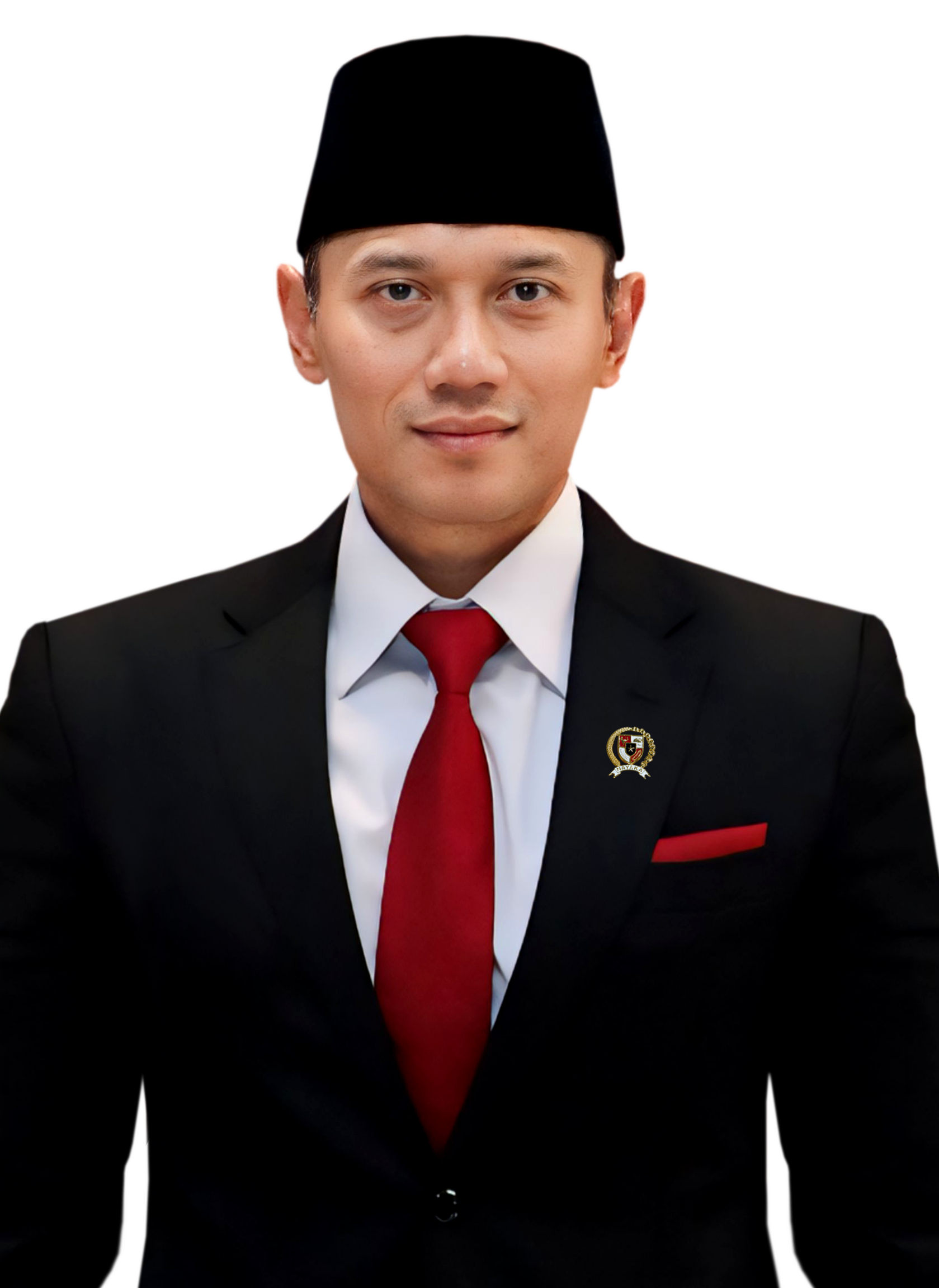
- Official portrait, 2024

Coordinating Minister for Infrastructure and Regional Development
- Incumbent
- Assumed office 21 October 2024
- President: Prabowo Subianto
- Preceded by: Hamengkubuwana IX (as Coordinating Minister in the Field of Development)

15th Minister of Agrarian Affairs and Spatial Planning
- In office 21 February 2024 – 20 October 2024
- President: Joko Widodo
- Preceded by: Hadi Tjahjanto
- Succeeded by: Nusron Wahid

5th General Chairman of Democratic Party
- Incumbent
- Assumed office 15 March 2020
- Preceded by: Susilo Bambang Yudhoyono

Personal details
- Born: 10 August 1978 (age 48) Bandung, Indonesia
- Party: Democratic (since 2016)
- Spouse: Annisa Pohan (m. 2005)
- Children: 2
- Parents: Susilo Bambang Yudhoyono (father); Ani Yudhoyono (mother)
- Relatives: Edhie Yudhoyono (brother); Aulia Pohan (father-in-law)
- Education: Taruna Nusantara
- Alma mater: Indonesian Military Academy; Nanyang Technological University (MSc); Harvard University (MPA); Western Hemisphere Institute for Security Cooperation; United States Army Command and General Staff College; Webster University (MA); Airlangga University (PhD)
- Occupation: Politician; army officer
- Website: agusyudhoyono.com
- Nickname: AHY

Military service
- Allegiance: Indonesia
- Branch/service: Indonesian Army
- Years of service: 2000–2016
- Rank: Major
- Unit: Infantry (Kostrad)
- Battles/wars: Insurgency in Aceh; Garuda Contingent
- Awards: Tri Sakti Wiratama; Adhi Makayasa

Agus Harimurti Yudhoyono (born 10 August 1978), commonly referred to as AHY, is an Indonesian politician and former army major who is currently serving as the leader of the Democratic Party. He is the current Coordinating Minister for Infrastructure and Development in President Prabowo Subianto's Red and White Cabinet. Serving in the Army from 2000 until 2016, he is the executive director of the Yudhoyono Institute and founder of the Agus Harimurti Yudhoyono Foundation. He is the son of former Indonesian president Susilo Bambang Yudhoyono, more commonly known as SBY.

Born on 10 August 1978, in Bandung, West Java, Agus graduated from the Indonesian Military Academy in 1999. During his time in the military, he undertook higher formal education. He received a Master of Science in Strategic Studies at Nanyang Technological University, Singapore in 2006, Master in Public Administration from Harvard University, United States in 2010, and Master of Arts in Leadership and Management from Webster University in the United States. While serving in the Army, AHY joined the security operations in Aceh in 2002 and UN peace operations in Lebanon in 2006. He also co-founded the Indonesian Defense University. In 2015, he led one of the Capital's security units. In 2016, he left the military and entered politics.

In 2016, he was appointed by the Democratic Party, the National Awakening Party (PKB), the United Development Party (PPP), and the National Mandate Party (PAN), to become a candidate for the 2017 Jakarta Governor election. Despite losing the election to Anies Baswedan, he remained active in politics. He commanded the Democratic Party's Joint Task Command (Kogasma) in Indonesia's 2019 General Election. On early 2019 he targeted to achieve 15 percent of national vote, but later he revised the target to achieve 10 percent of national vote. He was then given a new position as Deputy chairman of the Democratic Party. He was also elected to be the leader of the Democratic Party by acclamation on 15 March 2020.

On 21 February 2024, he was appointed Minister of Agrarian Affairs and Spatial Planning by President Joko Widodo, then served as Coordinating Minister of Infrastructure and Regional Development since 21 October 2024.

== Early life, family, and education ==
=== Early life and family ===
Agus Harimurti Yudhoyono was born on 10 August 1978, in Bandung, West Java. His father is Susilo Bambang Yudhoyono, the 6th President of the Republic of Indonesia and former General of the Armed Forces. While his mother is Kristiani Herrawati, more commonly known as Ani Yudhoyono. He is also the grandson of Lt. Gen. (ret.) Sarwo Edhie Wibowo (1925–1989), who was the father of his mother. He also has one younger brother, Edhie Baskoro Yudhoyono, born in 1980.

During his childhood, he moved and lived in numbers of places, following his father's duties and education as an army officer. He spent most of his childhood in East Timor when his father took up military service there.

=== Education ===
==== Early education ====
From 1984 to 1988, he studied at the Kuntum Wijaya Kusuma Elementary School, in Pasar Rebo, East Jakarta. From 1988 to 1991 he attended David J. Brewer School, Leavenworth, Kansas. In 1991, AHY continued his study at SMPN 5 Bandung.

In 1994, AHY was admitted to the prestigious Taruna Nusantara High School in Magelang. Here, he showed exceptional leadership qualities and was elected president of the student body. He later graduated as valedictorian with the best overall performance, securing an award called Garuda Trisakti Tarunatama.

==== Higher education ====
He is an Indonesian Military Academy graduate. During his first and second years at the Military Academy, he won the Tri Sakti Wiratama award given for collective achievements in academic, physical and personal personality. he was commander of the Youth Corps Regiment in 1999. There, he also joined the Drum band Canka Lokananta Military Academy as a bass drummer, (who is often referred to as "Tidar Tiger"). AHY then passed AKMIL with the best graduate and awarded Bintang Adi Makayasa in December 2000.

During his assignment in the military as an officer, AHY also undertook formal higher education. AHY has three Masters education degrees: Master of Science in Strategic Studies at Nanyang Technological University, Singapore in 2006, Master in Public Administration from Harvard University, United States in 2010, and Master of Arts in Leadership and Management from Webster University in the United States, won the title of summa cum laude in 2015 with the GPA of 4.0.

In 2021, he enrolled for Ph.D. in Human Resources Development Management at Airlangga University. In 2023, he successfully completed his Ph.D. Dissertation proposal titled "Transformational Leadership and Human Resources Development Orchestration towards 2045 Advanced Indonesia". However, due to the 2024 Indonesian general election, he took study leave for almost a year, and continued his studies after the election. He graduated on 7 October 2024 from Airlangga after defending his dissertation.

== Military service ==
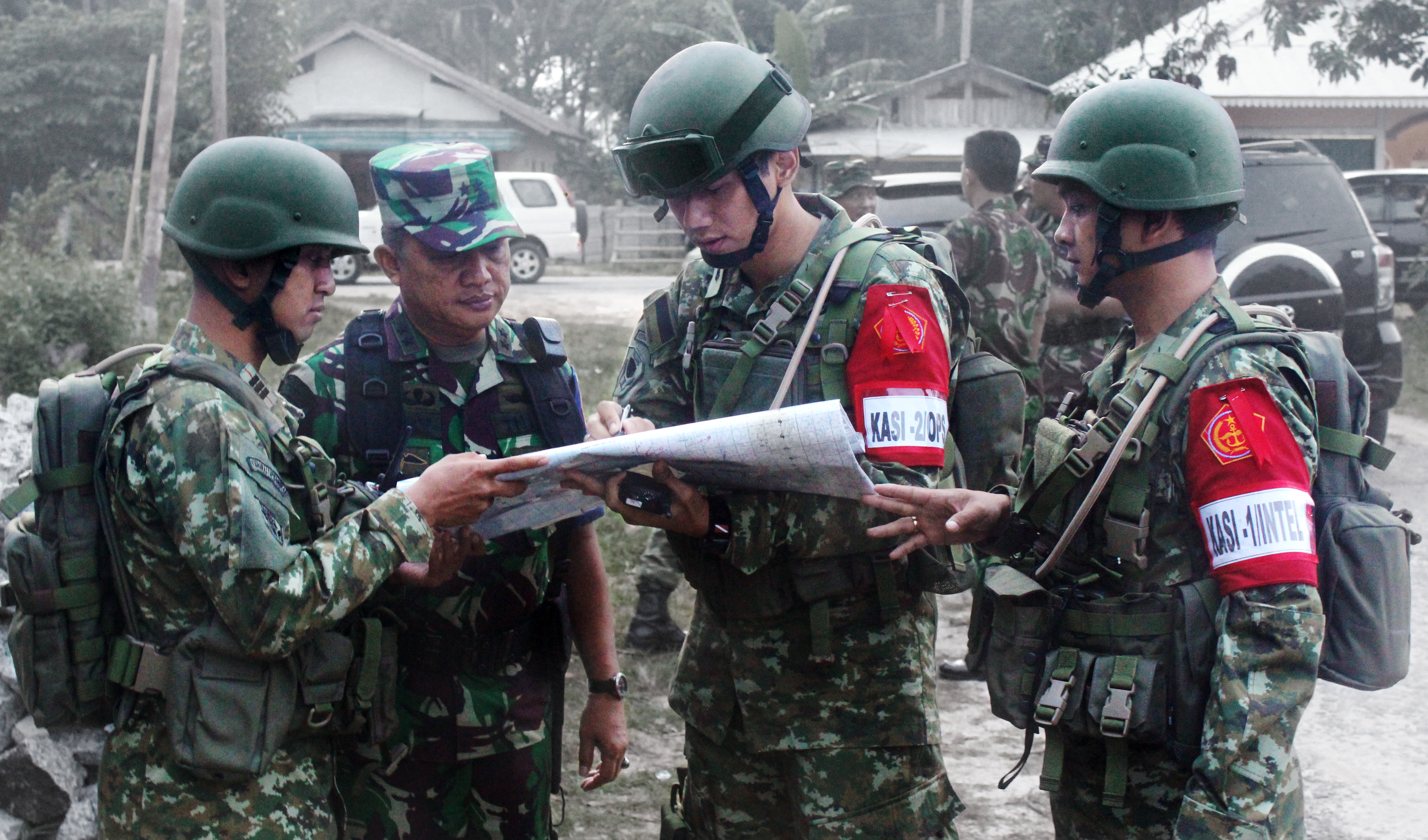
AHY on Military assignment

Yudhoyono served the Indonesian National Army, starting as a platoon commander in the Operations section to the company commander in the elite unit of the 305 Kostrad Airborne Infantry Battalion.

After graduating from the Military Academy, AHY attended the Infantry Branching School and the Intel Combat Course in 2001. He later joined the Army Strategic Reserve Command (Kostrad). In 2002, AHY was assigned as a platoon commander in the 305th Airborne Infantry Battalion, 17th Airborne Raider Infantry Brigade, Kostrad 1st Infantry Division. That time, he was sent to Aceh for a risky task in the Security Restoration Operation. In Aceh, AHY was chosen as the Commander of the Special Team.

After leading the special forces in Operation Security Restoration in Aceh, in November 2006, AHY assumed the task of serving as a Garuda XXIII-A contingent operations section officer in maintaining peace along the Israeli and Southern Lebanese borders, when Israel and Hezbollah were involved in 2006 Lebanon War. This contingent is the first Indonesian contingent sent for a UN peace mission in Lebanon (UNIFIL). During his assignment, AHY initiated the smart car program as a means of reducing the impact of the trauma of war on children. For this initiative, AHY was awarded the Army Service Distinction Medal from the leadership of the Lebanese Armed Forces.This contingent is the first Indonesian contingent sent for a UN peace mission in Lebanon (UNIFIL). During his assignment, AHY initiated the smart car program as a means of reducing the impact of the trauma of war on children. For this initiative, AHY was awarded the Army Service Distinction Medal from the leadership of the Lebanese Armed Forces. As field experience gained, AHY was promoted as company commander (Danki) at 305th Airborne Raider Infantry Battalion in 2007. In the same year, he attended the Indonesian Navy Scuba Divers course in the Thousand Islands. In 2008 AHY received an award as the best Company Commander in the Kostrad 1 Infantry Division, at the Joint Training of the Yudha Siaga TNI in Sangata.

Later that year, AHY was asked for his contribution by Minister of Defense, Juwono Sudarsono, to join the initiation of the Indonesian Defense University. AHY then continued his military education at the US Army Maneuver Captain Career Course at Fort Benning, United States in 2011 and became the best graduate. He also won the Order of Saint Maurice medal from the National Infantry Association.

Returning to Indonesia, he served as the Head of Operations Section (Kasiops) at the 17th Airborne Raider Infantry Brigade. In 2013, he was assigned as a Post-Graduate Lecturer, in the Defense Management program, the Indonesian Defense University. In 2015, AHY returned to US to join another military academy, and later won the title summa cum laude from the US Army Command and General Staff College at Fort Leavenworth, Kansas. Until early 2016, AHY was assigned as the commander of 203 Arya Kamuning Mechanical Infantry Battalion, 1st Infantry Brigade, one of the elite security forces of the Jakarta.

== Professional career ==
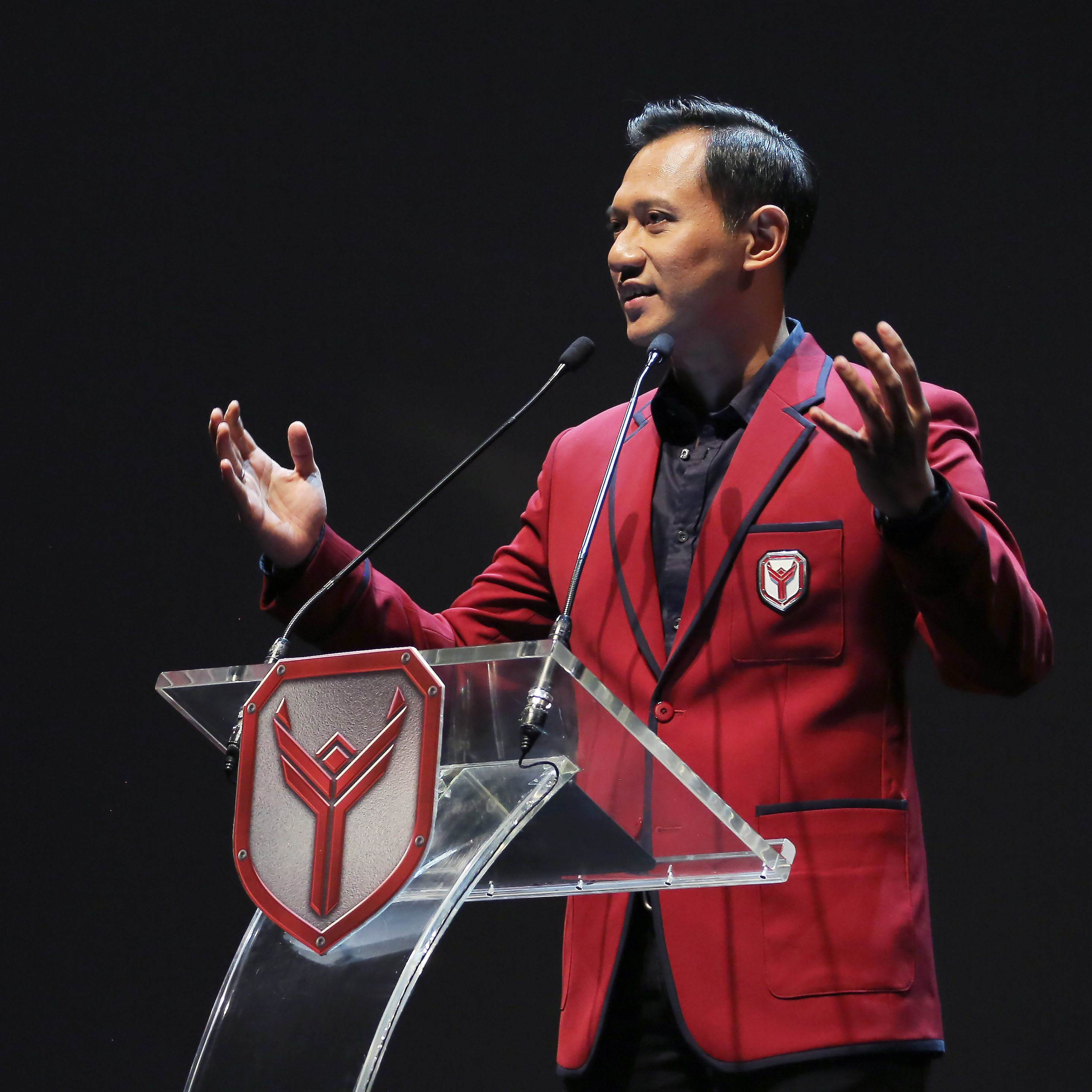
Yudhoyono speaking at a Yudhoyono Institute event

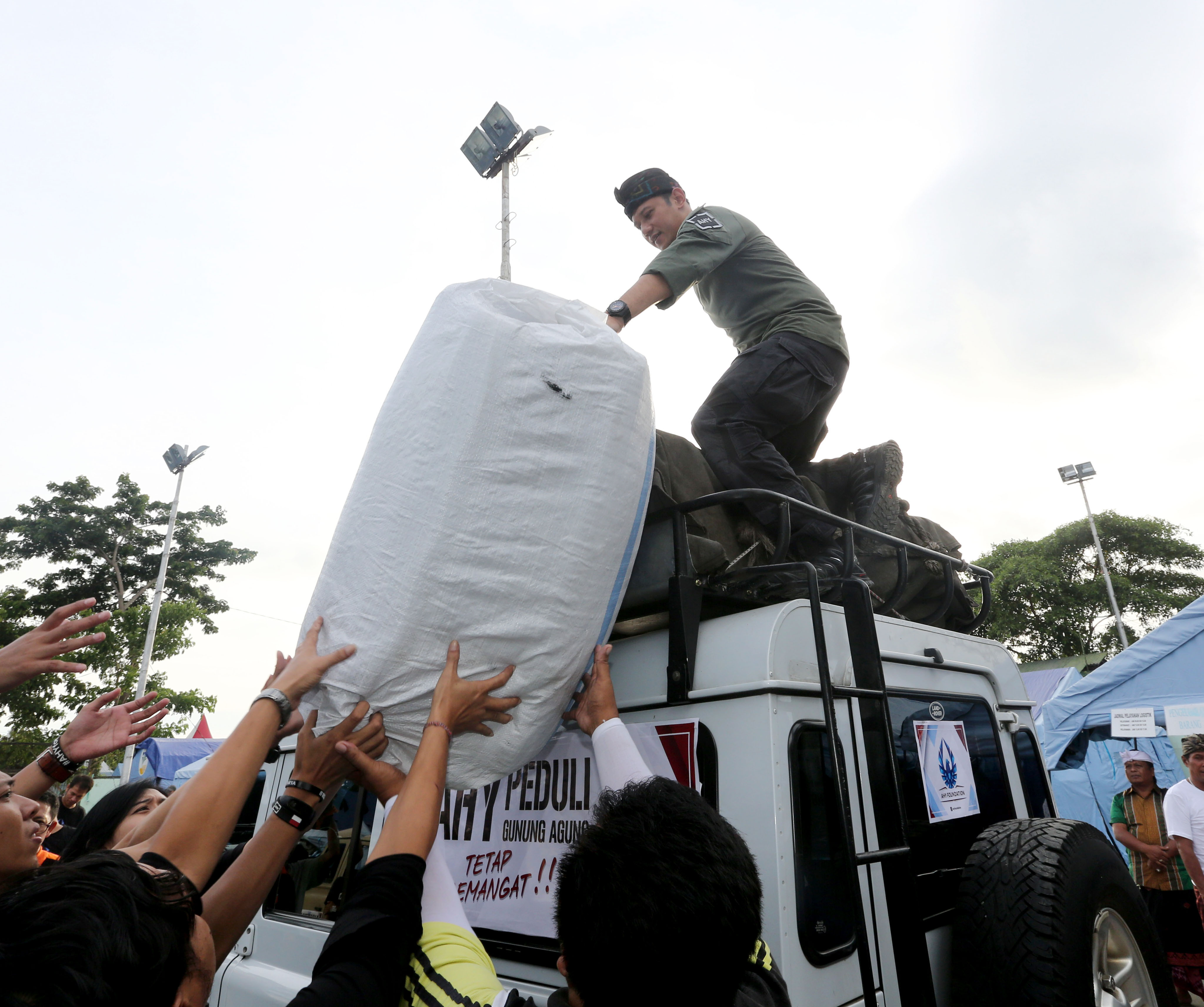
AHY Foundation

On 10 August 2017, AHY founded The Yudhoyono Institute, a think tank based on three pillars: Liberty, Prosperity, Security. As executive director, AHY initiated various programs to welcome and prepare the Indonesian golden generation, the target of which was achieved in 100 years of Indonesian Independence, in 2045. Through TYI, AHY often holds various activities such as: Roundtable Discussion to discuss various challenges and issues facing the Indonesian people and the world with experts and statesmen; People's Dialogue is carried out to absorb the aspirations of people in various regions from various circles; and public lectures on campuses and educational institutions throughout the archipelago, from Banda Aceh to Jayapura. He continuously shares inspiration, knowledge and experience with academics, students and youths. Together with The Yudhoyono Institute, AHY also formed the AHY Foundation, which focuses on social and humanitarian issues, especially health, education and the environment as well as disaster response. AHY Foundation is active in providing assistance to disaster victims such as in Palu, Lombok, Gunung Agung Bali, Pacitan floods and Gunung Kidul, Yogyakarta. In addition, through the AHY Foundation, he also initiated blood donor programs, tree and coral reef planting programs in various regions in Indonesia.

== Political career ==
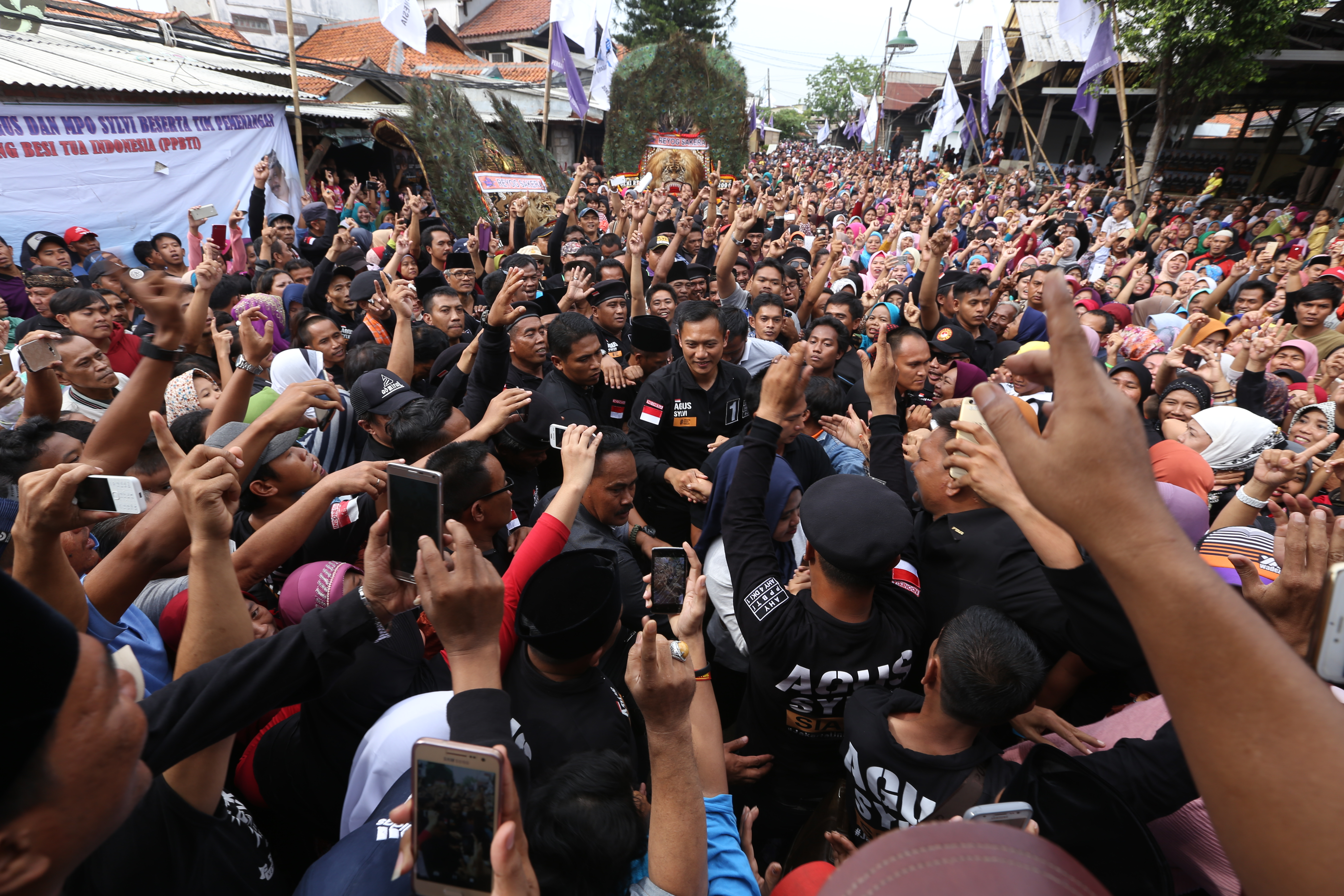
the 2017 Jakarta gubernatorial election

=== 2017 Jakarta gubernatorial election ===
AHY began his political career as a candidate for DKI Jakarta governor in the 2017 Jakarta gubernatorial election. With the support of a coalition formed by 4 political parties: the Democratic Party, the National Awakening Party (PKB), the United Development Party (PPP), and the National Mandate Party (PAN). In his very first election, he was paired with an experienced local bureaucrat, Syliviana Murni.

The Agus-Sylvi challenged the incumbent Basuki Tjahja Purnama-Djarot Saiful Hidayat (Ahok-Djarot) and Anies Baswedan-Sandiaga Uno (Anies-Sandi). Agus-Sylvi gets sequence number 1, Ahok-Djarot gets sequence number 2, and Anies-Sandi gets sequence number 3. AHY was defeated on the election, garnering only 17.02% of the votes.

=== 2019 General Election ===
On 17 February 2018, Democratic Party Chairperson Susilo Bambang Yudhoyono (SBY) confirmed AHY as Commander of the Joint Task Force (Kogasma) for the 2018 Head of Region Election (Pemilukada) and 2019 General Election.

He became a Democratic Party campaigner and he consolidated cadres in the region to win candidates nominated by the Democratic Party in the 2018 General Election. The Democratic Party succeeded in achieving the initial target of 35 percent from 171 elections.

In the 2019 elections, the Presidential Elections (Pilpres) and Legislative Elections (Pileg) were held simultaneously. At the 2019 Presidential Election, the Democratic Party formed a coalition with the political party supporting Prabowo-Sandi. In the 2019 Legislative election, the Democratic Party targeted 15 percent of the total number of seats in the Indonesian Parliament.

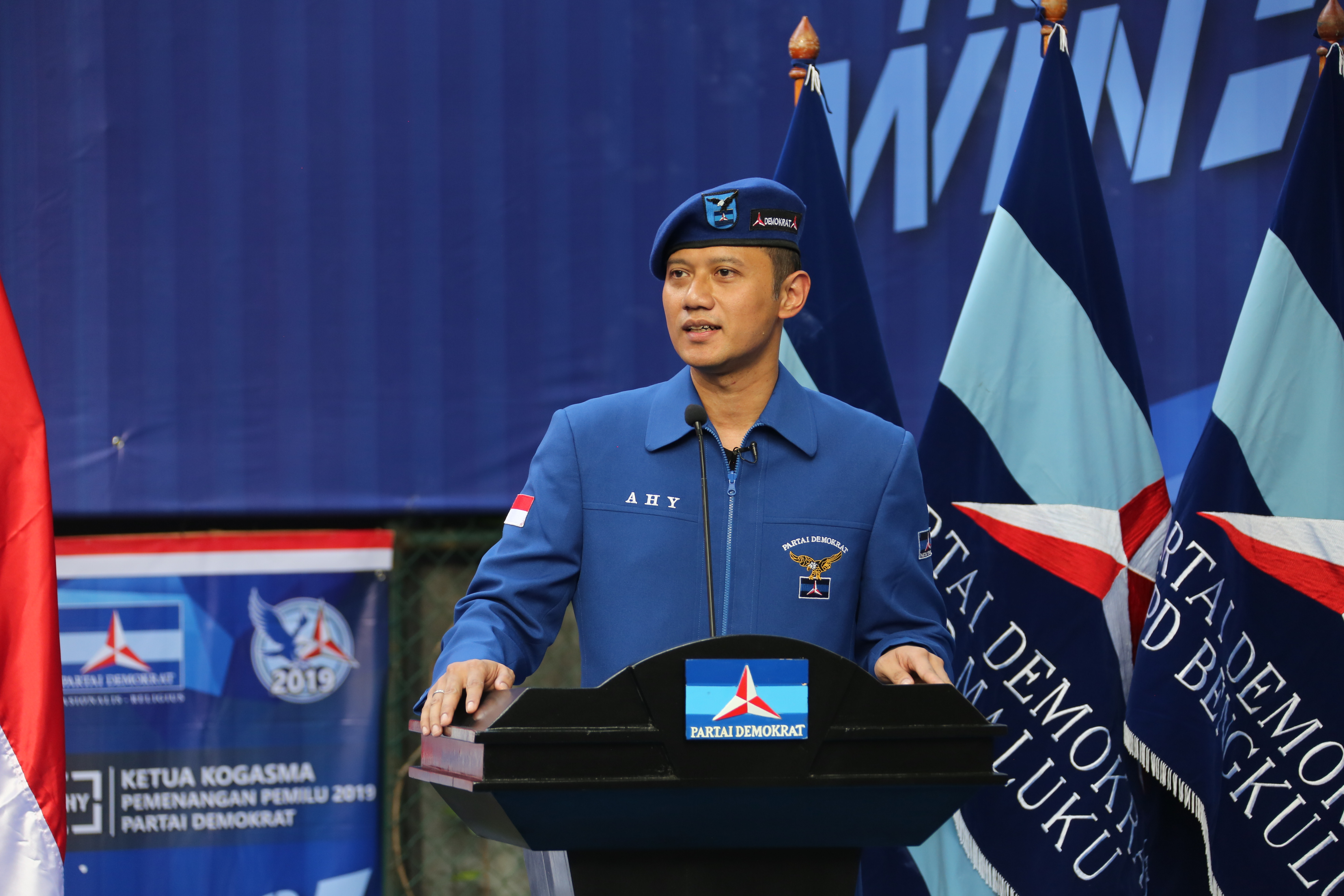
KOGASMA

AHY as Commander of Kogasma led the efforts to bring victory for the Democratic Party. In the 2019 legislative election, the Democratic Party in various surveys is predicted to only be able to win less than 5 percent of the vote. Under his leadership the Democratic Party was able to win 10,876,507 votes (7.77 percent), exceeding the predictions of various surveys, though it failed to achieve the party target of 10 percent.

=== Post-2019 General Election ===
For his achievements, in October 2019 AHY was appointed as Deputy Chairman of the Democratic Party. AHY is expected to be able to bring the Democratic Party towards better and progressive change. AHY was elected as the leader of the Democratic Party on 15 March 2020, replacing his father.

His leadership of the party was tested when Chief of Presidential Staff Moeldoko attempted to oust AHY from the party leadership by holding an extraordinary party congress in Deli Serdang. Despite the odds, AHY was able to come out to maintain the existence of the party by maintaining internal solidity and quick decision making.

Based on the Saiful Mujani Research and Consulting (SMRC) survey in May 2023, AHY has high electability to become a partner or potential Vice Presidential Candidate from the three existing Bacapres candidates, both Prabowo Subianto, Ganjar Pranowo, and Anies Rasyid Baswedan.

=== 2024 General Election ===
Ahead of the election in 2024, AHY and the Democratic Party initially backed Anies Rasyid Baswedan as the next president on 2 March 2023 and joined the Coalition of Change which comprised the NasDem and Prosperous Justice Party (PKS). AHY hoped to work with Anies as a vice presidential candidate as he claimed Anies sent a letter to him asking to be his running mate. However shockingly, Anies selected Muhaimin Iskandar from the National Awakening Party (PKB) after the latter left Prabowo Subianto's Advanced Indonesia Coalition. As the result of Muhaimin's appointment as Anies' running mate, AHY and the Democratic Party withdrew their support and left their coalition.

After their exit, the Democratic Party was approached by PDI-P who is hoping for AHY to back Ganjar Pranowo as Hasto Kristiyanto claimed intense communications are underway. The Democrats also got approached by the Advanced Indonesia Coalition as Prabowo held a meeting together with his father in Cikeas. After many considerations, on 21 September 2023 in Jakarta Convention Center, AHY and the Democratic Party declared to back Prabowo Subianto in his presidential campaign.

=== Minister of Agrarian Affairs and Spatial Planning ===
On 21 February 2024, AHY was appointed as Indonesia's Minister of Agrarian Affairs and Spatial Planning and Head of the National Land Agency by President Joko Widodo at the State Palace. AHY's inauguration was based on Presidential Decree Number 34/P of 2024 concerning the Dismissal and Appointment of State Ministers in the Advanced Indonesian Cabinet for the 2019-2024 period which was stipulated by President Joko Widodo in Jakarta, on February 20 2024. AHY assumed the position to fill in the position after his predecessor, Hadi Tjahjanto, was also inaugurated on the same day with AHY as Coordinating Minister for Political, Legal, and Security Affairs to replace Hadi's predecessor, Mahfud MD.

=== Coordinating Minister of Infrastructure and Regional Development ===
He was appointed as Coordinating Minister of Infrastructure and Regional Development in President Prabowo's Red and White Cabinet since the cabinet inauguration.

== Personal life ==
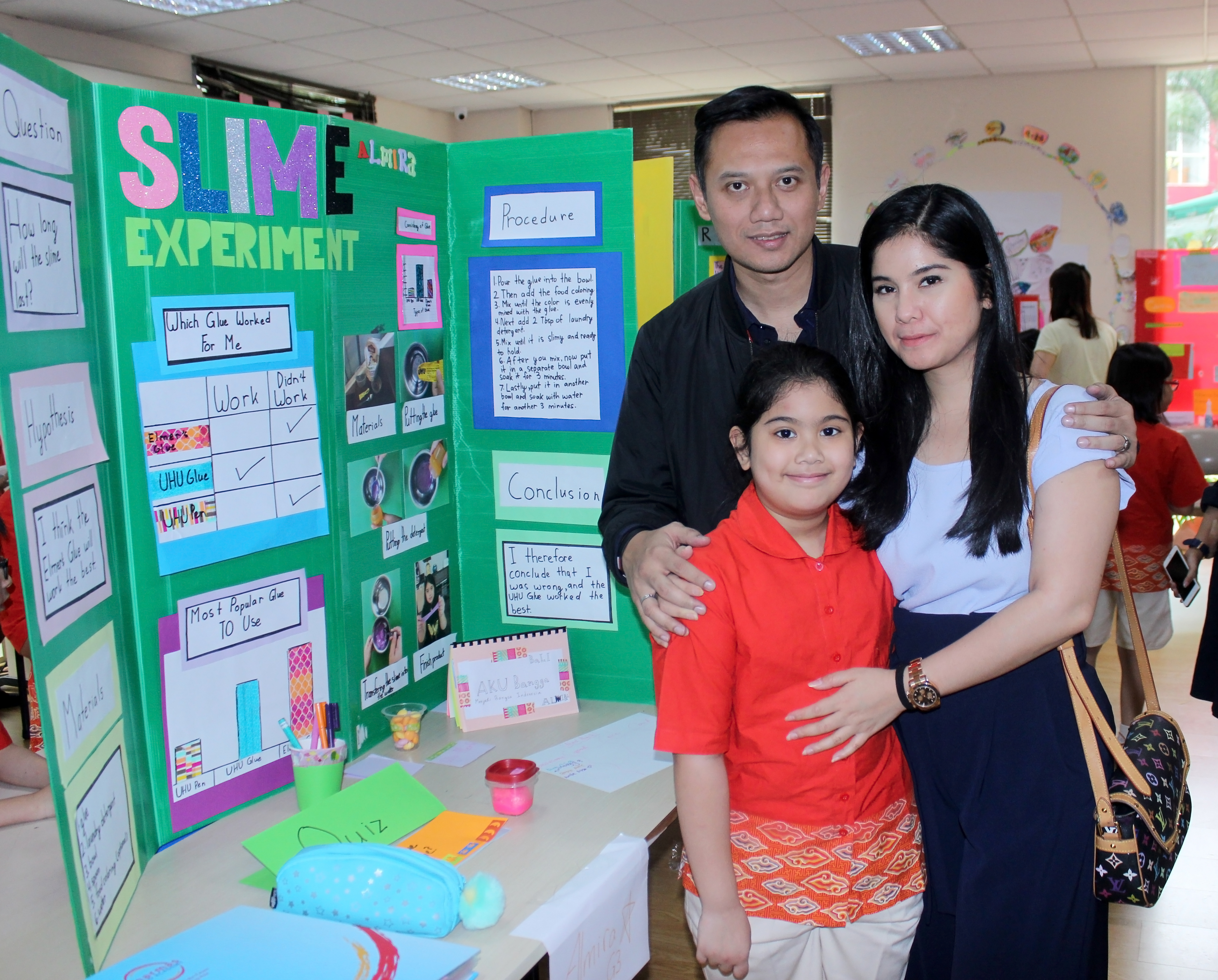
AHY and his family

On 8 July 2005, AHY married Annisa Larasati Pohan, former radio announcer who had been the cover girl (Gadis Sampul) of 1997. Annisa Pohan is the daughter of former Indonesian Bank (BI) Deputy governor, Aulia Pohan. When married, AHY was an officer with the rank of First lieutenant, at that time he was 27 years old, and Annisa was 24 years old. Annisa is also a Co-founder of Tunggadewi Foundation.

At their wedding, they used Javanese customs which were laden with military style by carrying out the Pora Sword tradition. Their wedding reception was held at Bogor Presidential Palace and attended by 2,000 invited guests. Their daughter, Almira Tunggadewi, was born on 17 August 2008.

== Honors and awards ==
=== Honors ===
==== National honors ====
- Indonesia:
  - Star of Mahaputera, 3rd Class (Bintang Mahaputera Utama) (2025)
  - Star of Mahaputera, 4th Class (Bintang Mahaputera Nararya) (2024)
  - Medal of Pioneership (Medali Kepeloporan) (2011)
  - Medal for Providing an Example of Meritorious Personality (Satyalancana Wira Karya) (2014)
  - Medal for Presidential and Vice Presidential Guards Personnel (Satyalancana Wira Siaga) (2014)
  - Armed Forces Long Service Medal, 4th Class (Satyalancana Kesetiaan 8 Tahun) (2008)
  - Medal for Active International Military Duty (Satyalancana Shanti Dharma) (2007)
  - Medal for National Defense Service (Satyalancana Dharma Nusa) (2003)

==== Foreign honors ====
- United States:
  - Recipient of the Order of Saint Maurice (2011)
- Lebanon:
  - Army Service Distinction Medal (2007)
- United Nations:
  - UN Peacekeeping Distinction Medal (2007)

=== Honorary appointments ===
- South Korea: Honorary member of the 707th Special Mission Battalion, Republic of Korea Army Special Warfare Command (2013)

=== Awards ===
- Nanyang Distinguished Alumni Award, Nanyang Technological University (NTU) (2025).
- Kartika Astha Brata Utama, Institut Pemerintahan Dalam Negeri (2025).
- RMOL Democracy Award, Rakyat Merdeka Online (2017)
- JCI Ten Outstanding Young Persons (TOYP), Junior Chamber International (2017)
- Bintang Adi Makayasa (2000)
- Sword of Trisakti Wiratama, Military Academy (2000)
- Bintang Garuda Trisakti Tarunatama Emas, Taruna Nusantara High School (1997)
- Nanyang Outstanding Young Alumni Award, Nanyang Technological University (2012)
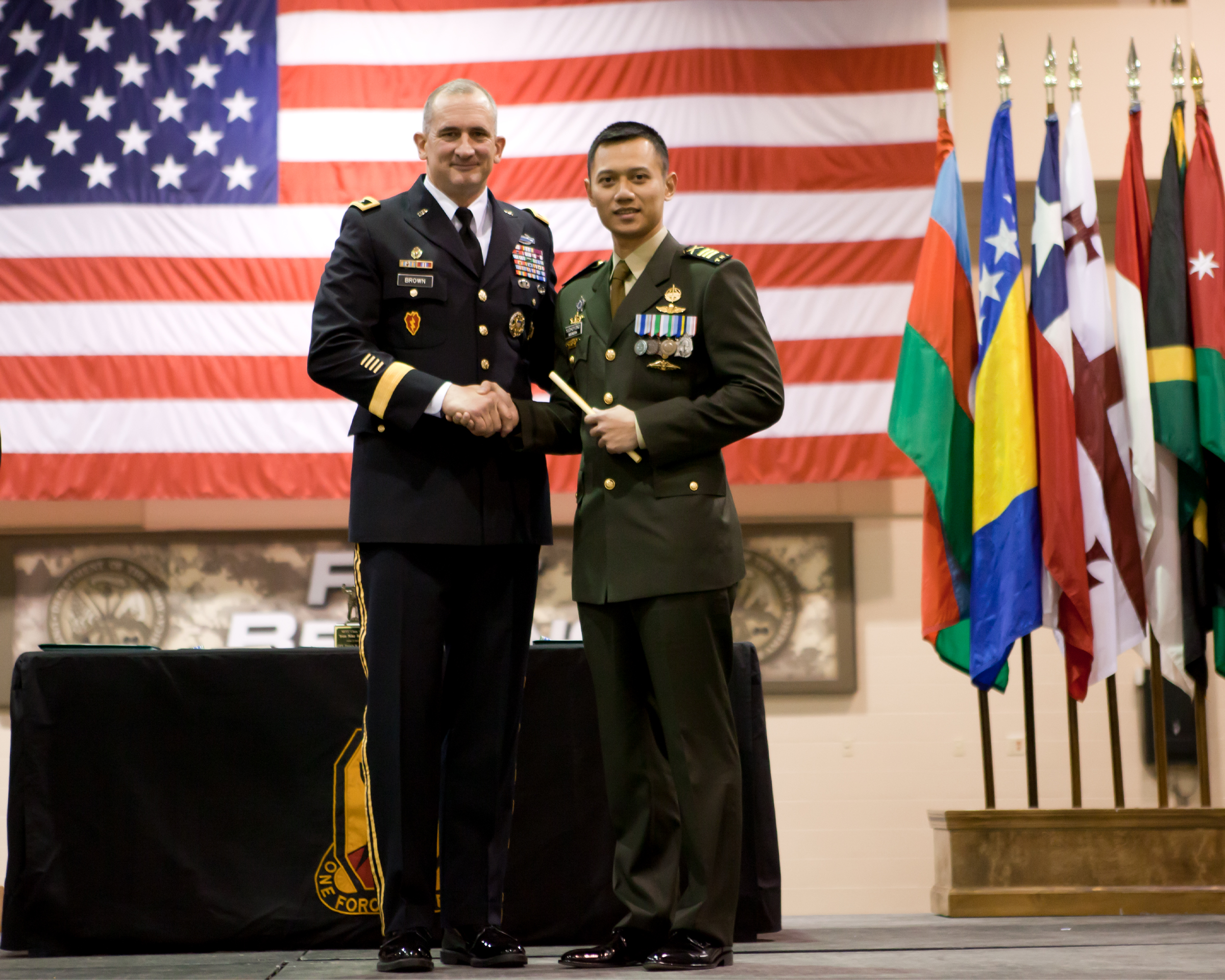

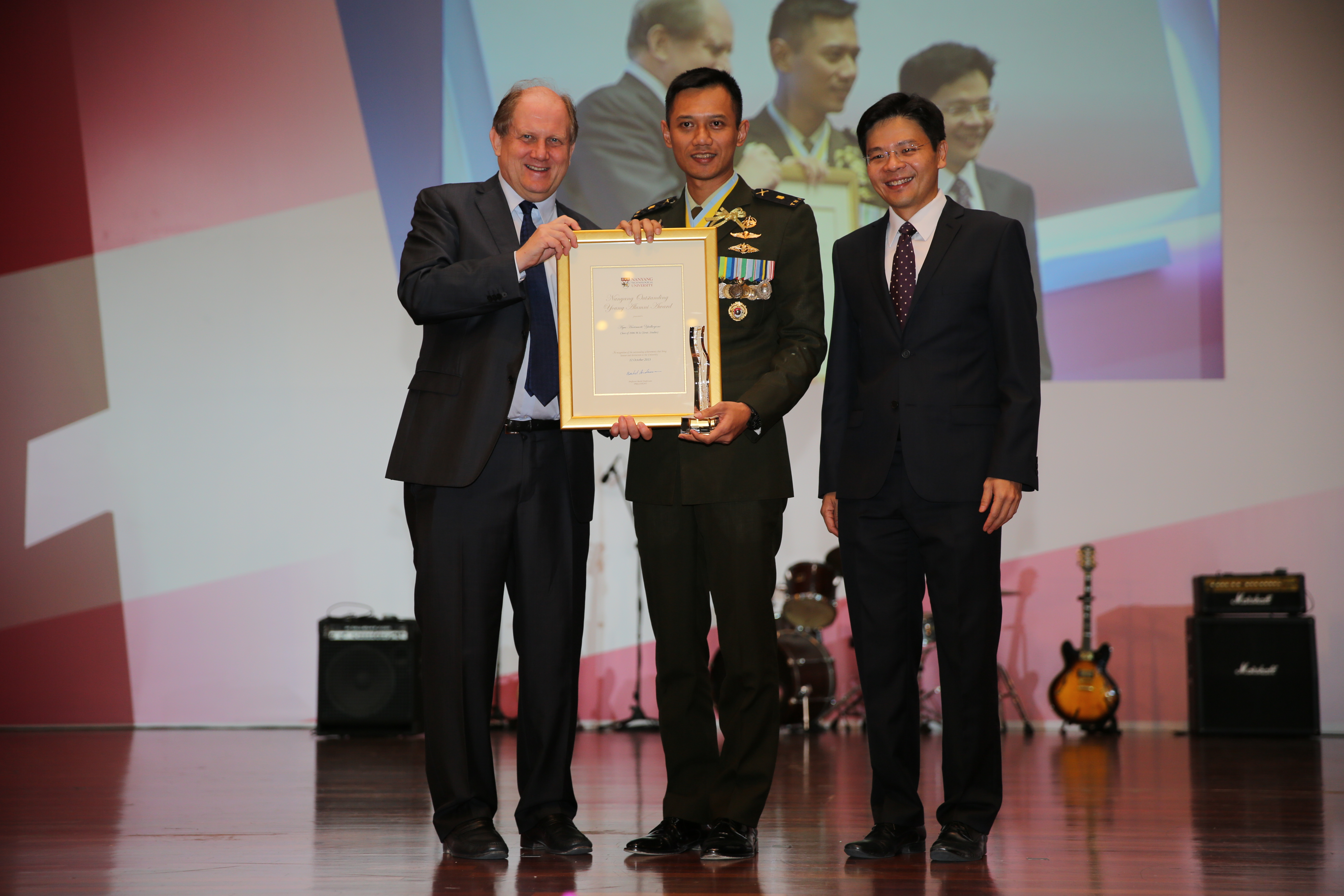

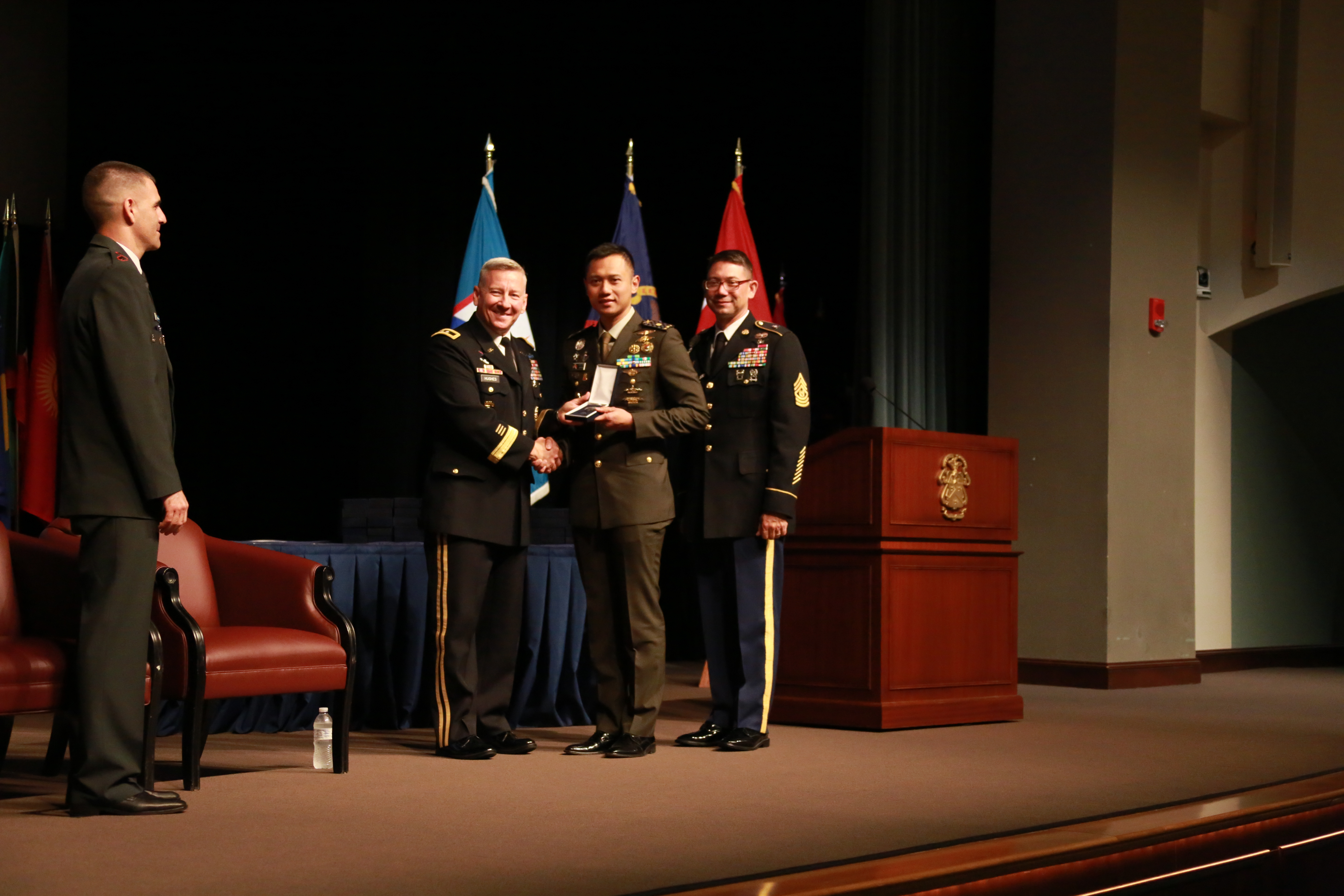

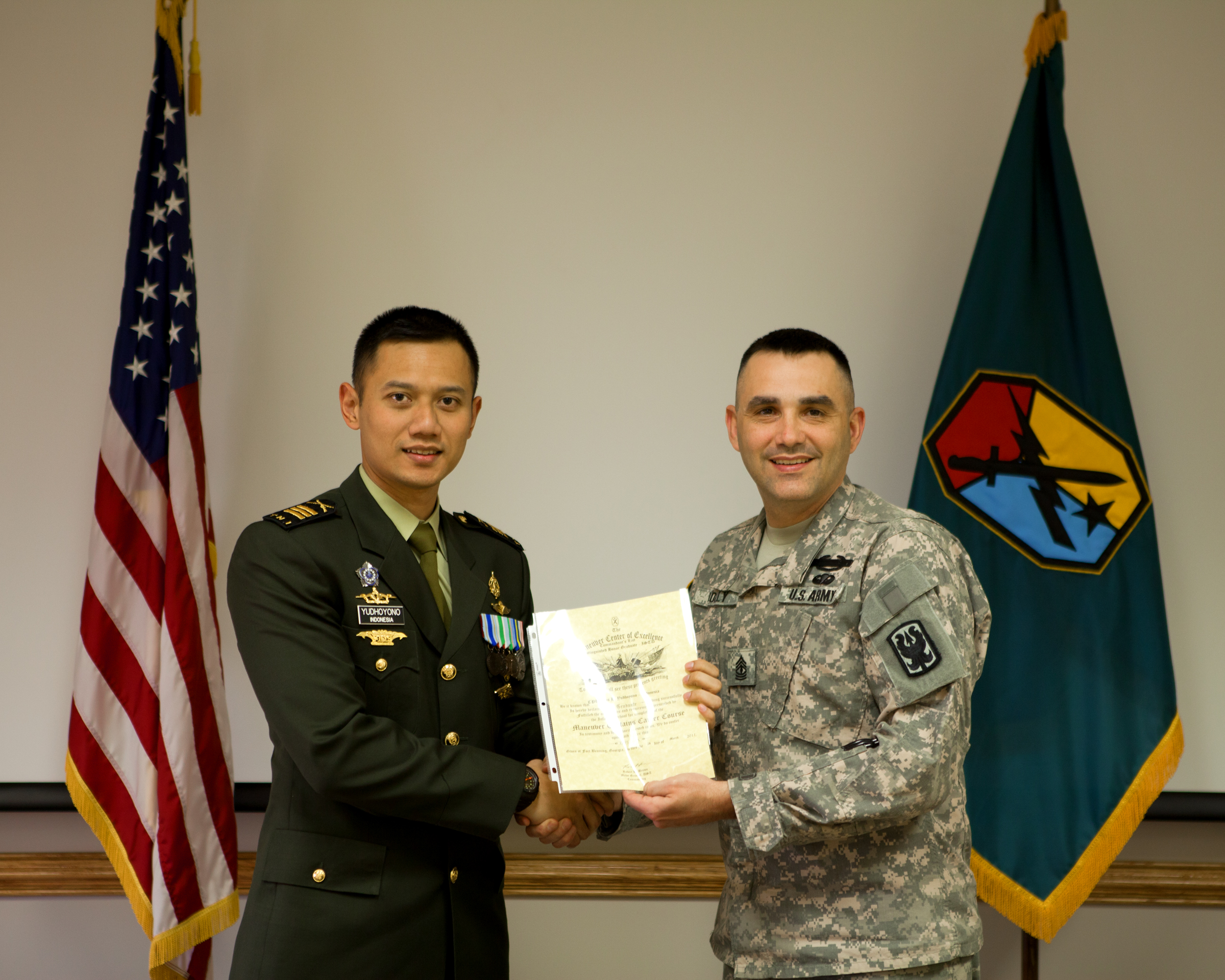

== Job history ==
- First Officer of the Infantry Armament Center (2000)
- First Officer of the Army's Strategic Branch Command (2001)
- First Officer Infantry Division 1 / Kostrad (2002)
- Platoon III / C Commander of the 305th Airborne Infantry Battalion / Tengkorak (2002)
- Platoon II / C Commander of 305th Airborne Infantry Battalion / Tengkorak (2003)
- Head of Section 2 / Operations of the 305th Airborne Infantry Battalion / Skull (2004)
- Company Commander Rifle C Airborne 305 Infantry Battalion C / Company Skull (2005)
- Head of Operations Section of the Garuda XXIII-A Mechanical Contingent Infantry Battalion (2006)
- First Officer of Indonesian National Army Headquarters (2008)
- Assistant Section Chief of the American Section of the Ministry of Defense of the Republic of Indonesia (2008)
- First Officer of the Directorate General of Strategic and Defense Ministry of Defense of the Republic of Indonesia (2009)
- Intermediate Officer Indonesian National Army Headquarters / Student Advanced Course Officer (United States) (2010)
- Head of Section 2 / Operation of the 17th Airborne Infantry Brigade / Kujang I Kostrad (2011)
- Middle Officer Indonesian National Army Headquarters (2013)
- Head of Domestic Cooperation Sub Division of Indonesian Defense University (2014)
- Detachment Middle Officer Army Headquarters (School Education Staff and Command LN) (2014)
- Commander of the 203rd Mechanical Infantry Battalion / Arya Kemuning (2015)
- The Yudhoyono Institute's Executive Director (2017)
- Commander of the Democratic Party Kogasma (2018)
- Deputy Chair of the Democratic Party (2019)

== Publications ==
- 2019 Simultaneous Elections 2019 and the Challenges of Our Democracy, Strategy Magazine V edition.
- 2019 Celebrating Democracy Without Polarization, Jawa Pos Daily.
- 2018 Energi Muda Nusantara, Strategy Magazine edition IV.
- 2018 Sacrifice and Nationality, Republika Daily
- 2018 Restores the Youth Oath Spirit, Republika Daily.
- 2017 Planting Hope from Grassroots, Strategy Magazine III edition.
- 2017 Realizing Indonesia Gold 2045, Strategy Magazine edition I.
- 2017 Reflections on Pancasila in the 21st Century, Harian Rakyat Merdeka National Daily.
- 2017 Islam Knitting Brotherhood, Republika National Daily.
- 2017 Test for Democracy and Our Nationality, Kompas National Daily.
- 2017 Jakarta for All, Sindo National Daily.
- 2017 Jakarta for the People, Expose, Mizan. 2016 TNI and 21st Century Defense Diplomacy, Patriot Magazine.
- 2015 In the Hands of the Young Generation, Indonesia Succeeds in 2045, Indonesia Future Society (IFS) Newsletter Vol. 01
- 2015 Optimizing the Role of Dansat in Enhancing the Professionalism of Soldiers, as well as Developing Effective Combat Doctrines in Order to Win Future Battles, Yudhagama Journal.
- 2014 4000 Peacekeepers: Choice or Inevitability ?, Jawa Pos Newspaper.
- 2013 'Freedom or Death' Is Not Enough : Common Interests vs Joint Enemies, National Journal Newspaper.
- 2013 Young Generation Welcomes Indonesia 2045, Koran Media Indonesia.
- 2013 The Future of Warfare: Challenges Show TNI Needs Adaptive Leaders, The Jakarta Globe.
- 2013 Future Challenges of the TNI, Kompas Newspaper.
- 2013 Indonesia & Korea: 40 Years of Friendship & Beyond, Young Future Leaders Forum – Seoul, South Korea.
- 2013 2045: Path to Nation's Golden Age, The Jakarta Globe. 2013 Responding to the Challenges of the 21st Century, Apple Commander of the Armed Forces Army.
- 2012 Preparing the Doctrine of Fighting in the Era of "Warm Peace", Jurnal Yudhagama, Vol. 32 No.4.
- 2012 Realizing New Security Challenges and Sharing Responsibility, The Jakarta Post.
- 2012 Looking at the Future of the TNI, Kompas Newspaper.
- 2011 The Indonesian Defense University: Transforming the Indonesian Military and Creating a Better Public Awareness on the Significance of the National Security and Defense Sectors, ASEAN Regional Forum – Heads of Defense / Universities / Colleges / Institutions Meeting / ARF-HDUCIM.
- 2010 Unlikely Routes: Stronger Militaries by Transforming Military Education, Harvard Law School National Security Journal.
- 2008 Winning The Hearts and Minds: Lessons Learned From The Indonesian Peacekeeping Mission in Lebanon, Ministry of Foreign Affairs.

Political offices
Preceded by Hamengkubuwana IX as Coordinating Minister for Development	Coordinating Minister for Infrastructure and Regional Development; 2024–present	Incumbent
Preceded by Hadi Tjahjanto	Minister of Agrarian Affairs and Spatial Planning; 2024	Succeeded by Nusron Wahid
Party political offices
Preceded by Susilo Bambang Yudhoyono	Chairman of the Democratic Party; 2020–present	Incumbent
