= Chris Foster =

Chris Foster may refer to:

- Chris Foster (soccer), American soccer player
- Chris Foster (folk singer) (born 1948), English folk singer and guitarist

== See also ==
- Christopher Foster (disambiguation)
