= Air Force Falcons =

Intercollegiate sports teams of the United States Air Force Academy

- University: United States Air Force Academy
- Nickname: Falcons
- NCAA: Division I (FBS)
- Conference: Mountain West (primary); Other conferences: List: AHA (men's ice hockey); ASUN (men's lacrosse); WAC (men's soccer, men's swimming & diving); MPSF (men's gymnastics, fencing); Big 12 (men's wrestling); WCC (men's water polo); Patriot Rifle Conference (rifle)
- Athletic director: Nancy Hixson (interim)
- Location: USAF Academy, Colorado
- Varsity teams: 30 (including 3 non-NCAA)
- Football stadium: Falcon Stadium
- Arena: Clune Arena
- Ice hockey arena: Cadet Ice Arena
- Baseball stadium: Erdle Field
- Other venues: Cadet Field House; Cadet East Gym
- Colors: Blue and silver
- Mascot: The Bird and Nova
- Fight song: "Falcon Fight Song" (unofficial: "The U.S. Air Force")
- Website: goairforcefalcons.com

Team NCAA championships
- 2

Individual and relay NCAA champions
- 48

The Air Force Falcons are the intercollegiate athletic teams that represent the United States Air Force Academy, located in El Paso County, Colorado north of Colorado Springs. The athletic department has 17 men's and 10 women's NCAA-sanctioned teams. The current athletic director is Nathan Pine. The majority of Falcon teams compete as members of the Mountain West Conference.

== Team name origin ==
The falcon mascot was selected by popular vote of the Academy's Class of 1959, the first class to graduate from the Academy. The team mascot is "Mach 1" name of the first falcon presented to the academy on October 5, 1955, however each performing falcon is given an individual name by its cadet falconer. The current mascot, a female white phase gyrfalcon named Nova, has been the official mascot since 2020.

== Sports sponsored ==
Air Force is a member of the Mountain West Conference

Men's sports	Women's sports
Basketball	Basketball
Boxing	Boxing
Cross country	Cross country
Fencing	Fencing
Gymnastics	Gymnastics
Soccer	Soccer
Swimming & diving	Swimming & diving
Tennis	Tennis
Track and field^{†}	Track and field^{†}
Lacrosse	Volleyball
Football	
Golf	
Baseball	
Ice hockey	
Water polo	
Wrestling	
Co-ed sports
Rifle
† – Track and field includes both indoor and outdoor.

As a primary member of the Mountain West Conference, the United States Air Force Academy sponsors teams in sixteen men's, ten women's, and one coed NCAA-sanctioned sports. As of the current 2024–25 school year, the fencing program competes as an independent, rifle program in the Patriot Rifle Conference, men's gymnastics in the Mountain Pacific Sports Federation, ice hockey in Atlantic Hockey America, men's lacrosse program in the Atlantic Sun Conference, men's soccer and swimming & diving programs in the Western Athletic Conference, water polo in the West Coast Conference, and wrestling in the Big 12 Conference. Boxing is a member of the National Collegiate Boxing Association as the NCAA does not recognize boxing.

=== Baseball ===
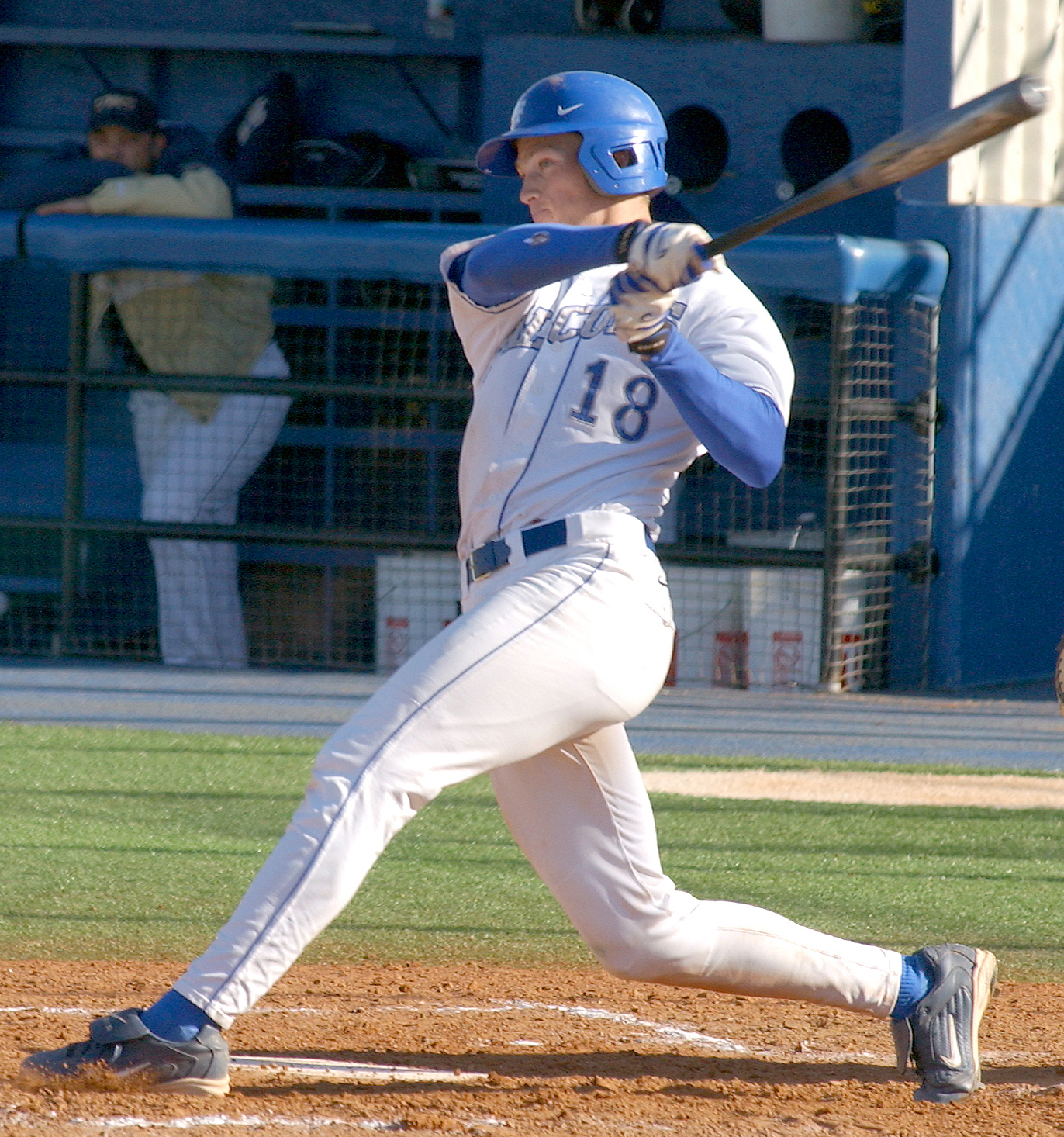
A Falcons baseball player takes a swing during a 2004 game

Air Force enjoyed some success on the baseball diamond in its early years and recently, earning seven berths to the NCAA Division I playoffs (1961, 1962, 1964, 1966, 1967, 1969 and 2022). The Falcons, however, never advanced beyond the district/regional rounds. They finished as runner-up in 2000, when they lost to San Diego State in the MW tournament championship game (which would have earned an automatic berth).

The baseball program plays home games at Erdle Field on campus.

=== Basketball ===
==== Men's basketball ====
The men's basketball team has had strong showings in the last several years, qualifying for the NCAA tournament and, most recently, making the final four of the 2007 National Invitational Tournament.

The best player in Air Force history according to ESPN is Bob Beckel, who scored 50 points in a game against Arizona in 1959 and scored over 45 points on 3 other occasions. The best coach in Air Force history is Bob Spear, who coached for 15 years (1956–1971), had a career record of 177–175, and led the Falcons to two NCAA Tournament Appearances. The Academy's most famous basketball alumnus, however, is Gregg Popovich, a Hall of Fame coach who has led the San Antonio Spurs to five NBA titles to date.

- NCAA Tournament appearances: 1960, 1962, 2004, 2006
- NIT Tournament appearances: 2007 (semifinals)
- Mountain West Conference champions: 2004 Regular Season

==== Women's basketball ====
The women's basketball team competed at the Division II level in both the AIAW and NCAA between 1976 and 1996. Since then, the team has competed at the Division I level.

- NCAA tournament appearances: 1985, 1990
- AIAW National Tournament appearances: 1979, 1980

=== Boxing ===
The Air Force men's boxing team has had success. Led for 31 years by Coach Ed Weichers, the team has won 18 National Collegiate Boxing Association championships, and until 2009, had never finished lower than second in the nation. In 2009, the team finished third in the nation.

The women's team debuted in national-level competition during the 2015 NCBA championships. The 2017 NCBA tournament featured the first individual national boxing title for the women's team.

On November 5, 2021, the men's and women's boxing teams took part in the first-ever boxing matches held at Globe Life Field, as a pre-gameday event before the Army-Air Force football game the following day; Air Force won the matchup 6 bouts to 4.

=== Ice hockey ===
From 2007 to 2009, the men's hockey team won three straight Atlantic Hockey conference tournaments, and made three straight appearances in the NCAA Division I hockey tournament. Their 2007 appearance in the NCAA tournament was the first ever by a service academy. In the East Regional of the 2009 NCAA tournament, Air Force upset top seed Michigan 2–0, and just missed going to the Frozen Four in a 3–2 double overtime loss to Vermont.

=== Lacrosse ===
Air Force has fielded an NCAA men's lacrosse team since 1967. They appeared in the Division I Championship tournament in 1971, 1977, 1988, 2014, 2016, and 2017. The team competed in the Southern Conference as an associate member through the 2021 season and joined the Atlantic Sun Conference (then officially the ASUN Conference), also as an associate member, on July 1, 2021.

=== Rifle ===
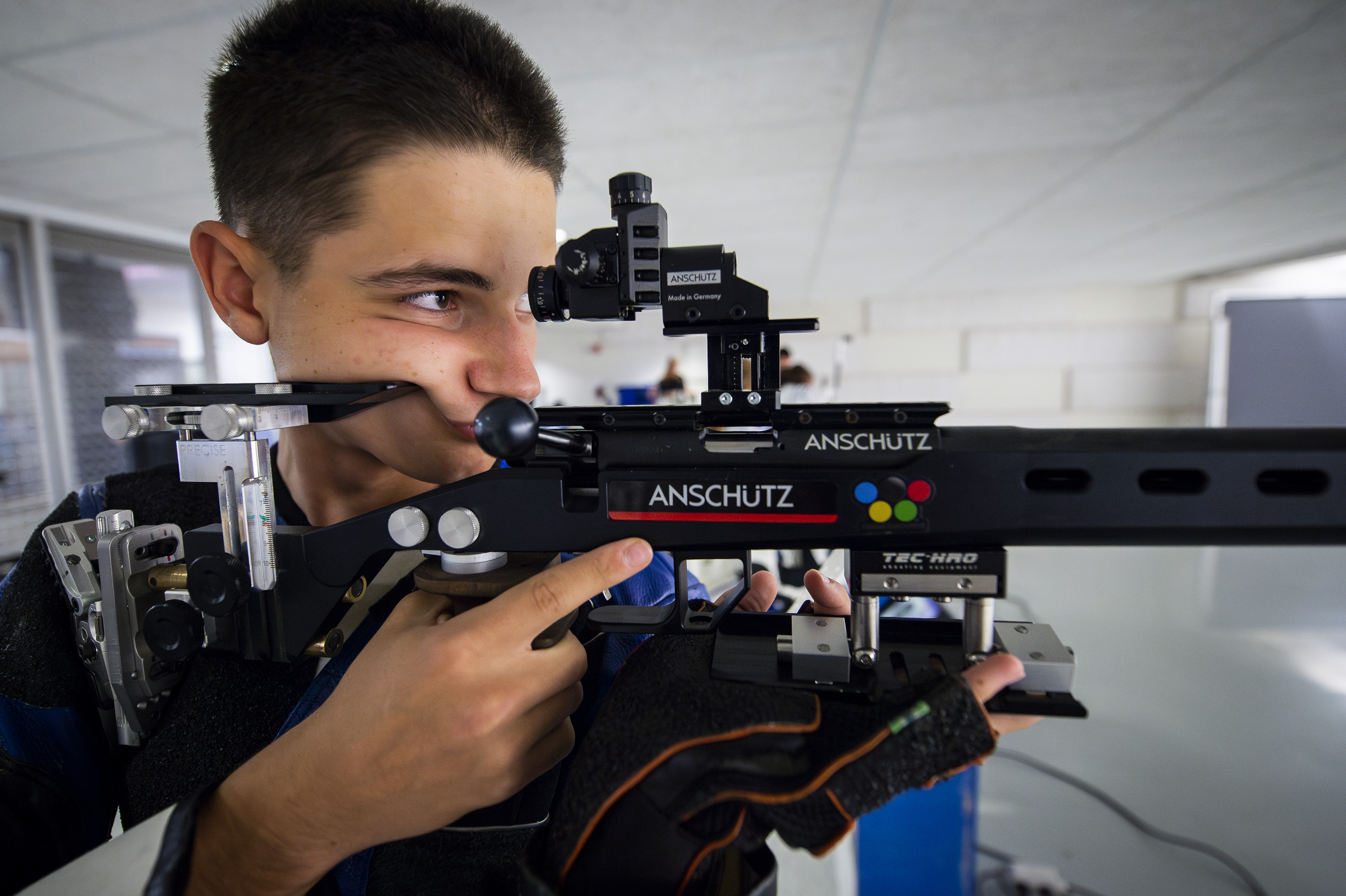
A member of the Falcons rifle team in 2023

In June, 2013, Air Force became a charter member of the Patriot Rifle Conference.

=== Tennis ===
The men's program was established in the 1950s, shortly after the Academy's founding in 1954, and has since competed at the NCAA Division I level, primarily as a member of the Mountain West Conference. The women's program was introduced in 1977.

=== Wrestling ===
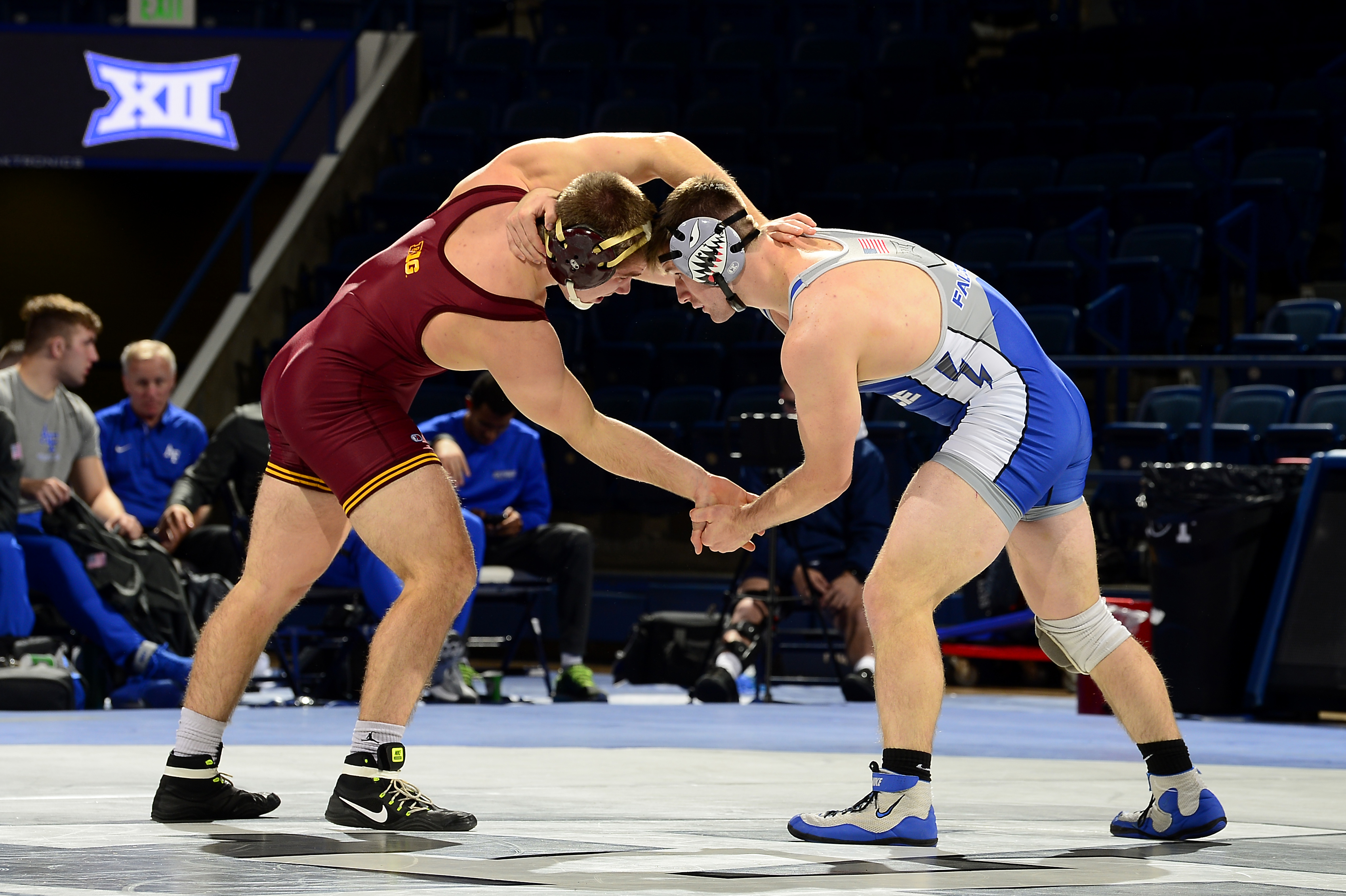
Air Force vs. Minnesota wrestling match in 2018

The Falcon wrestling team began competition in 1957 and currently competes in the Big 12 Conference (the Mountain West doesn't sponsor wrestling). In 1991 AF wrestling won the WAC championship, the first ever by any USAFA sports team. From 2006 to 2015, the Falcons had been a member of the Western Wrestling Conference (WWC), but the conference chose to disband after the 2014–15 school year when all of its members accepted an offer of single-sport membership in the Big 12. Home wrestling events are held at either the Cadet East Gym or at Clune Arena. The team's current head coach is Sam Barber, who first took on the position for the 2014–15 season having spent five years as assistant coach and recruiting coordinator. He is assisted by Joe Johnston, Chris Heilman, and Elroy Perkin; the latter of whom joined the Falcons staff ahead of the 2024–25 season from Big 12 Conference rival the California Baptist Lancers.

==== Team championships ====
Team championships
Year	Championship	Conference	Ref.
1991	Team Championship	WAC	
1999	All-Academy Wrestling Championship	—N/a	
2000	All-Academy Wrestling Championship	—N/a	
2001	All-Academy Wrestling Championship	—N/a	
2002	All-Academy Wrestling Championship	—N/a	
2015	All-Academy Wrestling Championship	—N/a	

==== Individual championships ====
Individual championships
Year	Athlete	Championship	Conference	Ref.
2005	Matt Benza	West Regional Championship	WWC	
2005	Brandon Strong	West Regional Championship	WWC	
2022	Wyatt Hendrickson	Mountaineer Invitational Title	—	
2022	Cody Phippen	Mountaineer Invitational Title	—	
2022	Sam Wolf	Mountaineer Invitational Title	—	
2025	Owen Heiser	Rocky Mountain Open Title	—	
2025	Soren Herzog	Rocky Mountain Open Title	—	

==== Individual honors ====
Individual honors
Year	Athlete	Honor	Body	Ref.
2002	Scott Frohardt	All-American	NCAA Division I Men's Wrestling Championships	
2002	Kevin Hoy	All-American	NCAA Division I Men's Wrestling Championships	
2002	Terry Parham	All-American	NCAA Division I Men's Wrestling Championships	
2019	Kayne Hutchison	All-American	UWW U.S. Open	
2019	Garrett O'Shea	Scholar All-American	National Wrestling Coaches Association (NWCA)	
2021	Cody Phippen	Scholar All-American	National Wrestling Coaches Association (NWCA)	
2021	Jared Van Vleet	Scholar All-American	National Wrestling Coaches Association (NWCA)	
2023	Wyatt Hendrickson	All-American	NCAA Division I Men's Wrestling Championships	
2025	Jack Ganos	Scholar All-American	National Wrestling Coaches Association (NWCA)	

=== Soccer ===
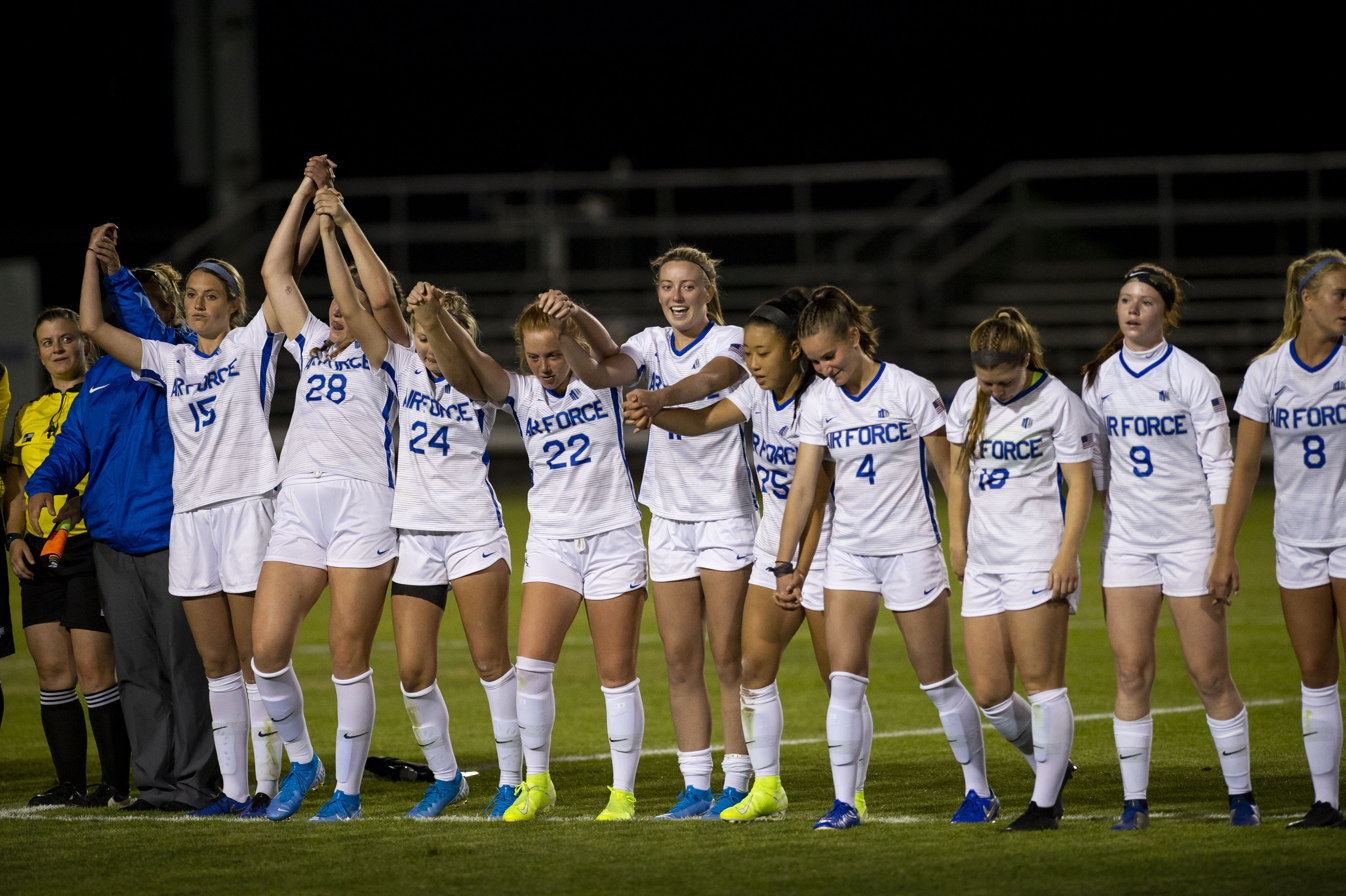
Falcons women's soccer players in 2019

The Air Force's soccer team has competed in NCAA Division I men's college soccer competitions since 1956, competing as members in the Western Athletic Conference. They are coached by Doug Hill and Assistant Coach Chris Foster, and their home matches are played at Cadet Soccer Stadium. Their best performances in the 14 NCAA Tournaments the team has qualified for have been reaching the quarterfinals in 1968 and 1993.

=== Notable club sports ===
==== Rugby ====
The Air Force rugby program was created in 1968 and began competing in college rugby in 1980. Air Force competes in the west division of the College Premier Division against rivals such as Colorado State and Wyoming. Air Force has been one of the most successful programs in college rugby. Air Force finished as one of the top 3 teams in the country 11 times from 1980 to 1995, including back-to-back national championships in 1989 and 1990. More recently, Air Force were national champions again in 2003 and third place in 2004. Several Air Force players have gone on to play for the US men's national rugby team. Air Force won the 2012 Rocky Mountain 7s tournament to qualify for the 2012 USA Rugby Sevens Collegiate National Championships. Air Force also played in the 2013 USA Rugby Sevens Collegiate National Championships, reaching the quarterfinals.

==== Team handball ====
The Air Force team handball program was created in 1976. It's one of the must successful men's team handball college program in the country with 3 national titles. At the beginning they had also a women's team. They won a national title in 1988. The Air Force men's team is one of few colleges which has won an adults national title this was in the year 1978. Their fiercest and longest college team handball rivalry is with Army.

== History ==
=== Athletic Directors ===
Here's a list of previous Athletic directors:

Name	Tenure
Col Robert V. Whitlow	1954–1957
Col George B. Simler	1957–1960
Col Maurice L. Martin	1960–1963
Col Edmund A. Rafalko	1963–1967
Col Francis E. Merritt	1967–1975
Col John Clune	1975–1991
Col Ken Schweitzer	1991–1996
Col Randall Randy Spetman	1996–2004
Dr. Hans Mueh	2004–2015
Jim Knowlton	2015–2018
Col Jennifer Block	2018–2019
Nathan Pine	2019–2026
Dr. Nancy Hixson (interim)	2026–present

== National championships ==
Air Force has won 10 NCAA Division I individual championships, 2 NCAA Division II team championships, and 38 NCAA Division II individual championships.

=== Team ===
Sport	Association	Division	Year	Opponent/Runner-up	Score
Women's swimming and diving (2)	NCAA	Division II	1995	Oakland	690–563 (+127)
Women's swimming and diving (2)	NCAA	Division II	1996	Oakland	697.5–625 (+72.5)

== Facilities ==
- Cadet Field House
- Cadet Ice Arena (cap. 2,217) – part of the Cadet Field House
- Clune Arena (cap. 5,508) – part of the Cadet Field House
- Eisenhower Golf Club
- Erdle Field (cap. 1,000)
- Falcon Stadium (cap. 33,441)
- Cadet Soccer Stadium
- Cadet Lacrosse Stadium

== See also ==
- Military World Games
