= Annisa Pohan =

American-born Indonesian actress, model, presenter and radio announcer

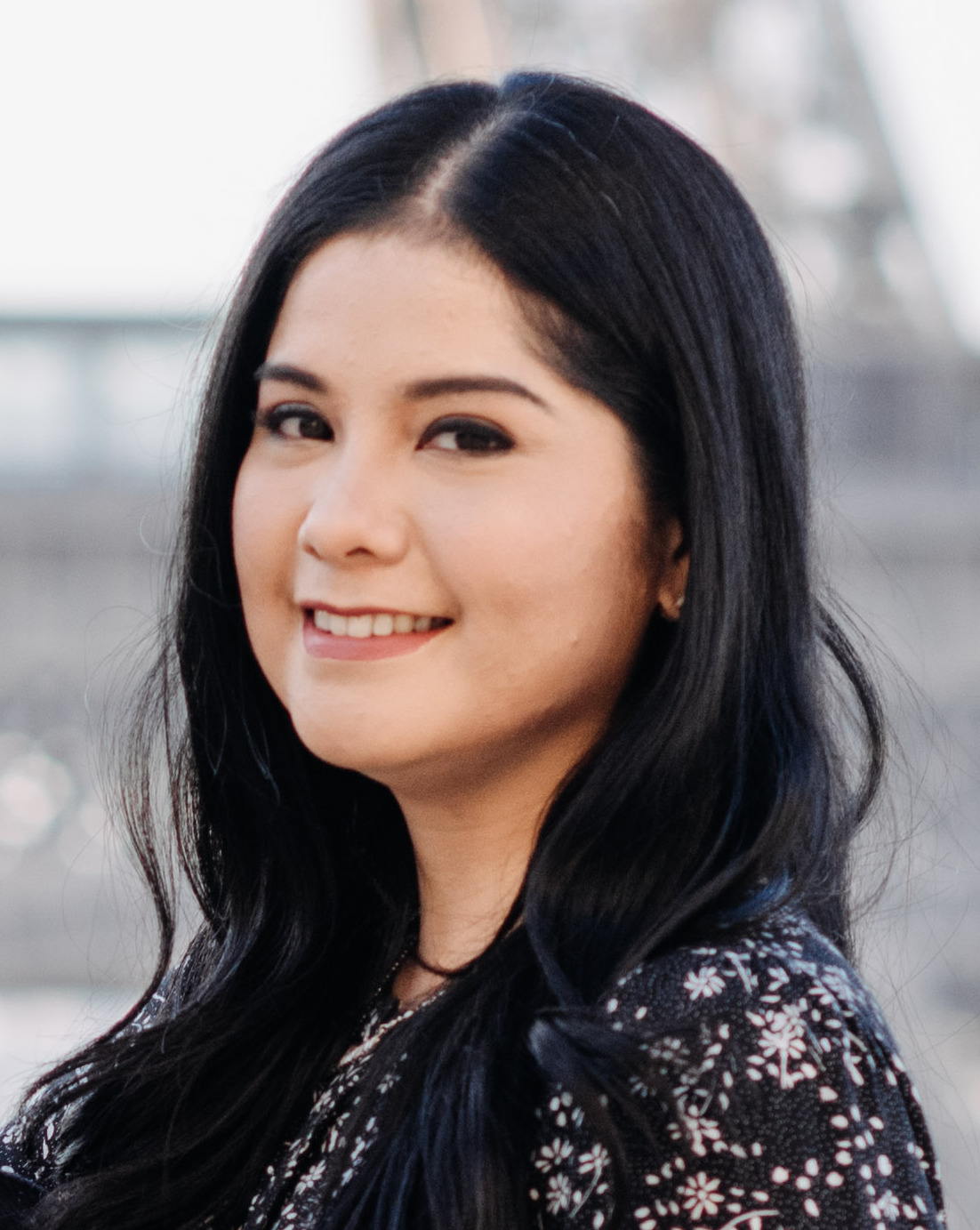
- Annisa Pohan, 2019
- Born: Annisa Larasati Pohan; 20 November 1981 (age 44); Boston, Massachusetts, U.S.
- Other name: Annisa Pohan
- Education: Padjadjaran University
- Occupations: Actress; model; presenter
- Spouse: Agus Harimurti Yudhoyono (m. 2005)
- Children: 2
- Parents: Aulia Pohan (father); Mulyaningsih (mother)
- Relatives: Susilo Bambang Yudhoyono (father-in-law); Ani Yudhoyono (mother-in-law); Edhie Baskoro Yudhoyono (brother-in-law)

Annisa Larasati Pohan (born 20 November 1981) is an American-born Indonesian actress, model, presenter, and former radio announcer.

== Early life ==
Pohan was born in Boston, Massachusetts. She is the second of three children and the only daughter of Aulia Pohan from North Sumatra and Mulyaningsih. Her father was a former Deputy Governor of the Bank of Indonesia. She followed her father to Tokyo for several years. She lived in Jakarta from elementary school to high school (SMA Negeri 70 Bulungan). She holds an economics degree from Padjadjaran University, Bandung, and a master's Management degree from the University of Indonesia.

== Career ==
In 1997, when she was fifteen years old, Pohan participated in a teenage model search called Gadis Sampul, coming second runner-up. She pursued an entertainment career and worked as a radio announcer at Oforz Radio. She also became the presenter of various TV programs such as Sport RCTI, Bundesliga, La Liga, Celebrity Jam, and Good Morning on the Weekend.

== Tunggadewi Foundation ==
Pohan is the founder of the Tunggadewi Foundation, which aids women and children. It was founded in 2009 by Pohan and her friends, including Rumah Pintar (Smart House) and Jendela Dunia (Window on the World). It offers informal learning centers free of charge to children and their mothers.

The name Tunggadewi was taken from a queen who reigned during the period of the Majapahit Kingdom and was known for how her wisdom and justice brought prosperity and well-being to her people. The name reflects their hope that the Foundation can bring well-being to the people by focusing on empowering women and enhancing education.

== Personal life ==
She married Agus Harimurti Yudhoyono, the first son of former President of Indonesia Susilo Bambang Yudhoyono and his wife, Kristiani Herrawati, in 2005. After their long period of relationship, they married on 8 July 2005.

On 17 August 2008, the first daughter of Pohan and Yudhoyono was born on the 63rd Indonesian Independence Day.

In 2009, Pohan followed her husband to the United States where he took Master of Public Administration at the John F. Kennedy School of Government at Harvard, Massachusetts, US, and Maneuver Captains Career Course at Fort Benning, Georgia. In 2011 Pohan and her family returned to Indonesia.
