= Christopher Foster =

Christopher Foster may refer to:

- Christopher Foster (cricketer) (1904–1971), English cricketer
- Christopher Foster (economist) (1930–2022), English academic
- Christopher Foster (bishop) (born 1953), Bishop of Portsmouth
- For the Shropshire, England arsonist and murderer, see Osbaston House deaths

== See also ==
- Chris Foster (disambiguation)
