= Eisenhower Golf Club =

Golf club in Colorado, US

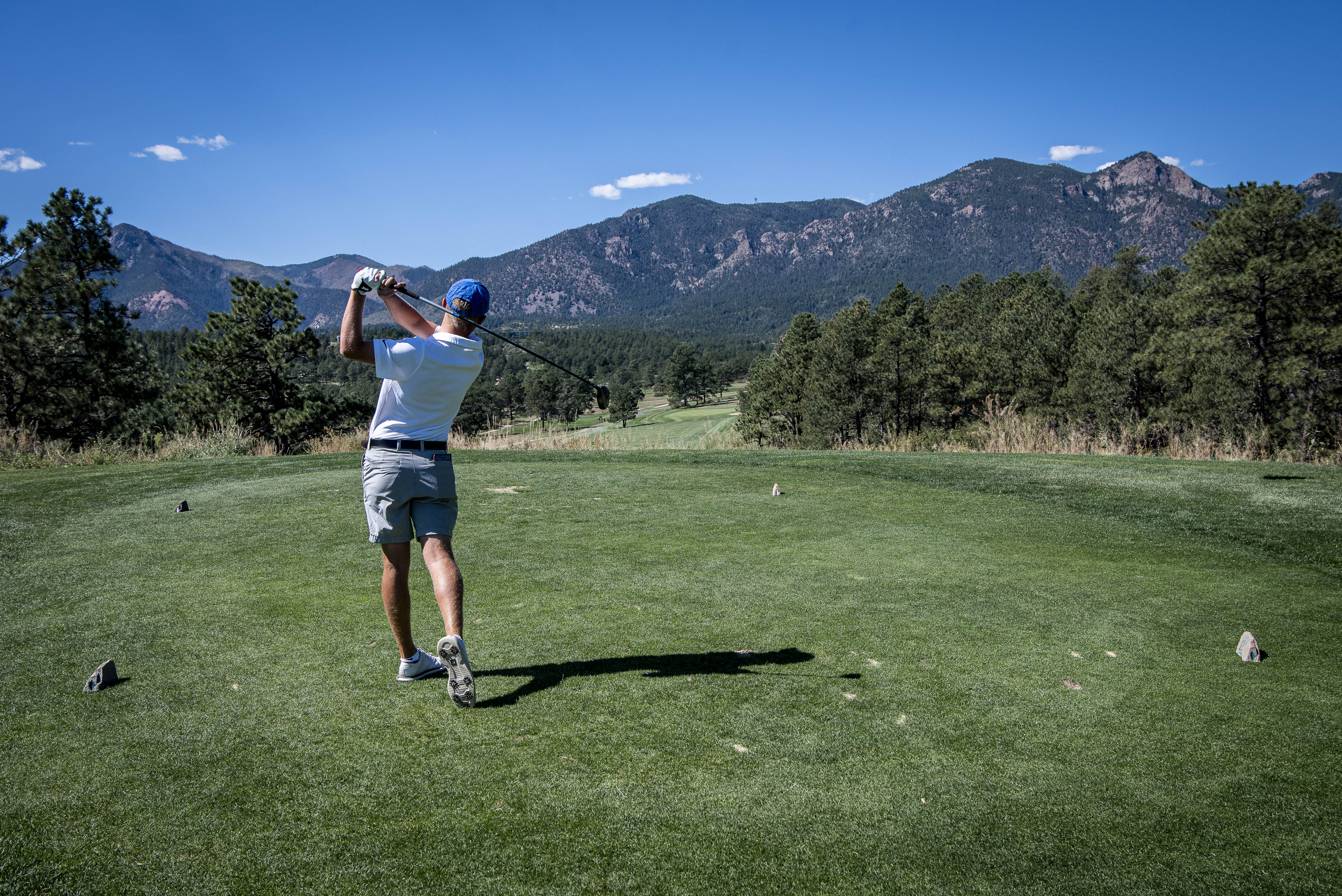
- An Air Force Falcons golfer teeing off at Eisenhower in 2023
- Interactive map of Eisenhower Golf Club
- 39.00600086595573°N 104.85881299983471°W

Club information
- Location: Colorado Springs, Colorado, U.S.
- Established: 1959; 67 years ago
- Type: Private
- Owner: United States Department of Defense
- Operator: United States Department of Defense
- Tota holes: 36

Blue
- Designed by: Robert Trent Jones
- Par: 72
- Length: 7,511 yards
- Course rating: 74.3
- Slope rating: 141

Silver
- Designed by: Frank Hummel
- Par: 72
- Length: 6,402 yards
- Course rating: 70.2
- Slope rating: 130

The Eisenhower Golf Club, named after U.S. President Dwight Eisenhower, is the golf club located on the grounds of the United States Air Force Academy, just north of Colorado Springs, Colorado. Being on a military installation, the course is generally only open to active duty, retired military, reservists, national guard, certain other government employees/contractors, and their guests.

President Eisenhower participated in a dedication ceremony at the club in 1963.
