= Hans Mueh =

American Air Force athletic director

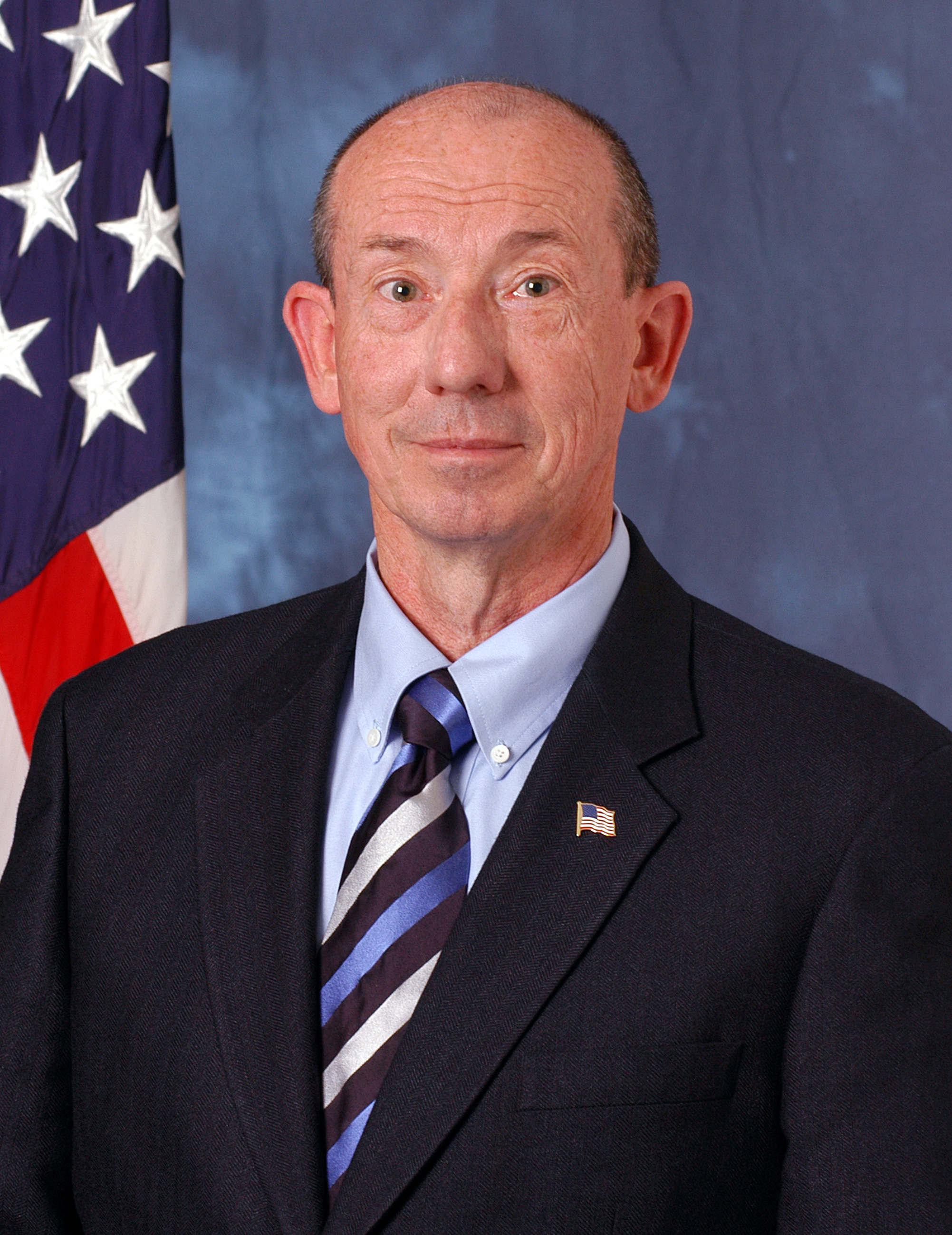

Biographical details
- Born: January 8, 1944 (age 82); Celle, Germany
- Education: United States Air Force Academy

Administrative career (AD unless noted)
- 2004–2015: Air Force

Hans Juergen Mueh (born January 8, 1944) was the director of athletics at the United States Air Force Academy, Colorado Springs, Colorado, serving in that position from 2004 until January 2015. Prior to becoming the director of athletics for the USAF, Dr. Mueh served as permanent professor and head of the Department of Chemistry, and Vice Dean of Faculty at the Academy.

== Background ==
Mueh was born in Celle, Germany and emigrated to the United States in 1951. He graduated from the U.S. Air Force Academy in 1966. He served as an intelligence officer in Saigon, South Vietnam, and at Nakhon Phanom Royal Thai Air Force Base, Thailand. In 1976, he was recognized as a distinguished graduate after completing a Doctor of Philosophy in chemistry at the University of Wisconsin, and in 1977 he was assigned to the U.S. Air Force Academy as an associate professor in chemistry. Dr. Mueh then served as special assistant for technical matters at the Defense Intelligence Agency before returning to the Air Force Academy where he served as head of the Department of Chemistry and Vice Dean of the Faculty. He retired from the Air Force in 2004 and became the ninth director of athletics at the academy.

== Education ==
- 1966 Bachelor of Science, chemistry, U.S. Air Force Academy, Colorado Springs, Colo.
- 1970 Master of Science, chemistry, University of Wisconsin, Madison
- 1976 Doctor of Philosophy, chemistry, University of Wisconsin, Madison (distinguished graduate)

== Career chronology ==
- 1966–1967, intelligence officer trainee, Air Force Air Intelligence Training Center, Colorado Springs, Colo.
- 1967–1969, intelligence analyst, Headquarters Tactical Air Command, Langley AFB, Va.
- 1969–1970, graduate student, University of Wisconsin, Madison
- 1970–1972, instructor, Department of Chemistry, U.S. Air Force Academy, Colorado Springs, Colo.
- 1972–1973, intelligence officer, Saigon, South Vietnam, and Nakhon Phanom Royal Thai Air Force Base, Thailand
- 1973–1976, doctoral student, University of Wisconsin, Madison
- 1977–1981, associate professor, Department of Chemistry, U.S. Air Force Academy, Colorado Springs, Colo.
- 1981–1985, tenure associate professor, later, tenure professor, Department of Chemistry, U.S. Air Force Academy, Colorado Springs, Colo.
- 1985–1986, special assistant for technical matters, Defense Intelligence Agency, the Pentagon, Washington, D.C.
- 1986–2002, acting head, later, permanent professor and Head, Department of Chemistry, U.S. Air Force Academy, Colorado Springs, Colo.
- 2002–2004, vice dean of faculty, U.S. Air Force Academy, Colorado Springs, Colo.
- 2004–2015, athletic director, U.S. Air Force Academy, Colorado Springs, Colo.

== Awards and decorations ==
- Legion of Merit
- Defense Meritorious Service Medal
- Meritorious Service Medal with oak leaf cluster
- Joint Service Commendation Medal
- Air Force Commendation Medal with oak leaf cluster
- Army Achievement Medal

== Other achievements ==
- 1987–1989, officer representative, U.S. Air Force Academy men's intercollegiate golf team
- 1990–1995, officer representative, U.S. Air Force Academy football team
- 1996–present, NCAA Faculty Athletics Representative
