= Chris Foster (soccer) =

Personal information
- Full name: Christopher R. Foster
- Place of birth: United States
- Position: Forward

Youth career
- 1985–1988: Air Force Academy

Senior career*
Years	Team	Apps	(Gls)
1990	Colorado Foxes		
1992	New Mexico Chiles		

Managerial career
- 1989–1990: Air Force Academy (assistant)
- 2007–: Air Force Academy (assistant)
- * Club domestic league appearances and goals

Chris Foster is a retired U.S. soccer forward and current fighter pilot and soccer coach. Foster played one season in the American Professional Soccer League and one in the USISL. He is currently an assistant coach with the Air Force Falcons soccer team.

Foster attended the United States Air Force Academy where he played on the men's soccer team from 1985 to 1988. He finished his career with fifty-four goals, second on the school's all time goals list. At graduation, he was awarded the prestigious Air Force Academy's "Most Valuable Athlete" award. He was a third team All American his senior season. Following his graduation in 1989 with a bachelor's degree in engineering mechanics, he spent two seasons as an assistant coach on the school's soccer team. In 1989, he was a member of the U.S. soccer team at the World University Games. In 1990, he signed with the expansion Colorado Foxes in the American Professional Soccer League. In the fall of 1990, he moved to Williams AFB to attend pilot training followed by further training at Holloman AFB. While there, he played for the New Mexico Chiles in the USISL. Following his graduation from Air Force flight training, he embarked on a career as an F-15 pilot. In 2007, he returned as an instructor pilot and assistant men's soccer coach at the academy.
