= Ministry of Agrarian Affairs and Spatial Planning =

Government ministry of Indonesia

Ministry of Agrarian Affairs and Spatial Planning/National Land Agency
- Kementerian Agraria dan Tata Ruang/Badan Pertanahan Nasional
- Logo of the Ministry of Agrarian Affairs and Spatial Planning

- Flag of the Ministry of Agrarian Affairs and Spatial Planning

Ministry overview
- Formed: 27 October 2014
- Preceding agencies: National Land Agency; Directorate General of Spatial Planning, Ministry of Public Works
- Jurisdiction: Government of Indonesia
- Headquarters: Jalan Sisingamangaraja No. 2 Kebayoran Baru, Jakarta Selatan; 6.238065066768966°S 106.79890076922113°E
- Minister responsible: Nusron Wahid, Ministry of Agrarian Affairs and Spatial Planning
- Deputy Minister responsible: Ossy Dermawan, Deputy Ministry of Agrarian Affairs and Spatial Planning
- Child agencies: National Land Agency Regional Office (33 Offices); Land Agency Office (480 Offices)
- Website: www.atrbpn.go.id

The Ministry of Agrarian Affairs and Spatial Planning is a ministry that organizes government affairs in the field of land and spatial planning which is the scope of government affairs in the field of public works. The National Land Agency is a Non-Ministerial Government Institution that carries out government duties in the field of land.

This ministry is led by a Minister of Agrarian Affairs and Spatial Planning who also serves as the Head of the National Land Agency. Since October 21, 2024, the position of Minister of Agrarian Affairs and Spatial Planning/Head of the National Land Agency has been held by Nusron Wahid

== History ==
The Ministry of Agrarian Affairs and Spatial Planning of the Republic of Indonesia was first established in 1955 through Presidential Decree Number 55 of 1955. Before becoming a ministry in 1955, agrarian affairs were managed by the Ministry of Home Affairs.

== Organization ==
The organizational structure of the Ministry consists of:

- Office of the Ministry of Agrarian Affairs and Spatial Planning/National Land Agency
- Office of the Deputy Ministry of Agrarian Affairs and Spatial Planning/National Land Agency
- Secretariat General
- Directorate General of Spatial Planning
- Directorate General of Survey and Mapping of Land and Space
- Directorate General of Determination of Land Rights and Registration
- Directorate General of Agrarian Planning
- Directorate General of Land Acquisition and Land Development
- Directorate General of Land and Space Control and Order
- Directorate General of Handling of Land Disputes and Conflicts
- Human Resources Development Agency
- Inspectorate General
- Board of Experts
  - Senior Expert to the Minister for Agrarian Law and Indigenous Communities
  - Senior Expert to the Minister for Bureaucratic Reform
  - Senior Expert to the Minister for Community Participation and Regional Government
  - Senior Expert to the Minister for Area Development
  - Senior Expert to the Minister for Information Technology

The organizational structure of BPN consists of:

- Head held by the Minister of Agrarian Affairs and Spatial Planning;
- Deputy head held by the Deputy Minister of Agrarian Affairs and Spatial Planning; and
- The structure of the technical echelon I organizational unit uses the echelon I organizational structure at the Ministry of Agrarian Affairs and Spatial Planning whose duties and functions are in accordance.

=== Regional Offices and Land Offices ===
- To carry out the duties and functions of BPN in the regions, BPN Regional Offices are formed in the provinces and Land Offices in the districts/cities.
- More than 1 (one) Land Office can be formed in each district/city.
- The duties, functions, organizational structure, and work procedures of the BPN Regional Offices and Land Offices are determined by the Head after obtaining approval from the minister who organizes government affairs in the field of state apparatus.
