= Maneuver Captains Career Course =

Maneuver Captain's Career Course
- Active: 2005-Present
- Country: United States
- Type: Military Training Course
- Role: Company-grade Officer Training
- Size: 480 student officers
- Part of: United States Army Training and Doctrine Command
- Garrison/HQ: Fort Benning, Georgia
- Website: https://www.benning.army.mil/mcoe/dot/mc3

Commanders
- Director of Training: LTC Daniel Hurlbut
- Chief of Tactics: LTC Louis Zeisman

The Maneuver Captain's Career Course (MCCC or MC3) is a military training and education course primarily for U.S. Army infantry and armor officers. Organized under the Maneuver Center of Excellence (MCoE) at Fort Benning, Georgia, the course is 22 weeks long. While the course's students consist mostly of U.S. Army maneuver-branch captains and senior first lieutenants, several U.S. Marine Corps captains and officers from allied nations also attend. MCCC's mission is to prepare students for the leadership, training, and administrative requirements of a successful company commander and for the execution of the tactical planning responsibilities of Battalion S3s.

== History ==
MCCC's origins are in the Infantry Officer Advanced Course and Armor Officer Advanced Course. These two courses, under the U.S. Army Infantry School and the U.S. Army Armor School, both at Fort Benning, served a similar purpose in preparing captains in those branches for company command and service on a battalion staff. With the U.S. Congress' mandated Base Realignment and Closure (BRAC) reorganization of the Department of Defense in 2005, the infantry and armor schools were directed to partially merge. The branches collaborated and, by 2008, taught the same 'maneuver' curriculum to captains at both of their courses. The armor school completed its move to Fort Benning to form the Maneuver Center of Excellence in 2011 and the Maneuver Captain's Career Course replaced both legacy captains' courses.

== Organization ==
Three 'teams' fall under the course's Directorate of Training whose officer-in-charge is a lieutenant colonel. Each team, run by a senior major, consists of 12 seminars (or small groups), with a senior captain or major instructing about 15 student officers. The course is offered six times per year, with each team conducting two iterations. With small gaps, three classes, each of about 160 students, run concurrently. At any one time, the student population is usually 400 to 600 officers. The headquarters company of the 199th Infantry Brigade coordinates a small administrative section for the course.

== Course Content ==
=== Company Phase ===
The company phase is the first of two phases in the program of instruction. Topics covered include doctrinal preparation, where all students are grounded in the latest U.S. Army doctrine. Key references include field manuals covering operational terms and graphics; brigade combat team organization; tactics; offensive, defensive, and stability operations; and maneuver companies and battalions. In the small group setting, students prepare and brief five company-level operations orders, with scenarios drawn from infantry, Stryker, and heavy brigade combat teams. The last brief, known as Battle Forge, is the culmination of the company operations order training; a passing grade is required to move on to the next phase of the course. After Battle Forge, small groups conclude the company phase with education on training management. Additional instruction, usually in a large lecture setting with all small groups combined, is provided by experts in field artillery, aviation, combat engineering, military intelligence, and military law. A concurrent writing and communications program attempts to improve student writing ability and assigns a research paper and other military-oriented writing. Students are required to participate in the "Ultimate Football League" (UFL) in an effort to build camaraderie among students and instructors. Competition can be fierce and the UFL accounts for approximately 25% of injuries during MCCC.

=== Battalion Phase ===
The battalion phase focuses instruction on preparing students to serve on a battalion or brigade staff. Assigned practical exercises and operations orders, students collaborate as a member of a scenario-based staff, rotating through different positions (S-1, S-2, S-3, etc.) during this phase. Four scenarios highlight different types of army battalions operating in varying situations (e.g. full-scale war or low-intensity stability operations). Planning through the military decision-making process underpins this phase. At the end of the phase, each student selects an elective course to attend, lasting about 10 days. Choices include battalion-level training management and logistics.

== International students ==
MCCC hosts about 15 foreign officers every class. The goal of this program is to encourage foreign and U.S. officers to learn from one another, building mutual respect, trust, and understanding among allied armies. International officers are required to score a minimum of 75 on the English Comprehension Level test to be eligible to attend the course. English is usually a second or third language, so the course can be challenging from a linguistic perspective. To mitigate the language, cultural, and doctrinal difficulties these officers face, the MCoE offers a mandatory 20-day preparatory course for foreign students about to attend MCCC. This MANEUVER CCC IMSO Preparatory Course (B171699 MANEUVER CCC IMSO PC) provides instruction on military English language and selected U.S. Army doctrine, terminology, and acronyms.

== See also ==
- Fort Benning
- U.S. Army Captain
