= 2025 in Indonesia =

- Centuries: 20th; 21st
- Decades: 2000s; 2010s; 2020s
- See also: History of Indonesia; Timeline of Indonesian history; List of years in Indonesia

The following lists events that happened during 2025 in Indonesia.

== Incumbents ==
=== Central government ===
- President: Prabowo Subianto (Gerindra)
- Vice President: Gibran Rakabuming Raka (independent)
- Speaker of the MPR: Ahmad Muzani (Gerindra)
- Speaker of the DPR: Puan Maharani (PDI-P)
- Speaker of the DPD: Sultan Bachtiar Najamudin (Bengkulu)

Prabowo
Subianto

Gibran
Rakabuming

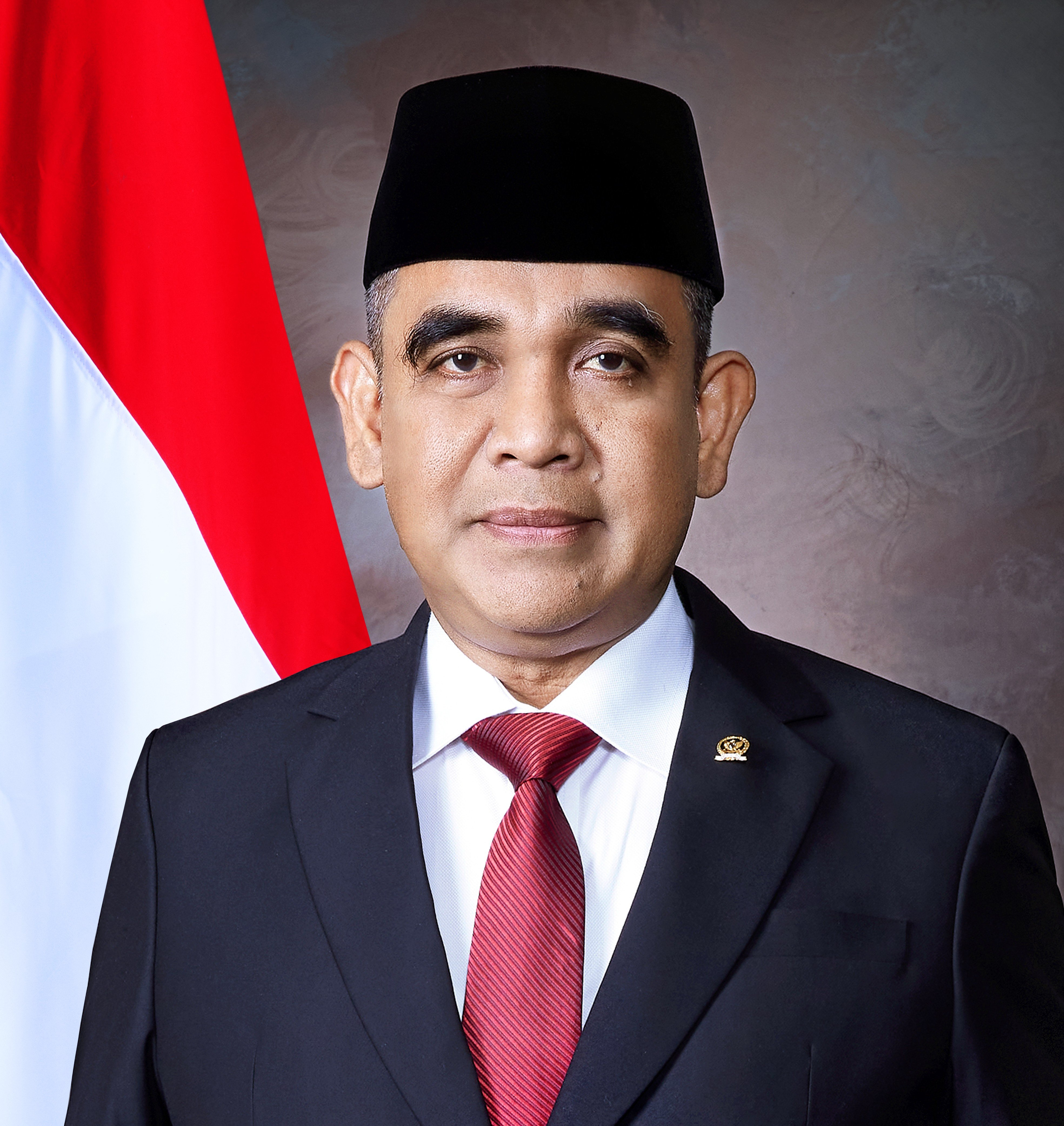
Ahmad
Muzani

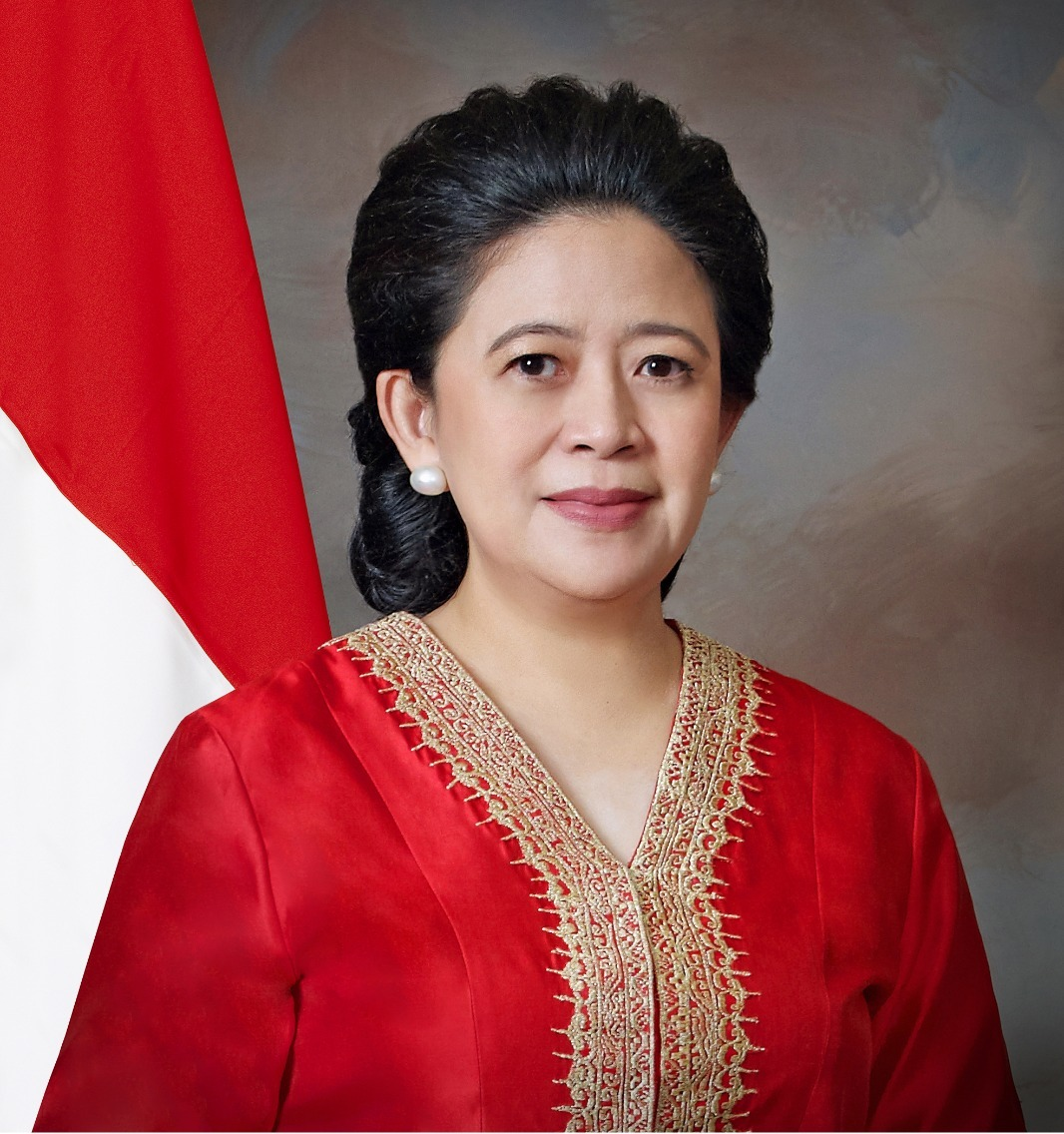
Puan
Maharani

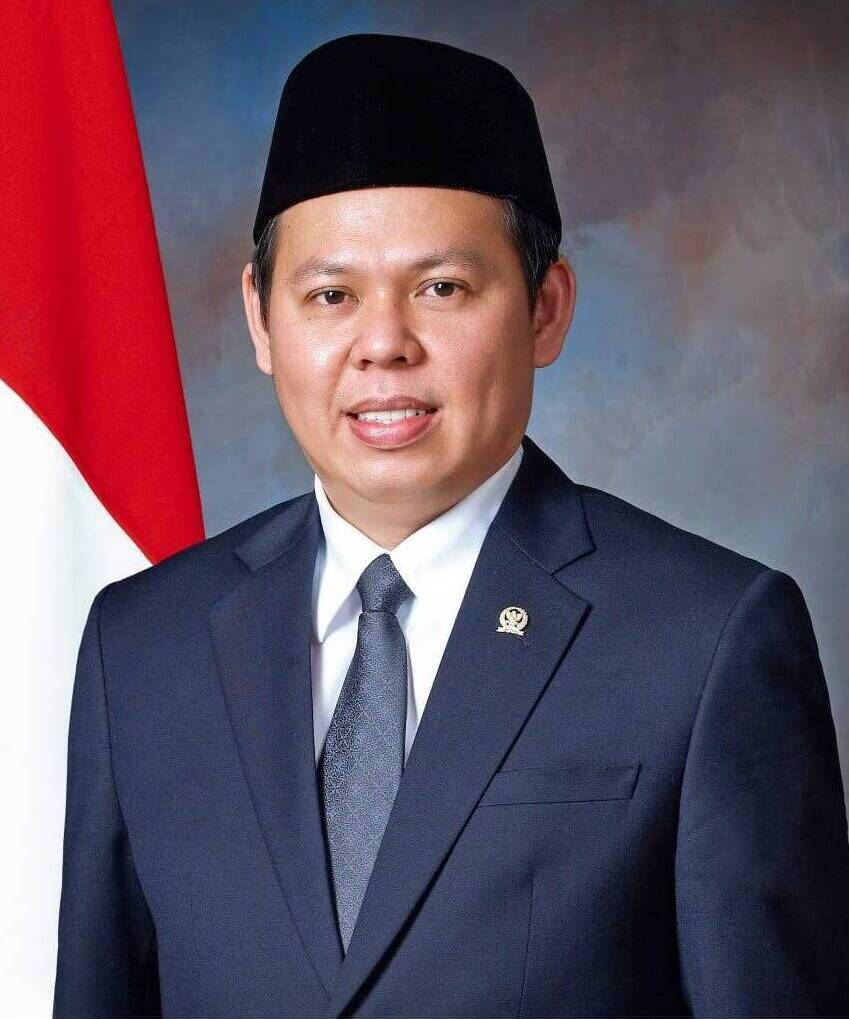
Sultan
Najamudin

Governors

=== Governors ===
- Aceh: Muzakir Manaf (Aceh) (starting 7 February)
- North Sumatra: Bobby Nasution (Gerindra) (starting 7 February)
- West Sumatra: Mahyeldi Ansharullah (PKS)
- Riau: Abdul Wahid (PKB) (starting 7 February)
- Riau Islands: Ansar Ahmad (Golkar)
- Jambi: Al Haris (PAN)
- South Sumatra: Herman Deru (NasDem) (starting 7 February)
- Bengkulu: Helmi Hasan (PAN) (starting 7 February)
- Bangka Belitung Islands: Hidayat Arsani (Golkar) (starting 7 February)
- Lampung: Rahmat Mirzani Djausai (Gerindra) (starting 7 February)
- Banten: Andra Soni (Gerindra) (starting 7 February)
- Jakarta: Pramono Anung (PDI-P) (starting 7 February)
- West Java: Dedi Mulyadi (Gerindra) (starting 7 February)
- Central Java: Ahmad Luthfi (Gerindra) (starting 7 February)
- Yogyakarta: Hamengkubuwana X (independent)
- East Java: Khofifah Indar Parawansa (PKB) (starting 7 February)
- Bali: I Wayan Koster (PDI-P) (starting 7 February)
- West Nusa Tenggara: Lalu Muhammad Iqbal (independent) (starting 7 February)
- East Nusa Tenggara: Emanuel Melkiades Laka Lena (Golkar) (starting 7 February)
- West Kalimantan: Ria Norsan (PDI-P) (starting 7 February)
- Central Kalimantan:
  - Sugianto Sabran (PDI-P) (until 7 February)
  - Agustiar Sabran (Gerindra) (starting 7 February)
- South Kalimantan: Muhidin (PAN)
- East Kalimantan: Rudy Mas'ud (Golkar) (starting 7 February)
- North Kalimantan: Zainal Arifin Paliwang (Gerindra)
- West Sulawesi: Suhardi Duka (Demokrat) (starting 7 February)
- South Sulawesi: Andi Sudirman Sulaiman (Gerindra) (starting 7 February)
- Southeast Sulawesi: Andi Sumangerukka (PPP) (starting 7 February)
- Central Sulawesi:
  - Rusdy Mastura (Gerindra) (until 7 February)
  - Anwar Hafid (Demokrat) (starting 7 February)
- Gorontalo: Gusnar Ismail (Demokrat) (starting 7 February)
- North Sulawesi:
  - Olly Dondokambey (PDI-P) (until 7 February)
  - Yulius Selvanus (Gerindra) (starting 7 February)
- Maluku: Hendrik Lewerissa (Gerindra) (starting 7 February)
- North Maluku: Sherly Tjoanda (Demokrat) (starting 7 February)
- Southwest Papua: Elisa Kambu (independent) (starting 7 February)
- West Papua: Dominggus Mandacan (NasDem) (starting 7 February)
- Central Papua: Meki Fritz Nawipa (PDI-P) (starting 7 February)
- South Papua: Apolo Safanpo (independent) (starting 7 February)
- Highland Papua: John Tabo (Golkar) (starting 7 February)
- Papua: Mathius Fakhiri (Golkar) (starting 8 October)

== Events ==
=== January ===
- 1 January – An increase in the value-added tax (VAT) rate to 12% is put into effect on luxury goods and services or those that fall into the luxury tax category.
- 6 January
  - Indonesia is fully admitted as a member state of the BRICS group.
  - The Free Nutritious Meals (MBG) program of the Prabowo administration is officially started.
  - Shin Tae-yong is dismissed as coach of the Indonesia national football team amid multiple issues involving the team.
- 8 January
  - At least four people die and eleven others are injured after a bus carrying a group of students from Bali crashes into several vehicles in Batu, East Java.
  - The Football Association of Indonesia appoints Patrick Kluivert as coach of the Indonesia national football team, replacing Shin Tae-yong.
- 15 January –
  - A fire engulfs the Glodok Plaza shopping center in Glodok, West Jakarta, killing eight people and leaving several missing.
  - The government raises its highest volcanic eruption level over Mount Ibu in Halmahera following a major eruption.
- 20 January – Landslides caused by heavy rains in Denpasar and Klungkung, Bali kill at least nine people.
- 21 January
  - Flooding and landslides in Pekalongan, Central Java kill at least 25 people.
  - A fire hits a residential area on Jalan Kemayoran Gempol, Kemayoran, Central Jakarta, destroying more than 500 houses and displacing 1,797 residents.
- 24 January
  - Indonesia and France sign an agreement to repatriate French national Serge Atlaoui, who has been in death row since 2007 in an Indonesian prison following a conviction for drug smuggling.
  - The village head of Kohod in Tangerang Regency, Arsin bin Sanip, disappears after being involved in an argument with the Minister of Agrarian Affairs and Spatial Planning, Nusron Wahid, about the sea fence on the north coast of Tangerang. He is suspected of being involved in corruption and bribery cases.
  - The Malaysian Maritime Enforcement Agency opens fire on a boat carrying Indonesian migrant workers off the coast of Tanjung Rhu Beach, Selangor State, killing one passenger and injuring four others.
- 27 January – Four people are killed by a landslide in Mamuju Regency, West Sulawesi.
- 30 January – Composer Ari Bias wins a copyright infringement lawsuit against Agnez Mo for performing the song Bilang Saja without permission in three concerts in May 2023, with the Central Jakarta Commercial Court ordering her to pay 1.5 billion rupiah in damages.

=== February ===
- 1 February – The Minister of Energy and Mineral Resources sets a policy on the sale of 3 kg gas cylinders and can no longer be done at the retail level, prompting customers of 3 Kg LPG to go to the bases located in various regions that have been registered.
- 4 February – A truck crashes into a queue of cars at a toll booth in Ciawi, West Java, killing eight people and injuring 11 others.
- 5 February – Serge Atlaoui is repatriated to France as part of the bilateral agreement signed on 24 January.
- 12 February – A court in Banten sentences six members of a poaching gang to up to 12 years' imprisonment for the killing of 26 Javan rhinoceroses in Ujung Kulon National Park from 2018 to 2023.
- 13 February – The dismantling of the 30.16 km (18.74 mi) sea fence in Tangerang is completed after 11 days.
- 16 February – Indonesia wins its first gold medal at the Badminton Asia Mixed Team Championships after Muhammad Shohibul Fikri and Daniel Marthin defeat China's Chen Xujun and Huang Di 21-15, 21-9 in the men's doubles at the 2025 edition held in Qingdao, China.
- 17 February –
  - Student-led protests against the government start throughout several cities in Indonesia, calling for a "Dark Indonesia" movement.
  - A group of singers and songwriters, including prominent figures like Armand Maulana, Ariel NOAH, and Bunga Citra Lestari, form the collective Vibrasi Suara Indonesia (VISI) and file a judicial review with the Constitutional Court to challenge five articles in the Copyright Law No. 28/2014, aiming to establish a fairer and more transparent royalty system for performers in the music industry.
- 18 February – The Mineral and Coal Mining law is officially ratified.
- 19 February
  - President Prabowo Subianto inaugurates six officials in the first cabinet reshuffle in the Red-White Cabinet, one of whom is Brian Yuliarto as Minister of Higher Education, Science, and Technology replacing Satryo Soemantri Brodjonegoro.
  - A fire at the Pasaraya Blok M building at Jakarta spreads from the 7th floor, causing hundreds of workers to escape into the building's yard.
- 20 February:
  - Following the 2024 Indonesian local elections, 961 regional heads, consisting of 33 governors, 33 vice governors, 363 regents, 362 vice regents, 85 mayors and 85 vice mayors are inaugurated at the central field of presidential palace, Central Jakarta.
  - Secretary general of Indonesian Democratic Party of Struggle (PDI-P), Hasto Kristiyanto, is officially arrested by the Corruption Eradication Commission in the bribery case against commissioner of General Elections Commission, Wahyu Setiawan.
- 24 February – The Daya Anagata Nusantara Agency for Investment Management is established, and can manage around Rp. 14.72 quadrillion funds ($900 billion).
- 25 February – The Attorney General's Office names seven people as suspects in a corruption case involving state-owned energy company PT. Pertamina Patra Niaga, a subsidiary of PT. Pertamina (Persero), and private contractors. The alleged irregularities that occurred between 2018 and 2023 reportedly resulted in state losses of Rp. 193.7 trillion (US$12 billion) per year. However, the losses have almost reached Rp1 quadrillion, which is Rp. 968.5 trillion (US$58.96 billion).
- 26 February – Industry Minister Agus Gumiwang Kartasasmita announces an agreement with Apple Inc. for the latter to build facilities in Bandung and Batam amid efforts to end a ban by Indonesia on the sale of iPhone 16 devices.
- 28 February – A fire in Pondok Bambu destroys multiple residences.

=== March ===
- 6 March – Governor of West Java, Dedi Mulyadi orders the demolition of Hibisc Fantasy, an amusement park at Puncak, Bogor Regency that was only opened December last year, due to concerns of causing flash floods in Jakarta.
- 10 March
  - At least 53 inmates escape from the Kutacane Penitentiary in Aceh.
  - Singer Riefian Fajarsyah, known as Ifan Seventeen, is appointed as President Director of Produksi Film Negara (PFN), sparking controversy due to his limited experience in the film industry.
- 17 March – Three policemen are shot dead by two TNI members while raiding a cockfighting arena at the village of Karang Manik in Way Kanan Regency, Lampung.
- 18 March — A magnitude 5.6 earthquake hits North Tapanuli Regency in North Sumatra, killing one person.
- 19 March — A package containing a pig's head is delivered to the office of the magazine Tempo by an online courier.
- 20 March —
  - The House of Representatives (DPR) officially ratifies the revision of Indonesian National Armed Forces Law, which would allow military officers to hold civilian office without leaving the service, in a plenary session.
  - The Lewotobi volcano erupts in Flores, cancelling flights.
- 22 March — A second package, wrapped in floral paper and containing six decapitated rats, is found outside the office of the magazine Tempo.
- 26 March — One person is killed while two others are reported missing following the collapse of a nickel waste disposal site in the Morowali Industrial Park.

=== April ===
- 3 April — Ten people are killed in a landslide that buries two vehicles along a hilly road near Watu Lumpang in Mojokerto Regency, East Java.
- 9 April — Seventeen people are killed in an attack by the West Papua National Liberation Army on a gold panning camp in Yahukimo Regency, Highland Papua.
- 11 April
  - The iPhone 16 goes on sale in Indonesia.
  - At least 18 structures are damaged following a shallow 5.6 magnitude earthquake in Bogor.
- 17 April — Minister of Public Works Dody Hanggodo dissolves the Capital City of Nusantara Infrastructure Construction Task Force.
- 24 April — The animated film Jumbo surpasses six million viewers in under a month, becoming Indonesia's most-viewed animated film to date.

=== May ===
- 2 May —
  - An island-wide power outage hits Bali.
  - West Java governor Dedi Mulyadi implements a military barracks program in several areas that are considered vulnerable, such as Purwakarta and Bandung.
- 5 May — KMP Muchlisa sinks at Balikpapan Bay, possibly due to propeller damage, killing two passengers.
- 6 May — A bus overturns near Padang, killing 12 people and injuring 23 others.
- 7 May
  - A dump truck collides with a minibus carrying teachers in Purworejo, Central Java, killing 11 passengers on the bus.
  - American Tangerang Hawks basketball player Jarred Shaw is arrested after 132 pieces of cannabis candies are discovered in a raid on his apartment in Tangerang Regency.
  - A truck belonging to the Indonesian National Army carrying ammunition explodes while traveling from Surabaya to Jember, killing two soldiers.
- 11 May — The Soviet spacecraft Kosmos 482 crashes into the sea near Jakarta after being in orbit for 53 years.
- 12 May
  - A tourist boat sinks off Tikus Island, Bengkulu, killing seven people.
  - Thirteen people, including four soldiers, are killed in an explosion during the disposal of unusable and expired ammunition at an environmental conservation area in Garut Regency, West Java.
- 14 May — Eighteen suspected West Papua National Liberation Army militants are killed in a clash with government forces in Intan Jaya Regency, Central Papua.
- 16 May —
  - Two police officers are killed by the West Papua National Liberation Army in Puncak Jaya Regency, Central Papua.
  - At least six miners are killed while 14 others are reported missing following a landslide near a gold mine in the Arfak Mountains in West Papua.
- 18 May — The government raises its highest volcanic eruption level over Mount Lewotobi in Flores following a major eruption.
- 20 May — In the largest drug bust in Indonesian history, two tons of crystal methamphetamine are seized from a fishing boat off the Riau Islands, resulting in six arrests.
- 22 May — A magnitude 5.7 earthquake hits Bengkulu, killing one person from a heart attack.
- 24 May – Death of Argo Ericko Achfandi, a student at Faculty of Law at Gadjah Mada University, who was killed by a BMW car driven by an international undergraduate program student at Faculty of Economic and Business from the same university.
- 30 May — Seventeen people are killed in a collapse at a quarry in Cirebon Regency.

=== June ===
- 10 June — The government revokes the operating permits of four mining firms in Raja Ampat, citing regulatory violations.
- 14 June — An Australian national is killed in a shooting inside a villa in Badung Regency, Bali.
- 17 June — The government raises its highest volcanic eruption level over Mount Lewotobi in Flores following a major eruption.
- 23 June – The National Narcotics Board announces it arrested 285 people, including 29 women and seven foreigners, and seized over 0.68 ton of narcotics in a two-month crackdown operation on narcotrafficking and illegal drug abuse.
- 24 June – The body of Juliana Marins, a Brazilian tourist who fell while hiking near the crater of Mount Rinjani in Lombok on 21 June is recovered.

=== July ===
- 3 July – The ferry KMP Tunu Pratama Jaya traveling from Banyuwangi in East Java to Bali sinks in the Bali Strait, killing at least six people and leaving 29 others missing and 30 rescued.
- 7 July — Two major eruptions occur at Mount Lewotobi in Flores, causing the cancellation of at least 24 flights at Ngurah Rai International Airport in Bali.
- 10 July — A truck in Bali suffers brake failure and collides with several vehicles and buildings, killing four people.
- 14 July
  - A speedboat capsizes during a storm off the coast of Mentawai Islands Regency, resulting in the rescue of all 18 passengers on board.
  - The Minister of Finance imposes a tax of 0.5% generated by traders to collect Article 22 Income Tax, through the Minister of Finance Regulation Number 37 of 2025 (PMK No. 37/2025).
  - Start of teaching and learning activities for the 2025/2026 in academic year
- 16 July —
  - The Attorney General's Office of Indonesia (Kejagung) initially names four people as suspects in the Chromebook procurement scandal amidst its ongoing investigation, namely Sri Wahyuningsih, Mulyatsyah, Jurist Tan, and Ibrahim Arief, and caused state losses of Rp. 1.9 trillion.
  - The United States and Indonesia reach a trade agreement in which US tariffs on Indonesian exports would be reduced from 32% to 19% in exchange for full access for US firms in Indonesia.
- 18 July
  - Three people are killed in a stampede at a wedding celebration in Garut, West Java.
  - Former Trade Minister Thomas Lembong is sentenced to 4.5 years in prison for corruption in sugar imports.
- 19–20 July – The PSI Congress in Solo, Central Java, is led by former president Joko Widodo. Kaesang Pangarep is reelected as Chairman of the Indonesian Solidarity Party (PSI) for the 2025-2030 term.
- 20 July – The ferry KM Barcelona 5 catches fire off Talise Island, North Sulawesi, killing six people on board, including a pregnant woman.
- 21 July – President Prabowo launches the Red and White Cooperative in 80,081 village/sub-district cooperatives.
- 22 July – Southeast Asian haze: Authorities announce the arrest of 44 suspects on suspicion of starting wildfires in Riau.

=== August ===
- 1 August –
  - An eruption occurs at Mount Lewotobi in Flores.
  - Around 1,178 prisoners are released as part of a comprehensive clemency plan by President Prabowo, among them include Thomas Lembong and Hasto Kristiyanto.
  - The Indonesian Financial Transaction Reports and Analysis Center (PPATK) opens access to 28–30 million previously blocked inactive accounts, following public debate regarding the temporary freezing of transactions in dormant accounts.
- 3 August – A Quicksilver GT500 trainer aircraft of the Indonesian Aerosports Federation crashes in Bogor Regency, West Java, killing the two people on board including an Indonesian Air Force commodore.
- 4–17 August – 2025 FIVB Volleyball Women's U21 World Championship
- 11 August –
  - Indonesia and Peru sign a Comprehensive Economic Partnership Agreement to boost trade and cooperation, marking 50 years of diplomatic relations.
  - Scientists announce the discovery of 1.48-million-year-old stone tools on Sulawesi, providing evidence of the oldest known Wallacean hominids.
- 13 August – A demonstration in Pati Regency, Central Java, is held in response to demands that Pati Regent Sudewo resign for raising the Rural and Urban Land and Building Tax (PBB-P2) by 250%. At least 34 people are injured and 11 others arrested.
- 15 August – Around 365 people are taken ill after consuming lunchtime meals delivered to schools in Sragen, Central Java.
- 17 August – A magnitude 5.8 earthquake hits Central Sulawesi, killing one person.
- 20 August — Deputy Minister of Manpower Immanuel Ebenezer along with other 10 people are arrested and subsequently named as suspects by the Corruption Eradication Commission, following their involvement in an extortion case relating to occupational safety and health certificate administration.
- 25 August
  - A demonstration is held by students and workers in front of the MPR/DPR/DPD building in South Jakarta in protest over various government policies, including plans to raise DPR members' salaries and the dissolution of the DPR RI.
  - At least 17 people are reported to have died in an outbreak of measles in East Java, with all but one fatality recorded in Sumenep Regency.
- 27 August — 2025 Indonesian local elections
- 28 August — A 21-year-old Gojek delivery rider, Affan Kurniawan, dies after being run over by a police vehicle during demonstrations in Jakarta, triggering an escalation in ongoing anti-government protests.
- 29 August — A fire breaks out at the headquarters of the South Sulawesi Regional House of Representatives in Makassar during an anti-government protest, killing three people.
- 30 August – Several residences of members of the DPR, such as Ahmad Sahroni, Eko Patrio, and Uya Kuya, are looted by mobs during anti-government protests.
- 31 August — The residences of finance minister Sri Mulyani Indrawati and MP Nafa Urbach in South Tangerang are looted during anti-government protests.

=== September ===
- 1 September —
  - An Airbus BK117 D-3 operated by EastIndo and carrying eight people from Kotabaru Regency, South Kalimantan, to Palangkaraya, Central Kalimantan, crashes in Tanah Bumbu Regency, South Kalimantan, killing all eight occupants on board.
  - An Indonesian diplomat is shot dead in Lima, Peru, in a suspected contract killing.
- 3 September – Around 400 children are taken ill after consuming free school meals in Bengkulu.
- 4 September – Nadiem Anwar Makarim, the co-founder of online app Gojek, is arrested as part of an investigation into an alleged Rp. 1.9 trillion ($115 million) corruption scandal linked to the government’s procurement of Google Chromebook laptops for schools when he was education minister from 2019 to 2024.
- 5 September – The deadline for the 17 demands of the 17+8 Demands, includes six parties being sued: President Prabowo, the DPR, the Chairpersons of Political Parties, the Indonesian National Police, the Indonesian National Armed Forces, and the Ministry of Economic Affairs. The remaining eight demands are due by August 31, 2026.
- 7 September – A community hall collapses in Bogor Regency, West Java, during a Mawlid prayer recital, killing four people and injuring 84 others.
- 8 September –
  - President Prabowo implements a cabinet reshuffle that results in the replacement of five ministers, including finance minister Sri Mulyani Indrawati and security minister Budi Gunawan.
  - Seven people are trapped following a landslide at the Grasberg mine in Central Papua.
- 10 September – An Intan Angkasa Air Service PK-IWS operated by PT Angkasa Pura and carrying four people from Mimika Regency, to Ilaga, Puncak Regency, crashes in Mimika Regency, Central Papua, killing all four occupants on board.
- 12 September
  - The government officially launches the Nusantara Lima Satellite (SNL) from Cape Canaveral in the United States, using a SpaceX Falcon 9 rocket.
  - At least 23 people are killed while five others are reported missing following days of flash floods and landslides in Bali and East Nusa Tenggara.
- 14 September – A tourist bus overturns in Sukapura, Probolinggo, East Java, killing six people.
- 17 September
  - President Prabowo inaugurates several more ministers following his cabinet reshuffle. Among those inaugurated are Erick Thohir as Minister of Youth and Sports and Djamari Chaniago as Coordinating Minister for Political, Legal, and Security Affairs.
  - National Police Chief General Listyo Sigit Prabowo forms a nine-person National Police Transformation Reform Team, involving 52 officers and the Head of the Education and Training Institute as its Chairperson.
- 19 September – A magnitude 6.6 earthquake hits Central Papua, damaging several buildings in Nabire Regency.
- 20 September – A magnitude 4.2 earthquake hits West Java, damaging 14 houses in Sukabumi Regency.
- 23 September – Indonesia signs the Indonesia-European Union Comprehensive Economic Partnership Agreement (CEPA) with the European Union.
- 24 September –
  - At least 1,333 schoolchildren are reported to have fallen ill after consuming free school lunches in Cipongkor, West Bandung Regency in West Java.
  - Indonesia signs a free trade agreement with Canada.
- 25 September – A magnitude 5.2 earthquake hits East Java, destroying 21 houses in Situbondo Regency.
- 27 September – The Raja Ampat Islands are designated as a biosphere reserve by UNESCO.
- 29 September –
  - An under-construction building at the Al-Khoziny Islamic Boarding School collapses in Sidoarjo, East Java, killing 67 people and injuring 103 others.
  - A technical issue during a transmission line upgrade causes a blackout affecting more than 700,000 customers in Aceh.
- 30 September – A magnitude 6.0 earthquake hits East Java, injuring six people in Sumenep Regency.

=== October ===
- 2 October – The DPR passes the fourth revision of the State-Owned Enterprises Law. The positions of Minister and Deputy Minister of State-Owned Enterprises will automatically be eliminated and dissolved, as the Ministry of State-Owned Enterprises is transformed into the State-Owned Enterprises Regulatory Agency.
- 8 October – President Prabowo adds two new deputy ministerial positions, namely Akhmad Wiyagus as Deputy Minister of Home Affairs and Benjamin Paulus Octavianus as Deputy Minister of Health. In addition, the President also inaugurated 10 Ambassadors Extraordinary and Plenipotentiary (LBBP).
- 9 October – The government refuses entry to athletes of the Israel Gymnastics Federation competing at the 2025 World Artistic Gymnastics Championships in Jakarta, citing its longstanding policy with regards to Palestine.
- 10 October – A magnitude 7.4 earthquake with an epicenter off the coast of the southern Philippines triggers tsunamis that reach heights of up to 17 cm (6.7 in) in parts of Talaud Islands Regency in North Sulawesi.
- 15 October —
  - The government raises its highest volcanic eruption level over Mount Lewotobi in Flores following a major eruption.
  - Authorities announce the discovery of traces of cesium 137 at a clove plantation in Lampung Province following a ban imposed by the United States on Indonesian shrimp and spice exports.
  - Ten people are killed in an explosion aboard a crude palm oil tanker at a shipyard in Tanjung Uncang, Batam.
  - The Indonesian Army claims to have killed 14 West Papua National Liberation Army militants following clashes in the village of Soanggama in Intan Jaya Regency, Central Papua.
- 16 October – A magnitude 6.5 earthquake hits Papua, destroying 20 homes in Sarmi Regency.
- 19-25 October – 2025 World Artistic Gymnastics Championships in Jakarta.
- 21 October – Indonesia and the United Kingdom sign an agreement allowing for the repatriation of two British nationals held on death row and life imprisonment respectively for drug trafficking. The repatriation proceeds on 7 November.
- 22 October – The International Olympic Committee recommends against Indonesia hosting international sports events or meetings in response to its earlier entry ban on Israeli athletes.

=== November ===
- 5 November – A magnitude 4.7 earthquake hits North Kalimantan, injuring two people.
- 7 November – An explosion occurs at a mosque of a high school complex in North Jakarta, injuring 96.
- 10 November – President Prabowo designates 10 individuals (Suharto, Abdurrahman Wahid, Marsinah, Mochtar Kusumaatmadja, Rahmah el Yunusiyah, Sarwo Edhie Wibowo, Sultan Muhammad Salahuddin, Syaikhona Muhammad Kholil, Tuan Rondahaim Saragih, and Zainal Abidin Syah) as National Heroes of Indonesia.
- 13 November – Landslides caused by heavy rains in Cilacap Regency, Central Java kill at least 20 people and leave three missing.
- 14 November – A minibus carrying Chinese tourists crashes into a tree in Buleleng Regency, Bali, killing five people.
- 15 November – A landslide kills at least three people and leaves 25 others missing in Banjarnegara Regency, Central Java.
- 19 November — The government raises its highest volcanic eruption level over Mount Semeru in East Java following a major eruption. Around 178 people stranded on the mountain are rescued.
- 21 November — The World Health Organization declares an end to a nationwide polio outbreak that began in Aceh in 2022.
- 26 November — Cyclone Senyar makes landfall in northern Sumatra, causing flash floods and landslides in Aceh, North Sumatra, and West Sumatra. At least 1,200 deaths, over 7,000 injuries, and 143 missing persons are reported, with estimated economic losses of 68.67 trillion rupiah (US$4.12 billion)
- 27 November —
  - A magnitude 6.3 earthquake hits Simeulue island in Aceh, injuring 12 people.
  - A giant panda is born in Indonesia for the first time after Hu Chun, a panda kept at Taman Safari in Cisarua, West Java, gives birth to a cub named Satrio "Rio" Wiratama.

=== December ===
- 2 December – Indonesia and the Netherlands sign an agreement to repatriate two Dutch nationals imprisoned for drug trafficking, one of whom is on death row. The repatriation is concluded on 8 December.
- 9 December — At least 22 people are killed in a fire at a seven-storey office building in Kemayoran, Central Jakarta.
- 9—20 December — Indonesia at the 2025 SEA Games
- 15 December — Flash floods hit Jember, East Java.
- 16 December — KRL Commuterline officially operates two new electric rail train (KRL) sets produced by PT INKA for the Jabodetabek Commuter Line service.
- 20 December — Flash floods severely damage the Guci hot springs tourist area in Tegal Regency, Central Java.
- 22 December — A bus hits a concrete barrier before overturning on the Krapyak Toll Road in Semarang, killing 16 people and injuring 18 others.
- 26 December — A cruise ship sinks off the coast of Padar Island, killing Spanish footballer Fernando Martín and leaving three others missing.
- 28 December —
  - Heavy rains trigger flash floods in Balangan Regency, South Kalimantan.
  - A magnitude 4.7 earthquake hits West Sumatra, destroying 10 houses in Agam Regency.
  - Sixteen people are killed in a fire at a retirement home in Manado.
- 29 December — A tornado destroys around 30 houses in the village of Pondok Udik in Kemang district, Bogor Regency.

== Holidays ==
- 1 January – New Year's Day
- 27 January – Isra' and Mi'raj
- 29 January – Chinese New Year
- 29 March – Day of Silence
- 31 March–1 April – Lebaran
- 18 April – Good Friday
- 20 April – Easter
- 1 May – International Workers' Day
- 12 May – Vesak Day
- 29 May – Ascension Day
- 1 June – Pancasila Day
- 7 June – Eid al-Adha
- 27 June – Islamic New Year
- 17 August – Independence Day
- 5 September – Prophet's Birthday
- 25 December – Christmas Day

== Deaths ==
- 10 April – Titiek Puspa, 87, singer
- 1 July – Hamdan ATT, 79, singer
- 28 July – Kwik Kian Gie, 90, economist
- 3 August – Fajar Adriyanto, 55, Air Force pilot
- 10 August – Opi Bachtiar, 43, actor and fashion designer
- 15 August – Nina Carolina, 38, comedian and host
- 17 September – Yurike Sanger, 80, presidential spouse (Sukarno)
- 2 October – Clara Sumarwati, 58, mountaineer
- 6 October – Karlinah Djaja Atmadja Wirahadikusumah, 95, social activist, second lady of Indonesia (1983–1988)
- 17 October – Alfred Gonti Pius Datubara, 91, auxiliary bishop (1975–1976) and archbishop (1976–2009) of Medan
- 2 November – Pakubuwono XIII, 77, 13th Susuhunan of Surakarta (since 2004)
- 8 November – Antasari Azhar, 72, chairman of the Corruption Eradication Commission (2007–2009)
- 29 November – Gary Iskak, 51, actor
- 3 December – Epy Kusnandar, 61, actor, comedian and singer
