= Al-Khoziny Islamic Boarding School collapse =

2025 building collapse in Indonesia

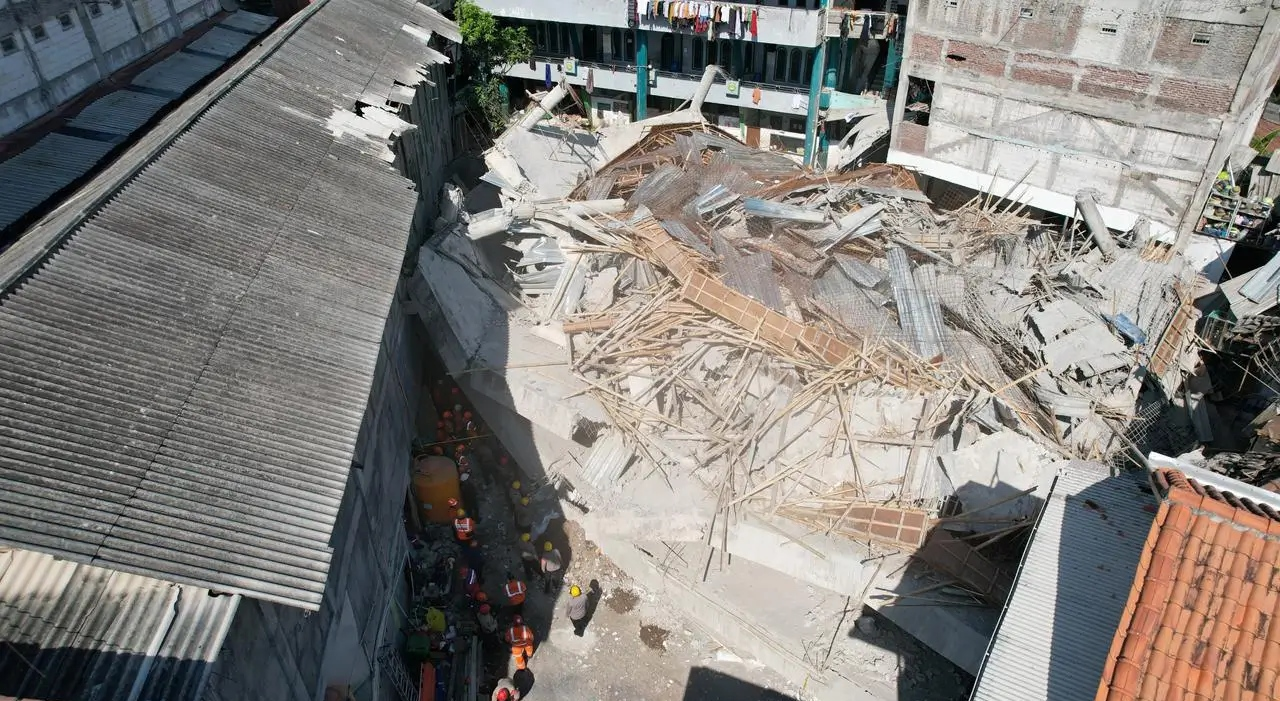
- Aerial view of the site
- Date: 29 September 2025; 13 months ago
- Time: c. 15:00 WIB (UTC+07:00)
- Location: Sidoarjo Regency, East Java, Indonesia; 7°25′41″S 112°43′26.5″E
- Cause: Structural failure
- Deaths: 67
- Injuries: 103 (Note: This included at least 27 serious injuries and 76 minor injuries.)

On 29 September 2025, a three-story prayer room at the Al-Khoziny Islamic Boarding School (pondok pesantren) in Sidoarjo Regency, East Java, Indonesia, collapsed while students were performing congregational Asr prayers. On 7 October 2025, the National Search and Rescue Agency reported 67 deaths, 103 injuries, and 8 unidentified body parts which might belong to the same victim. According to the National Agency for Disaster Countermeasure (BNPB), the collapse was the deadliest non-natural disaster in Indonesia in 2025.

The building was initially two stories tall, with expansion work underway at the time of the collapse. Investigators have pointed to overloading of vertical supports and foundation elements, alongside possible unauthorized construction and insufficient permitting, as leading causes of the catastrophic failure. The collapse led to wide regional and national scrutiny of building safety in pesantren, intensified calls for regulatory reform, and formal demands for accountability from school management and local officials.

== Background ==
=== Al-Khoziny boarding school ===
Al-Khoziny, also known as Pondok Pesantren Al-Khoziny (or Pesantren Buduran), is a long-established Islamic boarding school located in Buduran, Sidoarjo, East Java. It was formally founded in 1927 on land owned by KHR Mohammad Abbas Khozin, though accounts indicate that students were already studying there as early as 1920. The pesantren is known for its traditional stance, including intensive study of classical Islamic texts (kitab kuning) and the sorogan and bandongan methods of instruction. Over time it has grown to include formal education levels and has developed affiliated higher-education institutions.

Al-Khoziny is reported to have over 2,000 santri (students), spanning levels from junior high up through formal higher education.

=== Construction ===
The musalla at Al-Khoziny had been under development for about nine to ten months prior to its final stages. According to the pesantren's leadership, the structure was planned as a three-story building, plus a deck (slab/roof) at the very top. The lower floor(s) were intended for daily prayer (musalla functions), while the upper floors were to serve as meeting or gathering halls for santri. The construction was part of a broader renovation project of the pesantren, which had proceeded in stages over the preceding months.

Materially, the building employed reinforced concrete, steel or iron reinforcement, and temporary supports such as bamboo or scaffolding used during the concrete casting process. The topmost floor and its roof slab (deck) were in the final casting phase when the finishing works were underway. The outer walls were reportedly still unpainted, the facade uncompleted (bare concrete or structural elements visible), and the building's appearance showed signs typical of mid-construction state.

Another notable aspect was the involvement of santri (students) in some construction duties. In addition to professional workers, some santri were assigned to assist with tasks such as mixing/concreting on upper levels, sometimes as a form of penalty for not participating in certain pesantren activities. Time of day also featured in the construction schedule: the leadership stated that on certain days, the casting work was done in the morning and completed by midday for that stage of work, especially for the roof slab or at the topmost layer.

== Collapse ==
=== Prior to collapse ===
In the days and hours before the collapse at the Al-Khoziny Islamic Boarding School, the musala building was undergoing significant structural work, notably the casting (pouring of concrete) of its top floor or roof slab. It had been under construction for about nine to ten months. Some students reported hearing sounds of falling small stones as the concrete work was in progress. One of the student witnesses noted that during the mid-morning or afternoon concrete casting work:

Indonesian: Ada truk ngecor, mau ngecor yang paling atas … langsung full.

[There was a concrete truck ... they poured the very top part all at once.]

there was no staged or partial filling; rather, heavier load was being placed all at once on the upper floors.

Another witness, a student named Wahid, recalled that the prayer room seemed to sway briefly before the major failure occurred, suggesting that there may have been perceptible movement in the structure when load was applied. Despite these warning signs, there is no widely reported indication that formal warnings were issued or that construction was paused. The building remained in use for prayers and student activities even while construction was ongoing.

=== Collapse ===
On the afternoon of 29 September 2025 about 15:00 WIB, while santri were performing Asr prayers in the musala (prayer room) of Al-Khoziny, eyewitnesses report a sudden onset of the collapse. According to a 16-year-old santri, Nanang Saifur Rizal, the event occurred during the third rak'a of the prayer; “there was a sound like bamboo falling, then a tremor,” and almost instantly, the building began to fall apart. Another santri, Muhammad Rijalul Qoib (13), said he heard what sounded like a truck pouring concrete at the topmost level, then without gradual increase or staging, the load was applied fully and the middle part of the building gave way first. As parts of the structure failed, concrete slabs and supports collapsed, with beams, bamboo scaffolding and other construction materials falling into the prayer area. Putra (13), a survivor, described being under falling debris:

Indonesian: Banyak batu berjatuhan, bambu-bambu penyangga juga ikut ambruk.

[Many stones fell down, and the supporting bamboo poles also collapsed.]

and being knocked down to his back by a piece of metal roofing. He was trapped, unable to move much, under darkness and dust. Others in the middle saf were thrown into disarray: dust filled the air, structural components collapsed fast, and immediate panic as santri tried to scramble away from the collapse zone.

Another survivor, Muhammad Wahyudi (13) from Surabaya, recalled that he lost consciousness at first, and when he came to, found himself surrounded by concrete debris, unable to move. Life under the rubble was grueling with no clear sense of time, no light, and only the faint presence of another friend also trapped nearby.

Indonesian: Pas sadar, saya lihat di sekitar cuma reruntuhan beton. Di bawah kaki saya ada teman yang masih hidup juga, tapi sama-sama nggak bisa bergerak. Kami cuma bisa berbaring, suasananya gelap dan pengap.

[When I came to, all I saw around me was rubble and concrete debris. Beneath my feet was a friend who was still alive too, but neither of us could move. We could only lie there, it was dark and stifling.]

Rescue operations began almost immediately, though hindered by unstable debris and the risk of secondary collapse. Teams including SAR, police, and locals responded to urgent calls, digging through the rubble, and checking small voids for survivors. Some students were pulled out alive after being trapped for long periods (e.g., Putra was trapped for three days). The structure failure is often described as “pancake model” by officials: multiple floors collapsing directly onto one another, creating layers of debris that made immediate rescue more difficult.

=== Rescue efforts ===
Several rescue agencies were mobilized almost immediately after the collapse. Over 400 personnel from Basarnas, TNI-Polri, BPBD, PMI, volunteers, and other related agencies worked day and night in 24-hour shifts. Damkar Surabaya also deployed its Heavy Duty Rescue unit, which included specialized equipment such as “first camera” and “life detector” tools that could detect victims in tight or obscured spaces under the rubble. The search was particularly urgent because dozens of students were believed to be trapped, many between the ages of about 12 to 19.

Rescuers worked around the clock, including during the night. They dug through debris, called out names, and used tools, sensors, and thermal-sensing drones to try to detect survivors. Aid such as oxygen, food, water, and IV drips was provided to those who were reachable through small gaps or voids beneath the rubble. The rescue teams also conducted assessments to decide when and where heavy machinery like cranes could safely be deployed.

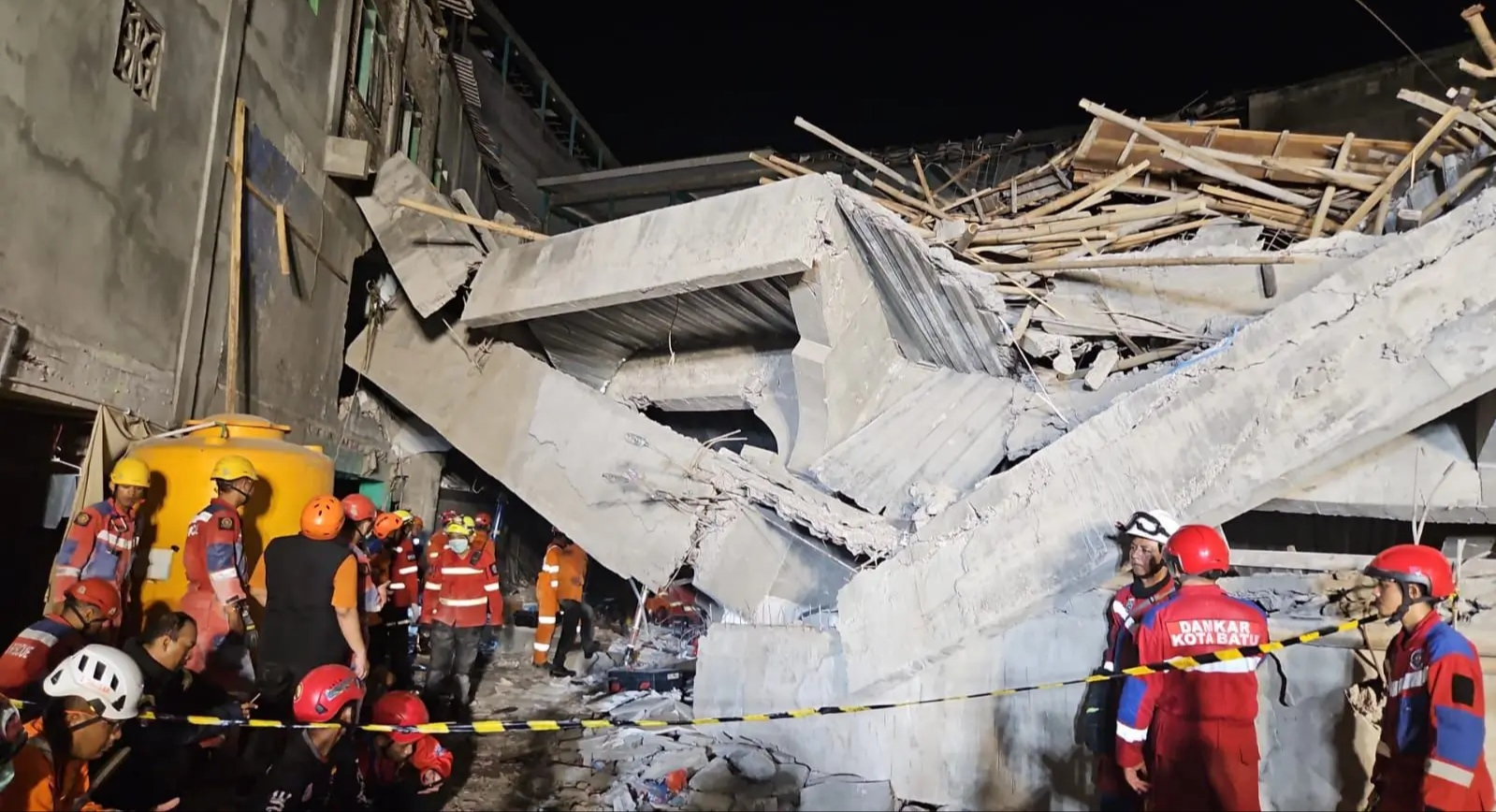
The SAR team continues to search and rescue operations for victims of the rubble.

One major challenge in the operation was the risk of further collapses or shifting debris. Rescue officials frequently emphasized that vibrations or pressure from heavy equipment could worsen the situation. Because of this, even though heavy machinery (cranes, excavators) were on standby, their use was delayed until it was assessed to be safe and after obtaining consent from families of the missing. Another complication was that some victims were trapped in very narrow spaces, such as near main columns, side columns, and under slabs that had compressed under the weight of the load, leaving only small voids. Access to these spots required tunnel-like passages, special cameras, and careful manual excavation.

On 1 October, a 6.5-magnitude earthquake struck Sumenep Regency in East Java, approximately 200 kilometers from the school. This significantly hampered ongoing rescue operations at the collapsed school. According to Mohammad Syafii, head of Basarnas, the quake compacted the debris, reducing the available space for trapped victims. He noted that what was initially a 50-centimeter gap between rubble was compressed to just 10 centimeters, increasing the difficulty of accessing survivors. The earthquake also heightened concerns about the structural integrity of the remaining building, as vibrations from the tremor could potentially cause further collapses. Rescue teams had to exercise extreme caution when operating heavy machinery, such as cranes and excavators, to avoid additional harm to both victims and rescuers.

After several days after the collapse, rescue operations had shifted focus from trying to find survivors to recovering the deceased, once officials believed the “golden period” (typically about 72 hours after collapse) had passed. By then, signs of life beneath the rubble had not been detected through the advanced tools being used. The teams then worked to safely clear debris, coordinate use of heavy equipment with safety in mind, and ensure victims could be recovered and given proper treatment or burial.

Disaster victim identification (DVI) teams faced significant challenges in establishing the identities of the deceased. Traditional methods such as fingerprinting became unreliable due to decomposition, while dental records were largely unhelpful because many of the victims had similar dental development. Clothing and personal effects also failed to distinguish individuals, as many wore identical school uniforms. As a result, DNA testing was adopted as the primary means of identification, families provided DNA samples which were then matched with remains transported to Bhayangkara Police Hospital in Surabaya. By 6 October, authorities had officially identified and handed over 17 bodies to families, while others remained under investigation.

As of 7 October 2025, the cleanup operation at the collapse site has been completed. Basarnas declared that all areas of the rubble had been cleared and no further victims were believed to remain. All recovered remains and body parts have been transferred to the DVI team, and further management of the site, including debris disposal and safety assessment, has been turned over to the National Agency for Disaster Countermeasure.

== Investigations ==
Investigators, led by the East Java police together with structural engineering experts from the Sepuluh Nopember Institute of Technology (ITS) and the Ministry of Public Works, have focused on possible overloading of the structure as the primary cause. According to the BNPB, the building was originally two stories (plus roof structures), but the collapse happened during ongoing expansion works that added additional slabs and floors. These extra loads appear to have exceeded the capacity of vertical supports (columns and footings) and the foundation, leading to failure.

Investigations have flagged issues of unauthorized construction work and lack of necessary permits or formal oversight. Local officials and BNPB noted that the expansion being done on the upper stories was carried out in a manner that did not evidently follow regulatory safety and building code standards. The foundation and supporting columns were not upgraded or reinforced appropriately to handle the added weight, and there was no visible evidence that proper structural assessments or engineering design adjustments were made prior to or during the construction.

Analysts and engineers quoted in the press have characterized the collapse as following the so-called "pancake" pattern, where floors collapse onto one another in a vertical stacking of slabs. This structural mode makes internal voids (gaps) very small, complicating rescue efforts and amplifying damage. The compressed debris arrangement also increases the risk of secondary collapse as rescuers attempt to penetrate the structure, so investigation teams stressed that debris removal had to be done with extreme caution.

Public Works Minister Dody Hanggodo said that of some 42,000 pesantren in Indonesia only around 50 have valid building permits, and it remains unclear whether Al-Khoziny was among them.

== Casualties ==
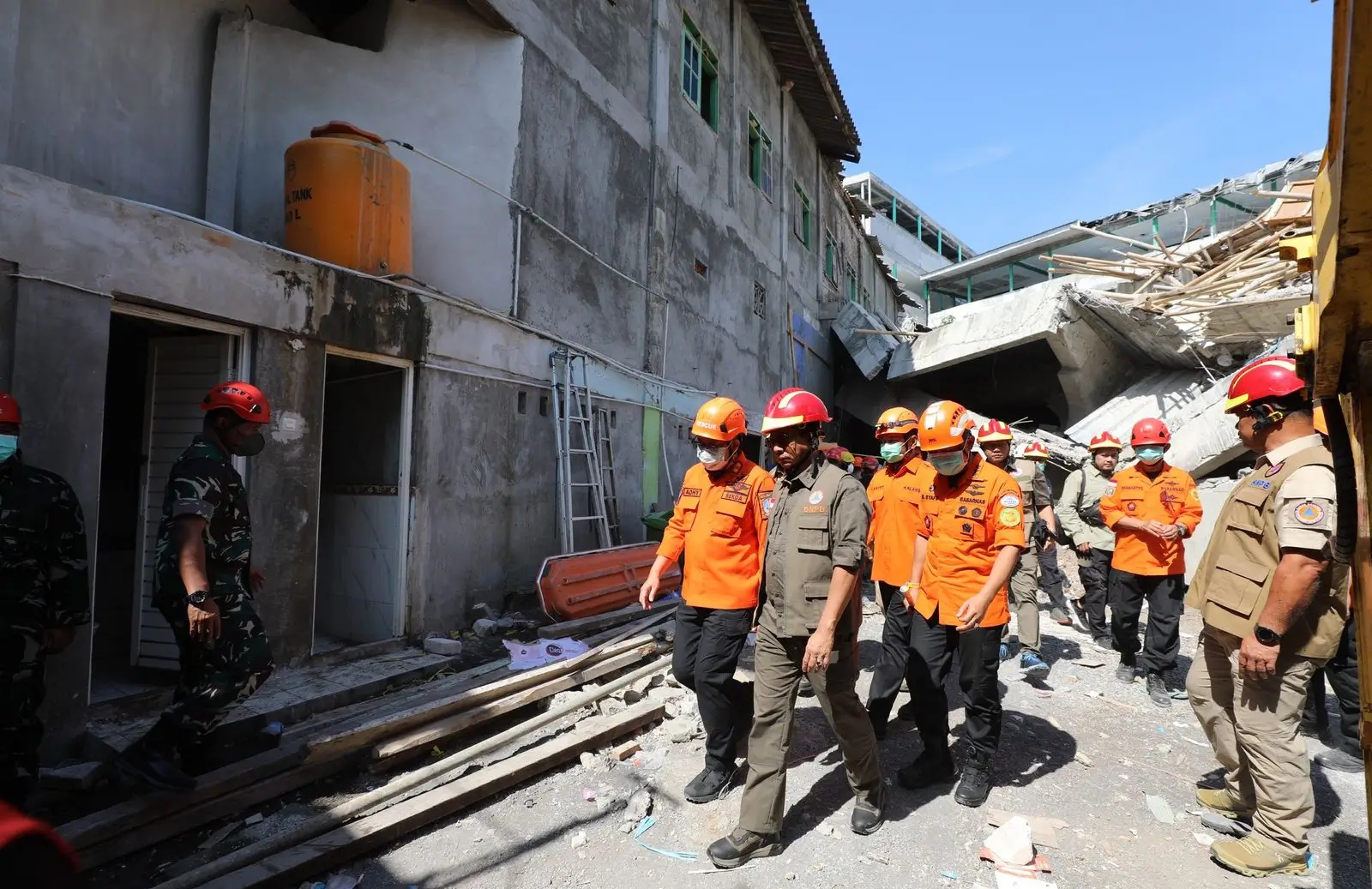
The National Agency for Disaster Countermeasure during evacuation

According to the National Agency for Disaster Countermeasure (BNPB), there were a total of 171 victims in was the collapse, consisting of 104 survivors, 67 deaths, and one person who returned home. Of the casualties who survived, 14 people are still under treatment in hospital, 89 people were allowed to go home and one person was referred to a hospital in Mojokerto. The SAR Mission Coordinator, First Admiral TNI Yudhi Bramantyo, explained that the process of searching of victims took a long time as the joint SAR team had to first lift and destroy building materials.

== Aftermath ==
=== Reactions ===
KH Abdus Salam Mujib, the caretaker of the pesantren, publicly responded to the tragedy by expressing remorse, stating the incident as part of divine will, and asking for patience from the victims’ families. He also explained that the musala was in the final stages of concreting, a process which had been underway for about nine to ten months, and affirmed that the upper floors had not yet been used for regular activities.

Indonesian: Ya saya kira ini takdir dari Allah, jadi semuanya harus bisa bersabar. Dan mudah-mudahan juga diberi diganti oleh Allah yang lebih baik. Diberi pahala yang sangat-sangat, apa ya, nggak bisa mengutarakan dan mudah-mudahan dibalas kebaikan oleh Allah SWT yang lebih dari musibah ini.

[Yes, I think this is the will of Allah, so everyone must be patient. Hopefully, Allah will also replace it with something better. May we be granted immense rewards — so great that I cannot even express them — and may Allah SWT repay us with goodness far beyond this calamity.]

— KH Abdus Salam Mujib,

In his remarks, Mujib also stated that ongoing rescue efforts were the pesantren's immediate priority, and that educational and religious activities at the institution would be suspended for the time being.

Nasaruddin Umar, as Indonesia's Minister of Religious Affairs, expressed deep condolences and personally visited the site in Sidoarjo to assess the damage and meet with victims’ families. He affirmed that the collapse would become a point of evaluation for the ministry's construction oversight of pesantren, madrasas, and religious educational facilities, emphasizing the need to integrate stricter technical and safety standards. He announced plans for the ministry to coordinate with public works and relevant institutions to develop clearer building criteria for pesantren, and he voiced hope that such a tragedy would not be repeated in the future.

President Prabowo Subianto expressed deep sorrow over the tragedy. President Prabowo conveyed his condolences through the Head of the National Disaster Management Agency, Lieutenant General Suharyanto. He expressed profound sympathy for the victims and their families, urging them to remain patient and hopeful during this challenging time.

Tri Rismaharini, former Minister of Social Affairs and former Mayor of Surabaya, visited the disaster site and met with the families of the santri to express her empathy and concern. She offered words of comfort, reminding them to stay strong and patient, and urged that the search and rescue process be handled with utmost care given the unstable conditions of the rubble. Tri Rismaharini suggested using a T-shaped structural support device and digging a trench around the collapsed structure to control runoff or water accumulation, which could affect safety or hamper access for rescue teams.

Subandi, Regent of Sidoarjo, began by expressing profound sorrow over the tragedy, stating that his administration would ensure the evacuation and search efforts would continue until completed. He visited hospitals caring for injured students and joined officials at the site, committing that no effort would be spared in locating victims still trapped under the rubble.

=== Response ===
In the days following the collapse, families of the students pressed for legal accountability. On 6 October 2025, several families formally demanded that law enforcement agencies investigate the Al-Khoziny management and its contractors for possible negligence or manslaughter charges. Many parents and guardians reportedly prefer to accept the tragedy as fate, due in part to cultural respect for the kyai.

At the national level, the House of Representatives also voiced that the government must intervene more assertively. Maman Imanulhaq, a member of the VIII Commission, called for the central and local governments to share responsibility, including ensuring that pesantren development is tracked, regulated, and safe. He urged more active government participation in supervising construction projects at pesantren.

Local government in Sidoarjo, under Regent Subandi, acknowledged that the collapsed structure reportedly lacked valid building approval according to preliminary statements. He announced that all 129 pesantren in Sidoarjo would undergo safety audits in cooperation with engineering experts, such as those from ITS, to ensure compliance with legal and technical standards.

The Public Works Ministry announced it would audit building permit issuance and enforcement protocols in districts with pesantren, and has considered issuing directives requiring all religious institutions to submit as-built structural assessments for state review. Reports indicate that only about 50 of Indonesia’s 42,000 pesantren have formal building permits.

Indonesian government has formally committed to rebuilding the collapsed prayer hall and associated structures of Al-Khoziny from the ground up, rather than attempting patch-ups. The reconstruction will be fully funded by the national budget although the government has indicated openness to supplementary assistance from the private sector. Minister Dody Hanggodo has reasoned that demolition and rebuilding will be more cost-effective than repairing the severely damaged existing building. Although pesantren normally fall under the oversight and budgeting of the Ministry of Religious Affairs, the urgency of the disaster prompted the Public Works Ministry to take charge of the reconstruction effort. The government is still finalizing the exact budget needed, and comparing cost estimates among stakeholders before breaking ground.

=== Reconstruction ===
By December 2025, formal reconstruction of the pesantren has commenced with the laying of the groundbreaking for the new building in Siwalanpanji, Sidoarjo, supported by a significant allocation of state budget funds. Coordinating Minister for Community Empowerment Muhaimin Iskandar emphasized the importance of quality, transparency, and timely execution of reconstruction works, which are budgeted at approximately Rp125 billion ($7.4 million) and designed to create durable, modern educational facilities including dormitories, classrooms, and a mosque on a 4,100 square-meter site. Reconstruction is targeted for completion by July 2026.
