= 2024 Southeast Sulawesi gubernatorial election =

- 27 November 2024
- Turnout: 81.93% (▲13.48pp)
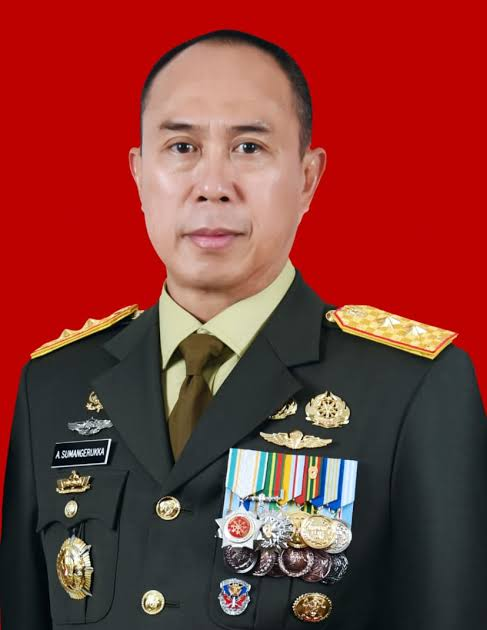

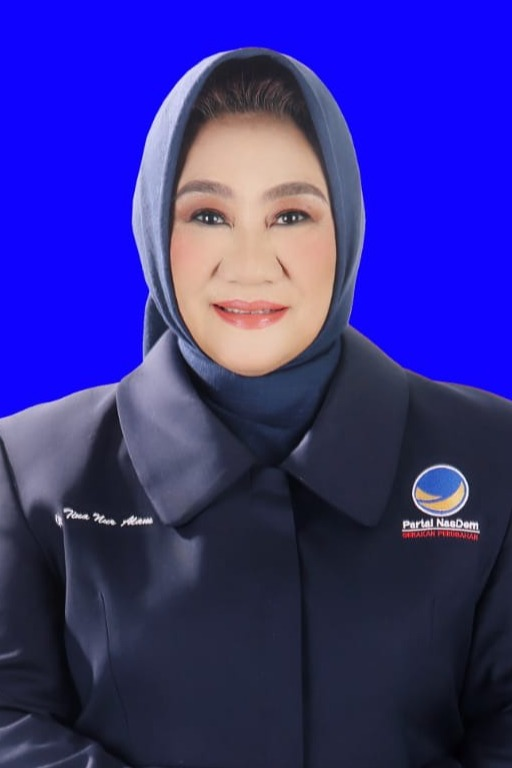

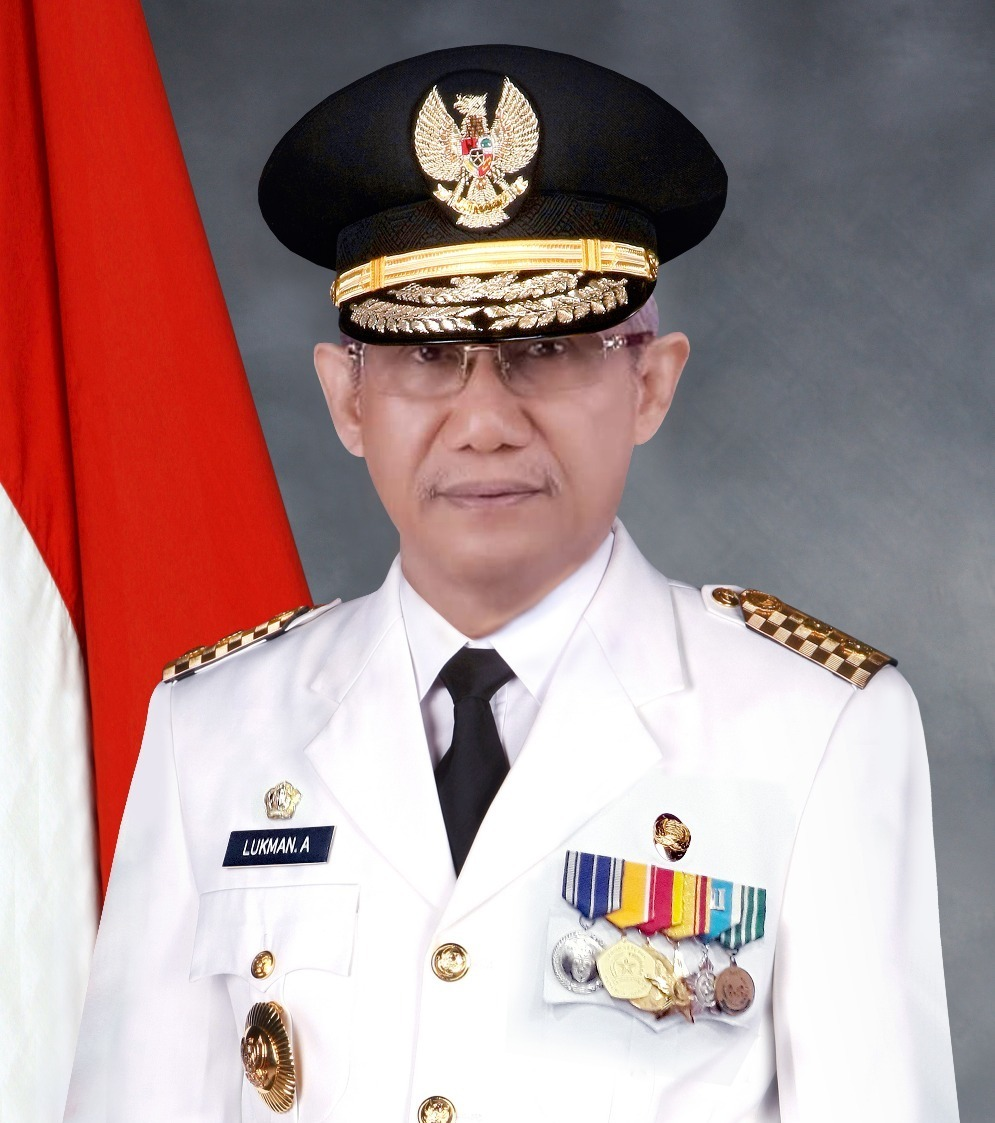

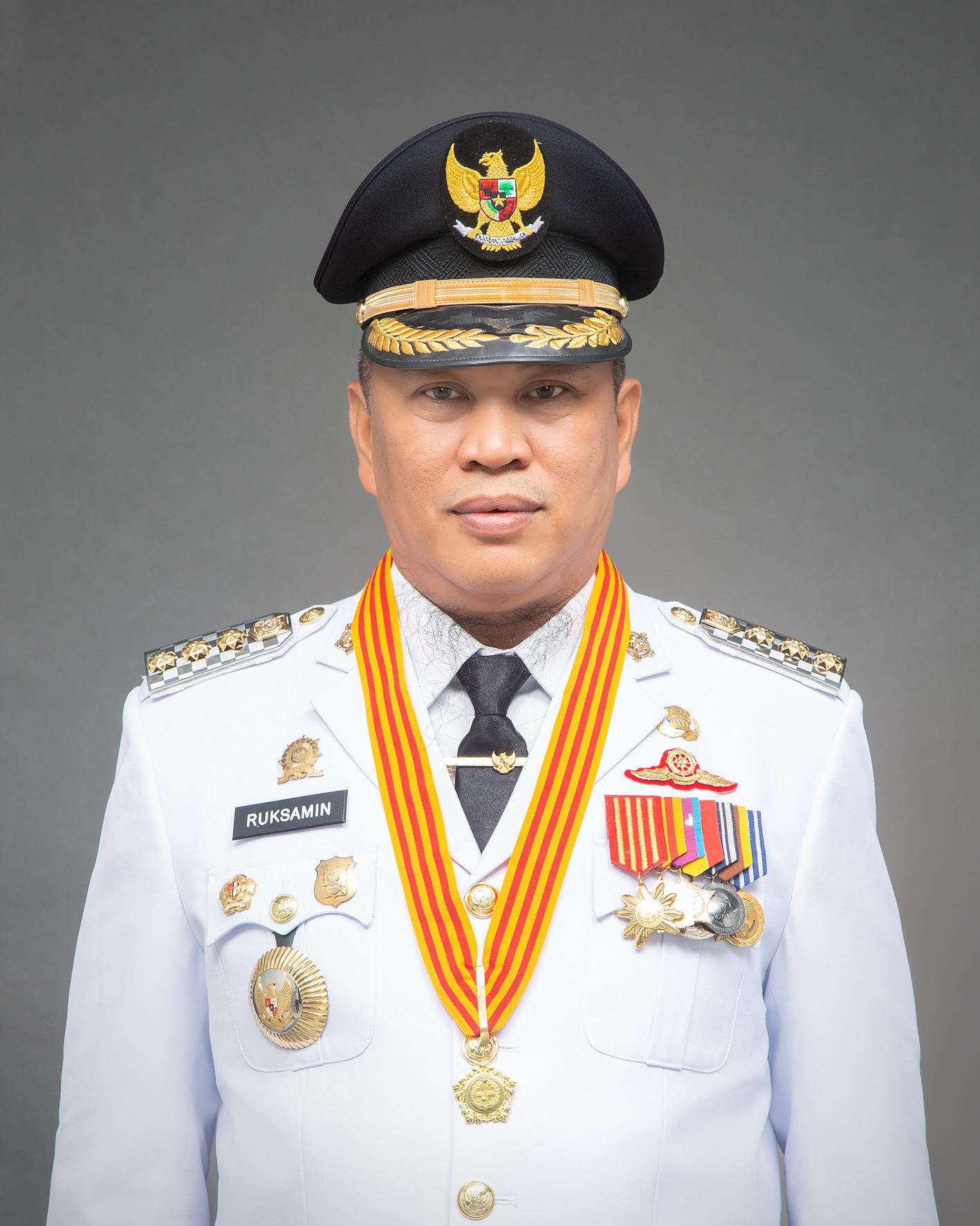
Candidate	Andi Sumangerukka	Tina Nur Alam
Party	PPP	NasDem
Alliance	KIM Plus	–
Running mate	Hugua	La Ode Muhammad Ihsan
Popular vote	775,183	308,373
Percentage	52.39%	20.84%
Candidate	Lukman Abunawas	Ruksamin
Party	PDI-P	PBB
Running mate	Laode Ida	LM Sjafei Kahar
Popular vote	246,393	149,642
Percentage	16.65%	10.11%
- Results by district
Governor before election
Andap Budhi Revianto (acting)
Independent
Elected Governor
Andi Sumangerukka
PPP

The 2024 Southeast Sulawesi gubernatorial election was held on 27 November 2024 as part of nationwide local elections to elect the governor of Southeast Sulawesi for a five-year term. The previous election was held in 2018. Andi Sumangerukka of the United Development Party (PPP) won the election with 52% of the vote. The NasDem Party's Tina Nur Alam, a former member of the House of Representatives, placed second with 20%. Former Vice Governor Lukman Abunawas of the Indonesian Democratic Party of Struggle (PDI-P) received 16%, and former North Konawe Regent Ruksamin of the Crescent Star Party (PBB) received 10% of the vote.

== Electoral system ==
The election, like other local elections in 2024, follow the first-past-the-post system where the candidate with the most votes wins the election, even if they do not win a majority. It is possible for a candidate to run uncontested, in which case the candidate is still required to win a majority of votes "against" an "empty box" option. Should the candidate fail to do so, the election will be repeated on a later date.

== Candidates ==
According to electoral regulations, in order to qualify for the election, candidates were required to secure support from a political party or a coalition of parties controlling 9 seats (20 percent of all seats) in the Southeast Sulawesi Regional House of Representatives (DPRD). As no parties won 9 or more seats in the 2024 legislative election, parties are required to form coalitions to nominate a candidate. Candidates may alternatively demonstrate support to run as an independent in form of photocopies of identity cards, which in Southeast Sulawesi's case corresponds to 186,794 copies. No independent candidates registered with the General Elections Commission (KPU) prior to the set deadline.

The previous governor, Ali Mazi, had served two terms (2003–2008 and 2018–2023), and was ineligible to run in the election, instead participating in the 2024 legislative election for a seat in the House of Representatives.

=== Potential ===
The following are individuals who have either been publicly mentioned as a potential candidate by a political party in the DPRD, publicly declared their candidacy with press coverage, or considered as a potential candidate by media outlets:

- Lukman Abunawas (PDI-P), previous vice governor.
- Ruksamin (PBB), two-term regent of North Konawe.
- Kery Saiful Konggoasa (Nasdem), former two-term regent of Konawe.
- Hugua (PDI-P), member of the House of Representatives, former regent of Wakatobi.
- Tina Nur Alam (Nasdem), member of the House of Representatives.
- Andi Sumangerukka (PPP), former commander of Kodam XIV/Hasanuddin.
- Bahtiar Maddatuang, academic.

== Political map ==
Following the 2024 Indonesian legislative election, eleven political parties are represented in the Southeast Sulawesi DPRD:

Political parties	Seat count
NasDem Party	6 / 45
Indonesian Democratic Party of Struggle (PDI-P)	6 / 45
Party of Functional Groups (Golkar)	6 / 45
Great Indonesia Movement Party (Gerindra)	5 / 45
Prosperous Justice Party (PKS)	4 / 45
Democratic Party (Demokrat)	4 / 45
Crescent Star Party (PBB)	4 / 45
National Awakening Party (PKB)	3 / 45
National Mandate Party (PAN)	3 / 45
United Development Party (PPP)	3 / 45
People's Conscience Party (Hanura)	1 / 45

== Results ==
Candidate	Running mate	Party	Votes	%
Andi Sumangerukka	Hugua	United Development Party	775,183	52.39
Tina Nur Alam	La Ode Muhammad Ihsan	NasDem Party	308,373	20.84
Lukman Abunawas	Laode Ida	Indonesian Democratic Party of Struggle	246,393	16.65
Ruksamin	LM Sjafei Kahar	Crescent Star Party	149,642	10.11
Total			1,479,591	100.00
Valid votes			1,479,591	96.23
Invalid/blank votes			58,028	3.77
Total votes			1,537,619	100.00
Registered voters/turnout			1,876,792	81.93
Source: KPU

Candidate vote share by district
Ruksamin–Sjafei

Andi–Hugua

Lukman–Ida

Tina–Ihsan
