= EastIndo =

Indonesian airline

IATA	ICAO	Call sign
-	ESD	EASTINDO
- Hubs: Halim Perdanakusuma International Airport
- Fleet size: 6
- Headquarters: Jakarta, Indonesia
- Website: http://www.eastindo.com/

EastIndo is a charter airline based in Jakarta, Indonesia. Eastindo is listed in category 2 by Indonesian Civil Aviation Authority for airline safety quality.

== Destinations ==
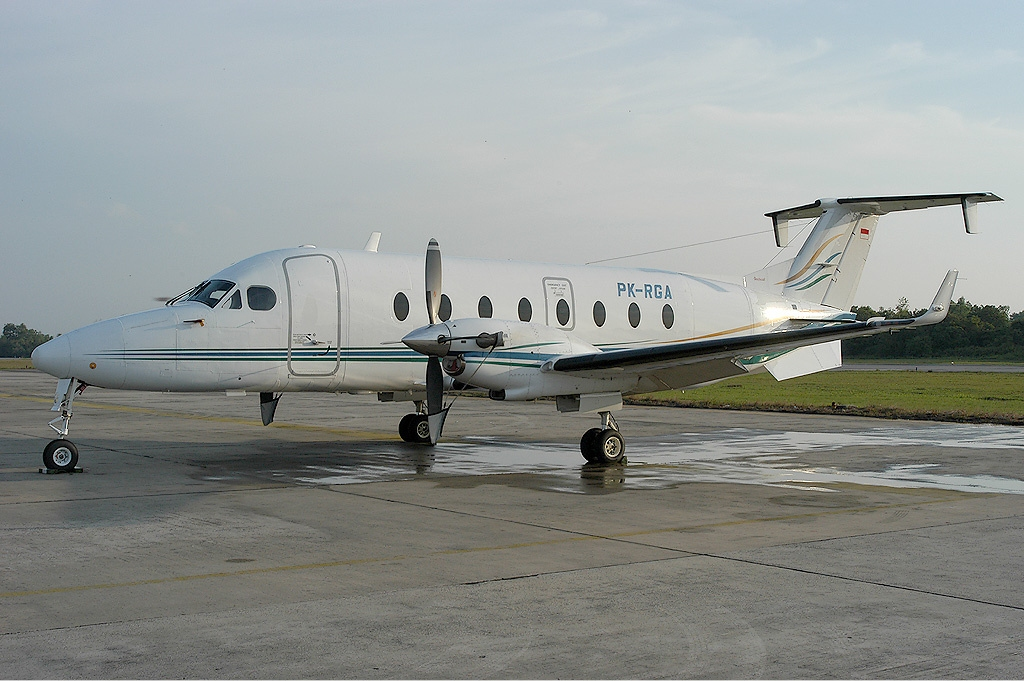
EastIndo Raytheon

As of 2025, the airline serves only two routes to Pekanbaru and Singapore (Seletar)

- Jakarta - Halim Perdanakusuma International Airport (hub)
- Pekanbaru - Sultan Syarif Kasim II International Airport
- Singapore - Seletar Airport

== Fleet ==
The EastIndo fleet includes the following aircraft (as of May 2017):

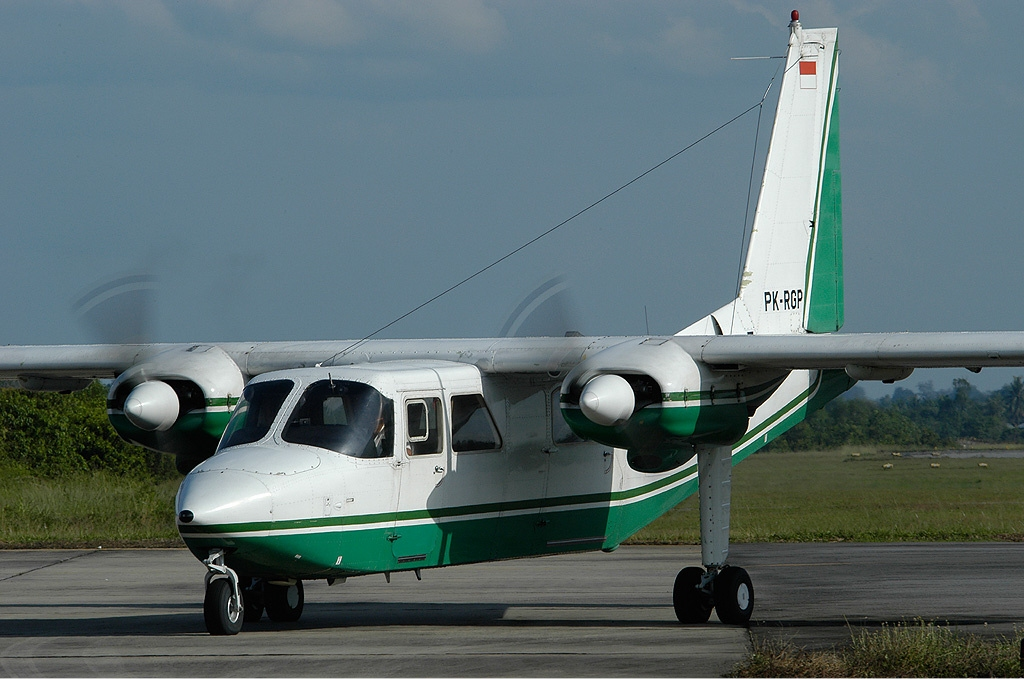
EastIndo Islander at Sultan Syarif Kasim II International Airport

- 2 Beechcraft B1900D (as of July 2026)
- 2 Britten-Norman Islander
- 2 Airbus Helicopter AS350

== Accidents and incidents ==
On 1 September 2025 an EastIndo MBB/Kawasaki BK 117 helicopter, operating a flight from Gusti Syamsir Alam Airport to Tjilik Riwut Airport, crashed in Tanah Bumbu Regency, South Kalimantan, killing all 8 occupants on board.
