= Ministry of Public Works (Indonesia) =

Government ministry

- Kementerian Pekerjaan Umum
- Logo of the Ministry of Public Works

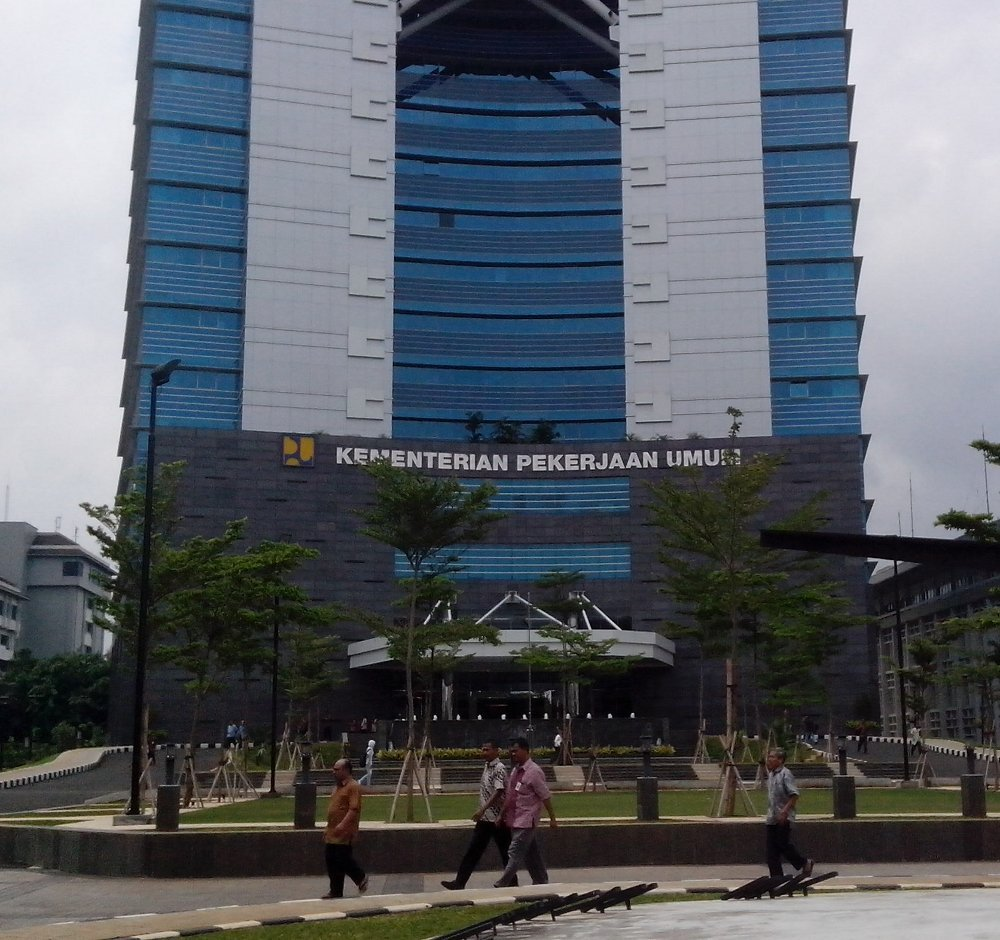
- Ministry of Public Works headquarters

Agency overview
- Jurisdiction: Government of Indonesia
- Headquarters: Jalan Pattimura No. 20 Kebayoran Baru Jakarta Selatan 12110 Jakarta, Indonesia
- Minister responsible: Dody Hanggodo, Minister of Public Works
- Agency executive: Diana Kusumastuti, Deputy Minister of Public Works
- Website: www.pu.go.id

The Ministry of Public Works (Indonesian: Kementerian Pekerjaan Umum; abbreviated as Kemen PU), is an Indonesian government ministry that is responsible for public works. The ministry is under the responsibility of the President. Since 21 October 2024, the ministry is led by Dody Hanggodo.

== History ==
=== Dutch East Indies period ===
The term "Public Works" is a translation of the Dutch term Openbare Werken which was called Water Management Works (Waterstaatswerken) during the Dutch East Indies era. The Government Center, built by the Department of Transport and Water Management (Departement van Verkeer & Waterstaat, Dep.V & W), were led by a director, who oversees several departments (Afdelingen) and services (Diensten) in accordance with the duties / authorities of the department.

The department also covers the public works (openbare werken) including afdeling Waterstaat, with afdelingen (afd.) parts: public building (Lands gebouwen), road (Wegen), irrigation (Irrigatie), and sanitation (Assainering), Hydropower (Waterkracht), Constructie burreau (for bridges). The department also covers afd. Havenwezen (Harbor), afd. Electriciteitswezen (Electrical) and afd. Luchtvaart (Civil Aviation).

The regulations issued during the Dutch East Indies era for guidelines in carrying out tasks in the Public Works can be read in "A.W.R". 1936 B.W.R. 1934 and "W.V.O./W.V.V.".

=== Japanese period ===
After the Dutch surrendered in the Pacific war in 1942, to Japan, the Indonesian area was divided by Japan into three administrative regions, namely Java/Madura, Sumatra and East Indonesia and there was no highest Government Center in Indonesia which controlled the government areas.

In the field of public works in each of the areas of the Japanese Military Government organization mentioned above, an organization in the Dutch East Indies era was needed and adjusted to the provisions of the Japanese side. The head office "V & W" in Bandung was renamed Kotubu Bunsitsu (交通部分室). Since then, the term 'Pekerjaan Oemoem' (PO), 'Oeroesan Pekerdjaan Oemoem' (OPO), 'Pekerjaan Umum' (PU), and doboku (土木) was commonly used.

Kotubu Bonsitsu in Bandung only has relations with the Government area in Java/Madura, while the relations with outside of Java did not exist. Public Works Organizations in the regions and residents generally stand on their own. There is some work implementation system that uses the system and the name of the Dutch Indies era, other than Japanese system.

=== Indonesian period ===
After Indonesia proclaimed independence on 17 August 1945, the Indonesian youths began to gradually seize power from the Japanese government, both in the central government (Jakarta / Bandung) and regional governments. After the Indonesian government formed the first Cabinet, the Minister began to formulate its organization and character. Public Works at that time (1945) was based in Bandung, taking the place of the former V & W building (known as Gedung Sate).

When the Dutch wanted to restore governmental power in the Dutch East Indies before the war, they came to follow the Allied Forces into Indonesia. As a result of the urges of the Dutch government, there was a physical conflict with the Indonesian Youth who wanted to defend their homeland and the occupied buildings, including the "Gedung Sate" which had become the Public Works Department Building at that time (this historic event is known as the "incident" of 3 December 1945, marked as an anniversary in the Ministry of Public Works).

During the National revolution from 1945 to 1949, the Indonesian Central Government in Jakarta was forced to flee to Purworejo and then to Yogyakarta, as well as the Ministry of Public Works, and later on to Bukitinggi. After the Dutch Government in 1949 recognized the independence of the Republic of Indonesia, the center of the Indonesian government in Yogyakarta was moved again to Jakarta and the Ministry was reformed as the Ministry of Public Works and Energy of the United States of Indonesia.

Since 1945, the Public Works (PU) has often undergone changes in leadership and organization, according to the political situation at that time. In the beginning of the formation of the Unitary Republic of Indonesia, the composition of the Ministries changed due to the changing situation of the times.

Guided Democracy soon elevated the Ministry of Public Works into prestige as president Sukarno mandated the ministry's work in national construction to build a stronger nation. In the mid-1960s, there was a large Cabinet called the Dwikora Cabinet or the Cabinet of 100 Ministers. The Public Works Ministry also experienced organizational changes in the 60s and in the middle of the decade split into five distinct Ministries under the Dwikora Cabinet led under General Suprajogi, Coordinating Minister for Public Works. These ministries under the Coordinating Ministry were:

- Department of Electricity and Power (Departemen Listrik dan Ketenagaan), for electricity affairs
- Department of Public Highways (Departemen Bina Marga), for highway construction and maintenance
- Construction Industry Department (Departemen Cipta Karya Konstruksi)
- Water Resources Department (Departemen Pengairan Dasar)
- Trans-Sumatra Highway Department (Departemen Jalan Raya Sumatra)

After the G.30S PKI event, the Government immediately formed the Revised Dwikora Cabinet and among others, appointed Ir Soetami who succeeded Suprajogi as Coordinating Minister for Public Works.

The reunified public works ministry was formed during the Ampera Cabinet, which was the first Cabinet during the New Order era and Ir. Soetami remained in his post. With the Decree of the Minister of PUT dated 17 June 1968 N0.3 / PRT / 1968 and amended by the Ministerial Decree of PUT dated 1 June 1970 Number 4 / PRT / 1970, the ministerial structure was amended to suit the changing methods of construction of public works projects. As a further illustration of the division of tasks within the public works department, the public work duties at that time was handled and being managed by the regional authorities themselves.

This setup lasted until 2024, when the Ministry of Housing and Residential Areas was created.

== Structure ==
The structure of the Ministry was expanded by the Minister of Public Works Regulation No. 1/2024 and 1/2025 into:

1. Office of the Minister of Public Works
2. Office of the Deputy Minister of Public Works
3. Board of Experts
  1. Senior Expert to the Minister on Integrative Development
  2. Senior Expert to the Minister on Economy and Investment
  3. Senior Expert to the Minister on Social, Culture, and Community Participation
  4. Senior Expert to the Minister on Inter-institutional Partnership
  5. Senior Expert to the Minister on Technology, Industry, and Environment
4. Secretariat General
  1. Office of the Secretary General
  2. Bureau of Budget Planning and International Cooperation
  3. Bureau of Personnel, Organization, and Procedures
  4. Bureau of Financial Affairs
  5. Bureau of General Affairs
  6. Bureau of Legal Affairs
  7. Bureau of State-owned Asset Management
  8. Bureau of Public Communication
  9. Centers (attached to the Secretariat)
    1. Center for Policy Implementation Analysis
    2. Center for Data and Information Technology
    3. Center for Regional Infrastructure Facilitation
5. Directorate General of Water Resources (Directorate General I)
  1. Secretariat for Directorate General of Water Resources
  2. Directorate of Water Resources Management System and Strategies
  3. Directorate of Water Resources Engineering
  4. Directorate of River and Coasts
  5. Directorate of Irrigation and Lowlands
  6. Directorate of Dams and Lakes
  7. Directorate of Groundwater and Bulk Water
  8. Directorate of Operation and Maintenance
  9. Directorate of Internal Compliance
  10. National Water Resources Council Secretariat
  11. River Basin Organizations
    1. Type "A" Centers-level
      1. River Basin Organization for Sumatra VIII Region, Palembang
      2. River Basin Organization for Mesuji-Sekampung, Bandar Lampung
      3. River Basin Organization for Cidanau-Ciujung-Cidurian, Serang
      4. River Basin Organization for Ciliwung-Cisadane, Jakarta
      5. River Basin Organization for Citarum, Bandung
      6. River Basin Organization for Cimanuk-Cisanggarung, Cirebon
      7. River Basin Organization for Pemali-Juana, Semarang
      8. River Basin Organization for Serayu-Opak, Yogyakarta
      9. River Basin Organization for Bengawan Solo, Surakarta
      10. River Basin Organization for Brantas, Surabaya
      11. River Basin Organization for Pompengan-Jeneberang, Makasssar
    2. Type "B" Centers-level
      1. River Basin Organization for Sumatra II Region, Medan
      2. River Basin Organization for Citanduy, Banjar
      3. River Basin Organization for Nusa Tenggara I Region, Mataram
      4. River Basin Organization for Nusa Tenggara II Region, Kupang
    3. Institute-level
      1. River Basin Organization for Sumatra I Region, Banda Aceh
      2. River Basin Organization for Sumatra III Region, Pekanbaru
      3. River Basin Organization for Sumatra IV Region, Batam
      4. River Basin Organization for Bangka Belitung, Pangkalpinang
      5. River Basin Organization for Sumatra V Region, Padang
      6. River Basin Organization for Sumatra VI Region, Jambi
      7. River Basin Organization for Sumatra VII Region, Bengkulu
      8. River Basin Organization for Bali-Penida, Denpasar
      9. River Basin Organization for Kalimantan I Region, Pontianak
      10. River Basin Organization for Kalimantan II Region, Palangkaraya
      11. River Basin Organization for Kalimantan III Region, Banjarmasin
      12. River Basin Organization for Kalimantan IV Region, Samarinda
      13. River Basin Organization for Kalimantan V Region, Tanjung Selor
      14. River Basin Organization for Sulawesi I Region, Manado
      15. River Basin Organization for Sulawesi II Region, Gorontalo
      16. River Basin Organization for Sulawesi III Region, Palu
      17. River Basin Organization for Sulawesi IV Region, Kendari
      18. River Basin Organization for Sulawesi V Region, Mamuju
      19. River Basin Organization for Maluku, Ambon
      20. River Basin Organization for North Maluku, Ternate
      21. River Basin Organization for Papua, Jayapura
      22. River Basin Organization for West Papua, Manokwari
      23. River Basin Organization for Merauke, Merauke
  12. Engineering Institutes
    1. Indonesian Engineering Institute for Dam Engineering, Jakarta
    2. Indonesian Engineering Institute for Coastal Engineering, Buleleng
    3. Indonesian Engineering Institute for Rivers Engineering, Surakarta
    4. Indonesian Engineering Institute for Lowlands, Banjarmasin
    5. Indonesian Engineering Institute for Irrigation, Bekasi
    6. Indonesian Engineering Institute for Sabo Dams, Yogyakarta
  13. Directorate General-controlled Center(s)
    1. Center for Sidoarjo Mud Flow Containment
      1. Administrative Division
      2. Planning Division
      3. Embankments and Drainages Construction Division
      4. Embankments and Drainages Operation and Maintenance Division
  14. Directorate General-controlled Institutes
    1. Indonesian Institute for Hydraulics and Water Geotechnics, Bandung
    2. Indonesian Institute for Groundwater, Bandung
    3. Indonesian Institute for Hydrology and Water Environment, Bandung
6. Directorate General of Highways (Directorate General II)
  1. Secretariat for Directorate General of Highways
  2. Directorate of Road and Bridge Management System and Strategies
  3. Directorate of Road and Bridge Engineering
  4. Directorate of Road Construction
  5. Directorate of Bridge Construction
  6. Directorate of Road and Bridge Preservation for Region I (Sumatra, Kalimantan, Jawa, and Bali Islands)
  7. Directorate of Road and Bridge Preservation for Region II (Nusa Tenggaras, Sulawesi, All Mouccas, and Papua Islands)
  8. Directorate of Freeways
  9. Directorate of Internal Compliance
  10. National Toll Roads Authority Secretariat
  11. National Road Implementation Agencies
    1. Type "A" Centers-level
      1. National Road Implementation Agency for North Sumatera Region, Medan
      2. National Road Implementation Agency for South Sumatera Region, Palembang
      3. National Road Implementation Agency for Jakarta-West Java Regions, Jakarta
      4. National Road Implementation Agency for Central Java-Yogyakarta Regions, Semarang
      5. National Road Implementation Agency for East Java-Bali Regions, Surabaya
      6. National Road Implementation Agency for South Sulawesi Region, Makassar
      7. National Road Implementation Agency for East Kalimantan Region, Balikpapan
    2. Type "B" Centers-level
      1. National Road Implementation Agency for Papua-Highland Papua Regions, Jayapura
      2. National Road Implementation Agency for West Papua-Southwest Papua Regions, Manokwari
    3. Institute-level
      1. National Road Implementation Agency for Aceh Region, Banda Aceh
      2. National Road Implementation Agency for Riau Region, Pekanbaru
      3. National Road Implementation Agency for Riau Island Region, Batam
      4. National Road Implementation Agency for West Sumatera Region, Padang
      5. National Road Implementation Agency for Jambi Region, Jambi
      6. National Road Implementation Agency for Bengkulu Region, Bengkulu
      7. National Road Implementation Agency for Bangka Belitung Region, Pangkal Pinang
      8. National Road Implementation Agency for Lampung Region, Bandar Lampung
      9. National Road Implementation Agency for Banten Region, Serang
      10. National Road Implementation Agency for West Nusa Tenggara Region, Mataram
      11. National Road Implementation Agency for East Nusa Tenggara Region, Kupang
      12. National Road Implementation Agency for West Kalimantan Region, Pontianak
      13. National Road Implementation Agency for South Kalimantan Region, Banjarmasin
      14. National Road Implementation Agency for North Kalimantan Region, Tanjung Selor
      15. National Road Implementation Agency for Central Kalimantan Region, Palangkaraya
      16. National Road Implementation Agency for North Sulawesi Region, Manado
      17. National Road Implementation Agency for Gorontalo Region, Gorontalo
      18. National Road Implementation Agency for Central Sulawesi Region, Palu
      19. National Road Implementation Agency for Southeast Sulawesi Region, Kendari
      20. National Road Implementation Agency for West Sulawesi Region, Mamuju
      21. National Road Implementation Agency for Maluku Region, Ambon
      22. National Road Implementation Agency for North Maluku Region, Ternate
      23. National Road Implementation Agency for South Papua Region, Merauke
      24. National Road Implementation Agency for Central Papua Region, Nabire
  12. Engineering Institutes
    1. Indonesian Engineering Institute for Road Materials and Road Hardening, Bandung
    2. Indonesian Engineering Institute for Bridges Safety and Special Tunnels, Bandung
    3. Indonesian Engineering Institute for Geoengineering, Tunnels, and Structures, Bandung
    4. Indonesian Engineering Institute for Road Networks and Road Environment, Bandung
7. Directorate General of Human Settlements (Directorate General III)
  1. Secretariat of Directorate General of Human Settlements
  2. Directorate of Settlement Infrastructure Implementation System and Strategies
  3. Directorate of Building Engineering and Environmental Fitness
  4. Directorate of Building Management
  5. Directorate of Water Supply
  6. Directorate of Sanitation
  7. Directorate of Strategic Infrastructure Development
  8. Directorate of Internal Compliance
  9. Agencies for Building, Facilities, and Regional Management
    1. Type "A" Centers-level
      1. Agency for Building, Facilities, and Regional Management of Aceh Region, Banda Aceh
      2. Agency for Building, Facilities, and Regional Management of North Sumatera Region, Medan
      3. Agency for Building, Facilities, and Regional Management of Riau Region, Pekanbaru
      4. Agency for Building, Facilities, and Regional Management of Riau Island Region, Batam
      5. Agency for Building, Facilities, and Regional Management of West Sumatera Region, Padang
      6. Agency for Building, Facilities, and Regional Management of South Sumatera Region, Palembang
      7. Agency for Building, Facilities, and Regional Management of Lampung Region, Bandar Lampung
      8. Agency for Building, Facilities, and Regional Management of Banten Region, Serang
      9. Agency for Building, Facilities, and Regional Management of Metropolitan Jakarta Region, Jakarta
      10. Agency for Building, Facilities, and Regional Management of West Java Region, Bandung
      11. Agency for Building, Facilities, and Regional Management of Central Java Region, Semarang
      12. Agency for Building, Facilities, and Regional Management of Yogyakarta Region, Yogyakarta
      13. Agency for Building, Facilities, and Regional Management of East Java Region, Surabaya
      14. Agency for Building, Facilities, and Regional Management of Bali Region, Denpasar
      15. Agency for Building, Facilities, and Regional Management of West Nusa Tenggara Region, Mataram
      16. Agency for Building, Facilities, and Regional Management of East Nusa Tenggara Region, Kupang
      17. Agency for Building, Facilities, and Regional Management of West Kalimantan Region, Pontianak
      18. Agency for Building, Facilities, and Regional Management of South Kalimantan Region, Banjarmasin
      19. Agency for Building, Facilities, and Regional Management of Central Kalimantan Region, Palangkaraya
      20. Agency for Building, Facilities, and Regional Management of North Kalimantan Region, Tanjung Selor
      21. Agency for Building, Facilities, and Regional Management of East Kalimantan Region, Samarinda
      22. Agency for Building, Facilities, and Regional Management of North Sulawesi Region, Manado
      23. Agency for Building, Facilities, and Regional Management of Southeast Sulawesi Region, Kendari
      24. Agency for Building, Facilities, and Regional Management of Central Sulawesi Region, Palu
      25. Agency for Building, Facilities, and Regional Management of South Sulawesi Region, Makassar
      26. Agency for Building, Facilities, and Regional Management of Papua Region, Jayapura
      27. Agency for Building, Facilities, and Regional Management of West Papua Region, Manokwari
    2. Type "B" Centers-level
      1. Agency for Building, Facilities, and Regional Management of Bengkulu Region, Bengkulu
      2. Agency for Building, Facilities, and Regional Management of Bangka Belitung Region, Pangkal Pinang
      3. Agency for Building, Facilities, and Regional Management of Jambi Region, Jambi
      4. Agency for Building, Facilities, and Regional Management of Gorontalo Region, Gorontalo
      5. Agency for Building, Facilities, and Regional Management of West Sulawesi Region, Mamuju
      6. Agency for Building, Facilities, and Regional Management of Maluku Region, Ambon
      7. Agency for Building, Facilities, and Regional Management of North Maluku Region, Ternate
  10. Engineering Institutes
    1. Indonesian Engineering Institute for Drinking Water, Bekasi
    2. Indonesian Engineering Institute for Sanitation, Surabaya
    3. Indonesian Engineering Institute for Building Materials and Building Structure, Bandung
    4. Indonesian Engineering Institute for Building Science, Bandung
    5. Indonesian Engineering Institute for Building Management and Environment, Bandung
8. Directorate General of Strategic Facilities (Directorate General IV)
  1. Secretariat of Directorate General of Strategic Facilities
  2. Directorate of Strategic Facilities Implementation System and Strategies
  3. Directorate of Supporting Infrastructures for Education
  4. Directorate of Supporting Infrastructures for Economy, Healthcare, Religions, Sports, and Socio-Culture
  5. Directorate of Internal Compliance
9. Directorate General of Construction Development (Directorate General V)
  1. Secretariat of Directorate General of Construction Development
  2. Directorate of Businesses Affairs and Institutional Affairs for Construction Services
  3. Directorate of Construction Personnel Competency and Productivity
  4. Directorate of Construction Services Procurement
  5. Directorate of Construction Safety and Sustainable Construction
  6. Directorate of Internal Compliance
  7. Construction Services Development Board of Indonesia
    1. Secretariat of Construction Services Development Board
  8. Construction Services Agencies
    1. Construction Services Agency for Region I, Banda Aceh
    2. Construction Services Agency for Region II, Palembang
    3. Construction Services Agency for Region III, Jakarta
    4. Construction Services Agency for Region IV, Surabaya
    5. Construction Services Agency for Region V, Banjarmasin
    6. Construction Services Agency for Region VI, Makassar
    7. Construction Services Agency for Region VII, Jayapura
  9. Construction Services Procurement Agencies
    1. Type "A" Centers-level
      1. Construction Services Procurement Agency for Aceh Region, Banda Aceh
      2. Construction Services Procurement Agency for North Sumatra Region, Medan
      3. Construction Services Procurement Agency for West Sumatra Region, Padang
      4. Construction Services Procurement Agency for South Sumatra Region, Palembang
      5. Construction Services Procurement Agency for Jambi Region, Jambi
      6. Construction Services Procurement Agency for Lampung Region, Bandar Lampung
      7. Construction Services Procurement Agency for Banten Region, Bandung
      8. Construction Services Procurement Agency for DKI Jakarta Region, Jakarta
      9. Construction Services Procurement Agency for West Java Region, Bandung
      10. Construction Services Procurement Agency for D.I Yogyakarta Region, Yogyakarta
      11. Construction Services Procurement Agency for Central Java Region, Semarang
      12. Construction Services Procurement Agency for East Java Region, Surabaya
      13. Construction Services Procurement Agency for Bali Region, Denpasar
      14. Construction Services Procurement Agency for East Nusa Tenggara Region, Kupang
      15. Construction Services Procurement Agency for West Nusa Tenggara Region, Mataram
      16. Construction Services Procurement Agency for West Kalimantan Region, Pontianak
      17. Construction Services Procurement Agency for South Kalimantan Region, Banjarmasin
      18. Construction Services Procurement Agency for Central Kalimantan Region, Palangkaraya
      19. Construction Services Procurement Agency for East Kalimantan Region, Samarinda
      20. Construction Services Procurement Agency for North Kalimantan Region, Tarakan
      21. Construction Services Procurement Agency for North Sulawesi Region, Manado
      22. Construction Services Procurement Agency for Southeast Sulawesi Region, Kendari
      23. Construction Services Procurement Agency for Central Sulawesi Region, Palu
      24. Construction Services Procurement Agency for South Sulawesi Region, Makassar
      25. Construction Services Procurement Agency for Papua Region, Jayapura
      26. Construction Services Procurement Agency for West Papua Region, Manokwari
    2. Type "B" Centers-level
      1. Construction Services Procurement Agency for Riau Region, Pekanbaru
      2. Construction Services Procurement Agency for Riau Islands Region, Batam
      3. Construction Services Procurement Agency for Bengkulu Region, Bengkulu
      4. Construction Services Procurement Agency for Bangka Belitung Region, Pangkal Pinang
      5. Construction Services Procurement Agency for Gorontalo Region, Gorontalo
      6. Construction Services Procurement Agency for West Sulawesi Region, Mamuju
      7. Construction Services Procurement Agency for Maluku Region, Ambon
      8. Construction Services Procurement Agency for North Maluku Region, Ternate
10. Directorate General of Public Works Infrastructure Financing (Directorate General VI)
  1. Secretary of Directorate General of Public Works Infrastructure Financing
  2. Directorate of Financing Implementation System Development and Strategies
  3. Directorate of Water Resources Infrastructure Financing Implementation
  4. Directorate of Highways Infrastructure Financing Implementation
  5. Directorate of Settlement Infrastructure Financing Implementation
11. Inspectorate General
  1. Secretariat of Inspectorate General
  2. Inspectorate I
  3. Inspectorate II
  4. Inspectorate III
  5. Inspectorate IV
  6. Inspectorate V
  7. Inspectorate VI
12. Regional Infrastructure Development Agency
  1. Secretariat of Regional Infrastructure Development Agency
  2. Center for National Infrastructure Development
  3. Center for Public Works Infrastructure Development for Region I (Sumatera and Kalimantan Islands)
  4. Center for Public Works Infrastructure Development for Region II (Java, Bali, and Nusa Tenggara Islands)
  5. Center for Public Works Infrastructure Development for Region III (Sulawesi, Maluku, and Papua Islands)
13. Human Resources Development Agency
  1. Secretariat of Human Resources Development Agency
  2. Center for Talent Development
  3. Competency Development Center for Water Resources, Settlements, and Strategic Facilities
  4. Competency Development Center for Road, Infrastructure Financing, and Regional Infrastructure Development
  5. Center for Management Competency Development
  6. Public Works Polytechnic
  7. Public Works Competency Development Institute for Region I, Medan
  8. Public Works Competency Development Institute for Region II, Palembang
  9. Public Works Competency Development Institute for Region III, Jakarta
  10. Public Works Competency Development Institute for Region IV, Bandung
  11. Public Works Competency Development Institute for Region V, Yogyakarta
  12. Public Works Competency Development Institute for Region VI, Surabaya
  13. Public Works Competency Development Institute for Region VII, Banjarmasin
  14. Public Works Competency Development Institute for Region VIII, Makassar
  15. Public Works Competency Development Institute for Region IX, Jayapura
  16. Competency Assessment Institute, Jakarta
