= 2025 Pekalongan flood and landslide =

2025 flood and landslide in Indonesia

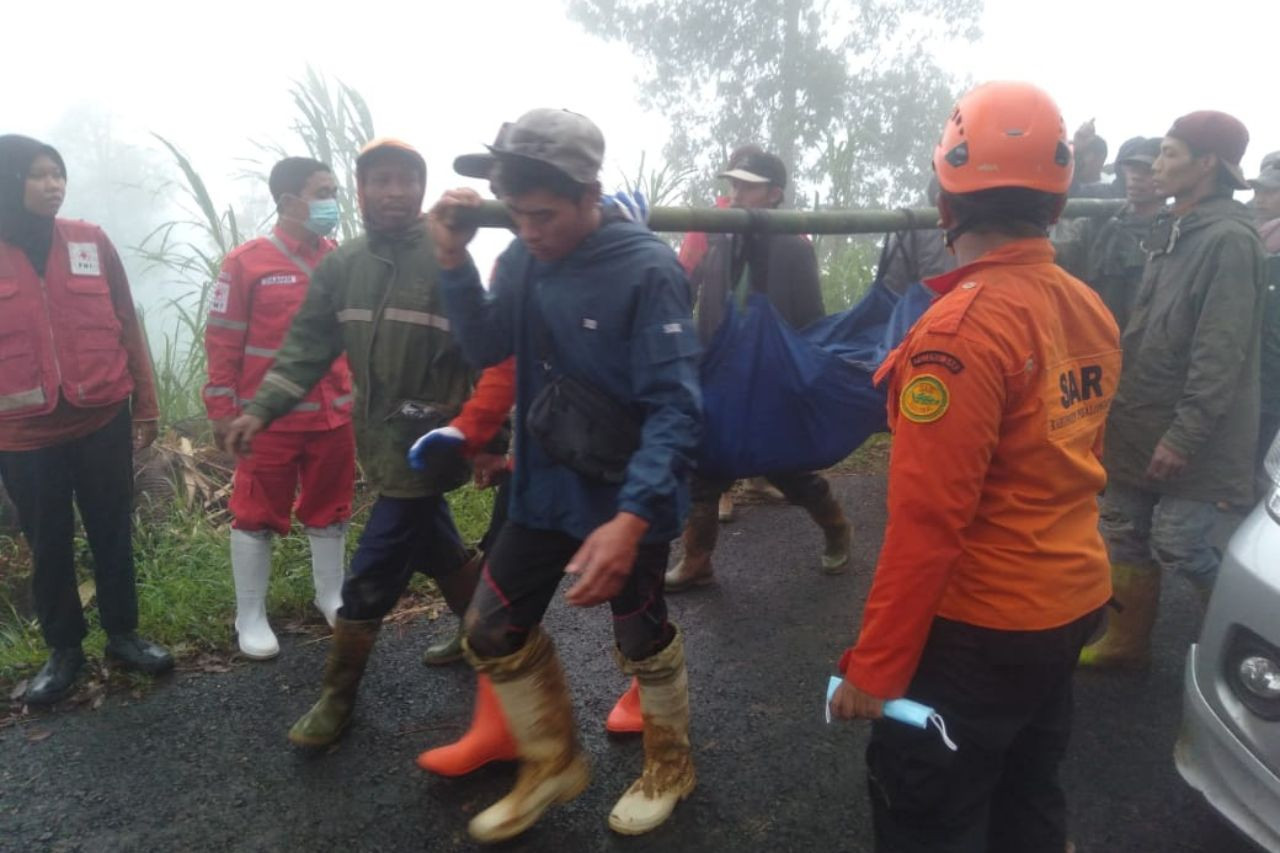
- A SAR team evacuating a landslide victim
- Date: 20 January 2025
- Time: ~17:30 WIB
- Location: Pekalongan, Central Java, Indonesia; 7°8′S 109°44′E
- Cause: Heavy rains
- Deaths: 25
- Injuries: 13
- Missing: 2

On the evening of 20 January 2025, heavy rains caused flooding and landslides in Pekalongan Regency, Central Java, Indonesia. One of the landslides struck two occupied buildings, while a number of locals fishing were swept away by a flash flood. In total, at least 25 people were killed, with a further two missing and more injured.

== Incident ==
Heavy rains in January 2025 caused landslides in Pekalongan Regency. Prior to the disaster itself, another landslide on 19 January had caused the closure of a main road within the regency, although no victims were reported. At the site of the disaster, at Petungkriyana district in the hilly southern part of the regency, heavy rains began in the afternoon.

One of the landslides occurred at approximately 17:30 local time at Kasimpar village in Petungkriyana, destroying a cafe, two houses, and several cars. At the time, one of the houses were empty, while gatherings were ongoing in the other house and the cafe. According to local rescue teams, there were 25 to 30 people occupying the cafe alone at the time of the landslide. Around the same time, a group of eleven locals fishing at a riverbank were swept away by a flash flood also caused by the downpour.

Further landslides occurred throughout the night, which also blocked access roads to the impacted areas. The flooding also swept away two bridges in the area.

== Response ==
Evacuation and search and rescue efforts were hindered by the damaged access roads to Kasimpar, along with continuing heavy rains. 600 personnel accompanied by search and rescue dogs were deployed. By 22 January, 20 of the fatalities have been found with a further 8 missing. Another 13 victims were injured. Two more bodies were found on 24 January, raising the death toll to 25.

The regency government declared a 14-day disaster emergency on 21 January. Eleven districts in Pekalongan were affected by the landslides, and the Ministry of Social Affairs released emergency aid worth Rp 1.4 billion (US$90,000) on 21 January.
