= Opi Bachtiar =

Indonesian actor (1982–2025)

Taufik Ashari Bachtiar (9 May 1982 – 10 August 2025), known as Opi Bachtiar, was an Indonesian actor.

== Life and career ==
Bachtiar was born on 9 May 1982 in Jakarta, He made his acting debut in 2005 with the film Me vs High Heels. He was also involved in fashion designing.

Bachtiar died at the Premier Hospital in Bintaro, on 10 August 2025, at the age of 43.
