= Clara Sumarwati =

Indonesian mountaineer (1967–2025)

Clara Sumarwati (July 6, 1967 – October 2, 2025) was an Indonesian mountaineer.

== Life and career ==
In 1994, Sumarwati and five people from the PPGAD (Army Mountain Climbers Association) team set off but were only able to reach an altitude of 7,000 meters due to the extremely difficult and dangerous terrain conditions on the southern path of the Himalayas (commonly called South Col).

On September 26, 1996, Sumarwati became the first Southeast Asian to reach the summit of Everest.

Sumarwati died from complications of diabetes in Mantrijeron, Yogyakarta, on October 2, 2025, at the age of 58.
