= Nina Carolina =

Indonesian comedian and host (1987–2025)

- Born: Nina Carolina; 12 March 1987; Jakarta, Indonesia
- Died: 15 August 2025 (aged 38); Jakarta, Indonesia
- Burial place: Kujaran Public Cemetery
- Other name: Mpok Alpa
- Occupations: Comedian; singer; host
- Years active: 2018–2025
- Spouse: Aji Darmaji (m. 2018)
- Children: 4

Nina Carolina (12 March 1987 – 15 August 2025), commonly known as Mpok Alpa, was an Indonesian comedian and host. She was initially known through her video of wanting to be invited to Alfamart in Betawi language which went viral on social media.

== Career ==
Nina was known as a dangdut singer. She had been performing dangdut songs on stage since 6th grade.

She regularly sang at celebrations every Saturday and Sunday. She also shared the stage with dangdut singer Elvy Sukaesih. Nina admitted that she has fans called the Carolina Fans Club (CFC), where she sang dangdut songs from stage to stage, which is a profession she pursued, before finally becoming known as a comedian.

== Death ==
On 15 August 2025, Carolina died at Dharmais Hospital, after three years of suffering from breast cancer, which she kept private. She was 38. She was buried in Ciganjur, South Jakarta.

== Discography ==
=== Singles ===
- Ke Emol (2018)
- Mati Rasa (2020)

== Filmography ==
=== Television series ===
Year	Title	Role	Notes
2018	Cinta yang Hilang	Alpa	

=== Television shows ===
- Opera Van Java (Trans 7)
- Pagi-Pagi Pasti Happy (Trans TV)
- Buka Ae (NET TV)
- Jangan Baper (MNCTV)
- Oh Gitu (Trans TV)
- Sahur Segerr (Trans 7)
- Ini Ramadan (NET TV)
- Cemplang Cemplung (Trans 7; audio only)
- In The Kost (NET TV)
- Sobat Misqueen (Trans 7)
- Sobat Mistis (Trans 7)
- Ramadan In The Kost (NET TV)
- Uang Kaget Lagi (MNCTV)
- Anak Sekolah (Trans 7)
- Sahurnya Pesbukers (ANTV)
- eXpresi (NET TV)
- Ketawa Itu Berkah (Trans TV)
- For Your Pagi (Trans 7)
- House of Mama Gigi (SCTV)
- Arisan (Trans 7)
- Ramadan Itu Berkah (Trans TV)
- Bikin Laper (Trans TV)
- Makan Bareng Artis (RCTI)
- Pesbukers Ramadan (ANTV)
- COD (Comedy on Delivery) (Trans 7)
