= Serge Atlaoui =

French national sentenced to death in Indonesia for drug trafficking

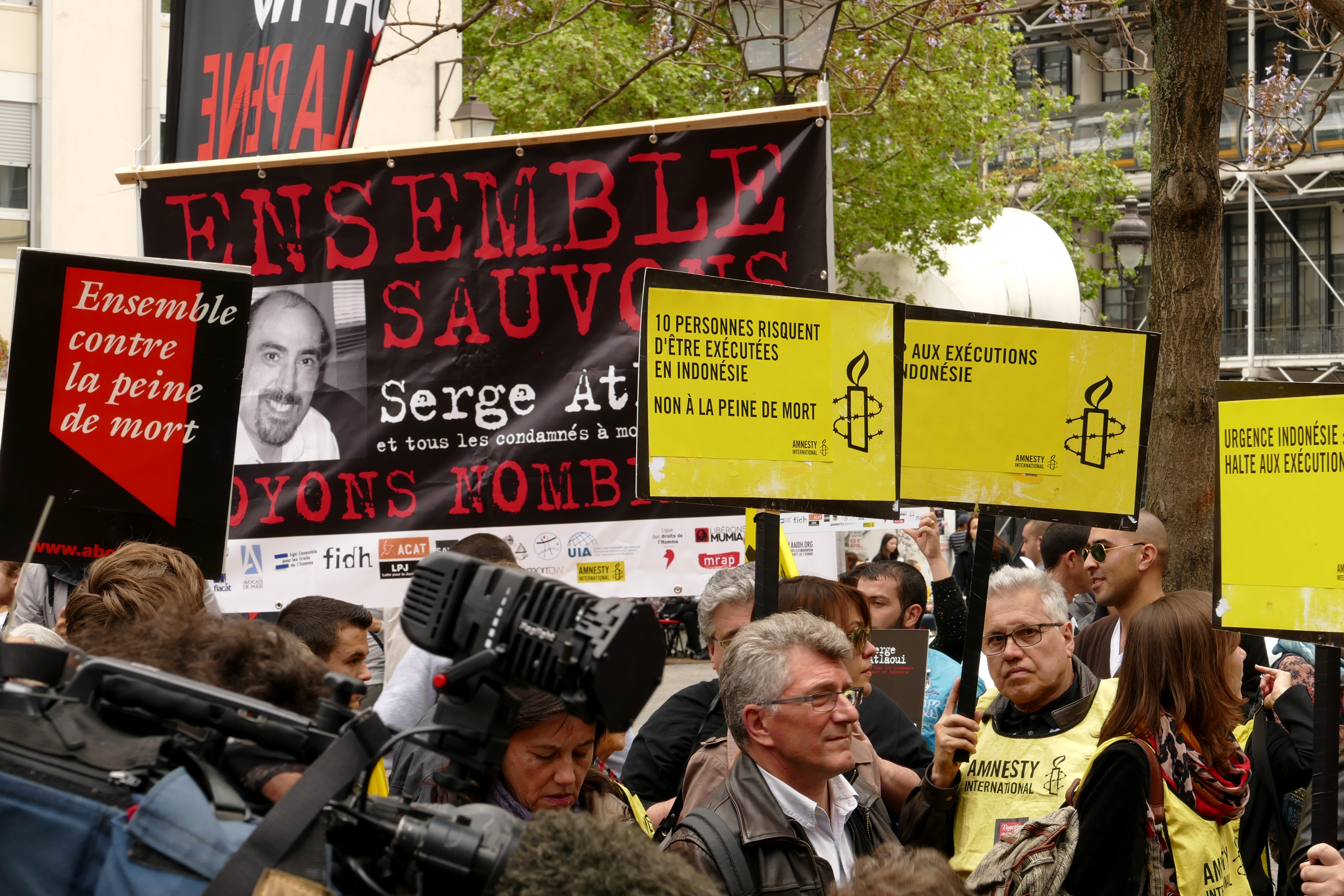
Protesters on Paris streets advocating against Atlaoui's death penalty, 2015

Serge Areski Atlaoui (born 16 December 1963) is a French national who was sentenced to death in Indonesia for drug trafficking. He was arrested on 11 November 2005 during a police raid in Tangerang, near Jakarta. Since 2015, France repeatedly intervened to prevent his execution.

On 4 February 2025, Atlaoui was repatriated to France, and was released from prison on 18 July 2025.

== Early life ==
Serge Atlaoui is of Algerian descent.

He became a welder in Metz and initially worked independently in the Netherlands.

== Arrest and trial ==
In 2005, Atlaoui was working in an industrial facility in Tangerang, Indonesia. He stated that he had been hired to install machines for €4,000 per week, allegedly for acrylic production.

On 11 November 2005, police raided the site and arrested 17 people, including Atlaoui. The facility was found to be producing ecstasy tablets. He claimed he only realized the facility's true nature moments before his arrest.

During the initial trial, Atlaoui was sentenced to life imprisonment for drug trafficking. In 2007, the Indonesian Supreme Court overturned the life sentence and imposed the death penalty.

== Legal appeals and diplomatic efforts ==
Atlaoui’s request for clemency was denied by President Joko Widodo in late 2014. He subsequently filed for a case review with the Indonesian Supreme Court, which rejected the petition the following April. The court upheld his conviction, citing his involvement in the distribution and brokering of drug transactions, including evidence of pure heroin.

His legal team submitted several additional appeals, including to the Constitutional Court and Jakarta Administrative Court. All were ultimately rejected. However, his name was removed from the list of inmates scheduled for execution in April 2015 to allow review of new information.

== Repatriation and release ==
In November and December 2024, France submitted formal requests for Atlaoui's transfer. His transfer to France was approved, and he returned on 4 February 2025.

On 12 February 2025, the Pontoise Criminal Court commuted his sentence to 30 years' imprisonment. He was granted conditional release by the Melun Sentence Enforcement Court on 15 July and left prison on 18 July 2025.

== Advocacy and public reaction ==
An association called "100% Serge Atlaoui" was formed in France to support him. Protests and rallies were held in Paris and Metz, supported by organizations such as Ensemble contre la peine de mort.

Prominent figures including Anggun and French officials spoke out in his defense. President François Hollande, Prime Minister Manuel Valls, and Foreign Minister Laurent Fabius made public appeals to Indonesia to halt the execution. Ban Ki-moon, then Secretary-General of the United Nations, also urged clemency.

== Personal life ==
Atlaoui married his wife Sabine while in prison in 2007. At the time of his arrest in 2005, he had three children; a fourth was born during his incarceration.

== See also ==
- Bali Nine
- Michaël Blanc
- Capital punishment in Indonesia
