= Lewotobi =

Stratovolcano in Flores, Indonesia

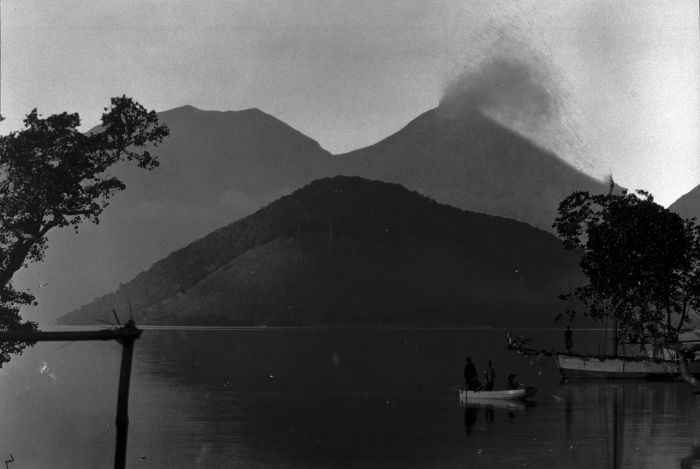
- Mount Lewotobi, photographed in c. 1915

Highest point
- Elevation: 1,703 m (5,587 ft) (Lewotobi Perempuan); 1,584 m (5,197 ft) (Lewotobi Laki-laki)
- Prominence: 1,398 m (4,587 ft)
- Listing: Ribu
- Coordinates: 8°33′6″S 122°46′50″E

Geography
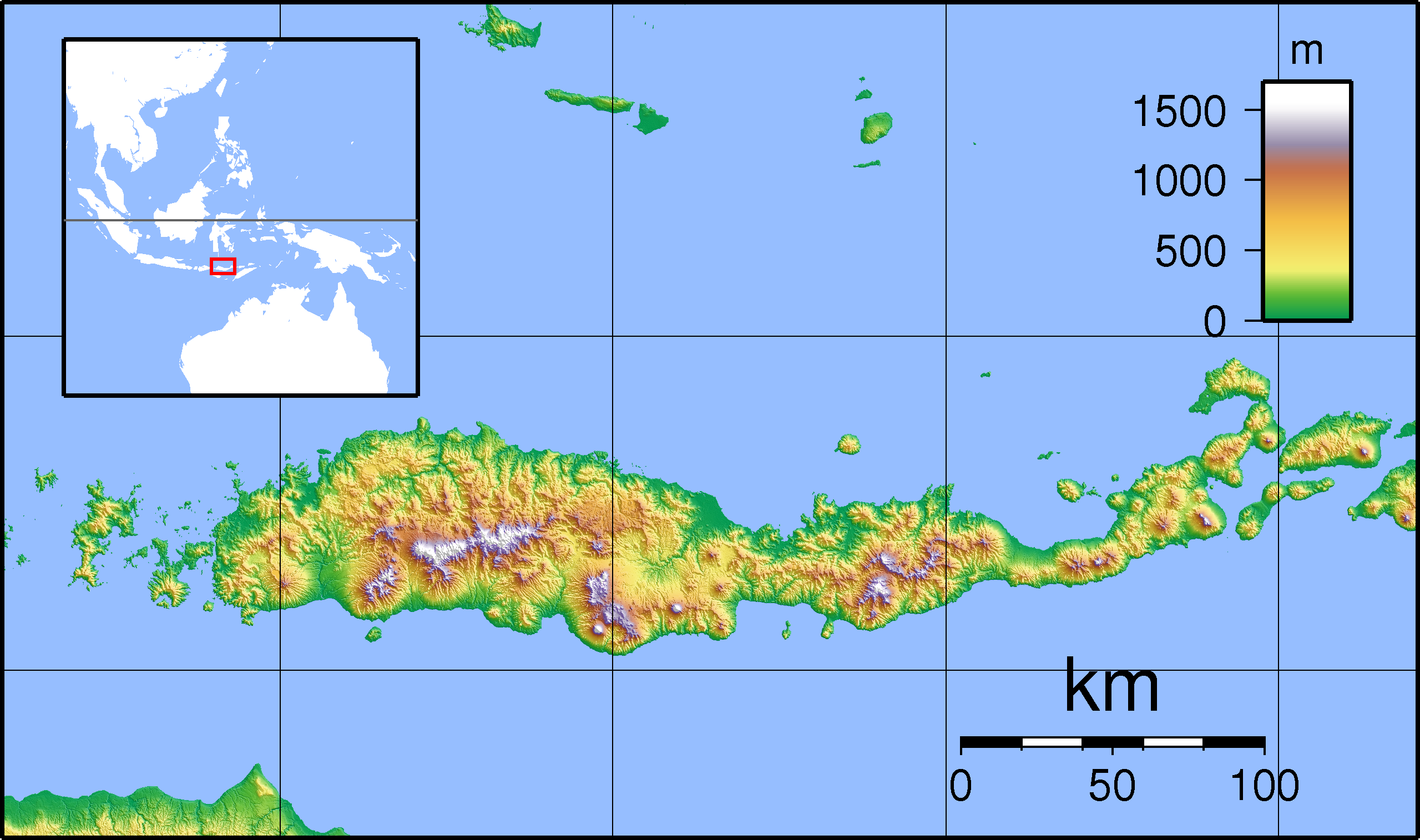
- Location within Flores
- Location: Flores Island, Indonesia

Geology
- Mountain type: Stratovolcanoes
- Volcanic arc: Sunda Arc
- Last eruption: 28 August 2026

Lewotobi is a twin volcano located in the southeastern part of the island of Flores, Indonesia. It has two peaks: the Lewotobi Laki-laki (Male Lewotobi) and Lewotobi Perempuan (Female Lewotobi) stratovolcanoes and a prominent flank cone, Lewotobi Iliwokar, lies on the eastern flank of Lewotobi Perempuan. The more active Lewotobi Laki-laki is about 2.1 km (1.3 mi) northwest of the taller Lewotobi Perempuan.

Older forms of its name include Lobetabi, Lovotivo and Loby Toby.

== Description ==
The names Lewotobi Laki-laki and Lewotobi Perempuan reflect local traditions, with the volcanoes regarded as a symbolic pair, often described as "husband and wife." Older names for the complex include Lobetabi, Lovotivo, and Loby Toby. Lewotobi's twin peaks are classic stratovolcanoes, formed by successive layers of lava, ash, and volcanic debris. The volcanoes are part of the Lesser Sunda Islands volcanic arc, which is shaped by the subduction of the Indo-Australian Plate beneath the Eurasian Plate. The region is seismically active, with frequent tectonic and volcanic earthquakes. The craters of Lewotobi Laki-laki and Lewotobi Perempuan are 400 metres (1,300 ft) and 700 metres (2,300 ft) wide respectively, and their eruptive material is primarily andesite.

== Eruptions ==
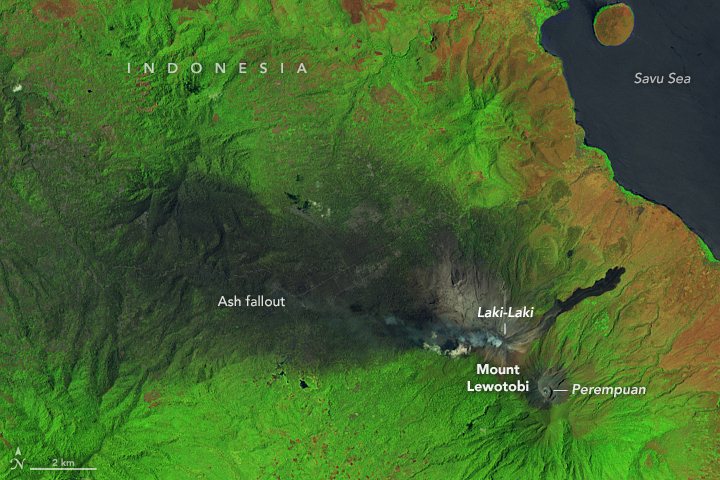
Satellite picture of Mount Lewotobi Laki-Laki eruption on 5 November 2024.

An eruption has been ongoing since the 23 December 2023 in Lewotobi Laki-laki, displacing up to 6,500 people as of January 2024.

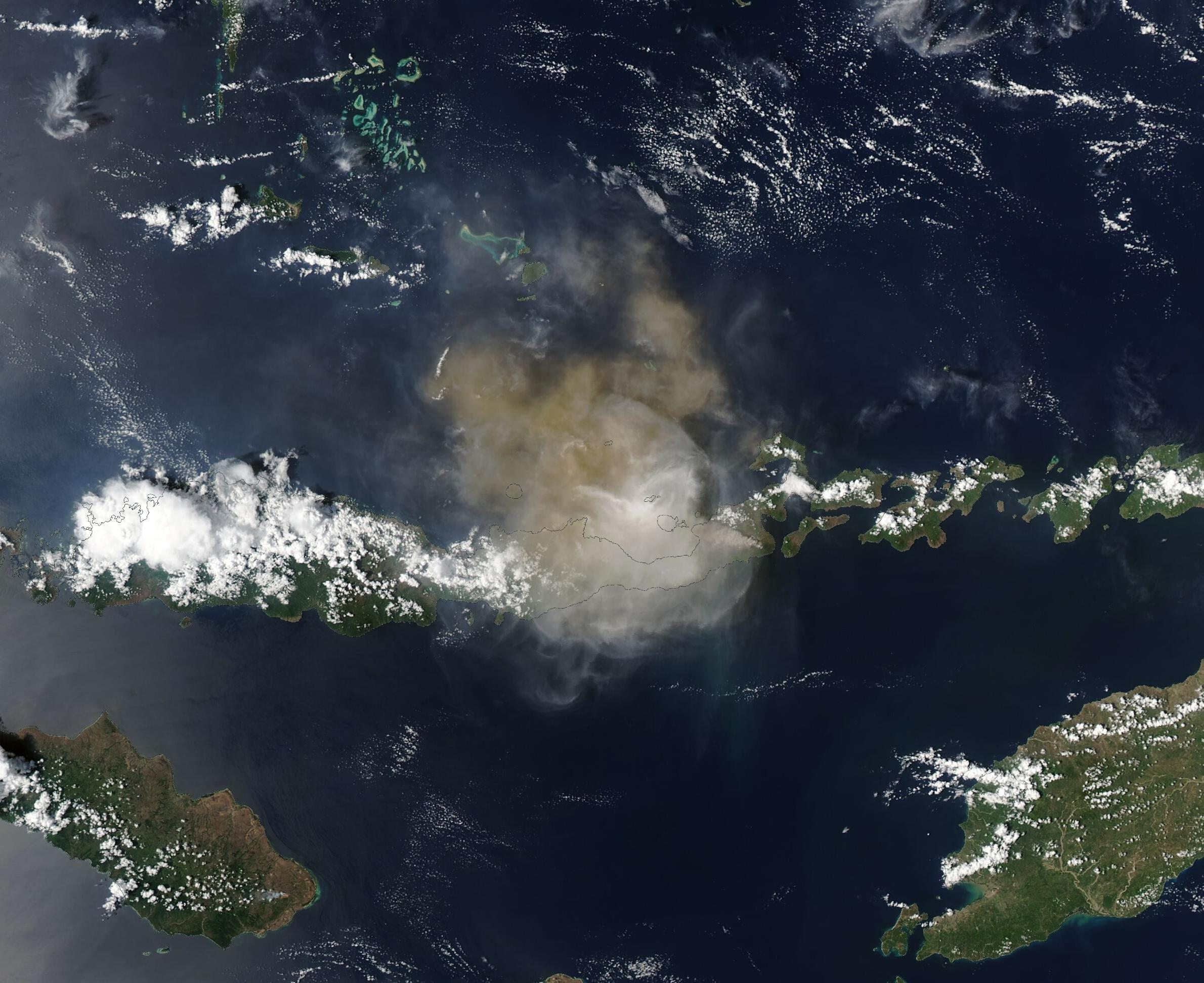
NASA’s Aqua satellite acquired a true-color image of the November 8, 2024 eruption of Mt. Lewotobi on Flores, Indonesia.

On 4 November 2024, the volcano spewed molten debris at several villages some 4 km (2.5 mi) away, destroying homes and killing nine people. The Centre of Volcanology and Geological Hazard Mitigation recommended that a 7 km (4.3 mi) radius around the volcano be evacuated. Seven villages were affected by the eruption. A larger eruption occurred on 7 November. On 8 November, the volcano erupted several times, at one time bearing an ash plume with a height reaching 10 km (6.2 mi). On 9 November, it erupted again, and the authorities scrambled to evacuate approximately 16,000 people from nearby villages. The eruption caused flight disruptions in Bali and the cancellation of a jazz festival in Labuan Bajo.

On 21 March 2025, Lewotobi Laki-laki erupted, sending ash clouds over 8 km (5.0 mi) high. Authorities raised the alert to the highest level, and Jetstar canceled some flights to Bali. The eruption followed smaller ones since 13 March. One person was injured during the evacuations, although the details reported were unclear. Bali airport remained open, but seven international flights were canceled. The geological agency warned of lava floods and continued activity.

Lewotobi Laki-laki erupted on 18 May, prompting authorities to raise Indonesia's highest volcanic alert level, and again on 17 June, sending ash clouds 11 km (6.8 mi) high, prompting authorities to raise Indonesia's highest volcanic alert level again, with a plume visible from a distance of 90 km (56 mi) to 150 km (93 mi). Multiple flights were cancelled due to the amount volcanic ash released into the atmosphere.

Two major eruptions occurred on 7 July, ejecting debris as far as 8 km (5.0 mi) away and producing pyroclastic flows that reached 5 km (3.1 mi) from the crater and an ash cloud 13 km (8.1 mi) high. At least 24 flights were cancelled in Bali. One person was injured after being hit by a motorcycle during evacuations, and another person was hospitalized due to shortage of breath. Further eruptions occurred on 8 July and 1 August. An eruption happened again on 2 August sending volcanic material over 20 km (12 mi) into the air, no casualties were reported. Tremors from the eruption have been recorded on seismic monitors, with the eruption being one of Indonesia's biggest since Mount Merapi's eruption in 2010. Major eruptions occurred on 14 and 15 October.

On 18 August 2026, Lewotobi Laki Laki erupted again.

== See also ==
- List of volcanoes in Indonesia

== Bibliography ==
- "Lewotobi". Global Volcanism Program. Smithsonian Institution.
