= Andi Sumangerukka =

Indonesian politician (born 1963)

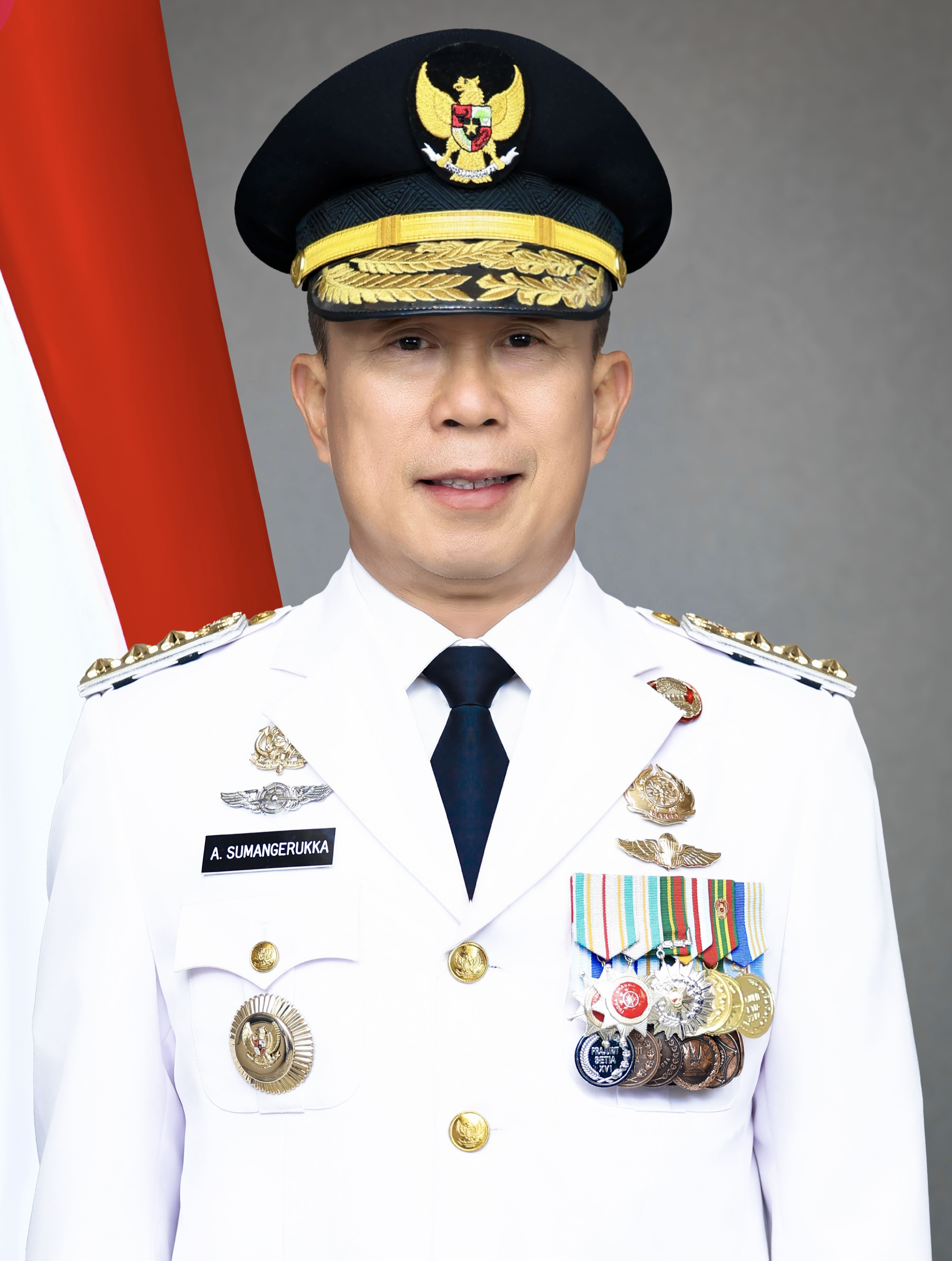

Governor of Southeast Sulawesi
- Incumbent
- Assumed office 20 February 2025
- President: Prabowo Subianto
- Preceded by: Ali Mazi; Andap Budhi Revianto (acting)

Commander of Kodam XIV/Hasanuddin
- In office 9 January 2020 – 1 April 2021

Personal details
- Born: March 11, 1963 (age 63) Makassar, Indonesia
- Party: Gerindra (2025–present)
- Other political affiliations: PPP (until 2025); KIM Plus (2024–present)
- Spouse: Arinta Anila Apsari
- Education: Indonesian Military Academy (1987)

Military service
- Allegiance: Indonesia
- Branch/service: Indonesian Army
- Years of service: 1987–2021
- Rank: Major General
- Unit: Air Defense Artillery

Andi Sumangerukka is the current Governor of Southeast Sulawesi, inaugurated by Indonesian President Prabowo Subianto on 20 February 2025 at the State Palace, Jakarta. Previously he was appointed as Commander of Kodam XIV/Hasanuddin.

== Politics ==
In the 2024 Southeast Sulawesi gubernatorial election, Sumangerukka officially became a gubernatorial candidate with Hugua as a candidate for deputy governor of Southeast Sulawesi supported by 4 political parties, namely PPP, Gerindra, PAN, and Hanura.
