= Dody Hanggodo =

Indonesian businessman and politician

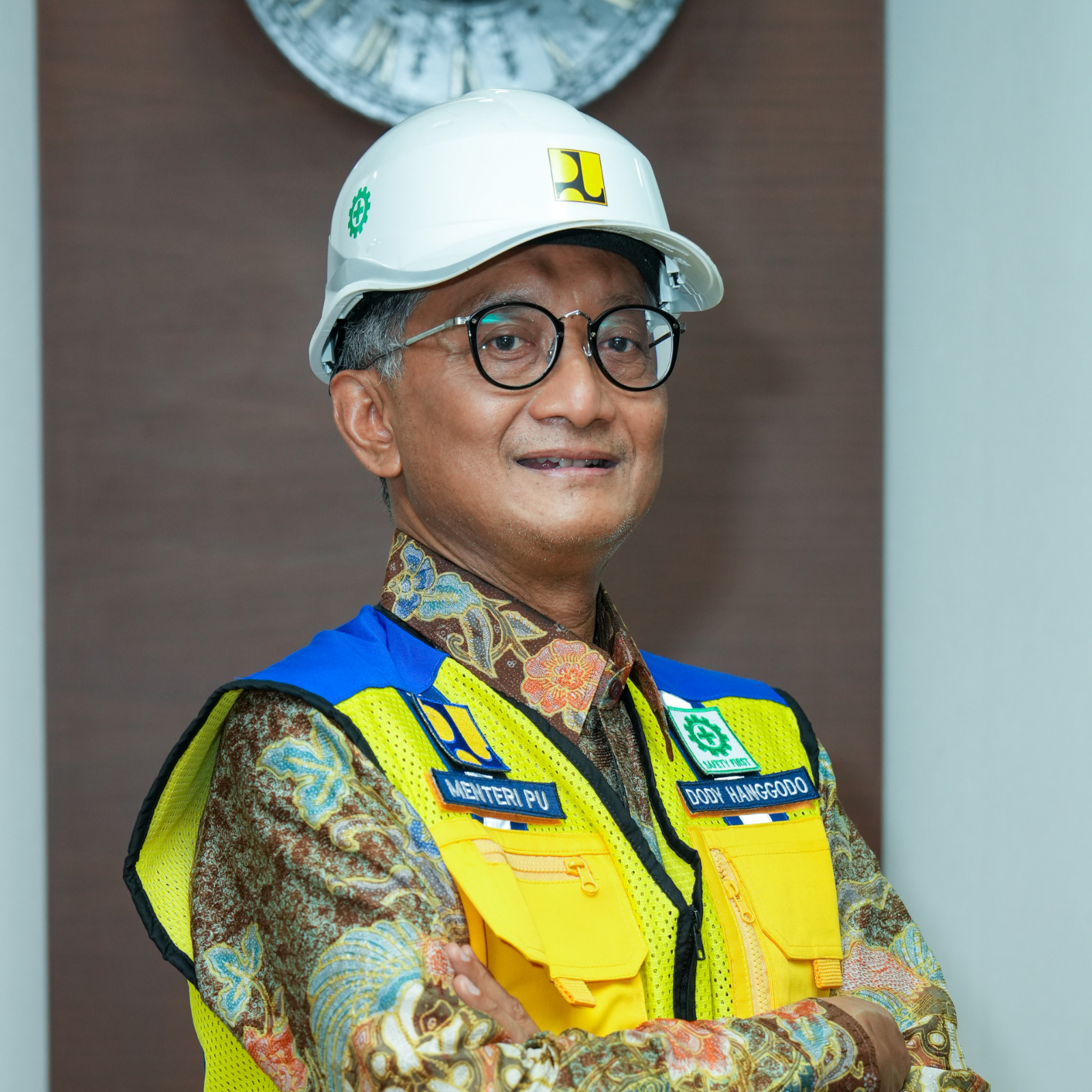

Minister of Public Works
- Incumbent
- Assumed office 21 October 2024
- President: Prabowo Subianto
- Deputy: Diana Kusumastuti
- Preceded by: Basuki Hadimuljono (as Minister of Public Works and Public Housing)

Personal details
- Born: 7 February 1966 (age 60) Mojokerto, East Java
- Party: Demokrat
- Spouse: Irma Hermawati
- Children: 2
- Education: Bandung Institute of Technology (Ir.); Tulsa University (M.PE.)
- Occupation: Businessman; Politician

Dody Hanggodo (born 7 February 1966) is an Indonesian businessman and politician serving as minister of public works since 2024.

He was appointed and sworn into the Red and White Cabinet (Kabinet Merah Putih) by President Prabowo Subianto.

== Program as Minister of Public Works ==
Dody Hanggodo has led infrastructure initiatives that are integral to national development on three fronts: regional connectivity, food security, and water security. He brings strategic mission of PU608, which is derived from and refined the government's Trisula Pembangunan, a three-pillar economic development framework that consists of the eradication of extreme poverty, the development of a high-quality human resource base, and economic growth of 8 percent.

The figures "608" encode three guiding targets in order: an Incremental Capital Output Ratio (ICOR) below 6, extreme poverty reduced to 0 percent, and economic growth of 8 percent, all of which are translated for the Ministry of Public Works (Pekerjaan Umum, abbreviated PU). The sub-6 target is a direct test of whether infrastructure is sharpening investment efficiency or merely absorbing capital, as the ICOR measures the amount of capital required for each additional unit of output. PU608 fuses these objectives into a single, quantifiable doctrine of equitable development, presenting public works not as expenditure but as the lever that converts capital into growth.

In accordance with Presidential Instruction No. 2 of 2025, the ministry has implemented measures to accelerate the construction, upgrading, rehabilitation, operation, and maintenance of irrigation networks in the water sector. The irrigation backbone is regarded as the hydraulic prerequisite for national food self-sufficiency in this directive.
