= 2022 in Indonesia =

- Centuries: 19th; 20th; 21st
- Decades: 2000s; 2010s; 2020s
- See also: History of Indonesia; Timeline of Indonesian history; List of years in Indonesia

2022 (MMXXII) was a common year starting on Saturday of the Gregorian calendar, the 2022nd year of the Common Era (CE) and Anno Domini (AD) designations, the 22nd year of the 3rd millennium and the 21st century, and the 3rd year of the 2020s decade.

The year was defined by the Russian invasion of Ukraine in late February, which greatly affected the country's economy and sparked surges in prices of multiple commodities. The invasion also contributed to the cooking oil crisis that swept through the country from April to May and prompted the government to raise the prices of fuel, causing protests from the public. The invasion of Ukraine eventually overshadowed the G20 Bali Summit in November.

Politically, the year was also marked by multiple landmark cases. In January, the government announced that the new Indonesian capital would be named as Nusantara. In February, the government passed the Law on State Capital, acknowledging the current relocation of Indonesia's capital city from Jakarta and establishing Nusantara as the new capital of Indonesia. In April, the government passed the sexual violence bill, hailed by activists as a major progress in Indonesia. In June, President Joko Widodo reshuffled his cabinet for the third time during his second term. A major murder scandal rocked the Indonesian National Police in July, described as one of the worst scandals in the institution. In November, the government recognized the creation of five new provinces in Papua, bringing the total number of Indonesian provinces to 38.

Due to the decrease of active COVID-19 cases, the government began to gradually lift numerous COVID-19 restrictions. In May, the government lifted the mask mandate in Indonesia and in December President Joko Widodo announced the lifting of Community Activities Restrictions Enforcement (PPKM) throughout the country, hinting that the COVID-19 pandemic in Indonesia was coming to an end and starting the transition to the endemic phase.

== Incumbents ==
=== President and Vice President ===
| President | Vice President |
|---|---|
| Joko Widodo | Ma'ruf Amin |

=== Ministers and Coordinating Ministers ===
==== Coordinating Ministers ====
| Photo | Position | Name |
|---|---|---|
| | Coordinating Minister of Political, Legal, and Security Affairs | Mahfud MD |
| | Coordinating Minister of Economic Affairs | Airlangga Hartarto |
| | Coordinating Minister of Maritime Affairs and Investment | Luhut Binsar Pandjaitan |
| | Coordinating Minister of Human Development and Culture | Muhadjir Effendy |

==== Ministers ====
| Photo | Position | Name |
|---|---|---|
| | Minister of State Secretariat | Pratikno |
| | Minister of Home Affairs | Tito Karnavian |
| | Minister of Foreign Affairs | Retno Marsudi |
| | Minister of Defence | Prabowo Subianto |
| | Minister of Law and Human Rights | Yasonna Laoly |
| | Minister of Finance | Sri Mulyani |
| | Minister of Energy and Mineral Resources | Arifin Tasrif |
| | Minister of Industry | Agus Gumiwang Kartasasmita |
| | Minister of Trade | Zulkifli Hasan |
| | Minister of Agriculture | Syahrul Yasin Limpo |
| | Minister of Environment and Forestry | Siti Nurbaya Bakar |
| | Minister of Transportation | Budi Karya Sumadi |
| | Minister of Marine Affairs and Fisheries | Sakti Wahyu Trenggono |
| | Minister of Manpower | Ida Fauziyah |
| | Minister of Public Works and Public Housing | Basuki Hadimuljono |
| | Minister of Health | Budi Gunadi Sadikin |
| | Minister of Education, Culture, Research and Technology | Nadiem Makarim |
| | Minister of Agrarian Affairs and Spatial Planning | Hadi Tjahjanto |
| | Minister of Social Affairs | Tri Rismaharini |
| | Minister of Religious Affairs | Yaqut Cholil Qoumas |
| | Minister of Communication and Information Technology | Johnny G. Plate |
| | Minister of Research and Technology | Bambang Brodjonegoro |
| | Minister of Cooperatives and Small & Medium Enterprises | Teten Masduki |
| | Minister of Women's Empowerment and Child Protection | I Gusti Ayu Bintang Darmawati |
| | Minister of Administrative and Bureaucratic Reform | Abdullah Azwar Anas |
| | Minister of Villages, Development of Disadvantaged Regions and Transmigration | Abdul Halim Iskandar |
| | Minister of National Development Planning | Suharso Monoarfa |
| | Minister of State-Owned Enterprises | Erick Thohir |
| | Minister of Tourism and Creative Economy | Sandiaga Uno |
| | Minister of Youth and Sports | Zainudin Amali |
| | Minister of Investment | Bahlil Lahadalia |

==== Former ministers (before cabinet reshuffle) ====
| Photo | Position | Name |
|---|---|---|
| | Minister of Trade | Muhammad Lutfi |
| | Minister of Agrarian Affairs and Spatial Planning | Sofyan Djalil |

== Events ==
=== January ===
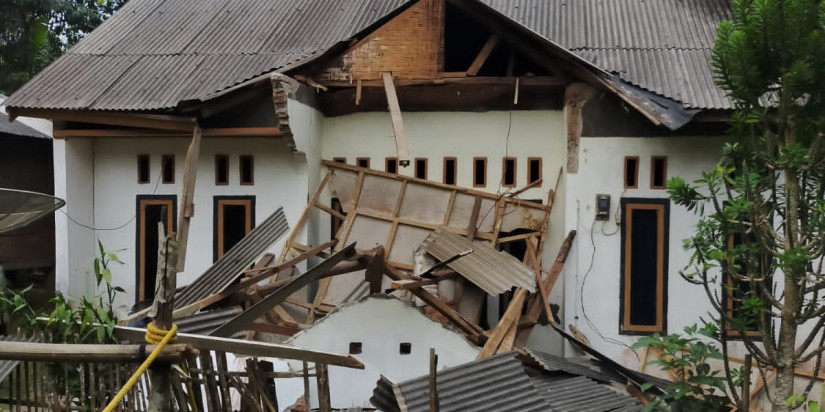
More than 3,000 houses are damaged in Banten following a 6.6 magnitude earthquake in the area

- 4 January – More than 24,000 people evacuated following massive floods on the island of Sumatra.
- 7 January – At least 8 people are killed after floods and landslides sweep Jayapura, Papua.
- 8 January – Designer and sculptor I Nyoman Nuarta unveils the final masterplan for the new Indonesian presidential palace.
- 10 January – At least two people are wounded and more than 50 houses are damaged by a doublet earthquake in Halmahera, North Maluku.
- 11 January
  - Minister of State-Owned Enterprises Erick Thohir reports an alleged corruption from the purchase of several ATR 72-600 by Garuda Indonesia.
  - Gibran Rakabuming Raka and Kaesang Pangarep, sons of the incumbent President Joko Widodo, are reported to the police due to alleged corruption and money laundering.
- 13 January – The Corruption Eradication Commission (KPK) detains Abdul Gafur Mas'ud, Regent of Penajam North Paser Regency, which is one of the planned-site of the new Indonesian capital.
- 14 January – A magnitude 6.6 earthquake strikes Banten, Java, causing damage to more than 3,000 homes. At least 10 people were injured by the quake.
- 17 January – Head of Ministry of National Development Planning of Indonesia Suharso Monoarfa announces the name for the new capital of Indonesia as "Nusantara".
- 19 January – Arteria Dahlan, a member of parliament from the PDIP, came under fire after suggesting that people who uses Sundanese during court matters should be fired. Ridwan Kamil, Governor of West Java Province, where Sundanese people are the majority, demands Arteria Dahlan to apologize to the Sundanese people following his remarks.
- 20 January
  - Government lifts coal export ban on 139 firms.
  - Corruption Eradication Commission (KPK) detains Terbit Rencana Perangin-angin, Regent of Langkat Regency, North Sumatra.
  - MP Arteria Dahlan issues a formal apology to the Sundanese people following his controversial remarks.
- 21 January – Out of control trailer strikes 14 bikes and 6 cars at an intersection in Balikpapan, East Kalimantan, killing 5 people and injuring 15.
- 24 January
  - Dayak figures in East Kalimantan report journalist Edy Mulyadi for hate speech.
  - Indonesian National Commission of Human Rights sends an investigation team to North Sumatra following the discovery of human cages inside the home of Terbit Rencana Perangin-angin.
- 25 January – At least 19 people are killed during clashes between two groups at a nightclub in Sorong, West Papua.
- 26 January – A riot in Central Maluku kills three people in Haruku Island, Central Maluku.
- 31 January – Indonesian police arrests journalist Edy Mulyadi for alleged hate speech incident against Dayak figures.

=== February ===
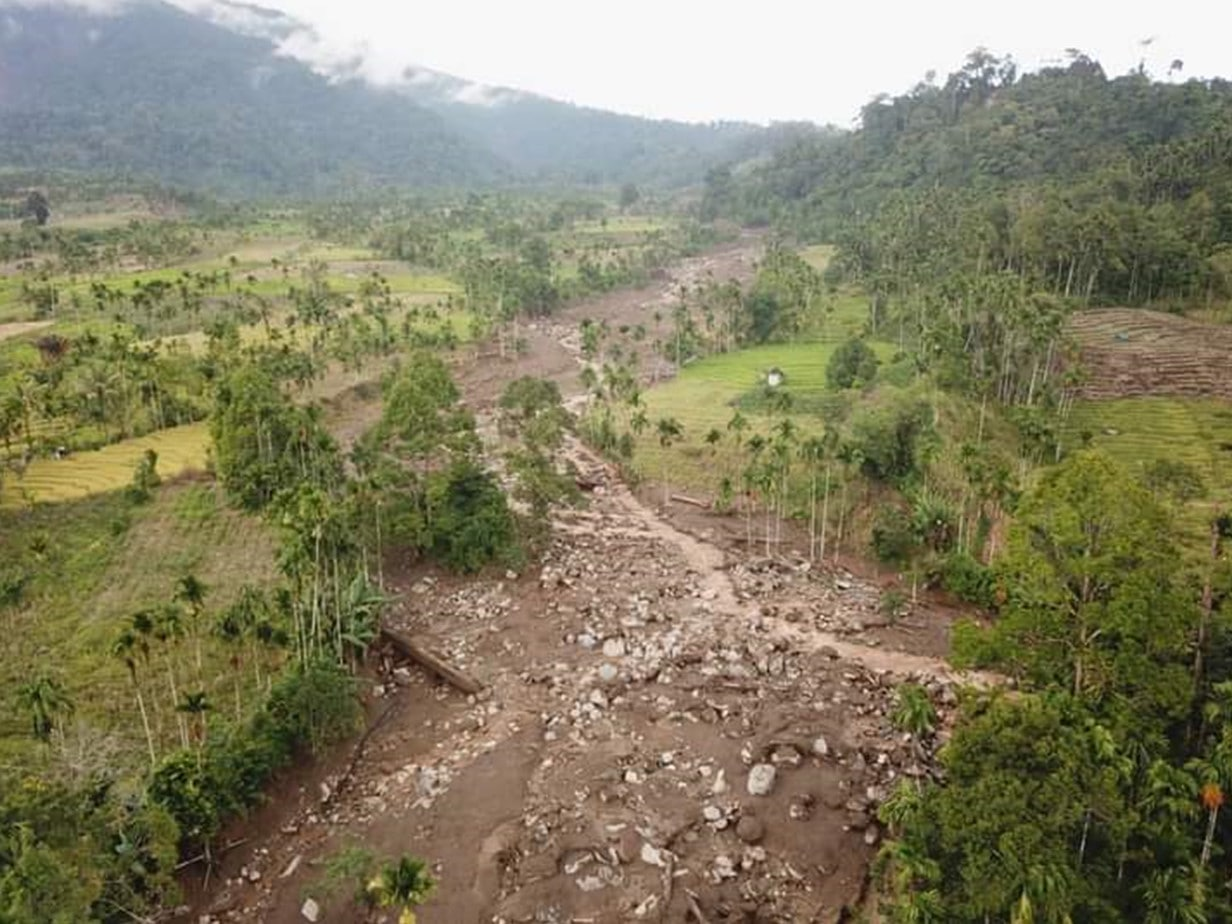
Flash flooding in Malampah after an earthquake in the region

- 2 February – Officials impose temporary lockdown for the People's Representative Council following reports of COVID-19 infections.
- 4 February – Indonesian Medical Association (IDI) announces that Indonesia has entered the third wave of the COVID-19 pandemic.
- 5 February – Bali reopens for direct international flights for the first time in two years.
- 6 February – A tourist bus crash in Bantul kills 13 people.
- 8 February – Incumbent Governor of Central Java, Ganjar Pranowo, is criticized by the public and human rights organizations following police deployment in the village of Wadas.
- 11 February – Minister of Manpower Ida Fauziah decides to limit JHT.
- 14 February – At least 11 people are drowned during a ritual procession on the coast of Jember, East Java.
- 15 February – South Kalimantan officially moves its capital from Banjarmasin to Banjarbaru.
- 16 February – Labor strikes occur in multiple cities following Ministry of Manpower's decision to limit JHT.
- 18 February – Dutch prime minister Mark Rutte issues an apology to Indonesians after a major historical review on war crimes during the Indonesian National Revolution emerges.
- 25 February – At least 19 people are killed and dozens injured after a strong 6.2 magnitude earthquake strikes West Sumatra.
- 27 February – Tourist bus and passenger train collision in East Java's Tulungagung Regency kills 6 people.

=== March ===
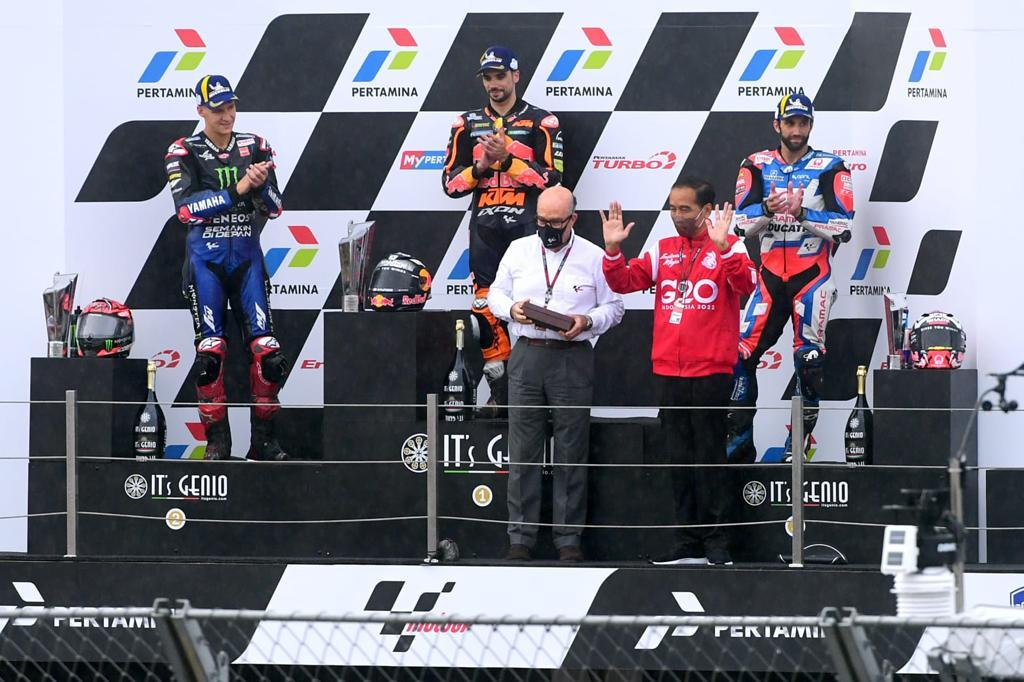
President Joko Widodo attends the Awards Ceremony of the 2022 Mandalika MotoGP

- 1 March – Massive flood sweep Serang, affecting 3,500 people and killing 5.
- 2 March – Armed groups attack workers in Papua, killing 8.
- 3 March – A total of 80 Indonesians and 3 foreigners arrive in Indonesia following massive evacuation from Ukraine.
- 7 March – Multiple prominent political figures challenge the new Indonesian capital bill to Constitutional Court.
- 10 March – Government curbs export amid soaring palm oil prices.
- 14 March – Ministry of Religion changes the Indonesian Ulema Council (MUI)'s halal logo to a Wayang-based logo, prompting criticisms.
- 15 March – Nearly 1,000 homes are submerged following massive floods in Jember, East Java.
- 16 March – Retail price ceiling of cooking oil is revised by officials.
- 18 March – Indonesia holds the first motorcycle Grand Prix since 1997.
- 20 March – Haris Azhar and Fatia Maudiliyanti are declared as suspects by police for defamation against Luhut Binsar Panjaitan regarding a mine in Papua.
- 26 March
  - Indonesian Doctor Association (IDI) revokes the membership of former Health Minister Terawan Agus Putranto, sparking rift between government and IDI.
  - More than 100 houses are damaged due to strong winds in Bangka Regency, Bangka Belitung.
- 31 March – Commander of the Indonesian National Armed Forces Andika Perkasa allows descendants of PKI supporters to join the military. The decision is described as a significantly meaningful move from the traditionally anti-communist Indonesian military.

=== April ===
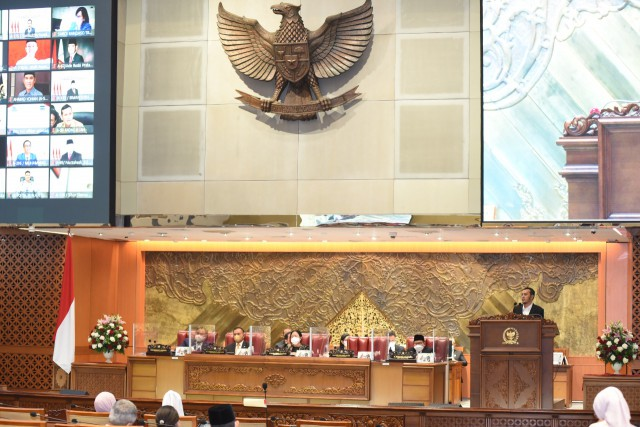
Indonesian People's Representative Council agrees to pass the landmark sexual violence bill on 12 April 2022

- 4 April – Convicted rapist of 13 students, Herry Wirawan, is sentenced to death by Bandung High Court.
- 6 April – Indonesian President Joko Widodo asks his cabinet to stop discussing the possibility of the extension of his presidential term and election postponement.
- 8 April
  - People's Representatives Council passes the draft bill for the creation of 3 new provinces of Ha Anim, Meepago and Lapago in Papua.
  - Papua People's Council criticizes the move, describing it as "un-educational unilateral decision".
- 10 April – President Joko Widodo reiterates that there will be no election postponement, just a day before massive student protest across Indonesia.
- 11 April – Thousands of students hold rallies across Indonesia in response to rising prices of cooking oil and fuel, talks of presidential term extension and election postponement.
- 12 April – People's Representative Council passes landmark anti-sexual violence bill into law.
- 13 April – Truck crash in Papua's Arfak Mountains kills 18 people.
- 18 April – A shallow magnitude 5.2 earthquake damages 101 houses in North Halmahera Regency, North Maluku.
- 19 April
  - Authorities open a corruption case linked to the issuance of permits for palm oil export. At least 4 suspects have been named.
  - Alfamart minimarket collapses onto shoppers in Banjar Regency, killing 5 and injuring 9.
- 20 April – At least 400 homes are submerged due to flooding in Tolitoli, Central Sulawesi.
- 22 April
  - Lawmakers agrees to save Garuda Indonesia from bankruptcy and backs capital top-up.
  - Government bans palm oil export, potentially aggravating the ongoing global food inflation.
- 27 April – Outbreaks of acute hepatitis of unknown etiology are reported across Indonesia. At least 3 children have died from the disease.
- 28 April – Tornado strikes Musi Rawas Regency, damaging 82 homes.

=== May ===
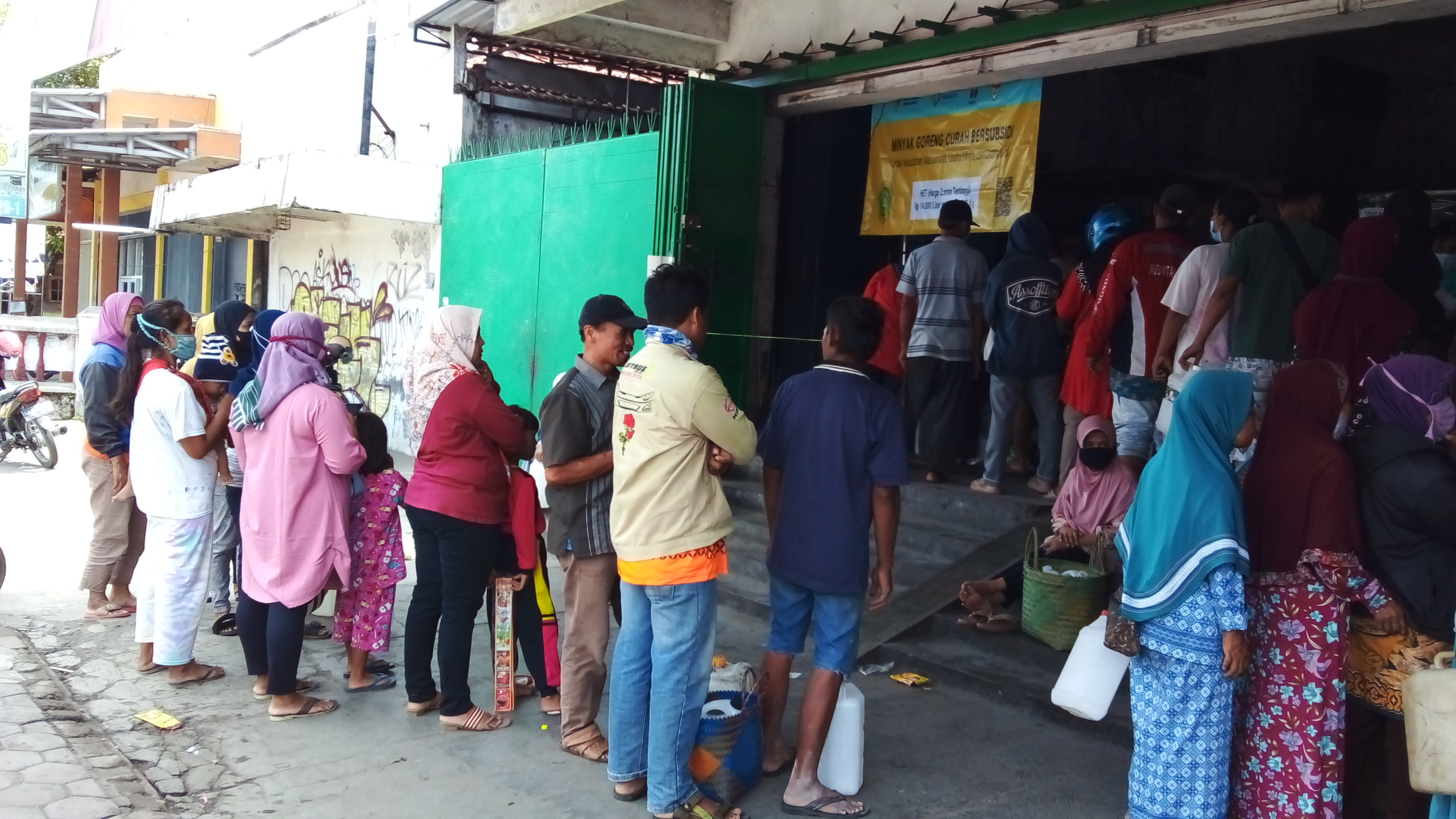
Line of people who are waiting to buy cooking oil at a local store during the cooking oil crisis in Indonesia

- 4 May – Ministry of Health issues advisory on the ongoing hepatitis outbreak.
- 8 May – Waterslide collapses at a local waterpark in Surabaya, injuring 16.
- 9 May – Health Minister Budi Gunadi Sadikin states that a total of 15 suspected cases of acute hepatitis have been found in Indonesia.
- 11 May – Government announces local vaccine production in response to the outbreak of foot-and-mouth disease in the country.
- 12 May
  - Minister states that Indonesia is in transition to the endemic stage of COVID-19 pandemic.
  - Golkar, National Mandate Party (PAN) and United Development Party (PPP) agrees to form the United Indonesia coalition for the upcoming 2024 presidential election.
- 15 May
  - At least 7 people are killed and 9 are injured following multi-vehicles accident in Karawang, West Java.
  - ASEAN mutually accepts each member states COVID-19 vaccine certificates, including Indonesia.
- 16 May – Tourist bus smashes into a billboard in Mojokerto, killing 16.
- 17 May – Government lifts outdoor mask mandate as number of COVID-19 cases drops.
- 23 May – President Joko Widodo to lift ban on palm oil export.
- 28 May – Incumbent governor of Papua Lukas Enembe states that plans to create new provinces in Papua are not viable due to lack of engagement with locals.
- 29 May – At least 19 are missing after MV Ladang Pertiwi 02 sinks in Makassar strait.

=== June ===
- 1 June – Interpol issues yellow notice following the disappearance of Emmeril Kahn Mumtadz, son of incumbent West Java Governor Ridwan Kamil.
- 2 June – Corruption Eradication Commission (KPK) arrests former mayor of Yogyakarta Haryadi Suyuti and other officials in Jakarta.
- 4 June – Indonesia holds its first Formula E Grand Prix in Jakarta.
- 7 June – Police arrests leader of Khilafatul Muslimin, Abdul Qadir, who is accused of seeking to establish an Islamic caliphate in Indonesia.
- 9 June – Indonesian embassy in Bern announces the discovery of the body of Emmeril Kahn Mumtadz in Aare.
- 13 June
  - Thousands attend the funeral of Emmeril Kahn Mumtadz in Bandung, West Java.
  - At least 23 members of Khilafatul Muslimin have been named as criminal suspects.
- 14 June – Indonesia qualifies for 2023 Asian Cup for the first time in 15 years.
- 15 June – President Joko Widodo reshuffles his cabinet for the third time during his second term. Head of National Mandate Party (PAN), Zulkifli Hasan, is appointed as the Minister of Trade, replacing previous minister Muhammad Lutfi. Former General of the Army Hadi Tjahjanto is appointed as Minister of Agrarian and Spatial Planning, replacing previous minister Sofyan Djalil. Two deputy ministers are also inaugurated.
- 19 June – Indonesian Democratic Party and National Awakening Party (PKB) agree to form coalition for the 2024 general election.
- 20 June – Bus collision in South Labuhanbatu Regency kills 7 and injures 15 people.
- 24 June – Protests are held in response to Holywings alleged blasphemy case.
- 27 June – then governor of Jakarta Anies Baswedan revokes the permit of 12 Holywings outlets after suspected blasphemy case.
- 30 June – Government approves the bill for the creation of three new provinces in Papua region, bringing the total number of Indonesian provinces to 37.

=== July ===
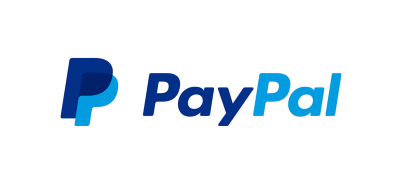
On 30 July, Ministry of Communication blocks multiple services, including PayPal and Steam, due to non-compliance on newly imposed tech rules, sparking backlash from the public

- 5 July
  - At least 15 fishermen went missing after MV Setia Makmur 06 sinks in Arafura Sea.
  - Permit of the charity organization Aksi Cepat Tanggap (ACT) is revoked by the Ministry of Social Affairs due to alleged violations done by the organization.
- 7 July – Hundreds of officers are deployed to arrest a prominent Islamic cleric in an Islamic school in Jombang who is accused of sexually harassing dozens of his students. Scuffles are reported as supporters of the cleric tried to prevent the police from entering the school complex.
- 12 July
  - Police announces that a shootout between police officers in the house of Jakarta's Police Inspector-general on 8 July has killed one police officer, Brigadier Nofriansyah Yosua Hutabarat.
  - Special investigation team is convened following order from President Joko Widodo to investigate the 8 July shooting.
- 15 July
  - Human rights groups suspects foul play in the shootout incident between police officers in Jakarta.
  - Government to stops sending Indonesian migrants to Malaysia following violations of agreements.
- 16 July
  - Indonesian Police issues apology following reports of journalist harassment during the reporting of the July 8 shooting.
  - Armed groups attack a village in Papua's Nduga Regency, killing 10 and wounding 2 others.
- 18 July
  - Relatives of the victim of July 8 shooting officially files a report to the police, accusing a possible intentional murder.
  - Fuel truck crashes into traffic in Cibubur, killing 11.
  - MV Cahaya Arafah, a passenger ferry carrying more than 60 people, sinks in South Halmahera. At least 12 are reported missing.
  - An Indonesian Air Force fighter jet crashes into a forest in Blora, killing one.
- 22 July – Former Sports Minister Roy Suryo is named as suspect by police after posting a controversial meme on his social media.
- 26 July – An "odong-odong" carrying more than 20 people collides with a train in Serang, killing 9.
- 27 July – Police exhumes the grave of 8 July victim Joshua Hutabarat to find possible signs of homicide.
- 28 July – KPK arrests former Regent of Tanah Bumbu Regency Mardani Maming for his alleged involvement in a suspected bribery for copper mine permit in South Kalimantan.
- 30 July – Ministry of Communication and Information blocks multiple services for non-compliance on new tech rules.

=== August ===
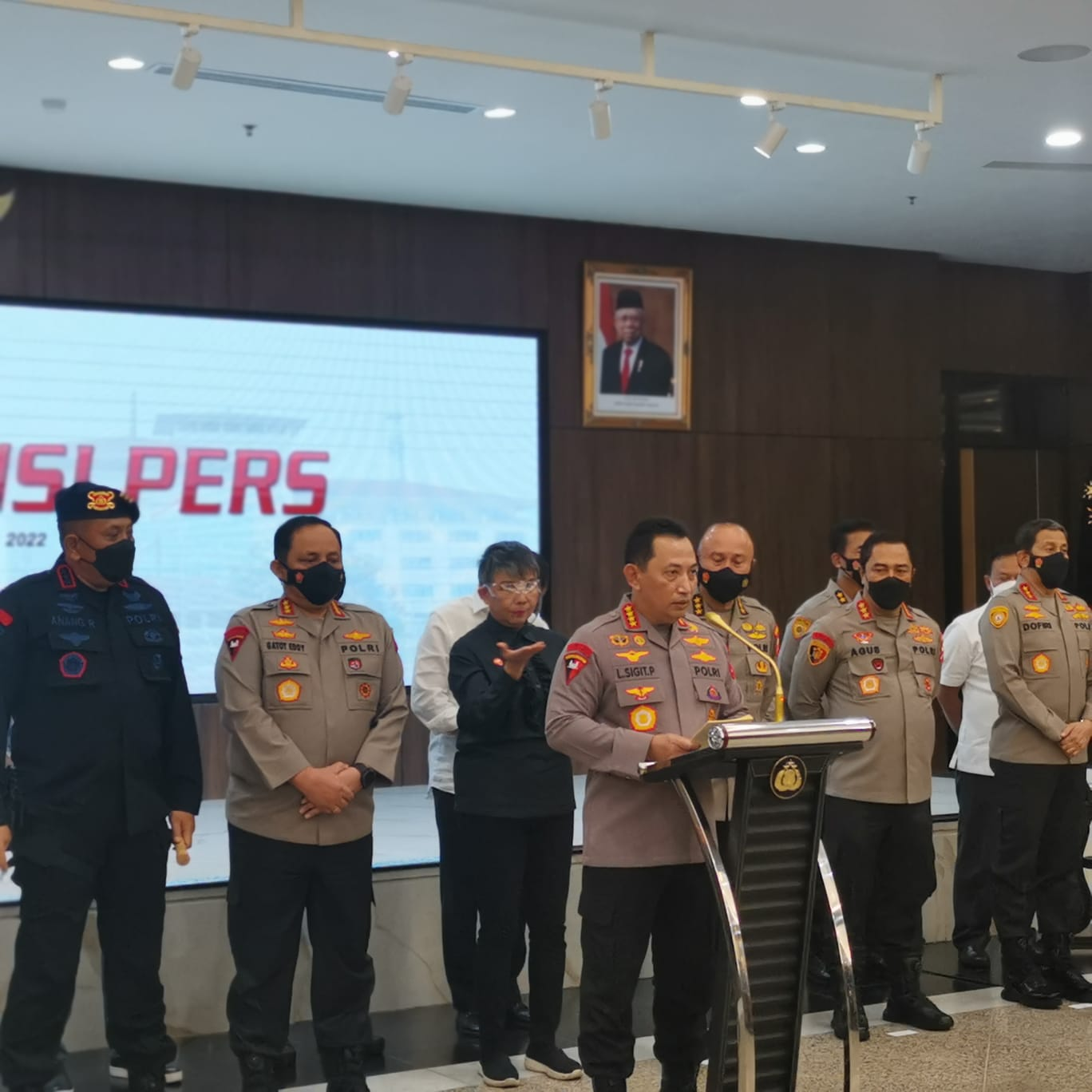
Head of Indonesian National Police Listyo Sigit Prabowo gives updates on the progress of the investigation regarding the murder case of Joshua Hutabarat

- 1 August – Government lifts temporary ban on sending Indonesian migrants to Malaysia.
- 2 August – Officials clears access for multiple services that have been blocked previously following backlash from public.
- 3 August – Police immediately arrests Richard Eliezer after naming him as one of the suspects who are involved in the killing of Joshua Hutabarat.
- 5 August – Police arrests former Sports Minister Roy Suryo for alleged blasphemy.
- 9 August – Inspector General Ferdy Sambo named by police as suspect in murder of Joshua Hutabarat.
- 16 August – During the annual State of the Nation Address, President Joko Widodo issues a presidential decree on the creation of non-judicial committee to investigate past gross human rights violations.
- 18 August
  - Bank Indonesia issues new banknotes design to the public.
  - Wife of Ferdy Sambo, Putri Candrawathi, named as one of the suspects in the murder case of Joshua Hutabarat.
  - Police arrests 5 officers who are suspected of attempting to halt the investigation of Joshua Hutabarat murder case.
- 19 August – Australia sends protest to Indonesia following the early release of convicted 2002 Bali bombings suspect Umar Patek from prison.
- 20 August – Ministry of Health confirms first monkeypox infection in the country.
- 21 August – Government to investigate reports of data breach on communication state-firm Telkomsel.
- 22 August – Commission III of Indonesian People's Representatives Council conducts the first public hearing on the murder case of Joshua Hutabarat.
- 27 August – At least 11 missing after a cargo ship sinks in Makassar Strait.
- 30 August – Parliament ratifies RCEP into law.
- 31 August – Truck plows into group of people in front of a school and slams into a BTS tower in Kranji, Bekasi. The tower later collapses onto motorists on the other side of the road. At least 10 are killed and 20 are injured.

=== September ===
- 2 September – Indonesia to retrieve the Calcutta Stone from India.
- 3 September – Government announces petrol price rise by up to 30%.
- 6 September – Rising fuel prices sparks nationwide protests.
- 7 September
  - President Joko Widodo inaugurates former regent of Banyuwangi Abdullah Azwar Anas as the new Ministry of State Apparatus Utilization and Bureaucratic Reform.
  - An Indonesian Navy G-36 Bonanza T2503 goes missing near the island of Madura, East Java.
- 10–11 September – Foreign hacker identified by their pseudonym Bjorka leaked personal data of several high-ranking Indonesian officials.
- 12 September – Laborers and students holds demonstration against rising fuel prices in Jakarta.
- 14 September
  - Government to form body for data protection following string of hackings by Bjorka.
  - KPK declares incumbent Governor of Papua Lukas Enembe as a suspect in a corruption case.
- 16 September – Regent of East Kolaka Andi Merya is charged with an attempted bribery of roughly 1.5 billion rupiah.
- 17 September – A tornado sweeps over 5 villages in Sukabumi, damaging more than 60 homes.
- 18 September – One dead and hundreds are rescued after a fire erupts aboard the ship MV Sabuk Nusantara 91 in the waters off Sumenep, East Java.
- 21 September – Trials resume for the 2014 Paniai massacre.
- 22 September – KPK arrests a member of the Indonesian Supreme Court in connection with a corruption case.
- 25 September – Explosion rocked a police dormitory in Sukoharjo, injuring a policeman.
- 26 September – Supreme Court temporarily discharges Judge Sudrajad Dimyati and 5 other workers from work following allegations of corruption.
- 27 September – At least 500 are made homeless after a massive inferno strikes Cikini, Jakarta.
- 29 September – Armed assailants attacks group of Trans-Papua construction workers in Bintuni Bay area, killing 4.

=== October ===
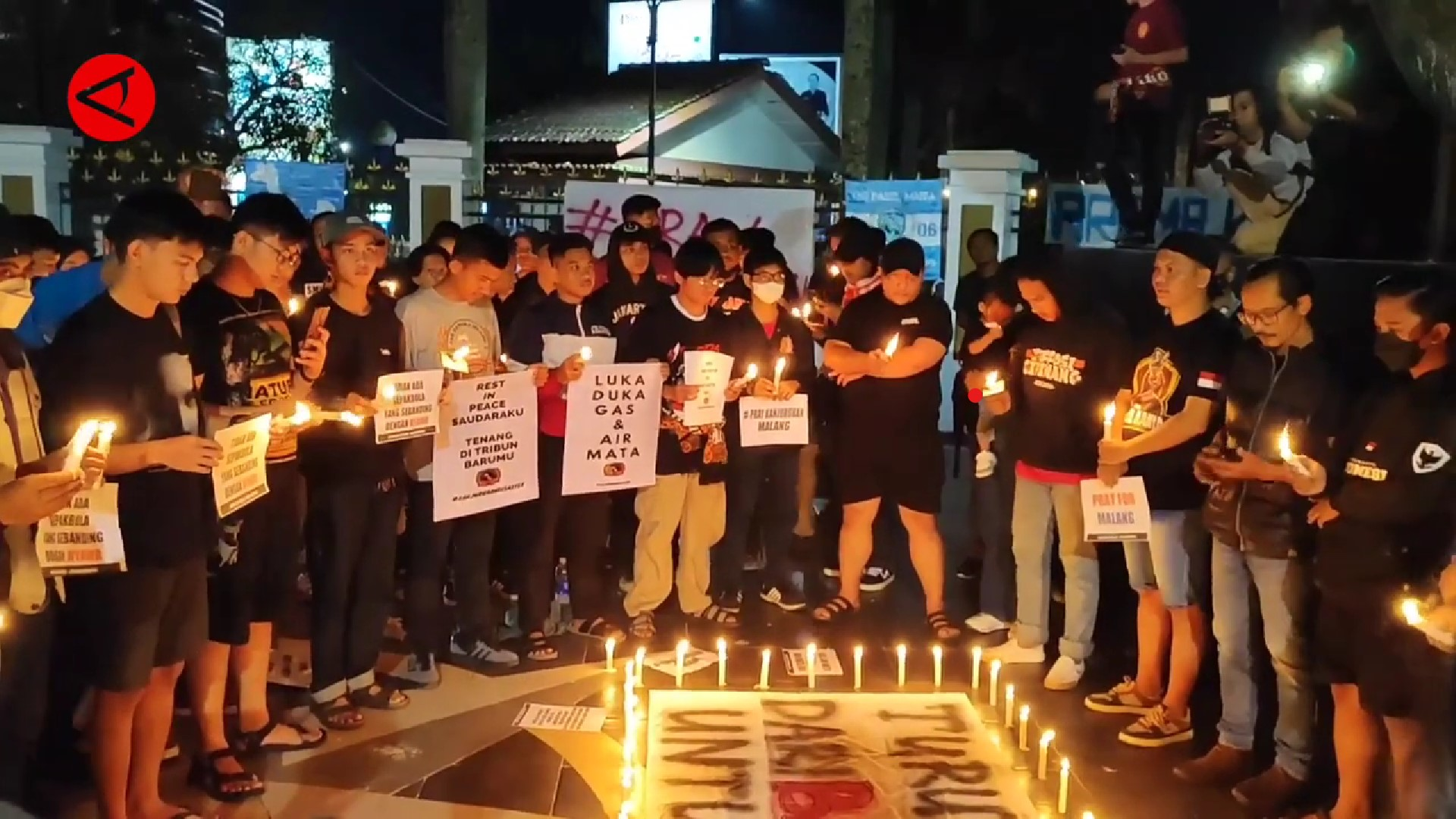
A vigil in Pangkal Pinang in response to the deaths of more than 130 people in Kanjuruhan

- 1 October
  - A magnitude 6.0 earthquake strikes North Tapanuli, Sumatra, killing two and damaging more than 1,000 structures.
  - About 130 people are killed by clashes and a crush-stampede between rival football supporters in Kanjuruhan Stadium, Malang Regency, East Java.
- 3 October
  - NasDem Party officially endorses incumbent governor of Jakarta Anies Baswedan as the presidential candidate of the upcoming 2024 election.
  - Government to create joint fact-finding team following the deadly crowd crush and clashes in Kanjuruhan.
- 6 October – Clash breaks out between residents of two villages in Southeast Maluku.
- 8 October – At least 30 are injured after second clashes between residents of rivalling villages in Southeast Maluku Regency.
- 11 October – Indonesian Doctors Association reports a spike in number of pediatric acute kidney injury cases of unknown origin.
- 12 October
  - Ex-mayor of Bekasi Rahmat Effendi is sentenced to 10 years in prison for corruption.
  - Officials from Bali and Australia alongside the families of victims holds a memorial for the 20th anniversary of the 2002 Bali bombing.
- 13 October
  - Officials announces possible link between rise of pediatric acute kidney injury to accidental consumption of ethylene glycol.
  - Police names Bambang Tri Mulyono as a suspect for blasphemy and hate speech over a social media post which allegedly depicts falsified diplomas of Joko Widodo's.
- 14 October
  - Mahfud Amin urges officials to conduct more "social-approach" regarding the Papuan conflict.
  - Police arrests head of West Sumatra Regional Police Teddy Minahasa for possible drug dealing network.
- 16 October – At least 500 are made homeless after inferno destroys 200 homes in Asmat Regency.
- 17 October – Ministry of Internal Affairs inaugurates Heru Budi Hartono as acting governor of Jakarta following Anies Baswedan's departure from the position.
- 18 October
  - FIFA President Gianni Infantino arrives in Indonesia and vows for reforms in Indonesian football.
  - President Joko Widodo announces plans to demolish Kanjuruhan Stadium.
- 19 October – Ministry of Health temporary bans syrup and liquid medicine following deaths of 99 children due to acute kidney injury.
- 24 October
  - Ferry carrying more than 350 people caught fire in East Nusa Tenggara, killing 20. Approximately 17 people are still missing in the disaster.
  - Police arrests 6 people for alleged links with deaths in Kanjuruhan Tragedy.
  - Ganjar Pranowo is sanctioned by his own party following his presidential election remarks.
- 25 October – A chador-wearing woman trespassed security and attempted to shoot several Presidential Guard in a suspected terror attack at the Indonesian Presidential Palace.
- 30 October – Dozens faints at a packed festival in Jakarta, prompting the police to cancel the event.
- 31 October – MV Mila Jaya, a ferry carrying at least 80 people, sinks off the coast of Sumenep. All aboard are rescued.

=== November ===
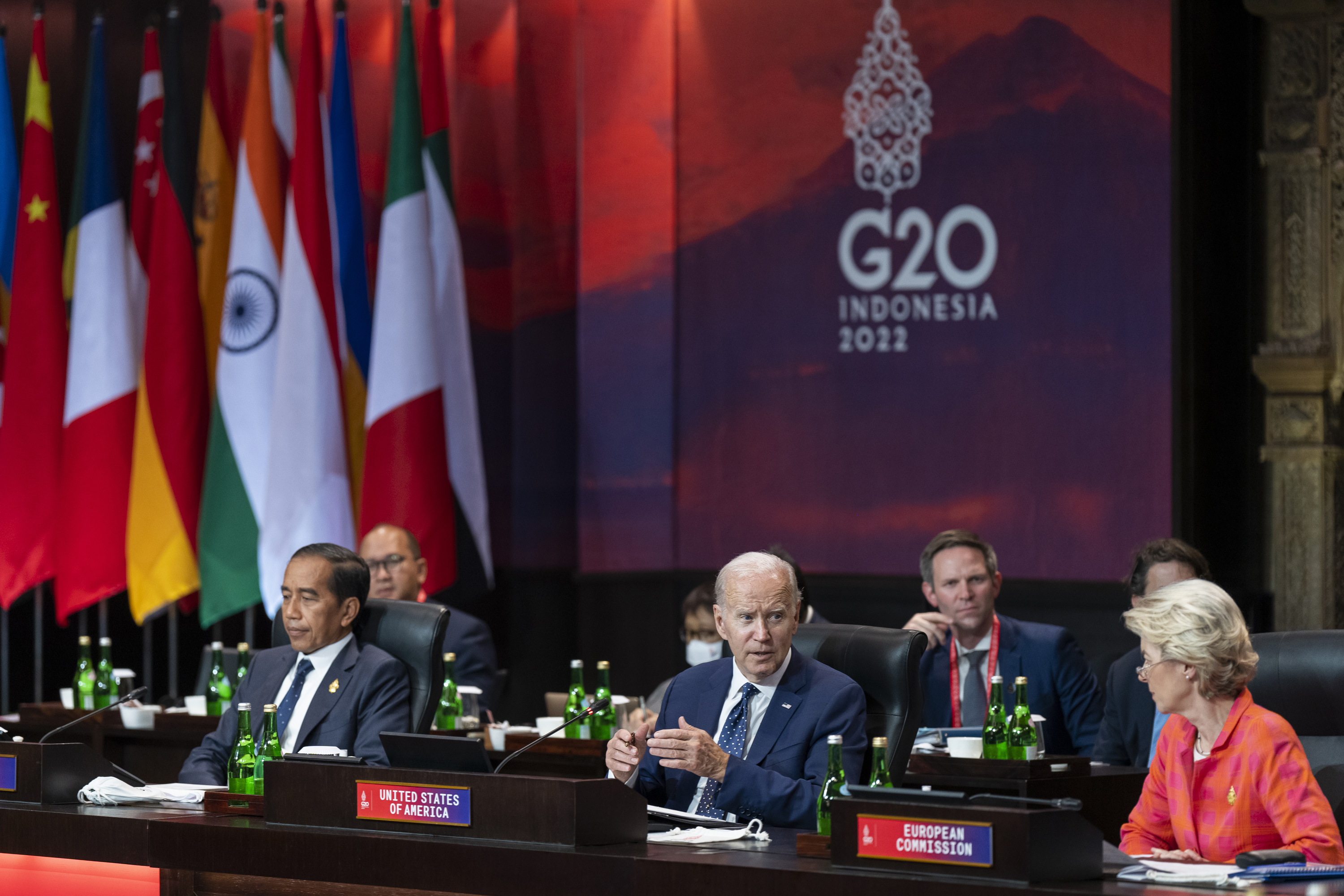
On 15–16 November, world leaders meet in the G20 Summit in the resort island of Bali

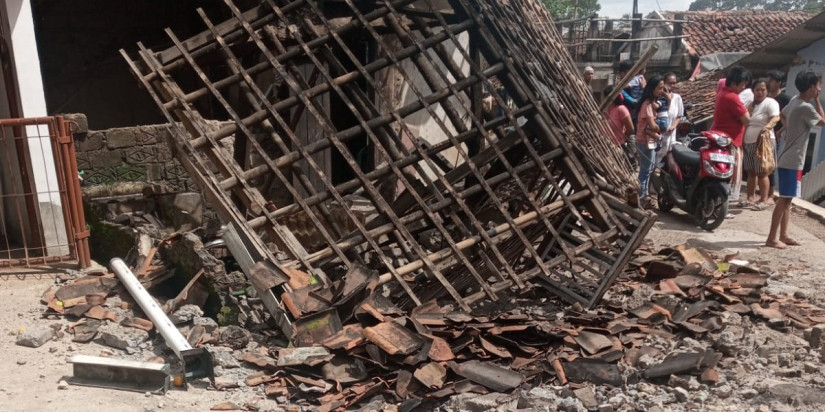
A magnitude 5.6 earthquake in Cianjur kills more than 300 people in the deadliest Indonesian earthquake since 2018

- 2 November – Analogue switch-off is officially completed.
- 4 November – More than 7,000 families are evacuated after massive flood sweeps 44 villages in Aceh Tamiang.
- 7 November – Food and Drug Agency officially revokes the licenses of three pharmaceutical companies over ethylene glycol poisoning.
- 11 November – Government officially inaugurates 3 new provinces in Papua and the provinces' respective acting leaders.
- 12 November
  - Third clashes in less than a month in Southeast Maluku killed two civilians and injured dozens.
  - Riot in Central Papuan regency of Dogiyai kills one and displaces hundreds as dozens of homes are set alight.
- 15–16 November – The 2022 G20 summit is held in Nusa Dua, Bali.
- 15 November – Developed nations pledges $20 billion to finance Indonesia's transition from coal-dependent to renewable energy.
- 16 November – Landslides in Gowa Regency kills 8.
- 17 November
  - Government officially recognizes Southwest Papua as the 38th province of Indonesia.
  - MV Mutiara Timur I, a ferry carrying 250 people, caught fire off the coast of Bali. All aboard are successfully rescued.
- 20 November – At least 30 structures are damaged after a magnitude 5.5 hits Kupang, East Nusa Tenggara.
- 21 November – A magnitude 5.6 earthquake strikes West Java, killing more than 300 people and injuring more than 7,500 others.
- 22 November – Bus plunges into ravine in Wonogiri, killing 8 and injuring 20.
- 27 November – An Indonesian Air Force helicopter carrying 4 people crashes into the sea off Bangka Belitung Islands, killing all aboard.
- 29 November – At least 5 are killed after a bus plunge in Pakpak Bharat Regency, North Sumatra.
- 30 November – Massive flood sweeps Pati, prompting the evacuation of more than 140 people. At least 2 residents are killed.

=== December ===
- 3 December – A deep magnitude 6.1 earthquake strikes Garut Regency, injures 1. At least 4 homes are damaged by the quake.
- 4 December
  - Tourist bus carrying 50 people plunges into a ravine in Magetan, killing 7.
  - A major eruption of Mount Semeru prompts evacuation of nearly 2,000 residents in East Java.
- 6 December – Indonesia legalizes a controversial penal code. The same criminal bill had sparked massive protests in 2019.
- 7 December – A suicide bomber detonates his explosives at a police station in Bandung, West Java, killing one person in addition to himself and injuring 11 others.
- 9 December – Explosion strikes a coal mine in Sawahlunto, killing 10 miners.
- 13 December – Regent of Meranti Islands Muhammad Adil threatens to secede from Indonesia and join Malaysia after accusing Ministry of Finance of not sharing gross income from Meranti's oil production.
- 15 December – Arson attack at a local market in Central Papua's Deiyai Regency injures 4 and destroys more than 50 stores.
- 17 December – Lightning-induced inferno destroys 52 houses and displaces hundreds in Manggarai, Jakarta.
- 18 December – At least 2 migrant workers are killed and 5 others are injured after a railway accident occurred in Jakarta - Bandung high-speed train project.
- 19 December – Admiral Yudo Margono is inaugurated by President Joko Widodo as the nation's new army general, replacing General Andika Perkasa.
- 30 December
  - President Joko Widodo issues decree on job creation, overturning the verdict of the Indonesian Constitutional Court regarding the Job Creation Bill.
  - Government announces the lifting of COVID-19 restrictions, hinting the end of the COVID-19 pandemic in Indonesia and starting the transition to the endemic stage.

== Deaths ==
=== January ===
- 2 January – Nindy Ellese Laoh, singer (b.1967)
- 10 January – Johan Anuar, Deputy Regent of Ogan Komering Ulu (b.1965)
- 13 January – Abdul Sajid Tamrin, mayor of Baubau (b.1952)
- 22 January – Putut Gunawan, politician (b.1964)
- 31 January – Norman Divo, singer (b.1988)

=== February ===
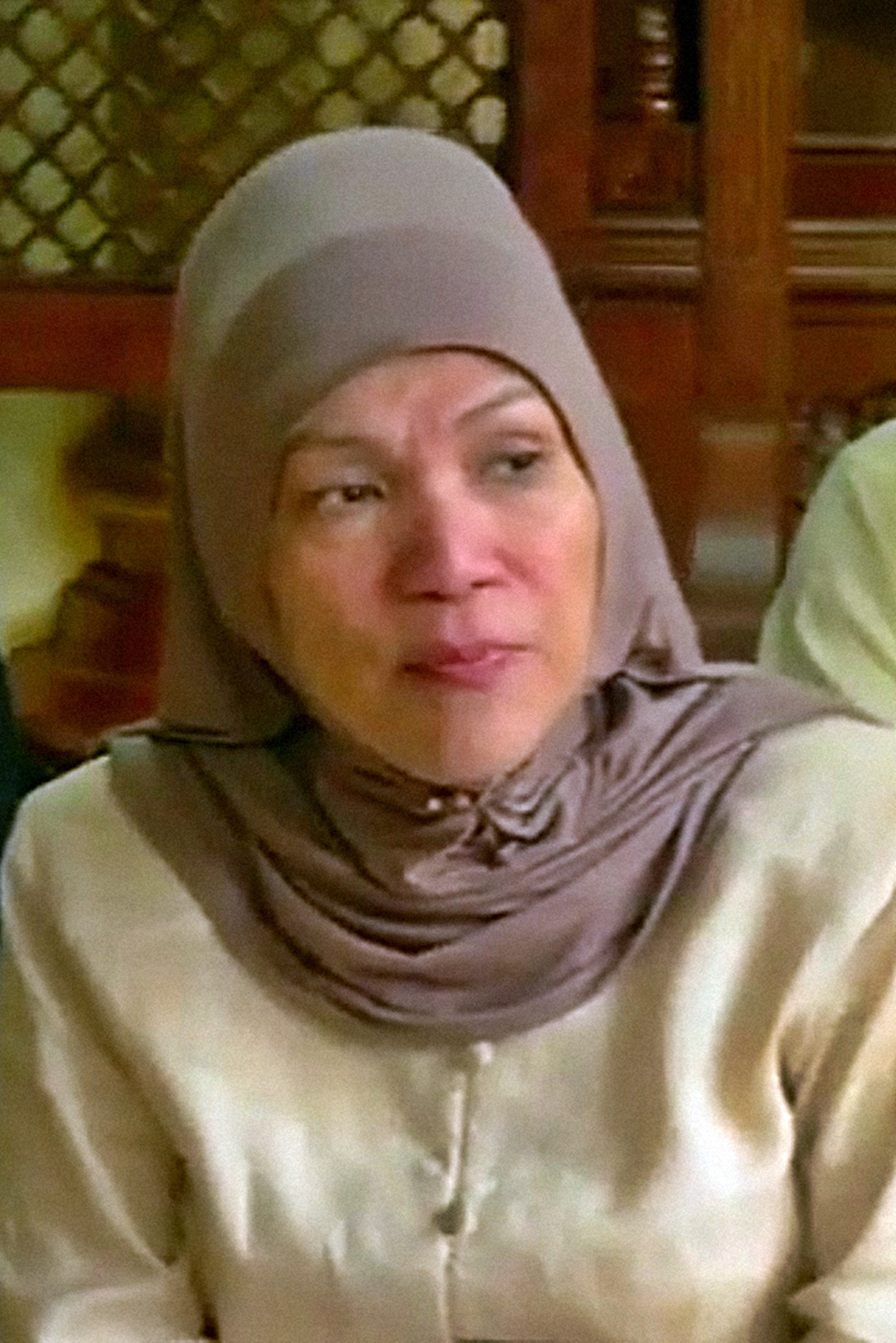
Dorce Gamalama

- 9 February – Yahya A. Muhaimin, former Minister of Education (b.1943)
- 13 February – Dasril Panin Datuk Labuan, deputy regent of Dharmasraya (b.1947)
- 16 February – Dorce Gamalama, TV personality (b.1963)
- 17 February – Ahmad Zulkifli Lubis, voice actor (b.1971)
- 25 February – Yus Yunus, singer (b.1962)
- 26 February – Srihadi Soedarsono, painter (b.1931)
- 27 February
  - Simon PS, actor (b.1937)
  - Arifin Panigoro, entrepreneur (b.1945)
  - Herman Abdullah, Mayor of Pekanbaru (2001–2011) (b.1950)
  - Ahmad Pairin, Regent of Central Lampung (2010–2015) (b.1950)

=== March ===
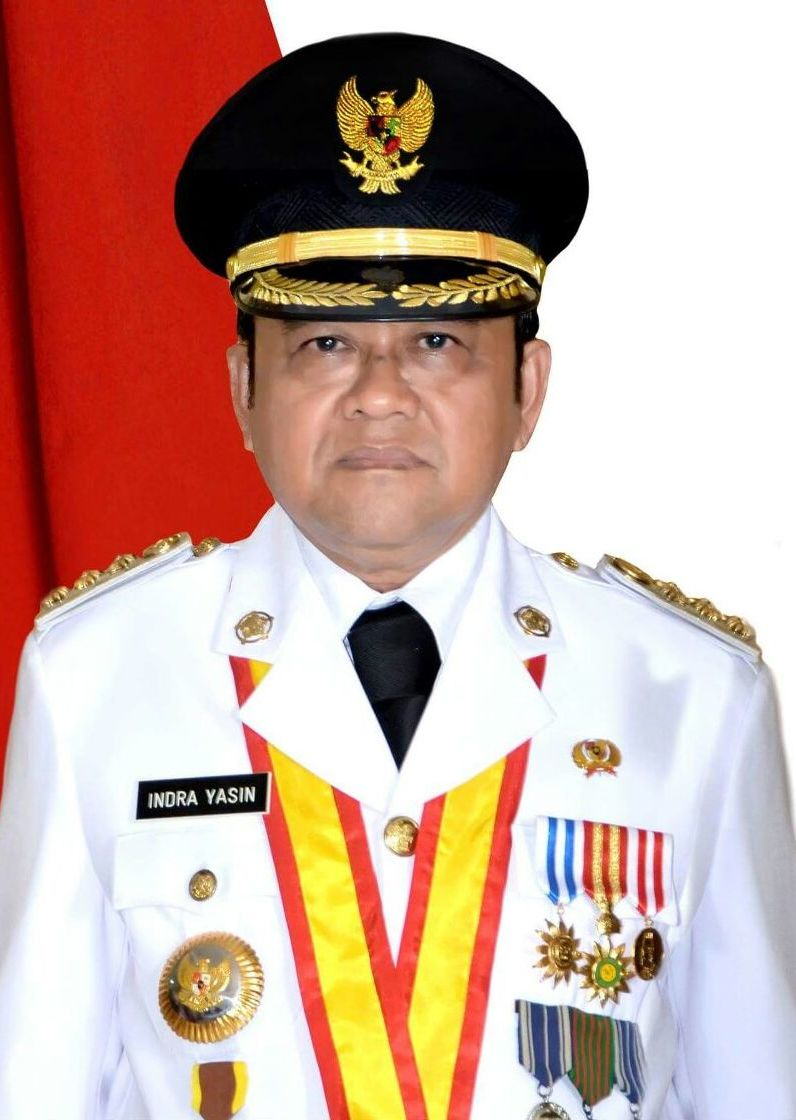
Indra Yasin

- 3 March – Indra Yasin, regent of North Gorontalo (b.1954)
- 8 March – Eddy Yusuf, former Vice Governor of South Sumatra (2008–2013) (b.1955)
- 9 March – Hilman Hariwijaya, writer (b.1964)
- 11 March
  - Jacobus Luna, Regent of Bengkayang (1999–2010) (b.1941)
  - Wellington Lod Wenda, Regent of Pegunungan Bintang (2005–2015) (b.1954)
- 13 March – Samsul Ashar, Mayor of Kediri (2009–2014) (b.1961)
- 18 March – Budi Tek, art collector (b.1957)
- 24 March – Roni Galoeng, manager (b.1982)
- 27 March – Ichsan Firdaus, politician (b.1976)
- 29 March – Lucky Andreono, Masterchef Indonesia Season 1 Champion (b.1980)

=== April ===
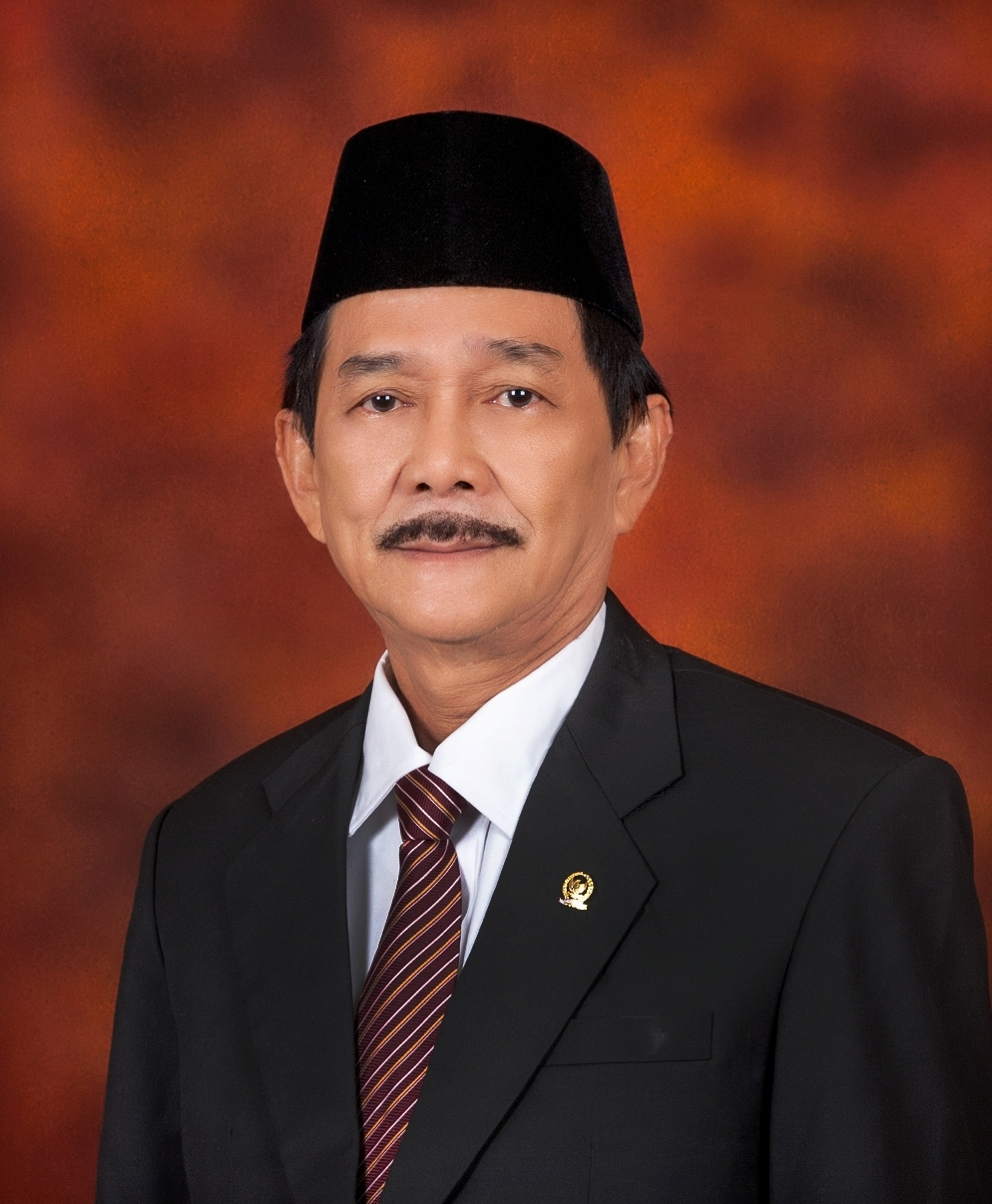
Hudarni Rani

- 7 April – Richard Oh, actor, director and writer (b.1959)
- 8 April – Hudarni Rani, governor of Bangka Belitung Islands (2002–2007) (b.1950)
- 10 April – Ponirin Meka, footballer (b.1956)
- 12 April – Ona Sutra, senior dangdut singer (b.1954)
- 17 April – Herson Mayulu, Regent of Bolaang Mongondow (2010–2018) (b.1959)
- 23 April – Suryati Marija, athlete (b.1970)
- 28 April – Harry Toos, guitarist (b.1945)
- 30 April – Markum Singodimedjo, Regent of Ponorogo (1994–2004) (b.1945)

=== May ===
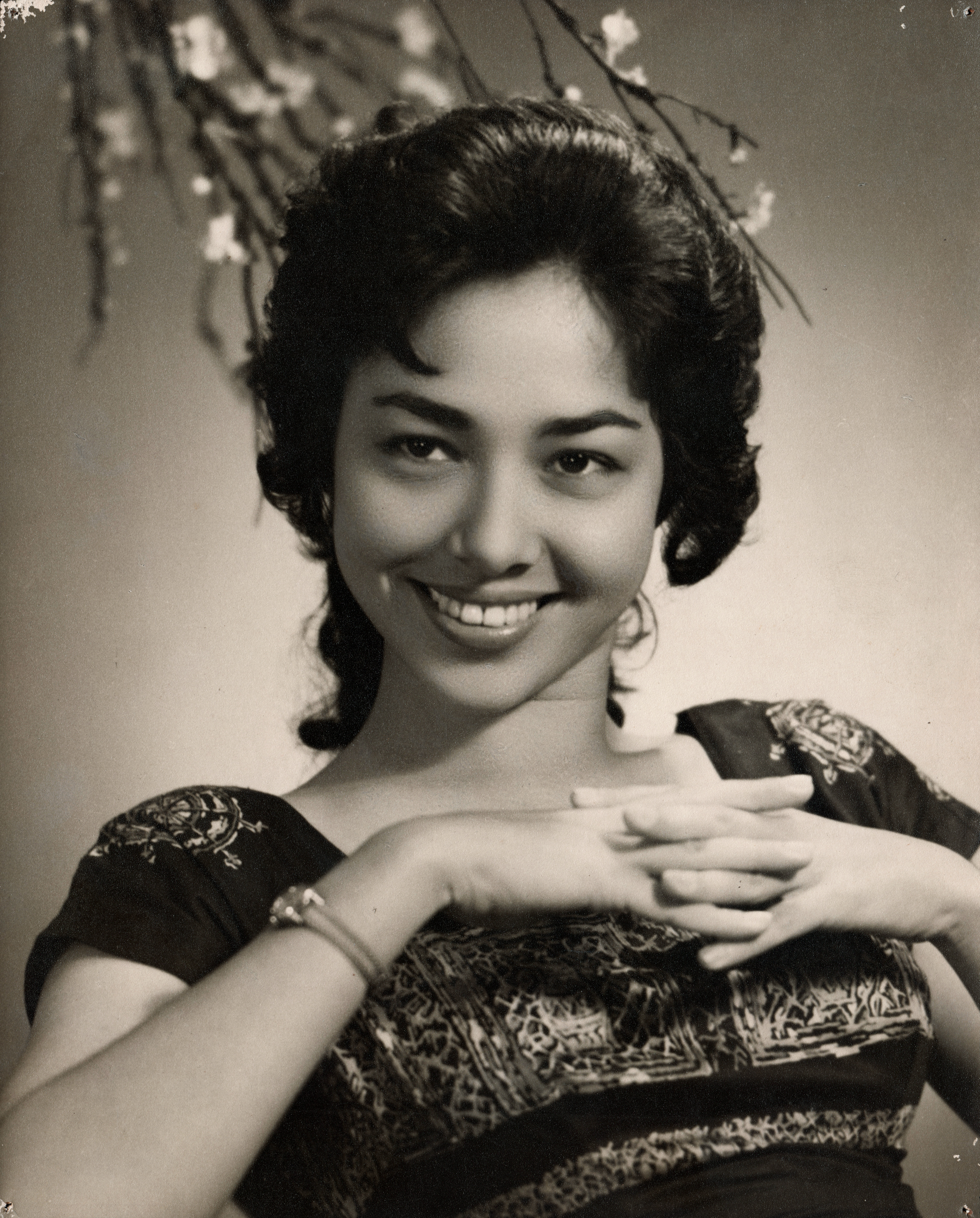
Mieke Widjaja

- 3 May – Mieke Widjaja, artist (b.1940)
- 9 May – Lily Chodidjah Wahid, politician (b.1948)
- 11 May – Widjojo Soejono, military general (b.1928)
- 16 May – Muhammad Taufiq Mukri, Deputy Regent of East Kotawaringin (2010–2021) (b.1952)
- 20 May – Ivo Nilakhresna, singer (b.1940)
- 21 May
  - Achmad Yurianto, government spokesperson (b.1962)
  - Viryan Azis, Member of the General Election Commission (KPU) (2007–2022) (b.1975)
- 22 May
  - Fahmi Idris, former minister (b.1943)
  - Oemarsono, former Regent of Wonogiri (1985–1995), Governor of Lampung (1998–2003) (b.1940)
  - Bonar Sianturi, military officer, Regent of Sintang (b.1944)
- 27 May – Ahmad Syafi'i Maarif, Islamic scholar, former chairman of Muhammadiyah (1998–2005) (b.1935).
- 30 May – Andi Rudiyanto Asapa, Regent of Sinjai (2003–2013) (b.1957)

=== June ===
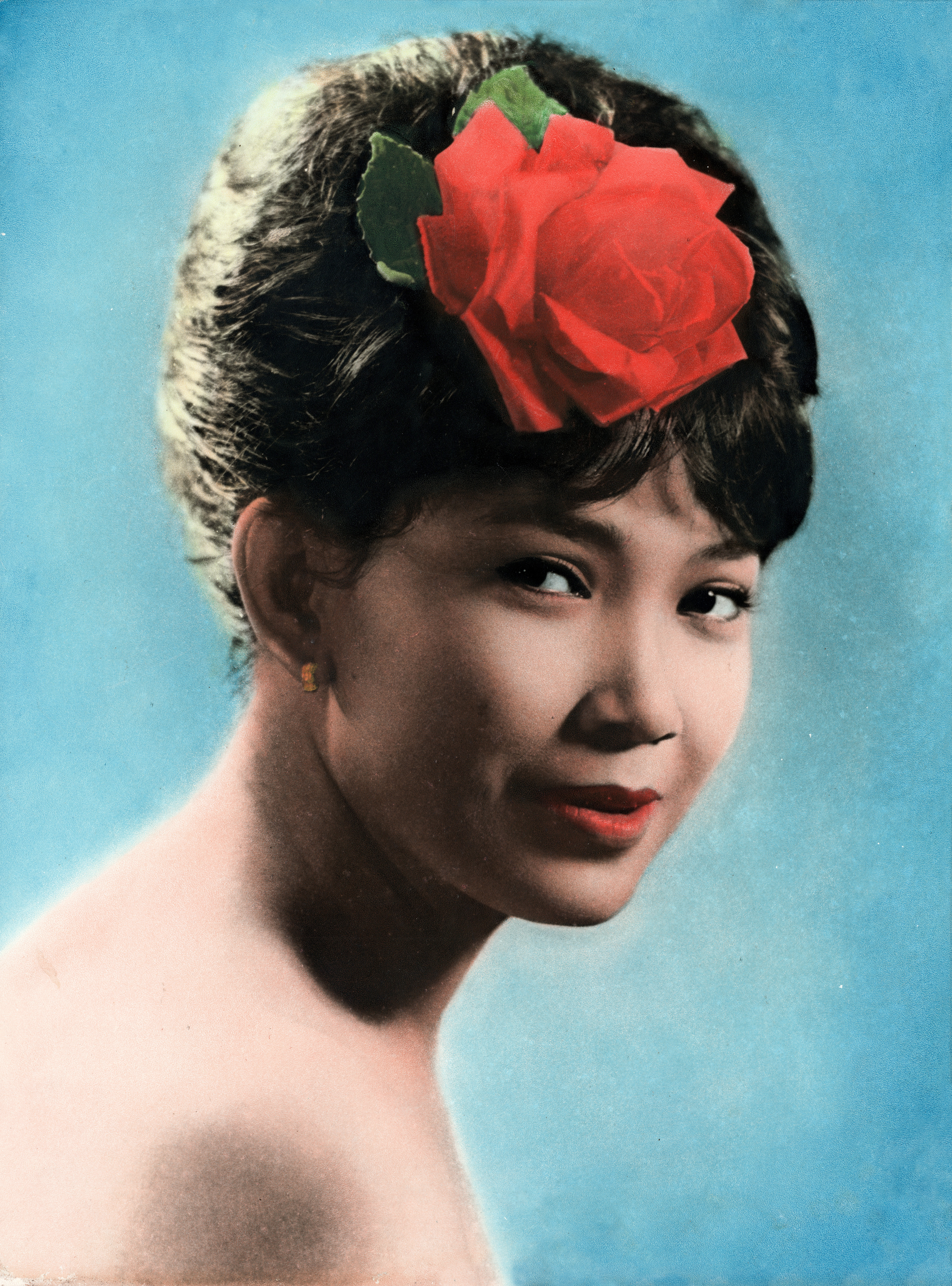
Rima Melati

- 6 June
  - Gafur Chalik, military officer (b.1941)
  - John Pangkey, politician and military officer (b.1950)
- 17 June – W.T.P Simarmata, clergyman and politician (b.1954)
- 19 June – Donny Suhendra, jazz musician (b.1957)
- 20 June
  - Chairul Akbar, military officer (b.1955)
  - Aang Hamid Suganda, regent of Kuningan (2003–2013) (b.1942)
- 23 June
  - Hendi Hendra Bayu Prasetya, military officer (b.1964)
  - Rima Melati, actress (b.1937)
  - Hendri Fiuser, Head Commissioner of Bali Regional Police (b.1974)

=== July ===
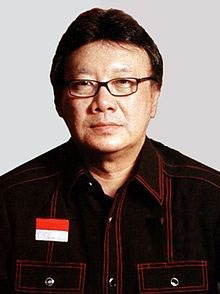
Tjahjo Kumolo

- 1 July – Tjahjo Kumolo, Minister of Administrative and Bureaucratic Reform (2019–2022) (b.1957)
- 2 June – Rachman Djalili, Mayor of Prabumulih (2003–2013) (b.1948)
- 5 July – Bob Tutupoly singer (b.1939)
- 8 July – Nofriansyah Yosua Hutabarat, police brigadier (b.1994)
- 10 July – Rini S. Bon Bon, comedian (b.1971)
- 11 July
  - Harimurti Kridalaksana, linguist (b.1939)
  - Imam Soetopo, military officer, Mayor of Surakarta (1995–2000) (b.1940)
- 16 July – Jemek Supardi, pantomime (b.1953)
- 17 July – Hadi Supeno, Deputy regent of Banjarnegara (2001–2006, 2011–2016) (b.1959)
- 31 July – Hubertus Leteng, bishop of Ruteng (b.1959)

=== August ===
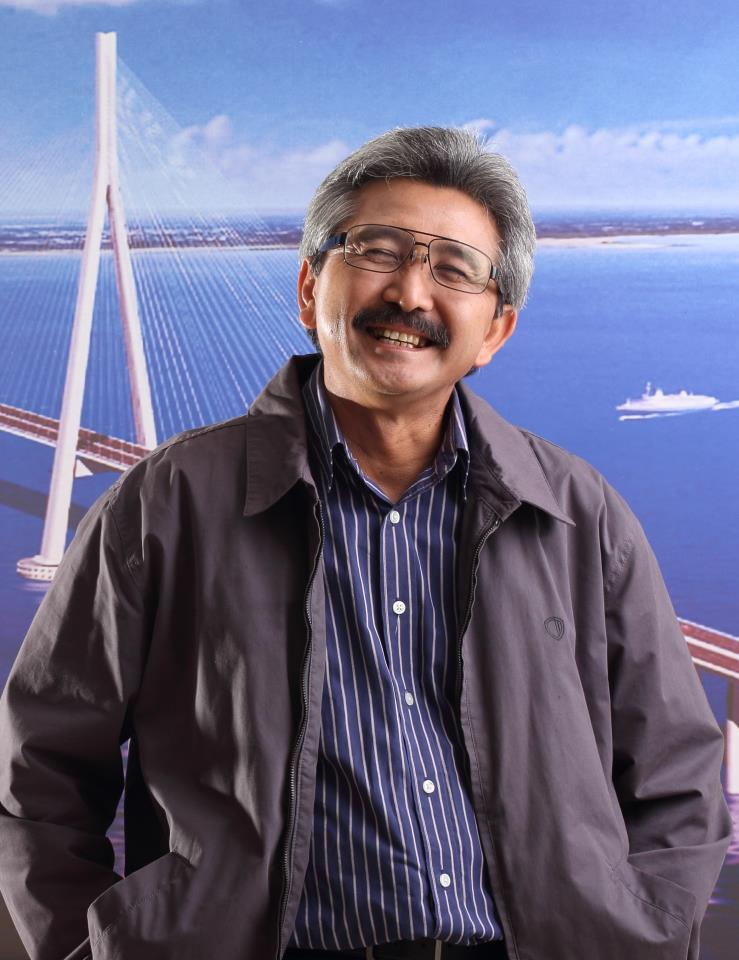
Hermanto Dardak

- 1 August – Pantur Silaban, physicist (b.1937)
- 3 August – Imdaad Hamid, Mayor of Balikpapan (2001–2011) (b.1944)
- 4 August – Eddy Gombloh, comedian (b.1941)
- 20 August – Hermanto Dardak, Deputy Minister of Public Works (2010–2014) (b.1957)
- 30 August – Achmad Roestandi, Judge of Constitutional Court of Indonesia (2003–2008) (b.1941)

=== September ===
- 1 September – Albert Hasibuan, activist, member of Presidential Advisory Council (2012–2015) (b.1939)
- 13 September – Abdul Chaer, linguist (b.1940)
- 18 September – Azyumardi Azra, intellectual, Muslim scholar (b.1955)
- 25 September – Ridwan Suwidi, Regent of Paser (2005–2015) (b.1936)
- 28 September – Suwandel Muchtar, Deputy Mayor of Payakumbuh (2012–2017) (b.1954)

=== October ===
- 30 September – Lucky Sondakh, academic, rector of Sam Ratulangi University (2004–2008) (b.1944)

=== November ===
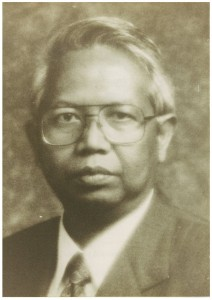
Bambang Subianto

- 1 November – Filep Karma, Papuan independence activist (b.1959)
- 4 November – Bambang Subianto, academic, Minister of Finance (1998–1999) (b.1945)
- 10 November – Zuiyen Rais, mayor of Padang (1993–2003) (b.1940)
- 13 November – Ari Hernanto Soemarno, Head of Pertamina (2006–2009) (b.1948)
- 18 November – Rudy Salam, actor (b.1948)
- 24 November – Taufik Kurniawan, Deputy Speaker of People's Representatives Council (2010–2019) (b.1967)

=== December ===
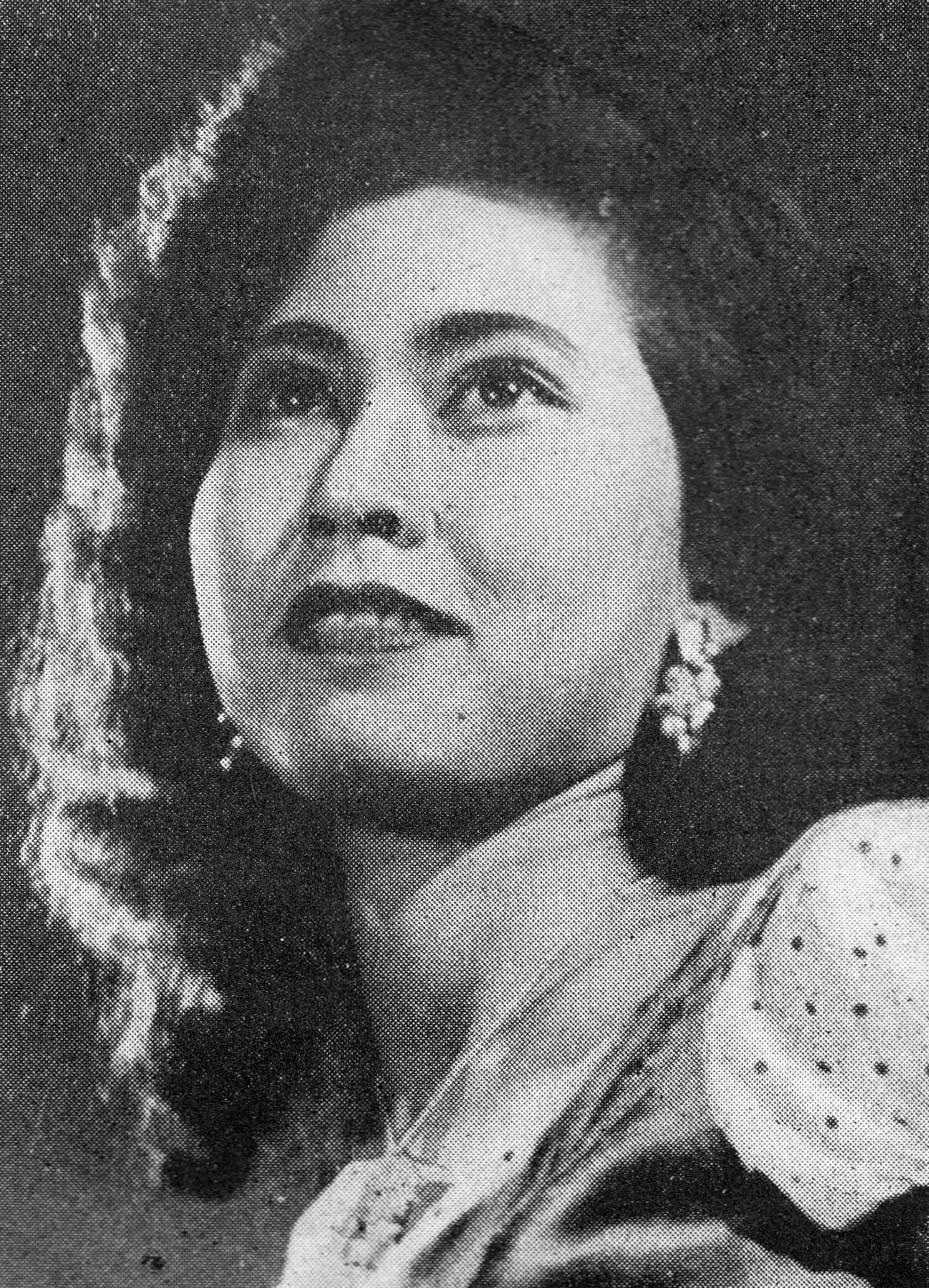
Aminah Cendrakasih

- 2 December – Ferry Mursyidan Baldan, Minister of Agrarian Affairs and Spatial Planning (2014–2016) (b.1961)
- 7 December
  - Rangga Sasana, celebrity (b.1967)
  - Muhammad Fadli, Deputy Mayor of Pagar Alam (2018–2023) (b.1985)
- 11 December – Sri Astari Rasjid, artist, former Indonesian Ambassador to Bulgaria (2016–2020) (b.1953)
- 12 December – Remy Sylado, author, actor, musician (b.1945)
- 14 December – Otis Pamutih, actor (b.1946)
- 20 December – Subroto, former Minister of Energy and Natural Resources (1978–1988), Secretary General of OPEC (1988–1994) (b.1923)
- 21 December – Aminah Cendrakasih, actress (b.1938)
- 25 December – Ridwan Saidi, politician (b.1942)
- 28 December – Abdul Hamid, voice actor (b.1948)
