= Aang (given name) =

Aang is a given name. Notable people with the name include:

== Birth ==
- Aang Kunaefi, an Indonesian military officer
- Aang Hamid Suganda, an Indonesian politician

== Fictional characters ==
- Aang, a fictional character in Avatar: The Last Airbender

== See also ==
- Avatar Aang: The Last Airbender, animated film directed by Lauren Montgomery
- Aangan (disambiguation)
- Aangan Terha, a Pakistani TV series
