= Yusriansyah Syarkawi =

Indonesian politician (1950–2021)

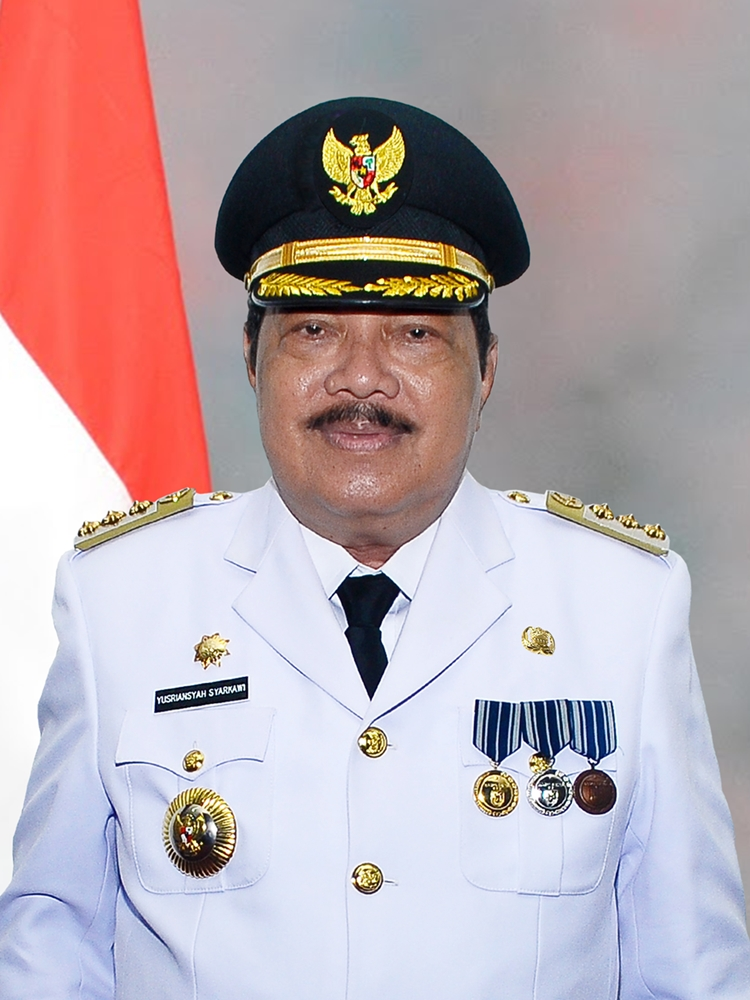

Regent of Paser
- In office 17 February 2016 – 16 February 2021
- Preceded by: Ridwan Suwidi
- Succeeded by: Katsul Wijaya (acting); Fahmi Fadli
- In office December 1999 – December 2004
- Preceded by: Arifin Saidi
- Succeeded by: Adi Buhari Muslim (acting); Ridwan Suwidi

Personal details
- Born: 26 July 1950 Tanah Grogot, Paser Regency, Indonesia
- Died: 16 February 2021 (aged 70) Samarinda, East Kalimantan, Indonesia
- Party: National Awakening Party
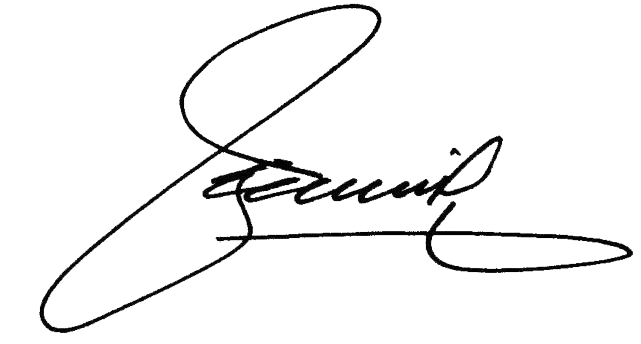
- Signature

Yusriansyah Syarkawi (26 July 1950 – 16 February 2021) was an Indonesian politician who served as Regent of Paser from 1999 to 2004, and again from 2016 until his death.

== Early life and education ==
Yusriansyah was born on 26 July 1950 in Tanah Grogot, Paser, East Kalimantan, as the son of Syarkawi and Siti Khadijah. After attending elementary and junior high school in Paser, Yusriansyah attended high school in Balikpapan. After graduating from the high school in 1969, he then enrolled at the Home Government Academy, an academy for civil servants, and finished in 1974.

== Bureaucratic career ==
Yusriansyah was posted to East Balikpapan in 1975, where he became the Head of the Rural Development Section in the East Kalimantan Subdistrict. Yusriansyah was promoted in 1976 and became the head of the entire subdistrict. Although his term as subdistrict head was supposed to end in early 1979, his term was extended for a few months.

Yusriansyah ended his tenure at East Kalimantan in 1979, and was transferred to Long Ikis subdistrict as the head until 1981. From then on, Yusriansyah studied at the Institute for Governance in Jakarta, and graduated in 1983 with a degree in governance (S.IP.). Yusriansyah returned to East Kalimantan and was assigned several posts at the Pasir Regency government, where he became the head of public relations and protocol of the Pasir Regency (1983–1984), head of regional income service (1985–1998), and as the head of region's Development Planning Agency from 1998.

== Political career ==
=== Regent of Paser (1999–2004) ===
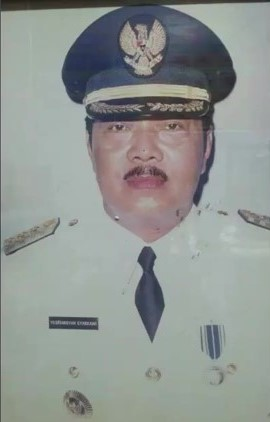
Official portrait of Yusriansyah Syarkawi for his first term.

Yusriansyah, who at that time was head of Pasir's Development Planning Agency, ran as a candidate for the regent in 1999. Although the candidacy of him and two other candidates were approved by the Minister of Internal Affairs, several officials demanded the reselection of candidates, stating that the candidates were chosen not by the current serving members of the council, but by the outgoing council. The council then held a vote to decide whether it would reselect its candidates, which resulted in a majority of members refusing a reselection. Another vote was then held to elect the regent and was won by Yusriansyah. He became the regent from December 1999 until December 2004. He was replaced by Adi Buhari Muslim, the chairman of East Kalimantan's Development Planning Agency, as acting regent.

During his tenure, a conflict between Nusantara Plantation and the villages surrounding the plantation occurred. The villagers began plotting the plantation's land, causing at least 200 employees from the plantations to leave their job. Yusriansyah Syarkawi's government acted as a mediator between the two parties. Yusriansyah Syarkawi initially stated that he had no plans to take over the plantation. However, as the conflict became prolonged, Yusriansyah Syarkawi's government began attempts to buy the plantation. He stated that he would buy the plantation if no agreement between the conflicting parties could be reached.

In light of the regional autonomy implemented by the government, the Ministry of Education implemented the education autonomy in 2001. Matters relating to education were handed over from the provincial government to the regency government. Following the enactment of the education autonomy, Yusriansyah remarked that his regency allocated 13-15% of its annual budget for education and that the allocation was less than the expected allocation percentage of 25%. Yusriansyah also stated that Paser lacked elementary school teachers. To cope with the problem, Yusriansyah increased the number of non-permanent teachers in the region.

Yusriansyah oversaw the separation of the Penajam North Paser Regency from the Paser Regency on 11 March 2002.

=== 2005 Paser regent election ===
After his term as regent expired, Yusriansyah was nominated as the Regent of Paser in the 2005 Paser regent election held on 29 June 2005. Yusriansyah was supported by Golkar, Crescent Star Party, Democratic Nationhood Party, and the Indonesian Democratic Party of Struggle, and he picked Mardikansyah as his running mate. Yusriansyah obtained 29,063 votes in the election and lost to Ridwan Suwidi, who obtained 34,300 votes. Yusriansyah's successor, Adi Bukhari, handed over his office to Ridwan on 29 August 2005.

=== 2010 Paser regent election ===
Yusriansyah attempted to run again in the 2010 Paser regent election following his loss in 2005. Yusriansyah picked Azhar Baharuddin as his running mate and received endorsement from the United Development Party, Democratic Renewal Party, National Awakening Party, and the People's Conscience Party. Ballot numbers for Yusriansyah were assigned several days after he was designated as eligible, and Yusriansyah became candidate number four in the election. One of Yusriansyah's opponents in the election was Ridwan Suwidi, the incumbent regent.

Elections were held on 10 June 2010. Although initial results from the General Elections Commission indicated a victory for Ridwan Suwidi, Yusriansyah's electoral team claimed that he was winning the election instead. The official results were announced 15 June and Ridwan Suwidi was announced as the winner of the election with 40,882 votes or 40% of the total votes. Yusriansyah lost the election with 32,814 votes or 32% of the total votes. Yusriansyah attempted to dispute the results and brought the dispute to the Constitutional Court of Indonesia. However, the court rejected his dispute, citing lack of evidence.

=== Regent of Paser (2016–2021) ===
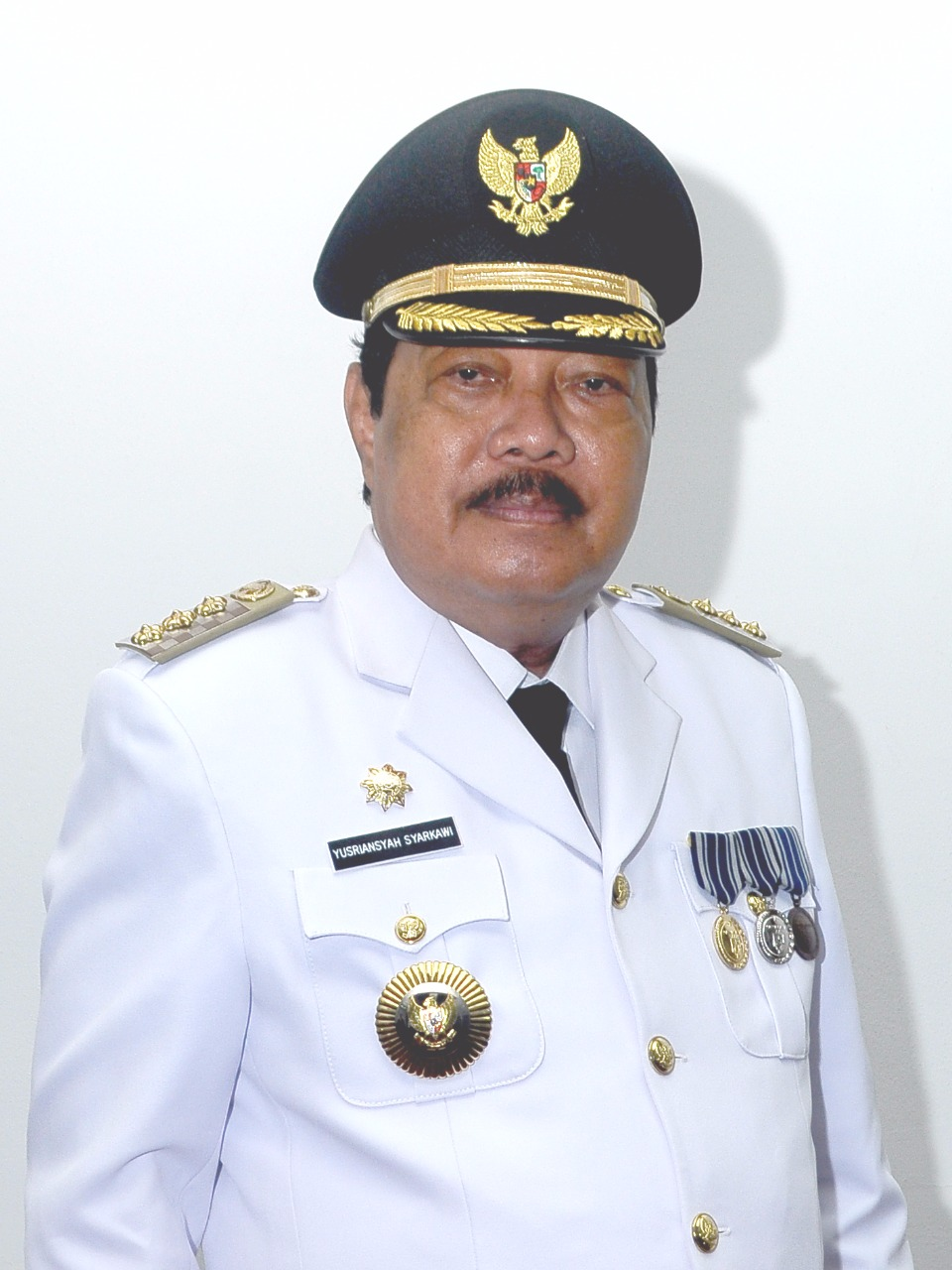
Yusriansyah Syarkawi in 2019.

Yusriansyah ran again in the 2016 Paser regent election, marking his fourth attempt to become the Regent of Paser. Yusriansyah was endorsed by the National Awakening Party and the Golkar Party. As Yusriansyah was the chairman of the party's shura council in the region, Yusriansyah picked Muhammad Mardikansyah, a Golkar Party member, as his running mate. The pair won the election with 76,005 votes or 64,49% of the total votes and was sworn into office on 17 February 2016.

In the midst of his term as regent, Yusriansyah's deputy, Muhammad Mardikansyah, died on 30 January 2019. An internal election within the Paser's parliament was held shortly afterwards on 26 June. H. Kaharudin, a former speaker of the Paser's parliament, won the vice regent election with 21 out of 24 votes. He was sworn in as Yusriansyah's deputy on 13 August.

After his death on 16 February, the Regency Secretary of Paser, Katsul Wijaya, was appointed to succeed him in acting capacity.

== Personal life ==
Yusriansyah was married to Mutiarny. The marriage resulted in four children, namely Ida Yustiana, Fahmi Padli, Hendra Wahyudi, and Indra Pardian.

Yusriansyah's family was one of the seven dominant political dynasties in East Kalimantan. Yusriansyah's son, Hendra Wahyudi, is the incumbent speaker of Paser's parliament, while his other son, Fahmi Fadli, is the incumbent regent of Paser. Consequently, Hendra Wahyudi's wife, Yenni Eviliana, was elected as a member of East Kalimantan's parliament for the 2019–2024 term.

== Death ==
Yusriansyah died at 05.30 on 16 February 2021, a day before his term as regent expired. Yusriansyah was buried at a family cemetery in Tepian Batang village, Tanah Grogot Subdistrict. He was buried in a military funeral and in compliance with COVID-19 prevention guidelines. His vice regent, H. Kaharuddin, delivered a eulogy for him.

Due to the symptoms experienced by Yusriansyah prior to his death, several news outlets alleged that Yusriansyah died due to COVID-19 during the COVID-19 pandemic in Indonesia, noting his positive results from the rapid antigen test. Several hours after his death, the Paser government published his results from the polymerase chain reaction test, stating that Yusriansyah tested negative for COVID-19.

== Awards ==
- Civil Service Long Service Medals, 3rd Class (1989)
- Civil Service Long Service Medals, 2nd Class (1999)
- Civil Service Long Service Medals, 1st Class (2019)
