= Buddhi Dharma University =

Higher education institution in Tangerang, Indonesia

- Type: Universitas
- Established: 12 January 2015
- Rector: Harimurti Kridalaksana
- Location: Karawaci, Tangerang
- Website: www.buddhidharma.ac.id

Buddhi Dharma University (UBD) is a private university in Karawaci, Tangerang, Banten. It is the first Buddhist university in Indonesia. It is a transformation of the College of Buddhi, which is managed by the Religious Society and Social Boen Tek Bio. Four higher education institutions have merged: STIE Buddhi, STMIK Buddhi, STBA Buddhi, and ASMI Buddhi.

== History ==
On December 12, 2014 the first Boen Tek Bio merged four higher education institutions (id:Perguruan Tinggi Buddhi) and changed the name to Buddhi Dharma University. The UBD inauguration was conducted by the mayor of Tangerang Arief R Wismansyah on January 12, 2015. The inauguration ceremony inducted Harimurti Kridalaksana as Rector.

== Facilities ==
Buddhi Dharma University has three lecture halls.

== Faculties ==
- The faculty of Business offers Management, Accounting, Business Administration and Accounting (D3) courses.
- The faculty of Science and Technology offers the departments of Physics, Electrical Engineering, Industrial Engineering, Information Engineering, Information Engineering, Software Engineering, Multimedia Engineering and Networks (D4), and Information Management (D3).
- The faculty of Humanities and Literature includes English and Communication Studies departments.
