= Kamus Besar Bahasa Indonesia =

Indonesian dictionary

The Kamus Besar Bahasa Indonesia (KBBI; lit. 'Great Dictionary of the Indonesian Language') is the official dictionary of the Indonesian language compiled by the Agency for Language Development and Cultivation and published by Balai Pustaka. This dictionary is the primary reference for the standard Indonesian language because it is the most complete and accurate Indonesian dictionary ever published by publishers who have patent rights from the government of the Republic of Indonesia under the auspices of the Indonesian Ministry of Education, Culture, Research, and Technology. It is also considered canonical to measure which words have been formally incorporated into Indonesian.

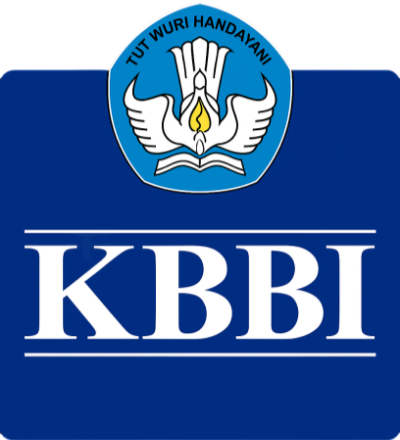
KBBI Logo

== Publication history ==
=== First Edition ===
The first modern KBBI dictionary was published during the 5th Indonesian Language Congress on 28 October 1988. The first edition contains approximately 62,000 entries. The dictionary was compiled by a team led by the Head of the Language Center, Anton M. Moeliono, with chief editors Sri Sukesi Adiwimarta and Adi Sunaryo.

=== Second Edition ===
Although many praised the first issue of the KBBI, it was not without criticism. In response to fulfil criticism, a second edition was released immediately. The second edition was compiled under the leadership of Lukman Ali, with Chief Editor Harimurti Kridalaksana, and contained approximately 72,000 entries. It was published in 1991.

=== Third Edition ===
The rapid development of the Indonesian vocabulary has prompted the government to document new terms and update the previous edition of the dictionary. Therefore, the then Head of the Language Center, who also acted as Editor-in-Chief, Hasan Alwi, decided to publish the Third Edition in 2000, containing about 78,000 entries.

=== Fourth Edition and Fifth ===
Then it was followed by the fourth edition in 2008, which had more than 90,000 entries under the supervision of Dendy Sugono. The fifth edition was published in 2016 and launched by the former Minister of Education and Culture of Indonesia, Muhadjir Effendy, with around 112,000 entries. Unlike the previous editions, the fifth edition is published in three forms: print, offline (iOS and Android applications), and online (kbbi.kemdikbud.go.id). Online access allows anybody to find the meaning and propose new vocabulary conveniently. The latest online dictionary also provides the etymology of some Indonesian lexicon.

=== Sixth Edition ===
The sixth edition was launched on 26 October 2023 during the 12th Indonesian Language Congress. The sixth edition contained 120,000 words and is currently completely online. Endang Aminudin Aziz, Head of Language Development and Fostering Agency, expected that the final form of 6th KBBI will contain 200,000 words, the deadline first being October 2024 (when 180,000 words were eventually ready), with an updated estimate being December 2024. The enlargement of KBBI was established as a national policy, with the budget support of 14 billion Indonesian rupiah. To achieve the goal, the Agency engaged a team of 165 annotators, 46 editors and 15 validators, and sought assistance from Oxford University Press and Lexical Computing.

== Editorial practices ==
The language it records is formal; it omits words that are considered slang or foreign, and its aim is prescriptive. The authors note that "the compilation of a dictionary constitutes an effort of language codification which becomes part of standardization of a language. Continual work is done towards future versions, to ensure the dictionary remains relevant to changes in the Indonesian language, and the authors are open to criticism and advice on how the work might accurately reflect Indonesian.

Endang Aminudin Aziz revealed that KBBI contains just a minuscule fraction of the total actual current Indonesian words. As he revealed on 28 October 2023, the Indonesian language includes a total of 2 billion words, which are listed and maintained by Korpus, an in-house language analytics tool developed by linguists and researchers of the Language Development and Fostering Agency. The tool later ranked the specific word usage in current Indonesian literature, or any source collected by the agency. With certain criteria established by the agency, specific words will be selected to be added to the new version of KBBI. He also said that new loan words and/or slang that become too frequently used, widespread, and eventually become commonly used in daily conversations may be considered for inclusion in future KBBI versions.

== Reception ==
The dictionary has been criticized for being too selective and excluding words that are in common use. Writing in The Jakarta Post, Setiono Sugiharto states, "KBBI should be appreciated as a byproduct of work by Indonesian scholars who persistently show their commitment to the development of the Indonesian lexicon."
