= Bloody Paniai case =

Massacre

Bloody Paniai
- Part of the Papua Conflict
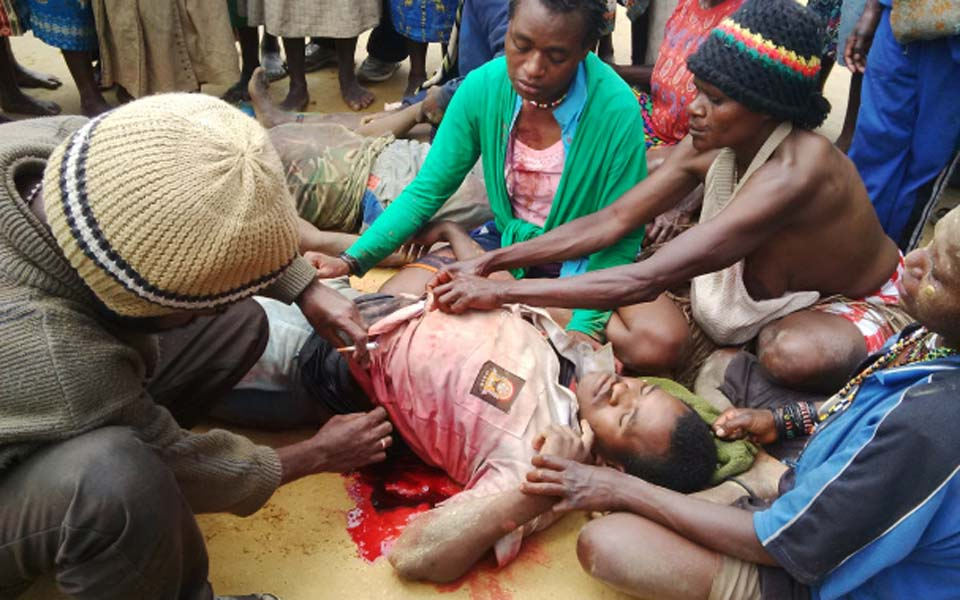
- Yulian Yeimo (front) and Alfius Youw (back) lay mortally wounded
- Location: Enarotali, Paniai Regency, Indonesia
- Date: December 8, 2014
- Target: Civilians
- Attack type: Shooting
- Deaths: 5
- Injuries: 17
- Perpetrator: Indonesian Army

The Bloody Paniai case, or the Enarotali massacre (Indonesian: Kasus Paniai Berdarah / Pembantaian Enarotali) was a mass shooting by the Indonesian army from 753rd Special Raider Infantry Battalion of Korem 173/Praja Vira Braja of Kodam XVII/Cendrawasih which killed five teenagers and wounded of 17 others in Enarotali, Paniai Regency, Central Papua, Indonesia on 8 December 2014.

== Events ==
On the night of 7 December 2014, Yulianus Yeimo (aged 14) and three of his friends in Ipakiye village criticised an Indonesian military officer for driving his motorcycle without headlights. The officer later returned to the location with four soldiers of 753rd Special Raider Infantry Battalion and violently beat the youth. Yeimo suffered severe head injuries and fell into a coma. The next day, people from the town of Enarotali, Paniai Regency protested against the torturing of Yeimo and several of his friends. The following day, about 1,000 young men, women and children gathered at a football field in Enarotali to peacefully protest against the behaviour of the army personnel when the security forces opened fire at them, killing five boys and injuring 17 others, those killed were Abia Gobay (17), Yulian Yeimo (17), Simon Degei (16), Alfius Youw (17) and Otianus Gobai (18). According to Time, based on an official document an order was sent to the soldiers through internal radio: “If the masses offer resistance more than three times, shoot them dead”.

== Aftermath ==
President Joko Widodo, who had just entered office in 2014 ordered the National Commission on Human Rights (Komnas HAM) to investigate the matter. On February 19, 2020 Komnas HAM declared that the shootings were a "gross human rights violation", and further accused TNI and the Indonesian police of obstructing justice regarding the incident. Yulianus Yeimo died in April 2018.

== See also ==
- Human rights in Indonesia
- 2019 Papua protests
