= Ahmad Zulkifli Lubis =

Indonesian actor, voice actor, comedian, and occupation (1971–2022)

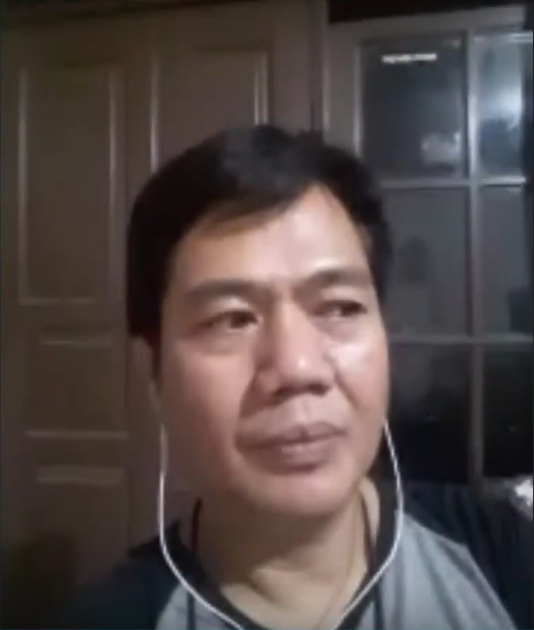
- Lubis in 2021
- Born: 23 February 1971; North Sumatera, Indonesia
- Died: 17 February 2022 (aged 50); Jakarta, Indonesia
- Other names: Ahmad Zulkifli; Iphie Lubis
- Occupations: Actor, voice actor, comedian, various others
- Years active: 1992–2022

Ahmad Zulkifli Lubis (23 February 1971 – 17 February 2022) was an Indonesian actor, voice actor, comedian, and various others who used to work at PT Indosiar Visual Mandiri. He dubbed anime and other foreign content into the Indonesian language. He could perform voices for young boys, teenage boys and adult men. He was also known by the names Ahmad Zulkifli for short, or Iphie Lubis as his nickname.

== Biography ==
Born on 23 February 1971, Ahmad Zulkifli Lubis first worked as a dubber for Arvisco, dubbing telenovelas and Indian films, in 1992. Lubis then joined Indonesian TV network Indosiar and dubbed various shows, including Case Closed (Detektif Conan in Indonesia) where he voiced Shinichi Kudo/Conan Edogawa.

Lubis died on 17 February 2022, at the age of 50, two days after being admitted to the hospital.

== Voice roles ==
=== Dubbing ===
==== Anime television ====
- Crush Gear Turbo – Kouya Marino
- Detective Conan – Shinichi Kudo/Conan Edogawa
- Digimon Adventure – Jo Kido (first voice)
- Doraemon – Suneo Honekawa (1994–2006, 2008–2009)
- Dragon Ball Z Kai – Krillin, Yamcha
- Dr. Slump – Opening dub vocal, Obotchama, Son Goku
- Fairy Tail – Natsu Dragneel
- Isami's Incredible Shinsen Squad – Kikumaru, Hiroshi
- Gintama (first season) – Shinpachi Shimura (second voice)
- Gundam Seed Destiny – Kira Yamato
- Gundam Wing – Duo Maxwell
- Keroro Gunso (first season) – Keroro
- Neon Genesis Evangelion – Kensuke Aida
- Pokémon – Ash Ketchum (Satoshi), Meowth (additional voice) (2001-current)
- Sailor Moon – Shingo Tsukino, Gurio Umino
- Scan2Go – Kaz
- Tantei Gakuen Q – Kyū Renjō
- Wedding Peach – Yōsuke Fūma

==== Anime films ====
- Detective Conan: The Time-Bombed Skyscraper - Shinichi Kudo/Conan Edogawa
- Detective Conan: The Fourteenth Target - Shinichi Kudo/Conan Edogawa
- Detective Conan: The Last Wizard of the Century - Shinichi Kudo/Conan Edogawa
- Detective Conan: Captured In Her Eyes - Shinichi Kudo/Conan Edogawa
- Detective Conan: Countdown to Heaven - Shinichi Kudo/Conan Edogawa
- Detective Conan: The Phantom of Baker Street - Shinichi Kudo/Conan Edogawa
- Detective Conan: Crossroad in the Ancient Capital - Shinichi Kudo/Conan Edogawa
- Detective Conan: Magician of the Silver Sky - Shinichi Kudo/Conan Edogawa
- Detective Conan: Strategy Above the Depths - Shinichi Kudo/Conan Edogawa
- Detective Conan: The Private Eye's Requiem - Shinichi Kudo/Conan Edogawa
- Detective Conan: Jolly Roger in the Deep Azure - Shinichi Kudo/Conan Edogawa
- Detective Conan: Full Score of Fear - Shinichi Kudo/Conan Edogawa
- Detective Conan: The Raven Chaser - Shinichi Kudo/Conan Edogawa
- Detective Conan: The Lost Ship in the Sky - Shinichi Kudo/Conan Edogawa
- Pokémon: Lucario and the Mystery of Mew - Ash Ketchum (Satoshi)
- Pokémon Ranger and the Temple of the Sea - Ash Ketchum (Satoshi)
- Pokémon: The Rise of Darkrai - Ash Ketchum (Satoshi)
- Pokémon: Giratina and the Sky Warrior - Ash Ketchum (Satoshi)
- Pokémon: Arceus and the Jewel of Life - Ash Ketchum (Satoshi)
- Pokémon: Zoroark: Master of Illusions - Ash Ketchum (Satoshi)

==== Western animation ====
- Ben 10 (first season) - Ben Tennyson
- The Adventures of Jimmy Neutron: Boy Genius (first season) - Carl Wheezer
- The Garfield Show - Nermal
- Transformers: Prime - Jack Darby
- The Amazing World Of Gumball - Gumball Watterson
- SpongeBob SquarePants (season 9–12) - SpongeBob SquarePants
- Ben 10: Omniverse (Ben Tennyson)
- Ben 10 Reboot (Ben Tennyson)

==== Animated films ====
- Monster House - DJ Walters

==== Live action films ====
- Harry Potter and the Deathly Hallows – Part 1 - Harry Potter (Daniel Radcliffe) (Aired on HBO dubbed)
- Harry Potter and the Deathly Hallows – Part 2 - Harry Potter (Daniel Radcliffe) (Aired on HBO dubbed)
