= Fast Action Response =

Indonesian non-profit organization

The Fast Action Response (Indonesian: Aksi Cepat Tanggap (ACT)) was an Indonesian non-profit organization that focused on humanitarian work, disaster management, and provided assistance from the emergency phase to the post-disaster recovery phase. The permit for the organization was revoked by the Indonesian government in 2022 due to allegations of misusing the funds from its donors.

== History ==
The organization took its first action in 1994 in Liwa, West Lampung in response to an earthquake. It was renamed Aksi Cepat Tanggap Foundation on 21 April 2005.

Aside from emergency response activities, ACT also expanded its activities to post-disaster recovery programs, community empowerment and development, as well as spiritual-based programs such as qurban, zakat, and waqf. ACT planned to be at the forefront of "human tragedy events" such as natural disasters, droughts, famines, and wars, and to oppose the oppression of minority groups in various countries.

In 2012, the organization expanded across Indonesia, opening offices across 30 provinces and 100 districts in Indonesia. In the same year, ACT also claimed to have established a presence in 22 other countries.

== Work ==
During the 2013 Egyptian coup d'état, ACT sent three of its volunteers to Cairo to provide medical assistance. In the same year, ACT also provided assistance for Rohingya Muslims in Myanmar, claiming that Muslims in Myanmar have to practice their religion in secret.

In 2014, ACT sent four of its volunteers, along with actress Peggy Sukmana, to assist Palestinians in the Gaza Strip. ACT sent food, medical supplies, generators, and fuel for the Palestinians.

In 2017, ACT sent thousands of tonnes of rice to Somalis that were affected by famines, along with Muslim Rohingya refugees that were residing in Bangladesh. ACT claimed that Donald Trump's commentary about recognizing Jerusalem as the capital city of Israel has increased fear, but it also resulted in more Indonesians donating to the organization.

In 2018, ACT sent 2,000 tonnes of rice to Palestine. ACT stated that the shipment is proof that Indonesia is a rich country, and more than capable to send more than just "nasi bungkus" to its friends. A similar program was also conducted in 2019.

In 2019, ACT continued its support for the Palestinians, providing clean water and medical assistance for Palestinians that were protesting for their independence. ACT supported the right of independence for the Palestinians, and promised that support from Indonesians will not subside. ACT stated that their assistance was also focused on Palestinians that were affected by airstrikes committed by the Israeli Air Force.

In 2020, ACT sent 1,000 tons of logistics to Indonesians and Indonesian Armed Forces in Natuna Islands, as a response to Chinese fishing vessels entering the Indonesia Zone of Economic Exclusivity multiple times in the South China Sea.

In 2021, an ambulance in the Gaza Strip was seen with the ACT logo in it. ACT stated that it had provided the ambulance, with assistance from the city government of Padang. The chairman of ACT, Ahyudin, claimed that Israeli soldiers have entered Palestinian homes and buildings. Ahyudin reiterated the need to take back the land of Palestine from Israeli occupation.

== Controversies ==
In 2019, ACT, along with e-commerce company Bukalapak, was accused of using donations to fund ISIS and Hizb ut-Tahrir in Syria. ACT and Bukalapak denied the accusation, claiming that the funds given to Syria were only given to refugees and other victims, and no funds were given to the Syrian government or other terrorist organizations.

In 2020, Hindustan Times reported that Indian security agencies have red-flagged ACT, as ACT had links to Falah-e-Insaniyat Foundation (FIF), the charity wing of the Pakistan-based Lashkar-e-Taiba (LeT) terrorist organization. It was raising funds for the Delhi riots. ACT denied the claim, and stated that they were only conducting humanitarian programs.

In July 2022, a report by Indonesian magazine Tempo claimed that ACT had committed massive financial mismanagement concerning donations. The report alleged that the leaders of ACT received very high salaries, with Rp. 250 million for the chairman, Rp. 150 million for the Senior Vice Presidents, Rp. 80 million for the Vice Presidents, Rp. 50 million for the executive directors, and Rp. 30 million for its directors. The report also claimed that the leadership of the organization received luxury cars. ACT claimed that the report was incorrect, as the salary numbers were temporary, but ACT agreed the numbers were correct for 2021. ACT also claimed that external auditors have found no wrongdoing in their organization.

Indonesian Financial Transaction Reports and Analysis Centre (INTRAC) stated that donations given to ACT was not being used for charity purposes, but instead being used for businesses owned by leaders of ACT. INTRAC also stated that the leaders of ACT received personal profit for the use of the donation funds. INTRAC also found that one of the recipients of the fund was affiliated with Al-Qaeda, and the recipient had been arrested in Turkey. Indonesian National Police counter-terrorism squad Densus 88 has stated that they will investigate the connection between ACT and Al-Qaeda. ACT claimed that they did not have any knowledge about the money transfer to the Al-Qaeda affiliated person. On 6 July 2022, INTRAC suspended 60 bank accounts related to ACT.

INTRAC also pointed out that there are multiple transactions to countries that have a history of funding terrorism such as Turkey, Bosnia, Albania, and India.

On 7 July 2022, the Ministry of Social Affairs of Indonesia revoked the permit for ACT after the organization was suspected to violate the laws on donation.
