= Wadas =

Coordinates: 7°37′29″S 110°05′02″E

- Village
- Interactive map of Wadas
- Country: Indonesia
- Province: Central Java
- Regency: Purworejo Regency
- District: Bener
- Postal code: 54183
- Administrative code: 33.06.16.2009

Wadas (Indonesian pronunciation: [ˈwadas]; Javanese: Wadhas) is a village located at the Bener district, Purworejo Regency, Central Java, Indonesia. The village gained attention nationally after conflicts between the inhabitants and police forces on 8 February 2022 due to the construction of Bener Dam.
