= John Pangkey =

Indonesian military officer and politician (1950–2022)

Member of the West Kalimantan Regional People's Representative Council
- In office 1999–2004

Personal details
- Born: John Richard Bartje Pangkey; 8 May 1950 Medan, United States of Indonesia
- Died: 6 June 2022 (aged 72) Pontianak, Indonesia
- Party: PPD
- Education: Indonesian Military Academy
- Occupation: Military officer

John Richard Bartje Pangkey (8 May 1950 – 6 June 2022) was an Indonesian military officer and politician. A member of the Regional Unity Party, he served in the West Kalimantan Regional People's Representative Council from 1999 to 2004.

He died in Pontianak on 6 June 2022 at the age of 72.
