= Edy Mulyadi =

Indonesian journalist

- Born: 8 January 1966 (age 60); Jakarta
- Occupation: Senior journalist for Forum News Network
- Years active: 1995–present

Edy Mulyadi (born 8 January 1966) is an Indonesian senior journalist currently active at Forum News Network (FNN), notable for criticizing Indonesia's planned new capital city, Nusantara by using inappropriate words in late January 2022. He is also currently a cadre of the Prosperous Justice Party (PKS), and he was originally elected to the 2019 Indonesian legislative election as a DPR candidate but failed for insufficient votes.

== Career ==
=== Journalism ===
Edy first started his journalist career at the newspaper Balance Daily (Indonesian: Harian Neraca), and currently listed at Indonesian Journalists Union (PWI) since 22 May 1995, but since then Edy is no longer listed at the website of the Press Council, according to the head of PWI branch in Depok, Rusdy Nurdiansyah. He is also a writer at Kompasiana since 2014.

At unknown time, he joined FNN which was founded by former Republika reporters and journalists led by Hersubeno Arif. FNN itself is an alt-media news site for pro-opposition Indonesians and opposing Joko Widodo administration policies in their reports while praising Islamic fundamentalism and their acts, including the currently banned Islamic Defenders Front and their figures in another side. FNN was notorious for its questionable reportings. Some of FNN bogus reporting are including spreading a series of fake news on finance situation in Indonesia in apparent attempt to smear national economy policies and inciting distrust and spreading false report on, later identified as hoax, on medical status of Megawati Soekarnoputri. The FNN status itself was unverified as in 2020 and 2021 by Indonesian Press Council. During his time in FNN, he made questionable stories and claims about Islamic Defenders Front followers that were shot dead by the police.

=== Others ===
He is also currently owning a YouTube channel named Bang Edy Channel. The account confiscated following his arrest by police, but yet to taken down. The content of his channel mostly contains critics to Joko Widodo government. It also contain demagogic contents such as divisive materials, strong words, and materials inciting hostilities against particular tribes and races.

== Criticism of the new capital city ==
On 23 January 2022, Edy in a Twitter video criticizes the move to the new capital city of Nusantara while using inappropriate words:

Could you understand? This is a highly-priced place for elites, their own buildings were later sold and moved to the place where jinns (demons) are throwing away the children...
...Where are the markets? If the markets were (crowded) by kuntilanaks and genderuwos, so why I come to build there?

— Edy Mulyadi

Additionally, an advocate Azam Khan sitting next to Edy responded "only monkeys (want to live there)" while hearing Edy's speech that no one buying a new house in Gunung Sari, Penajam North Paser Regency.

...No one wanted to live at Gunung Sari, Penajam, after moving to Kalimantan to buy a house there. "I don't want to be a resident of the new capital!"

— Edy Mulyadi

As a response, numerous mass organizations in South and East Kalimantan reported Edy to the police for offending Kalimantan inhabitants. Tifatul Sembiring, a PKS politician, originally supported Edy, but later apologized it and withdrew the support. In 31 January, Edy stated again an apology of his case at the Bareskrim Polri building in Jakarta, after the previous one in 24 January; and later he was arrested by the police that day. Edy stated in a YouTube video that he was targeted by people before being arrested, and he also said that "I will surrender to Allah".
