= Aangan =

Aangan may also refer to:

- Aangan (novel), an Urdu-language novel by Khadija Mastoor
- Aangan (1973 film), an Indian Hindi-language family drama film by Nasir Hussain, starring Deb Mukherjee, Farida Jalal, Ashim Kumar and Indrani Mukherjee
- Aangan (1982 film), a Pakistani Urdu-language film directed by Nazar-ul-Islam, starring Nadeem, Babra Sharif and Sajjad Kishwar
- Aangan (2017 TV series), a Pakistani ARY Digital television series, written by Faiza Iftikhar
- Aangan (2018 TV series), a Pakistani Hum TV series, based on Khadija Mastoor's novel
- Aangan, a 2018 Indian Urdu-language TV series aired on DD Urdu, based on Khadija Mastoor's novel
- Aangan – Aapno Kaa, a 2023 Indian Hindi-language TV drama series aired on Sony SAB

== See also ==
- Angan Ke Par Dwar, a 1961 Hindi-language poetry collection by Indian writer Agyeya
- Aangan Ki Kali, a 1979 Indian Hindi-language drama film about adoption by Harsh Kohli, starring Rakesh Roshan and Lakshmi
- Aangan Ke Laxmi, a 2023 Indian Bhojpuri-language film by Tejesh Akhouri
- Angan languages or Ongan languages, Andamanese languages spoken in the Andaman Islands, India
