= Abdul Sajid Tamrin =

Indonesian politician (1952–2022)

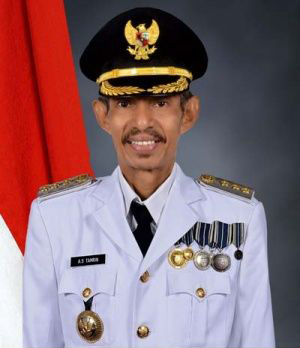
- Tamrin in 2017

Mayor of Baubau
- In office 30 January 2013 – 13 January 2022
- Preceded by: Amirul Tamim
- Succeeded by: La Ode Ahmad Monianse

Personal details
- Born: 20 November 1952 Buton Regency, Indonesia
- Died: 13 January 2022 (aged 69) Jakarta, Indonesia
- Party: PAN

Abdul Sajid Tamrin (20 November 1952 – 13 January 2022) was an Indonesian politician. A member of the National Mandate Party, he served as mayor of Baubau from 2013 to 2022. He died in Jakarta on 13 January 2022, at the age of 69.
