= Ridwan Saidi =

Indonesian writer and politician (1942–2022)

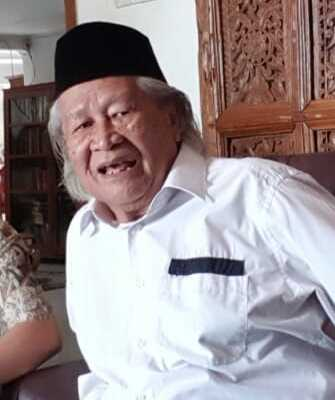

Member of the People's Representative Council
- In office 1 October 1977 – 30 September 1987

Chairman of the Executive Board of the Muslim Students' Association of Indonesia
- In office 1974–1976
- Preceded by: Akbar Tandjung
- Succeeded by: Chumaidi Syarif Romas

Personal details
- Born: 2 July 1942 Jakarta, Japanese-occupied Dutch East Indies
- Died: 25 December 2022 (aged 80) South Tangerang, Indonesia
- Party: PPP
- Education: University of Indonesia
- Occupation: Writer

Ridwan Saidi (2 July 1942 – 25 December 2022) was an Indonesian writer and politician. A member of the United Development Party, he served in the People's Representative Council from 1977 to 1987.

Saidi died in South Tangerang on 25 December 2022, at the age of 80.
