= 2022 Alfamart Gambut collapse =

Building collapse in Indonesia

- Date: 18 April 2022
- Location: Gambut District, Banjar Regency, South Kalimantan, Indonesia
- Type: Building collapse
- Deaths: 5
- Injuries: 9

On 18 April 2022 16:45 Central Indonesian Time, a three-storey building which included an Alfamart convenience store collapsed in Gambut district, Banjar Regency, South Kalimantan. As of 21 April 2022, the collapse resulted in 14 casualties including five deaths and search was still conducted by police and rescuers.

== Reaction ==
BPJS Ketenagakerjaan, mandatory insurance for workers in Indonesia awarded compensations to all the victims in the collapse which includes 48 times the amount of monthly salary for fatal casualties to the victim's families. Alfamart's Banjarmasin branch which managed stores across South Kalimantan said that they will pay all the medical expense in addition of compensations to all victims of the collapse as well. Experts from the police, the Ministry of Public Works and Housing, and Lambung Mangkurat University have started an investigation regarding the cause of the collapse.
