= Aang Hamid Suganda =

Indonesian politician (1942–2022)

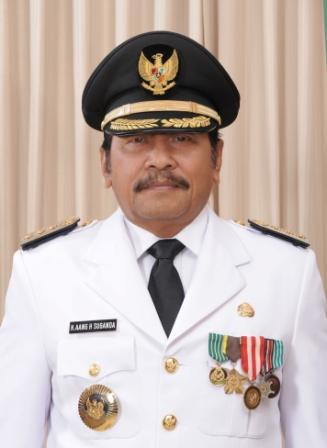

Regent of Kuningan Regency
- In office 4 December 2003 – 4 December 2013
- Preceded by: Arifin Setiamihardja
- Succeeded by: Utje Hamid Suganda

Personal details
- Born: 15 December 1942 Kuningan Regency, Japanese-occupied Dutch East Indies
- Died: 20 June 2022 (aged 79) Jakarta, Indonesia
- Party: PDI-P
- Education: Indonesia University of Education

Aang Hamid Suganda (15 December 1942 – 20 June 2022) was an Indonesian politician. A member of the Indonesian Democratic Party of Struggle, he served as regent of Kuningan from 2003 to 2013.

Suganda died in Jakarta on 20 June 2022 at the age of 79.
