= Ridwan Suwidi =

Indonesian politician

Ridwan Suwidi (born in Tanah Grogot, 21 April 1936–died in Tanah Grogot, 25 September 2022) is an Indonesian politician. He served as Regent of Paser for 2 periods, 2005–2010 and 2010–2015. He has served as Member of the East Kalimantan DPRD PPP Faction for 4 periods, 1987–1992, 1992–1997, 1997–1999 and 1999–2004.
