= Harimurti Kridalaksana =

Indonesian linguist (1939–2022)

Harimurti Kridalaksana (December 23, 1939 in Ungaran – July 11, 2022) was an Indonesian linguist. He has authored dictionaries and other publications in the field of Indonesian linguistics.

In 1963, he graduated from the University of Indonesia, receiving his M.A. degree. Then he undertook postgraduate studies in the field of language didactics at the University of Pittsburgh (1971), where he was nominated for Fulbright Scholar. In 1973, he was a visiting lecturer at the University of Michigan. In 1985, he was awarded the Humboldt Fellow prize. He was also a researcher and a lecturer at the Johann Wolfgang Goethe University in Frankfurt am Main. He obtained his doctorate in 1987 at the University of Indonesia.

He is the author of over 100 academic articles and over 20 books in the field of linguistics. He has also covered sociolinguistic issues. He was a member of scientific organizations, such as: Linguistic Society of America, Masyarakat Linguistik Indonesia, International Association of Cognitive Linguistics.

== Selected bibliography ==
- Kamus sinonim bahasa Indonesia (1977)
- Kamus Linguistik (1982)
- Rintisan dalam linguistik Indonesia kumpulan karangan (1984)
- Tatabahasa deskriptif bahasa Indonesia: sintaksis (1985)
- Kelas kata dalam bahasa Indonesia (1986)
- Beberapa prinsip perpaduan leksem dalam bahasa Indonesia (1987)
- Pembentukan kata dalam bahasa Indonesia (1989)
- Masa lampau bahasa Indonesia: sebuah bunga rampai (1991)
