= 2026 in Indonesia =

- Centuries: 20th; 21st
- Decades: 2000s; 2010s; 2020s
- See also: History of Indonesia; Timeline of Indonesian history; List of years in Indonesia

2026 (MMXXVI) is the current year, and is a common year starting on Thursday of the Gregorian calendar, the 2026th year of the Common Era (CE) and Anno Domini (AD) designations, the 26th year of the 3rd millennium and the 21st century, and the 7th year of the 2020s decade.

== Incumbents ==
=== Central government ===
- President: Prabowo Subianto (Gerindra)
- Vice President: Gibran Rakabuming Raka (independent)
- Speaker of the MPR: Ahmad Muzani (Gerindra)
- Speaker of the DPR: Puan Maharani (PDI-P)
- Speaker of the DPD: Sultan Bachtiar Najamudin (Bengkulu)

Prabowo
Subianto

Gibran
Rakabuming

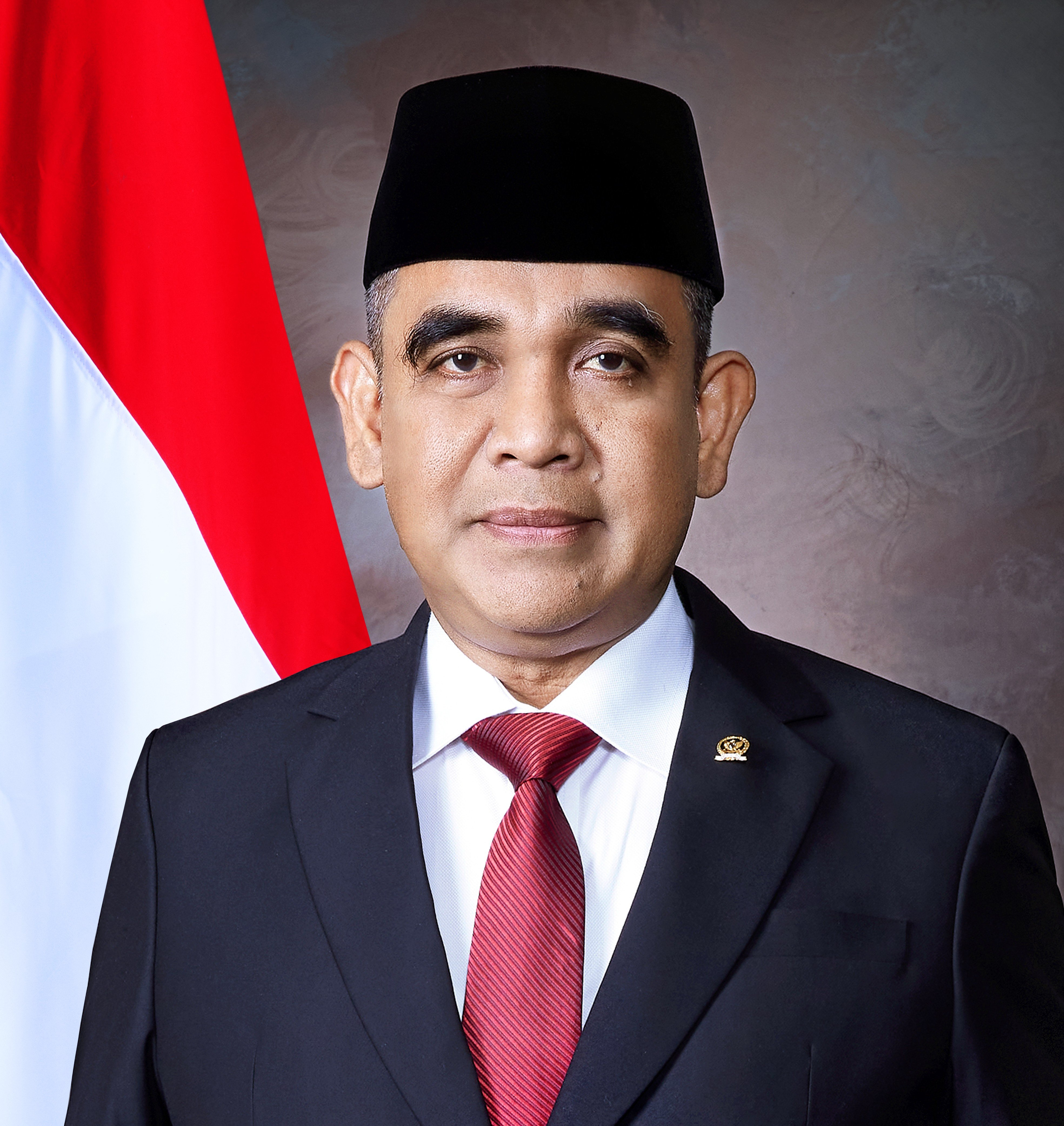
Ahmad
Muzani

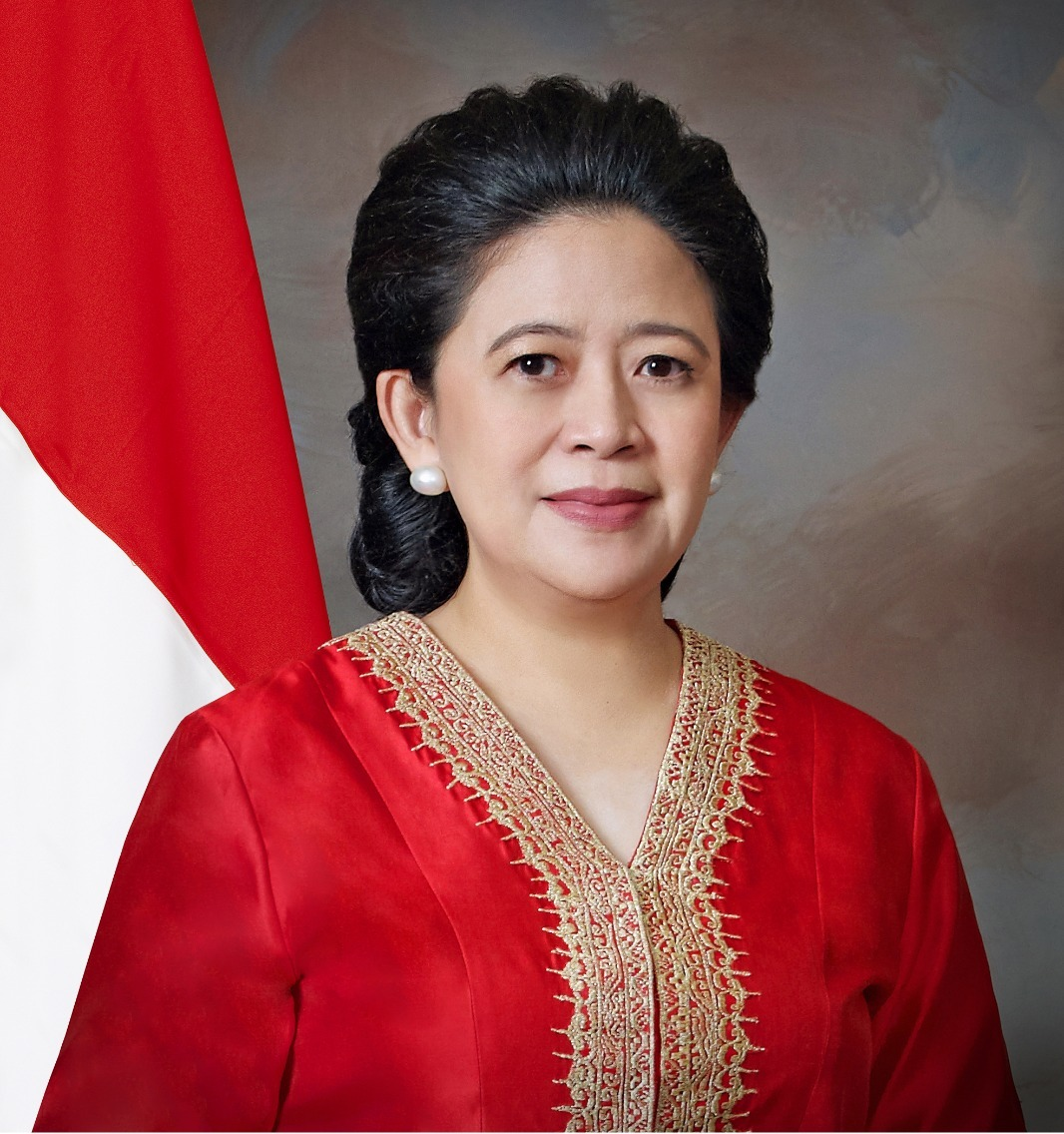
Puan
Maharani

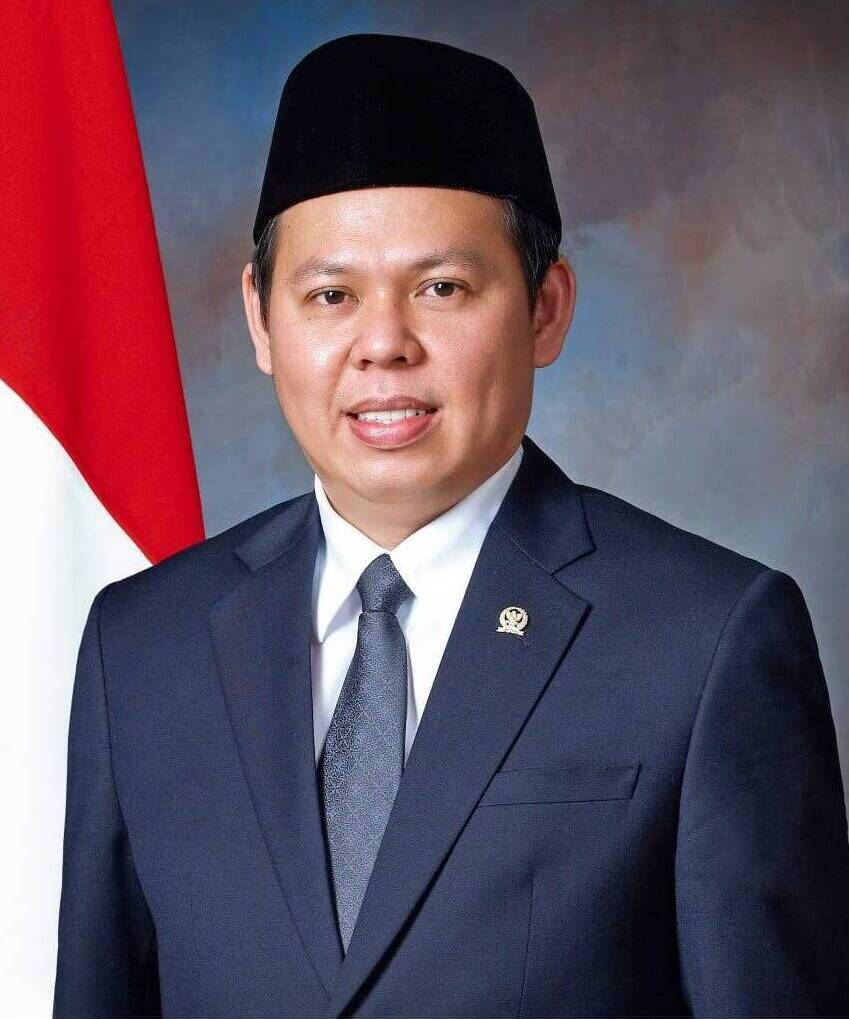
Sultan
Najamudin

Governors

=== Governors ===
- Aceh: Muzakir Manaf (Aceh) (starting 7 February)
- North Sumatra: Bobby Nasution (Gerindra) (starting 7 February)
- West Sumatra: Mahyeldi Ansharullah (PKS)
- Riau: Abdul Wahid (PKB) (starting 7 February)
- Riau Islands: Ansar Ahmad (Golkar)
- Jambi: Al Haris (PAN)
- South Sumatra: Herman Deru (NasDem) (starting 7 February)
- Bengkulu: Helmi Hasan (PAN) (starting 7 February)
- Bangka Belitung Islands: Hidayat Arsani (Golkar) (starting 7 February)
- Lampung: Rahmat Mirzani Djausal (Gerindra) (starting 7 February)
- Banten: Andra Soni (Gerindra) (starting 7 February)
- Jakarta: Pramono Anung (PDI-P) (starting 7 February)
- West Java: Dedi Mulyadi (Gerindra) (starting 7 February)
- Central Java: Ahmad Luthfi (Gerindra) (starting 7 February)
- Yogyakarta: Hamengkubuwana X (independent)
- East Java: Khofifah Indar Parawansa (PKB) (starting 7 February)
- Bali: I Wayan Koster (PDI-P) (starting 7 February)
- West Nusa Tenggara: Lalu Muhamad Iqbal (independent) (starting 7 February)
- East Nusa Tenggara: Emanuel Melkiades Laka Lena (Golkar) (starting 7 February)
- West Kalimantan: Ria Norsan (PDI-P) (starting 7 February)
- Central Kalimantan:
  - Sugianto Sabran (PDI-P) (until 7 February)
  - Agustiar Sabran (Gerindra) (starting 7 February)
- South Kalimantan: Muhidin (PAN)
- East Kalimantan: Rudy Mas'ud (Golkar) (starting 7 February)
- North Kalimantan: Zainal Arifin Paliwang (Gerindra)
- West Sulawesi: Suhardi Duka (Demokrat) (starting 7 February)
- South Sulawesi: Andi Sudirman Sulaiman (Gerindra) (starting 7 February)
- Southeast Sulawesi: Andi Sumangerukka (PPP) (starting 7 February)
- Central Sulawesi:
  - Rusdy Mastura (Gerindra) (until 7 February)
  - Anwar Hafid (Demokrat) (starting 7 February)
- Gorontalo: Gusnar Ismail (Demokrat) (starting 7 February)
- North Sulawesi:
  - Olly Dondokambey (PDI-P) (until 7 February)
  - Yulius Selvanus (Gerindra) (starting 7 February)
- Maluku: Hendrik Lewerissa (Gerindra) (starting 7 February)
- North Maluku: Sherly Tjoanda (Demokrat) (starting 7 February)
- Southwest Papua: Elisa Kambu (independent) (starting 7 February)
- West Papua: Dominggus Mandacan (NasDem) (starting 7 February)
- Central Papua: Meki Fritz Nawipa (PDI-P) (starting 7 February)
- South Papua: Apolo Safanpo (independent) (starting 7 February)
- Highland Papua: John Tabo (Golkar) (starting 7 February)
- Papua: Mathius Fakhiri (Golkar) (starting 8 October)

== Events ==
=== January ===
- 1 January – Around 40 homes are affected by flash flooding due to the overflowing Muaro Pisang River in the village of Maninjau, Agam Regency, West Sumatra, displacing 200 people.
- 2 January
  - The 2023 Indonesian Penal Code comes into effect, replacing the previous one dating from the Dutch colonial era.
  - Residents of Apara and Longgar villages in the Aru Islands, Maluku, are involved in clashes triggered by alcohol (sopi), leaving two people dead and nine others injured.
- 5 January – At least 16 people are killed in flash floods in Siau Tagulandang Biaro Islands Regency, North Sulawesi.
- 10 January
  - Former Minister of Religious Affairs Yaqut Cholil Qoumas, together with his former special staff Ishfah Abidal Aziz and Maktour owner Fuad Hasan Masyhur, are designated by the Corruption Eradication Commission as suspects of the Hajj quota corruption scandal.
  - The government blocks access to Grok AI over its usage in generating sexualised images of women and children. The block is lifted on 1 February, following assurances by parent firm X Corp.
- 11 January – A magnitude 6.4 earthquake hits North Sulawesi, damaging 14 structures in Talaud Islands Regency.
- 17 January – An ATR 42-500 operated by Indonesia Air Transport flying from Yogyakarta to Makassar crashes in Maros Regency in South Sulawesi, killing all 10 people on board.
- 19 January – One person is killed in a tribal war between the Lani and the Yali near the Wio Silimo Cross Monument in Wamena, Highland Papua.
- 22 January – Indonesia joins the Board of Peace.
- 24 January
  - At least 74 people are killed in a landslide in the village of Pasir Langu in West Bandung Regency, West Java.
  - Heavy rain damages upstream areas and causes flash floods in five regencies of Central Java.
- 27 January – A Smart Air Cessna 208B Grand Caravan, PK-SNS, crash-lands on a beach in Nabire Regency, Central Papua shortly after takeoff from Douw Aturure Airport. All 13 occupants survive.
- 27 January-7 February – 2026 AFC Futsal Asian Cup

=== February ===
- 5 February – A magnitude 5.8 earthquake hits East Java, killing one person and injuring 47 others.
- 6 February – Australia and Indonesia sign a bilateral security agreement.
- 19 February – The United States and Indonesia reach an agreement to reduce tariffs between the two countries.

=== March ===
- 6 March – The government issues regulations barring children under 16 years of age from social media platforms effective 28 March.
- 8 March – Seven people are killed in a garbage landslide at the Bantargebang Integrated Waste Treatment Facility in Bekasi.
- 9 March – A court in Denpasar sentences three Australian nationals to up to 16 years' imprisonment for the contract killing of another Australian national, Zivan Radmanovic, in Badung in 2025.
- 12 March – Human rights activist Andrie Yunus is injured in an acid attack in Jakarta. Four soldiers are subsequently arrested on suspicion of involvement.
- 25 March-31 March – 2026 FIFA Series (men's matches)

=== April ===
- 2 April
  - 2026 North Maluku earthquake: One person is killed and another is injured when a building in Manado collapses following a 7.4-magnitude earthquake that hits off Maluku.
  - A fire at the LPG bulk filling station (SPBE) in Mustika Jaya District, Bekasi injures 14 people and damages several homes.
- 8 April – A magnitude 4.9 earthquake hits East Nusa Tenggara, injuring 18 people.
- 16 April –
  - The University of Indonesia suspends 16 law students pending investigation after messages containing explicit remarks about female peers circulated online and prompted public criticism.
  - An Airbus H130 helicopter operated by PT Matthew Air Nusantara crashes in Sekadau Regency shortly after takeoff from Melawi Regency in West Kalimantan on its way to Kubu Raya Regency, killing all eight people on board.
- 20 April – Eni announces the discovery of a natural gas field off the coast of East Kalimantan with potential reserves of about 5,000,000,000,000 ft^{3} (1.4×10^{11} m^{3}) of gas and 300 million barrels of natural-gas condensate.
- 21 April – Protests against East Kalimantan governor Rudy Mas'ud begin in Samarinda.
- 27 April – 2026 Bekasi train crash: A KRL Commuterline train is rear-ended by an Argo Bromo Anggrek train at Bekasi Timur Station in Bekasi, killing 15 people and injuring 84.

=== May ===
- 1 May – The Argo Bromo Anggrek train collides with a car transporting Hajj pilgrims in Grobogan, Central Java, killing four people.
- 6 May – A bus collides with an oil tanker in North Musi Rawas Regency, South Sumatra, killing 16 people and injuring four others.
- 8 May – The Dukono volcano erupts in North Maluku, killing three climbers.
- 9 May – A police raid on a commercial building in Jakarta results in the arrest of 321 foreign nationals on suspicion of involvement in illegal online gambling.
- 22 May – 2026 Sumatra blackout: A power outage caused by a fault in a 275kV transmission line hits North Sumatra and Central Sumatra, leaving millions without electricity.

=== June ===
- 1 June – Five people are killed in a suspected World War II ordnance explosion in a fishing village in Papua province.
- 2 June – President Prabowo dismisses Dadan Hindayana as head of the National Nutrition Agency amid criticism over food poisonings related to the Free Nutritious Meals program. Hindayana is arrested the next day along with two of his deputies.
- 4 June – The rupiah reaches its lowest level against the US dollar with a ratio of to Rp 18,028 to $1.
- 8 June – A magnitude 7.8 earthquake with an epicenter off the coast of the neighboring Philippines hits North Sulawesi, injuring three people.
- 10 June – A court martial convicts four officers of the Indonesian Strategic Intelligence Agency for the acid attack on human rights activist Andrie Yunus in March and sentences them to three years' imprisonment.
- 12 June – Hundreds of students demonstrate against president Prabowo in response to a fuel price hike and mismanaged government spending on the Free Nutritious Meals program.
- 16 June — A magnitude 6.7 earthquake hits Central Sulawesi, killing three people.
- 30 June —
  - An anti-corruption court in Jakarta convicts former education minister Nadiem Makarim of corruption over the Chromebook procurement scandal and sentences him to 10 years' imprisonment.
  - A fire erupts at the Jatiwaringin landfill in Jakarta, affecting 15 ha (37 acres) by 8 July.

=== July ===
- 1 July — An explosion and fire occur at a herbal processing plant in the Candi Industrial Park in Semarang, killing one worker and injuring seven others. The blast is believed to have been caused by a malfunctioning sterilization tube due to excessive temperature and pressure.
- 2 July — The West Papua National Liberation Army sets an airplane on fire and kills its American pilot after it lands in Yahukimo Regency, Highland Papua.
- 8 July — Police perform raids on 12 locations linked to three different corruption cases. One of the case is coal procurement graft, which is linked to the 2026 Sumatra blackout. They recover 74 kg (163 lb) of gold and cash in form of Indonesian rupiah, Singapore dollar, and United States dollar totaling over Rp. 67 billion (USD 3.7 million).
- 12 July — A magnitude 5.1 earthquake hits Central Sulawesi, killing one person.
- 14 July — A student at a school in Padang detonates a low-explosive homemade bomb in a classroom. No casualties are reported, but the student, who claimed to have been motivated by bullying, is taken into police custody.
- 15 July — The passenger vessel KM Nurul Salsa sinks off the coast of Selayar Islands, South Sulawesi, after suffering engine failure. At least one person is confirmed dead, 49 are rescued, and 24 passengers and crew are reported missing.
- 16 July — An explosion occurs at a TNI ammunition depot in Madiun during routine maintenance and inspection, killing one soldier and injuring six others.
- 24 July – The United States imposes a 10% tariff on Indonesia, citing the presence of alleged forced labor in the supply chain.
- 26 July — Perry Warjiyo resigns as Governor of Bank Indonesia, citing personal reasons. Senior Deputy Governor Destry Damayanti is appointed as Acting Governor in accordance.
- 31 July – Authorities arrest a Malaysia Airlines pilot for allegedly smuggling 26 kg (57 lb) of ecstasy and a package of methamphetamine into Soekarno-Hatta International Airport in Jakarta.

=== August ===
- 1 August — State-owned oil company Pertamina adjusts the prices of several non-subsidised fuels, citing a decline in global crude oil prices and exchange rate fluctuations.
- 2 August — KMP Mutiara Sentosa 2, a ferry carrying 271 passengers and crew, catches fire off the Sapudi Islands en route from Surabaya to Makassar, leaving five dead and 41 missing.
- 6 August – Authorities seize 1.3 tonnes of ketamine valued at 2.07 trillion rupiah (S$149 million) from the Tanzanian-flagged vessel MV King Sun, which originated from Thailand and was intercepted off the Riau Islands.
- 12 August – The ferry Putri Yasmin catches fire in the Lombok Strait, killing one person.
- 15 August – A magnitude 7.7 earthquake hits Flores, killing 136 people.
- 16 August – A magnitude 5.9 earthquake hits Central Sulawesi, killing one person.
- 17 August – Nine women are abducted by gunmen in Mimika Regency, Central Papua.
- 18 August –
  - Three volcanoes (Ibu, Lewotobi Laki-laki, and Semeru) erupt within a span of three hours.
  - A hiker dies after falling into the crater of Mount Slamet in Central Java.

=== September ===
- 4 September –
  - The Anak Krakatau volcano erupts, causing major flight disruptions in Jakarta.
  - A state of emergency is declared in Banyuwangi Regency due to a wildfire in the Ijen protected area.
- 5 September – Three people are killed in a collapse at an illegal gold mine in Sumbawa Regency, West Nusa Tenggara.
- 7 September –
  - Eleven people are killed in a fire at a market in Paniai Regency, Central Papua.
  - A speedboat carrying five journalists covering the eruption of Anak Krakatau goes missing in the Sunda Strait along with its eight passengers.
- 13 September – The passenger ferry Virgo Transport 8, carrying 243 passengers, capsizes in the Java Sea while sailing from Surabaya to Banjarmasin, leaving six dead and 130 missing.
- 14 September – President Prabowo appoints Suahasil Nazara as finance minister, succeeding Purbaya Yudhi Sadewa.
- 19 September – 4 October – Indonesia at the 2026 Asian Games in Aichi Prefecture and Nagoya, Japan.
- 21 September – A flash flood hits Solok Regency in West Sumatra, killing two people and injuring four others. The disaster displaces around 480 residents and damages 98 homes and 12 government buildings.
- 24 September - 5 October - 2026 FIFA ASEAN Cup

=== October ===
- 1 October – The People's Representative Council approves the appointment of Suyudi Ario Seto as Chief of the Indonesian National Police, succeeding Listyo Sigit Prabowo.
- 3 October – A magnitude 5.9 earthquake hits East Nusa Tenggara, killing one person.
- 5 October – Indonesia wins the 2026 FIFA ASEAN Cup final after defeating Thailand in a penalty shoot-out at the Gelora Bung Karno Stadium in Jakarta.
- 10 October – A flash flood hits Padang, West Sumatra, affecting 498 people and submerging over 120 houses.
- 11 October – 2026 Indonesian motorcycle Grand Prix
- 15 October – The government announces a strengthening of leadership in disaster management and peatland restoration to address widespread fires and the impact of transboundary haze.
- 16 October – The IDX Composite suffers its worst one-day drop since January 1998, namely by 11.57% to 5,185.11.
- 21 October – Indonesia, Pakistan, Turkey, and Qatar sign the Badr defense agreement.
- 30 October – Google published report of closing over 19.000 pro-governments YouTube accounts for media manipulation.

=== November ===
- 3 November – Three senior police generals, namely Listyo Sigit Prabowo and Inspector Generals Ahrie Sonta Nasution and Eko Hadi Santoso, are arrested for allegedly wiretapping president Prabowo's phone.
- 4 November –
  - One person is killed while 13 are injured during Mawlid celebrations in Aceh after soldiers open fire while trying to remove a flag associated with the Free Aceh Movement.
  - An Mi-17V5 helicopter of the Indonesian Army crashes off Sungai Perlu Village, Seruyan Regency, Central Kalimantan, during a forest firefighting mission near Tanjung Puting National Park. Three of the eight personnel on board are killed and five others are injured.
- 8 November – An Super Puma H-225 helicopter crashes in South Kalimantan during a forest firefighting mission, killing one person.
- 10 November –
  - Vice president Gibran Rakabuming Raka announces his intention to resign following controversies about his high-school diploma.
  - Police detain 154 people following clashes with protesters in Yogyakarta. The Yogyakarta Legal Aid Institute reports that two people are hospitalized and 13 others remain missing.
- 19 November – The House of Representatives passes the Asset Forfeiture Bill into law, allowing asset seizure without a criminal conviction.
- 21 November – Three people are killed in a fire at a confectionary factory in Serang Regency, Banten.

== Holidays ==
- 1 January — New Year's Day
- 16 January — Isra' and Mi'raj
- 17 February — Chinese New Year
- 19 March — Day of Silence
- 21–22 March — Lebaran
- 3 April — Good Friday
- 5 April — Easter
- 1 May — International Workers' Day
- 14 May — Ascension Day
- 27 May — Eid al-Adha
- 31 May — Vesak Day
- 1 June — Pancasila Day
- 16 June — Islamic New Year
- 17 August — Independence Day
- 25 August — Prophet's Birthday
- 25 December — Christmas Day

== Deaths ==
- 3 January — Amal Fathullah Zarkasyi, 76, academic and Islamic scholar
- 8 January — Jafar Nainggolan, 79, MP (2009–2014)
- 25 January — Dede Sulaeman, 69, footballer
- 31 January – Salim Sayyid Mengga, 74, military officer, vice governor of West Sulawesi (since 2025), member of the House of Representatives (2009–2016)
- 7 February – Benny Indra Ardhianto, 33, politician and businessman, Vice Regent of Klaten (since 2025)
- 8 February – Agus Widjojo, 78, politician and diplomat, Indonesian ambassador to the Philippines (since 2022)
- 1 March – Margaret Aliyatul Maimunah, 47, women's activist
- 2 March – Try Sutrisno, 90, vice president (1993–1998), commander of the Armed Forces (1988–1993), and chief of staff (1986–1988)
- 7 March – Vidi Aldiano, 35, singer-songwriter
- 19 March – Michael Bambang Hartono, 86, banker, electronics and cigarettes industry executive, and bridge player, founder of Polytron and co-owner of Djarum (since 1963)
- 28 March – Juwono Sudarsono, 84, ambassador to the United Kingdom (2003–2004), minister of education (1998–1999) and twice of defense
- 8 May – Haerul Saleh, 44, MP (2014–2019, 2020–2022)
- 31 May – Ryamizard Ryacudu, 76, minister of defence (2014–2019) and chief of staff (2002–2005)
- 4 June – Antonius Agus Sriyono, 69, diplomat.
- 13 June –
  - Zaini Abdullah, 86, politician, governor of Aceh (2012–2017).
  - Waldi Murad, 75, vice admiral, vice chief of staff of the Navy (2006–2007).
- 18 June – Achmad Sutjipto, 80, admiral, chief of staff of the Navy (1999–2000).
- 10 July – Rachmad Gobel, 63, minister of trade (2014–2015).
- 6 September – Rudy Ariffin, 73, governor of South Kalimantan (2005–2015) and regent of Banjar (2000–2005).
- 19 September – Danny Setiawan, 81, governor of West Java (2003–2008).
- 26 September – Guruh Sukarnoputra, 73, artist, MP (1999–2024).
- 14 October – Martha Tilaar, 89, cosmetics entrepreneur and founder of the Martha Tilaar Group.
- 16 October – Yadi Timo, 66, actor.
- 24 October – Widodo Adi Sutjipto, 82, coordinating minister for political and security affairs (2004–2009), commander of the National Armed Forces (1999–2002), and chief of staff of the Navy (1998–1999).
- 27 October – Gandung Pardiman, 73, member of the House of Representatives (2009–2014, since 2018).
- 9 November – Badrul Kamal, 80, Mayor of Depok (2000–2005).
- 12 November – Aloysius Murwito, 75, Roman Catholic prelate, bishop of Agats (since 2002).
