= 2024 in Indonesia =

- Centuries: 20th; 21st
- Decades: 2000s; 2010s; 2020s
- See also: History of Indonesia; Timeline of Indonesian history; List of years in Indonesia

2024 (MMXXIV) was a leap year starting on Monday of the Gregorian calendar, the 2024th year of the Common Era (CE) and Anno Domini (AD) designations, the 24th year of the 3rd millennium and the 21st century, and the 5th year of the 2020s decade.

== Incumbents ==
- President:
  - Joko Widodo (PDI-P, independent by 22 April) (until 20 October)
  - Prabowo Subianto (Gerindra) (since 20 October)
- Vice President:
  - Ma'ruf Amin (independent) (until 20 October)
  - Gibran Rakabuming Raka (independent) (since 20 October)
- Speaker of the MPR:
  - Bambang Soesatyo (Golkar) (until 3 October)
  - Ahmad Muzani (Gerindra) (since 3 October)
- Speaker of the DPR: Puan Maharani (PDI-P)
- Speaker of the DPD:
  - La Nyalla Mattalitti (East Java) (until 2 October)
  - Sultan Bachtiar Najamudin (Bengkulu) (since 2 October)

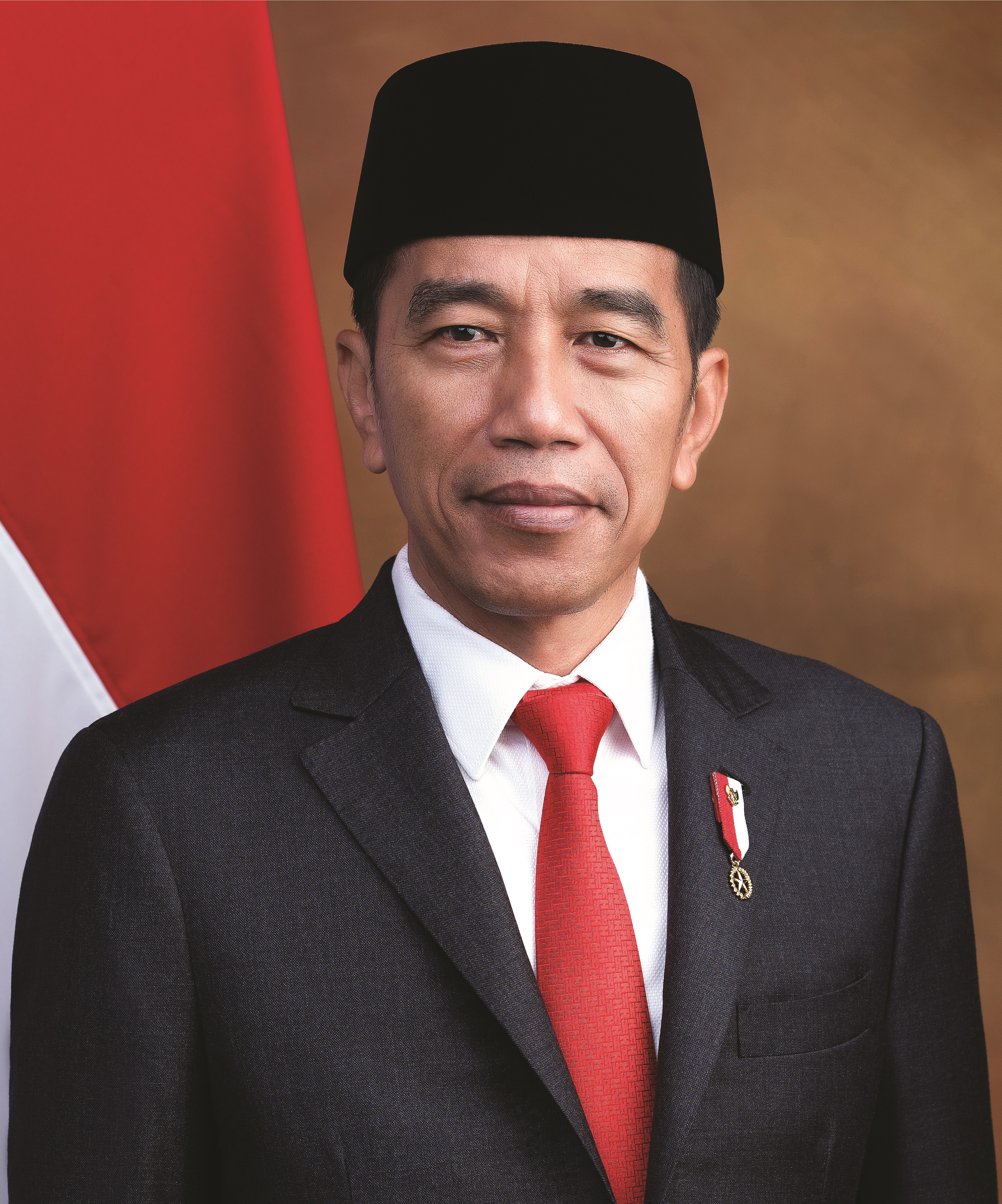
Joko
Widodo

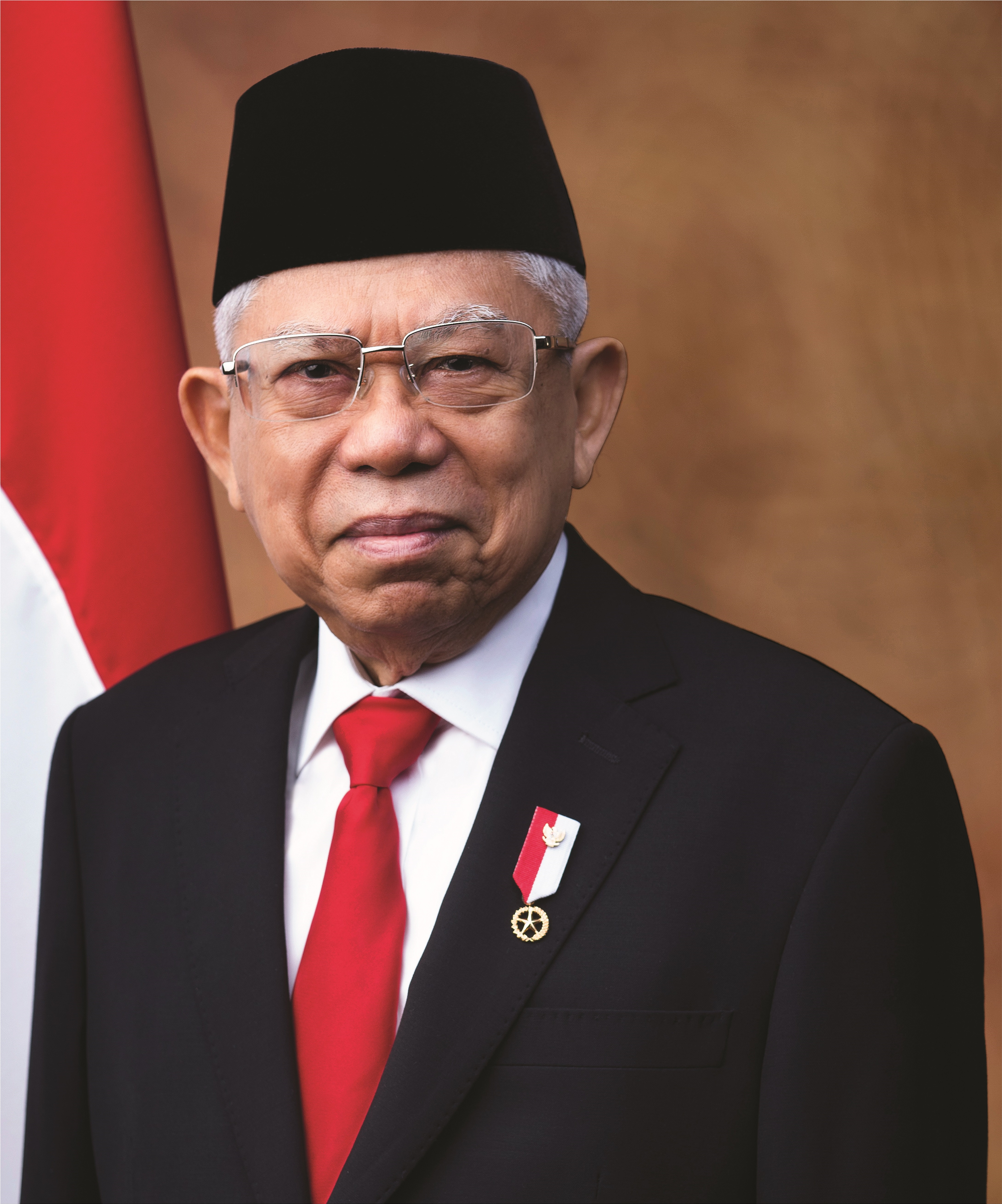
Ma'ruf
Amin

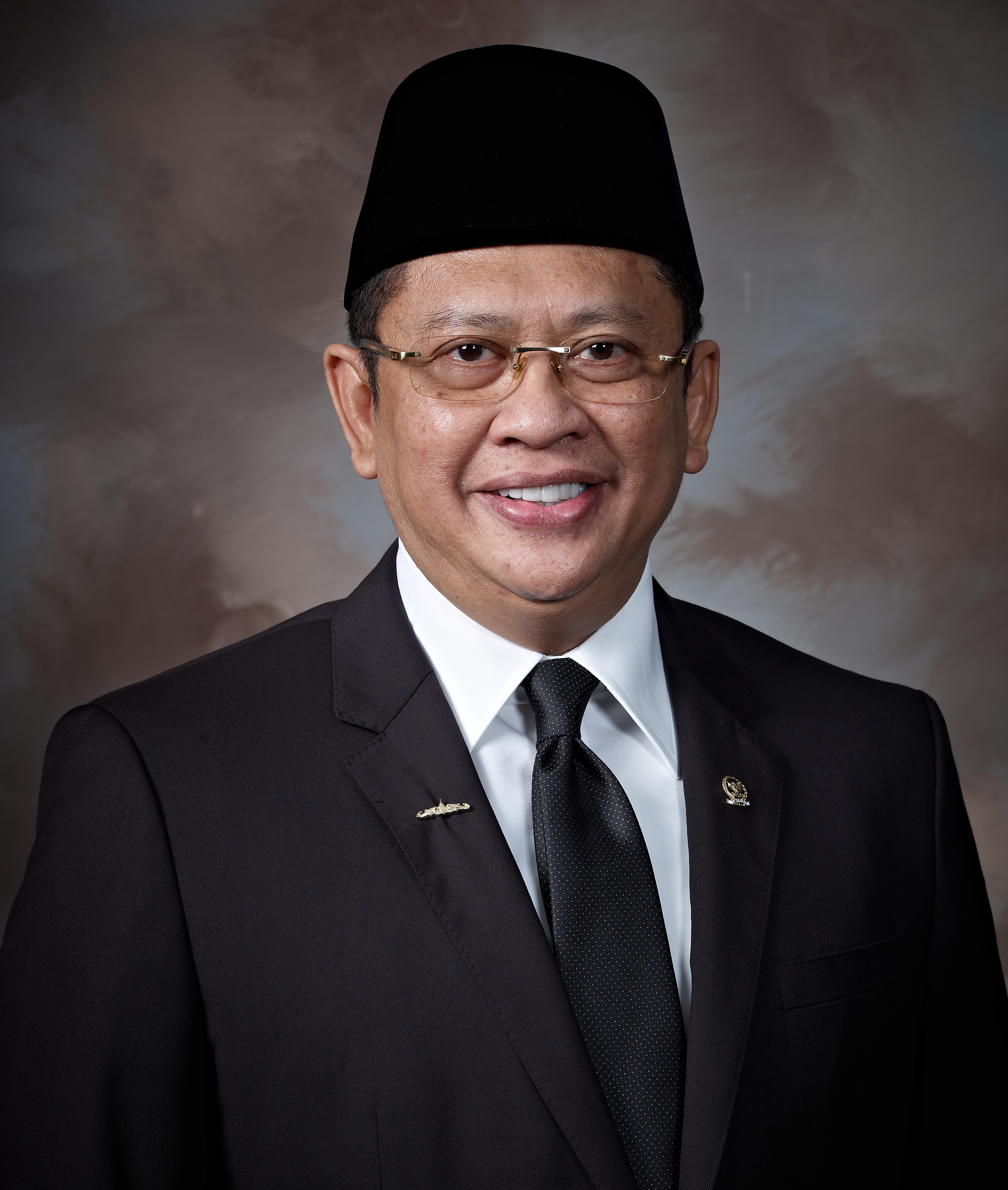
Bambang
Soesatyo

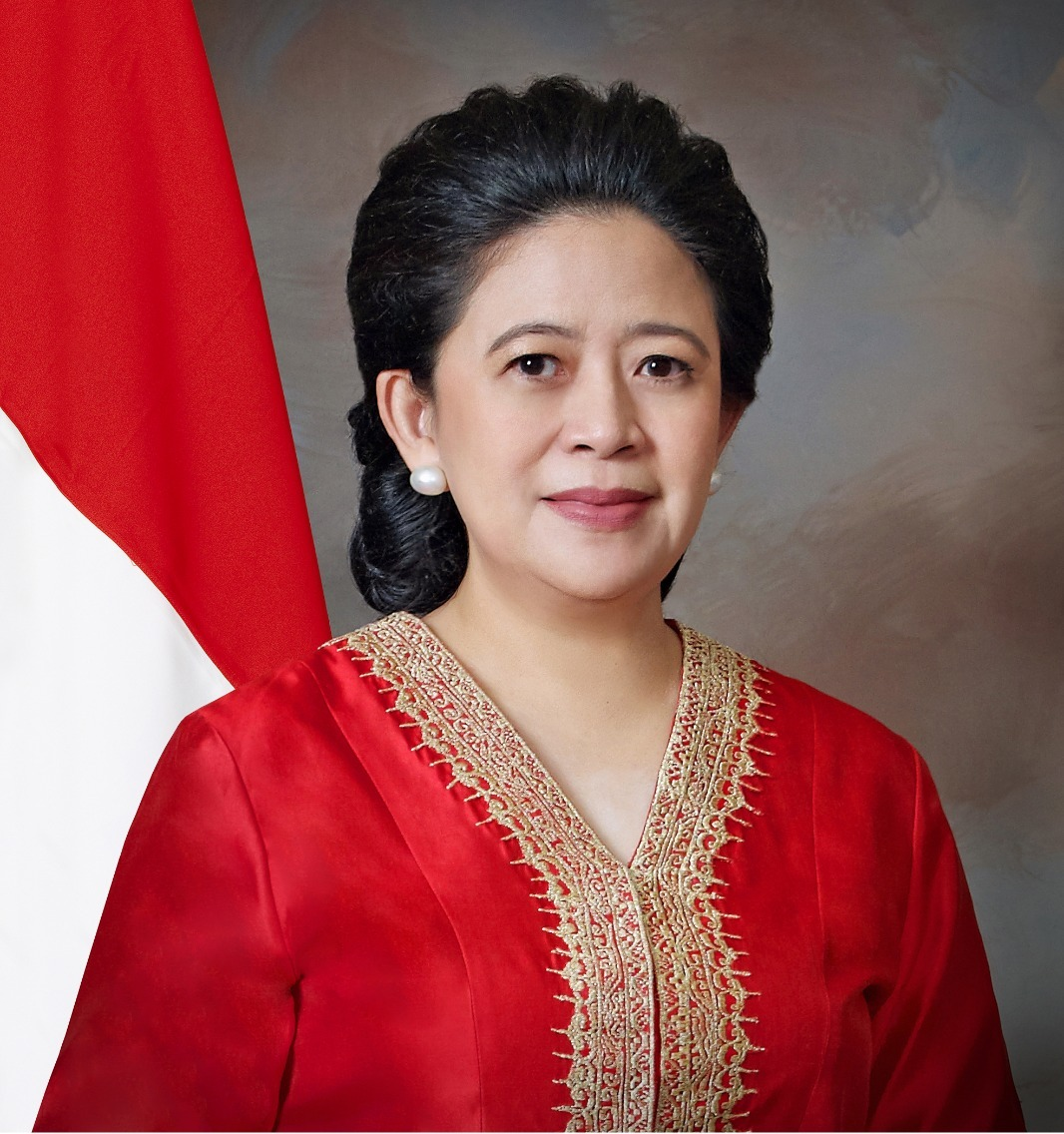
Puan
Maharani

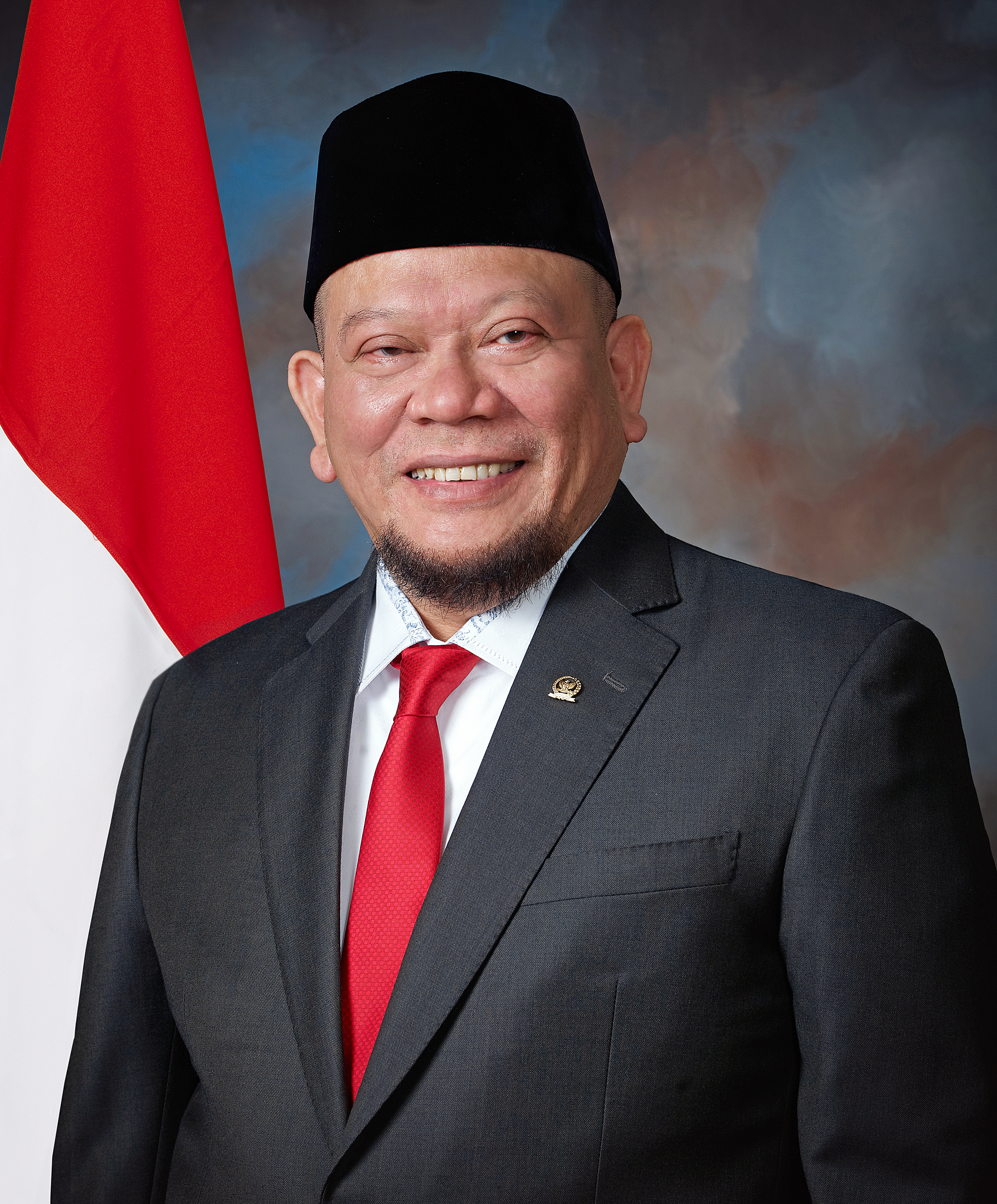
La Nyalla
Mattalitti

== Events ==
=== January ===
- 1 January – M 4.5 earthquake occurs 23 km (14 mi) north northeast of Lembang, West Java. Four hundred houses are damaged in Sumedang.
- 5 January – Four people are killed and 37 injured in a train head-on collision between Turangga Train operated by Kereta Api Indonesia (KAI) and Commuter Line Bandung Raya operated by KAI Commuter near Cicalengka, West Java.
- 18 January – Hundreds of homes are damaged and nearly a dozen people are injured after a tornado strikes villages in Bondowoso, East Java.
- 31 January – Gadjah Mada University releases the Bulaksumur petition calling on President Jokowi and his staff to stop the irregularities that occurred in the Indonesian government during his tenure and the 2024 Indonesian presidential election, and return to the corridors of democracy.

=== February ===
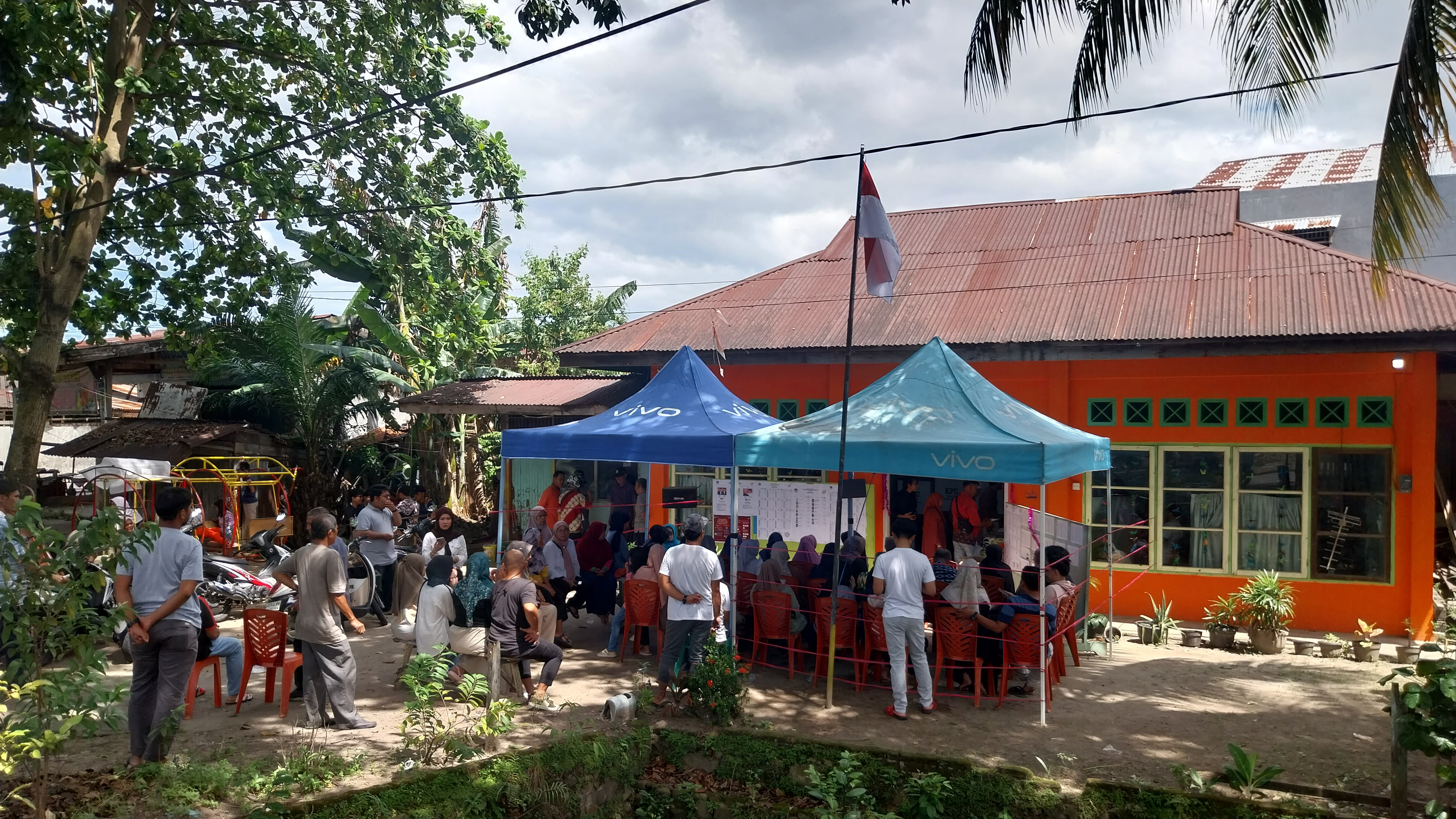
On 14 February, Indonesia holds the 2024 general election

- 2 February – Mahfud MD resigns as Coordinating Minister for Political, Legal and Security Affairs of Indonesia ahead of the 2024 Presidential Election, and is replaced by Tito Karnavian.
- 4 February – Three alleged Papuan rebels are arrested, one dies in suspicious and the other two are tortured, one of whom was recorded being tortured, 13 soldiers would be arrested in March.
- 13 February – Dirty Vote, a documentary film about the 2024 Election is released on YouTube and becomes viral for its allegations of fraud in the elections.
- 14 February – The 2024 Indonesian general election, the largest single-day election in the world, is held.
- 17 February – A passenger aboard Wings Air flight IW 1646 is injured after gunmen open fire on the aircraft as it lands at Nop Goliat Dekai Airport in Dekai, Highland Papua. Police blame the attack on an "armed criminal group".
- 19 February – Sixteen inmates escape during a jailbreak at Tanah Abang Police Station, Jakarta.
- 21 February
  - At least 33 people are injured after a tornado strikes Sumedang.
  - President Joko Widodo appoints Hadi Tjahjanto as the new Coordinating Minister for Political, Legal and Security Affairs and Agus Harimurti Yudhoyono as the new Agrarian and Spatial Planning Minister at Istana Negara, Jakarta.
- 28 February – One person is killed after a magnitude 2.8 earthquakes strikes West Java.

=== March ===
- 7 March – 11 March – At least 26 people are killed and 11 others go missing following floods and landslides caused by heavy rain in West Sumatra.
- 9 March – A fishing boat capsizes during stormy weather off the coast of Selayar Island, South Sulawesi. Of its 37 crew, two of them are killed, 11 are rescued and the remaining 24 remain missing.
- 14 March – 19 March – At least seven people are killed following flooding in Kudus Regency, Central Java.
- 20 March – The General Elections Commission announces the results of the 2024 Indonesian general election, officially declaring Prabowo Subianto and Gibran Rakabuming Raka as president-elect and vice president-elect respectively with the pair receiving over 96 million votes, with 58% of the vote, and won one round.
- 21 March – Seventy-five people are rescued from a capsized boat believed to be carrying 151 Rohingya refugees off the coast of Kuala Bubon, Aceh. Three bodies are recovered, and the remaining passengers are presumed "dead or missing".
- 22 March – Two earthquakes strike off the coast of East Java, injuring at least 15 people.
- 25 March – Thirteen soldiers are arrested after video emerges showing them torturing a suspected member of the Free Papua Movement in Puncak Regency, Central Papua.
- 27 March – Sandra Dewi's husband, Harvey Moeis, is named a suspect in the PT. Timah corruption scandal with total losses reaching 271 trillion rupiah.
- 30 March – An explosion occurs at an Indonesian National Armed Forces ammunition depot in Bantar Gebang, Bekasi, West Java.

=== April ===
Satellite imagery of the release of sulfur dioxide during the eruption of Mount Ruang

- 4 April – Two leaders of the West Papua National Liberation Army are killed in a shootout with security forces near Tembagapura, Central Papua.
- 8 April – A minivan collides with a bus along the Jakarta–Cikampek Toll Road in Karawang Regency, West Java, killing all 12 people on board the minivan and injuring two on the bus.
- 11 April – Seven people are killed and 15 others are injured after a bus falls into a ditch on the Batang-Semarang Toll Road, Central Java.
- 13 April – Twenty people are killed in landslides in Tana Toraja Regency, South Sulawesi.
- 14 April – At least six people are injured following clashes between personnel of the Indonesian Navy and the Indonesian National Police in Sorong, Southwest Papua.
- 17 April – Thousands of people are evacuated after Mount Ruang erupts in North Sulawesi, prompting a tsunami alert.
- 18 April
  - Seven people are killed in a fire at a shophouse in Mampang Prapatan, South Jakarta.
  - Two people are killed in a lahar flow caused by heavy rains near Mount Semeru, East Java.
- 20 April – Police announce the arrest of eight suspected members of a terrorist cell linked to Jemaah Islamiyah in raids across Central Sulawesi.
- 22 April – The Constitutional Court rejects all legal challenges against the results of the 2024 Presidential Election, allowing the KPU to declare the Prabowo-Gibran tandem the winner.
- 28 April – A magnitude 6.1 earthquake strikes off the coast of West Java, killing one person and injuring seven others.
- 30 April – Mount Ruang in North Sulawesi erupts again for the second time in a month, prompting the evacuation of over 12,000 people.

=== May ===
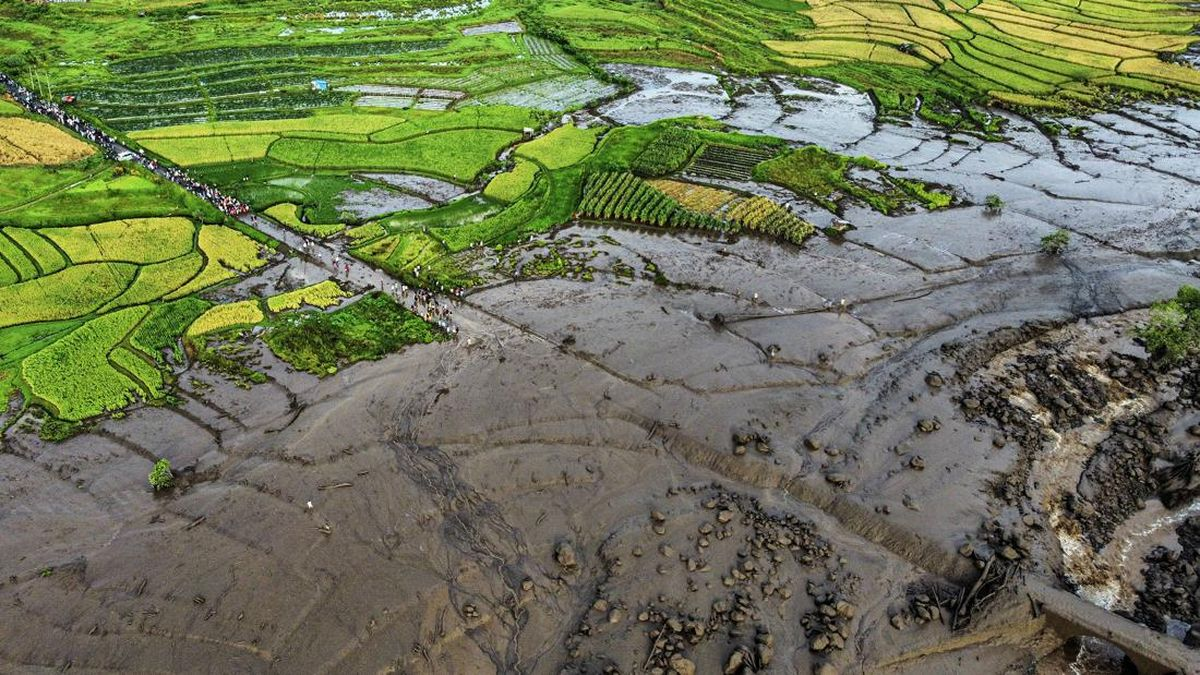
Lahar floods towns across West Sumatra following heavy rain in Mount Marapi

- 2 May – Fourteen people are killed in flooding and landslides in Luwu Regency, South Sulawesi.
- 11 May
  - A bus carrying students crashes onto multiple vehicles and overturns in Subang, West Java, killing 11 people.
  - 2024 West Sumatra floods : At least 67 people are killed and 20 others reported missing following mudslides and lahar flows from Mount Marapi in West Sumatra caused by heavy rain.
- 14 May – A magnitude 5.1 earthquake strikes Lombok, injuring one person.
- 19 May
  - A trainer aircraft crashes in BSD City, Serpong, killing three occupants inside.
  - Starlink commences operations in Indonesia.
- 21 May – After eight years in hiding, Pegi Setiawan alias Perong, one of three People on the Wanted List and the mastermind behind the murder of Vina Dewi Arsita and her lover, Muhammad Rizky Rudiana in Cirebon in 2016, is arrested by the West Java Regional Police in Bandung.
- 27 May – The National Police Traffic Corps (Korlantas) officially issues a C1 Driving License for two-wheeled vehicles with an engine capacity of 250-500cc in accordance with the policy references contained in Police Regulation Number 5 of 2021.
- 30 May – A magnitude 5.0 earthquake strikes Central Sulawesi, injuring five people.

=== June ===
- 3 June – Bambang Susantono and his deputy Dhony Rahajoe announce their resignation as heads of the Nusantara Capital City Authority.
- 4–5 June – A disturbance at a transmission substation located on a high voltage overhead line in South Sumatra causes a major power failure that affects most of Sumatra.
- 12 June – Authorities announce the arrest of six people on suspicion of hunting Javan rhinoceroses in Ujung Kulon National Park in Banten as part of an international poaching ring.
- 14 June – President Joko Widodo forms an Online Gambling Eradication Task Force, led by Coordinating Minister for Political, Legal and Security Affairs Hadi Tjahjanto as chairman, and Coordinating Ministry for Human Development and Cultural Affairs Muhadjir Effendy as deputy chairman, through Presidential Decree (Keppres) Number 21 of 2024 concerning the Online Gambling Eradication Task Force.
- 24 June – Authorities announce that the National Data Centre was targeted in a Cyberattack that affects more than 200 government agencies and was conducted by a hacking group demanding an Rp. 131 billion ($8 million) ransom. There was an attempt to turn off the Windows Defender security feature on 17 June so that malicious activity could occur. On 20 June, Windows Defender crashed and was rendered inoperable.
- 27 June – A raid on a villa in Bali results in the arrest of 103 foreign nationals on suspicion of involvement in cybercrime.
- 30 June – Chinese athlete Zhang Zhijie dies after collapsing at a match during the 2024 Badminton Asia Junior Championships in Yogyakarta.

=== July ===
- 3 July
  - The Election Organizer Honorary Council (DKPP) suspends Hasyim Asy'ari as chairman of the General Elections Commission due to sexual abuse allegations.
  - The country's first electric vehicle battery plant is inaugurated in Karawang, West Java, and invested Rp. 160 trillion.
  - Scientists announce the discovery of the world's oldest cave painting, depicting three people gathered around a large red pig, estimated to be at least 51,200 years old, in Leang Karampurang cave in the Maros-Pangkep region, South Sulawesi.
- 4 July – Eighteen leaders of Jemaah Islamiyah announce the disbanding of the militant group, after 31 years of operation.
- 7 July
  - A magnitude 4.6 earthquake strikes Central Java, injuring nine people.
  - At least 23 people are killed and 35 others are reported missing following a landslide that hits an illegal gold mine in Bone Bolango Regency, Gorontalo.
- 11 July – Former agriculture minister Syahrul Yasin Limpo is sentenced to ten years' imprisonment by a court in Jakarta for embezzling Rp. 44.7 billion ($2.7 million) in public funds.
- 16 July – Three suspected members of the Free Papua Movement are killed in clashes with the Indonesian National Army in Karubate Village, Muara District, Puncak Jaya Regency of Central Papua.
- 19 July – Three people are injured after a tourist helicopter crashes near Pecatu, Bali.
- 26 July – President Joko Widodo signs Government Regulation No. 28 of 2024, which bans female genital mutilation and single sales of cigarettes, and legalizes first-trimester abortions for medical emergencies, among other healthcare reforms.
- 31 July – A 19-year-old member of Islamic State is arrested by the Detachment 88 at Batu, East Java, while planning suicide bombings. Authorities also find triacetone triperoxide explosives, sulfuric acid, five jerrycans and one box of acetone, and other materials to create bombs.

=== August ===
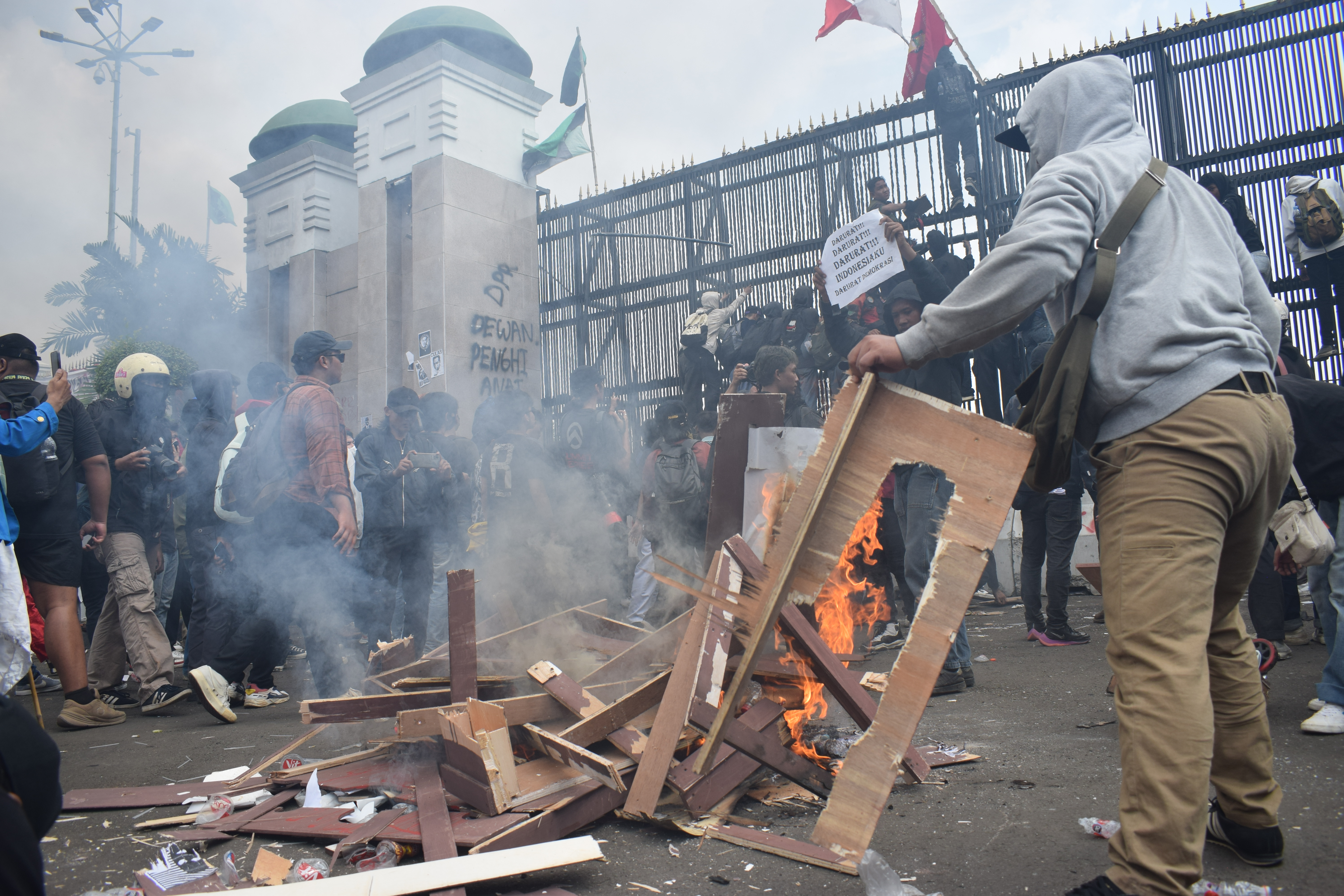
Protests erupts following plans to change Indonesian election law

- 5 August – A helicopter pilot from New Zealand is killed in a gun attack by suspected members of the West Papua National Liberation Army shortly after landing his aircraft in the village of Alama in Mimika Regency, Central Papua.
- 7 August – The tanker Elisabeth catches fire off the coast of Karangasem Regency in Bali, killing five crew and injuring 15 others.
- 8 August – Veddriq Leonardo clinches Indonesia's first gold medal in the 2024 Summer Olympics in Paris after winning in the speed climbing category. He is followed later in the day by Rizki Juniansyah, who wins in the 73-kilogram weightlifting competition.
- 12 August – Joko Widodo holds a cabinet meeting in Nusantara, marking the beginning of transition of the political power from Jakarta to Nusantara.
- 15 August – President-elect Prabowo secures a majority in the People's Consultative Assembly after the NasDem Party decides to join his political coalition.
- 17 August – For the first time in history, official celebreations for Indonesian Independence Day are held simultaneously in Jakarta and Nusantara.
- 19 August – President Joko Widodo reshuffles his cabinet. Three new ministers are inaugurated, namely Bahlil Lahadalia as Minister of Energy and Mineral Resources (ESDM), replacing Arifin Tasrif. Rosan Roeslani replaces Bahlil as Minister of Investment, while Supratman Andi Agtas becomes Minister of Law and Human Rights, replacing Yasonna Laoly.
- 20 August – The DPR rejects the Constitutional Court's ruling on the age limit for Regional Head Candidates. The age requirement for regional head candidates must be met when the KPU determines the candidate pairs for the regional elections participants in Decision Number 70/PUU-XXII/2024.
- 21 August – The Constitutional Court strikes down the 20% threshold needed for political parties to field candidates in elections for the Regional House of Representatives, prompting fears of a constitutional crisis and protests after the People's Consultative Assembly moves to pass legislation partially reversing the decision.
- 22 August –
  - 2024 Indonesian local elections: Thousands gather outside the House of Representatives in Jakarta as well as in other major cities, including Padang, Bandung and Yogyakarta, to protest attempted changes to local elections law to benefit the ruling coalition, in defiance of two recent Constitutional Court decisions. The chamber delays the vote after the protesters attempt to storm its building.
  - A court in Central Jakarta orders the firms Afi Farma and CV Samudera Chemical to pay 60 million rupiah to families of more than 320 children who either died or were injured by toxic cough syrup produced and distributed by the said companies.
- 25 August – Thirteen people are killed in flash floods in Ternate.

=== September ===
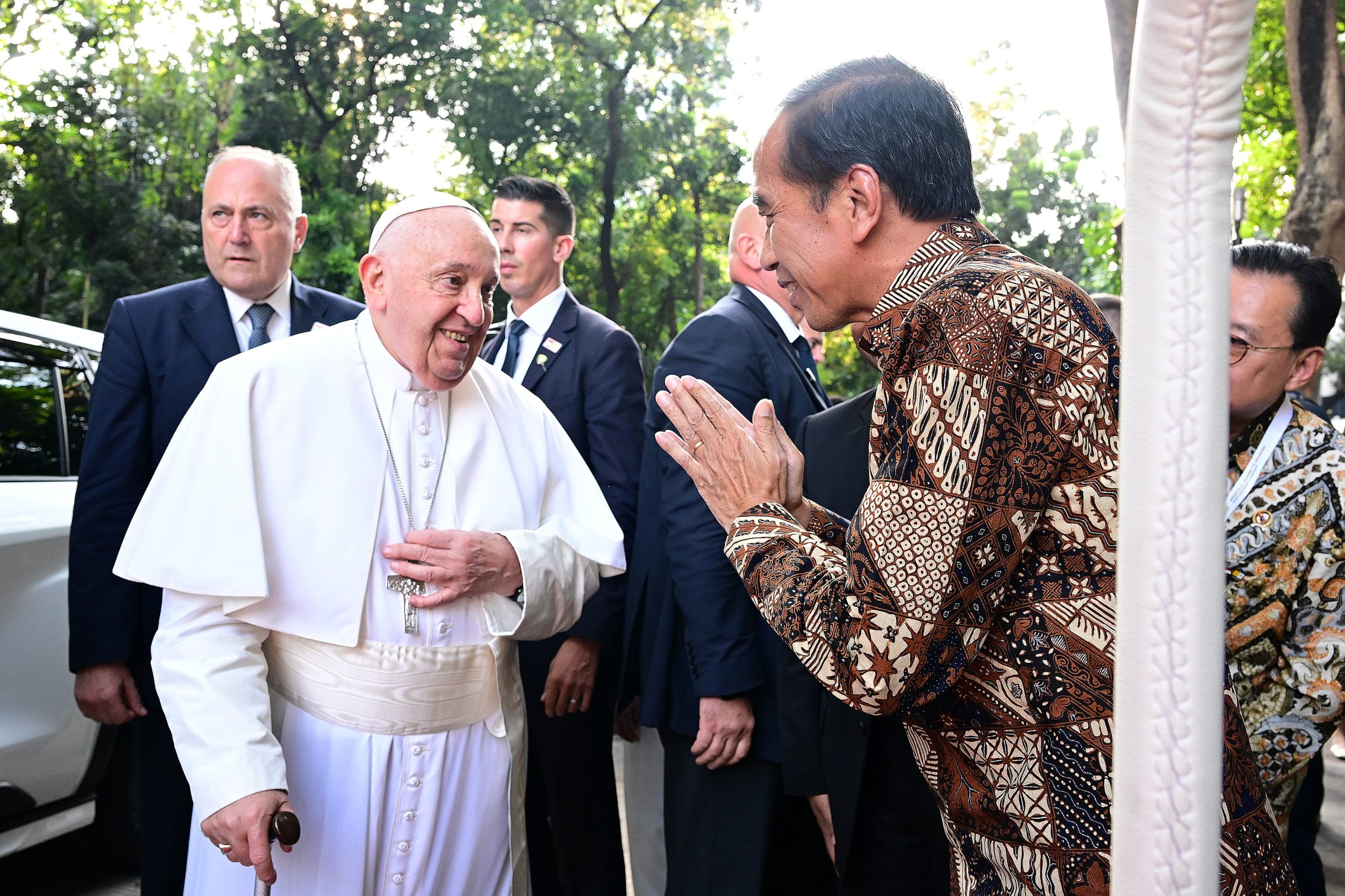
Pope Francis visits Indonesia in the first papal visit to the country in decades.

- 3–6 September – Pope Francis conducts the first papal visit to Indonesia since 1989.
- 3 September – Alice Guo, a former mayor wanted in the Philippines on suspicion of spying for China and other criminal activities, is arrested by the Directorate General of Immigration in Tangerang. She is extradited to the Philippines on 5 September.
- 9–20 September – The 21st PON (National Sports Week) 2024 is held in Aceh and North Sumatra.
- 17 September – APJII and the Telecommunication and Information Accessibility Agency (Bakti) of the Ministry of Communication and Information/Digital Affairs released data on Internet penetration in underdeveloped areas. The results showed that 82.6% of Indonesia's population in Underdeveloped Areas (3T Regions) are already connected to the Internet, a figure reaching 8,114,272 people.
- 18 September –
  - A magnitude 5.0 earthquake strikes Kertasari, Bandung Regency. At least two people are killed and more than 100 are injured, while approximately 4,000 structures are damaged.
  - A squall line sweeps through the Riau Islands and Singapore, killing one person and causing damages across the region.
- 21 September – Philip Mehrtens, a Susi Air pilot from New Zealand who had been taken hostage by the West Papua National Liberation Army in Nduga Regency in 2023, is freed.
- 22 September –
  - The bodies of seven teenagers are found floating on a river in Bekasi. Their deaths are attributed to street fighting.
  - A mother and her two children are killed after being struck by a train in West Java. A nearby passerby who was trying to warn them is also killed.
- 23 September – A car carrying 18 people collides with a towing truck in Banyuwangi, killing four people and injuring 14 others.
- 27 September – At least 15 people are killed in a landslide at an illegal gold mine in Solok Regency, West Sumatra.

=== October ===
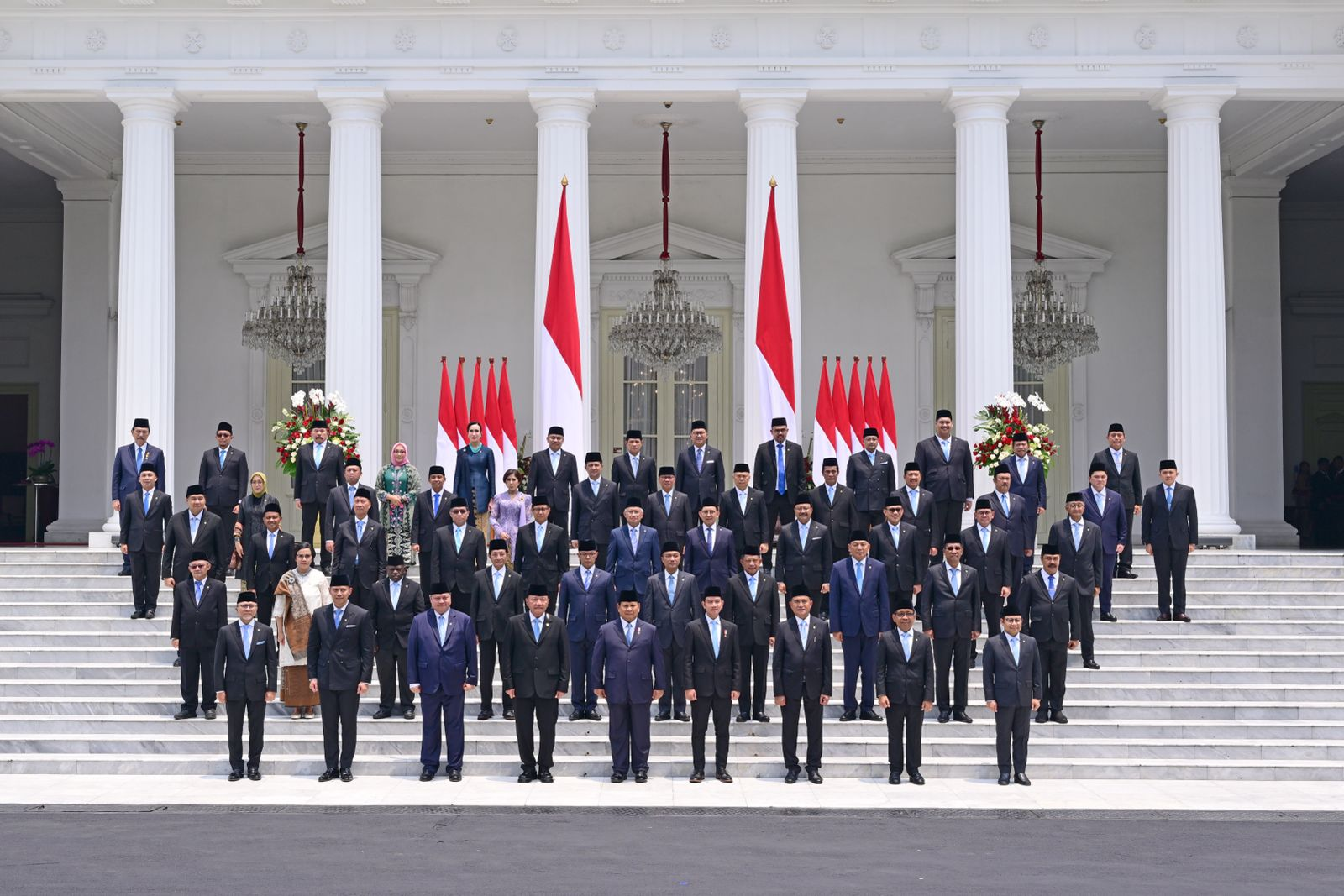
Indonesia inaugurates Prabowo-Gibran and their ministers for the 2024 - 2029 period

- 1 October – 580 Newly elected members of the People's Representatives Council for the 2024-2029 period are inaugurated in Jakarta.
- 8 October – Governor of South Kalimantan, Sahbirin Noor, along with six others, are named as suspects by the Corruption Eradication Commission due to their involvement in bribery.
- 10 October – LQ, a Chinese national wanted for running an investment scam that took in Rp. 210 trillion ($14 billion) in his home country, is arrested at Ngurah Rai International Airport in Bali.
- 15 October – The National Museum of Indonesia reopens following renovations caused by a massive fire in September 2023.
- 20 October – Inauguration of Prabowo Subianto and Gibran Rakabuming Raka as the 8th President of Indonesia and the 14th Vice President of Indonesia respectively.
- 21 October – Prabowo unveils the largest ministerial cabinet in Indonesia since the Second Revised Dwikora Cabinet of President Sukarno in 1966 called the Red White Cabinet, composed of 109 members including 48 ministers and 58 vice-ministers.
- 31 October – Six Rohingya refugees are found dead while 90 others are left stranded off the coast of East Aceh Regency, Aceh Province.

=== November ===
- 1 November – Eight people are killed in a fire at a cooking oil factory in Bekasi.
- 4 November – The Lewotobi Laki-Laki volcano erupts in Flores, killing at least nine people.
- 5 November
  - The government has finally issued a policy to write off bad debts for MSMEs, farmers, and fishermen in response to public aspirations. This policy is outlined in Government Regulation (PP) Number 47 of 2024 concerning the Write-Off of Bad Debts for MSMEs in the agriculture, plantation, livestock, fisheries, maritime, and other related sectors.
  - Apple requests a 50-year tax holiday as a condition for investing in Indonesia, sparking opposition from Commission VI of the House of Representatives, which calls the request excessive. As a result, the iPhone 16 is banned from entering Indonesia after Apple fails to meet the Domestic Component Level (TKDN) requirements and investment commitments set by the government.
- 14 November – Jensen Huang, CEO of Nvidia, was in Indonesia for Indonesia AI Day, an event held by Indosat Ooredoo Hutchison and GoTo Group for AI needs in business, and called it the "2 Quadrillion (2000 Trillion) Human".
- 24–25 November – At least 20 people are killed while two others are reported missing following landslides and flash floods caused by heavy rains in North Sumatra.
- 26 November – Hector Aldwin Pantollana, a Filipino national wanted for running an investment scam that took in $67.7 million (Rp. 1.1 trillion) in his home country, is arrested at Ngurah Rai International Airport in Bali.
- 27 November – The 2024 Indonesian local elections are simultaneously in more than 435,000 polling stations nationwide.
- 28 November – A bus traveling from Medan to Berastagi is caught in a landslide, killing seven people and injuring ten others.
- 29 November – President Prabowo announced a 6.5% increase in the Provincial Minimum Wage for 2025.
- 30 November – A boat carrying Rohingya refugees sinks off the coast of Aceh, with 116 passengers rescued by local fishermen.

=== December ===
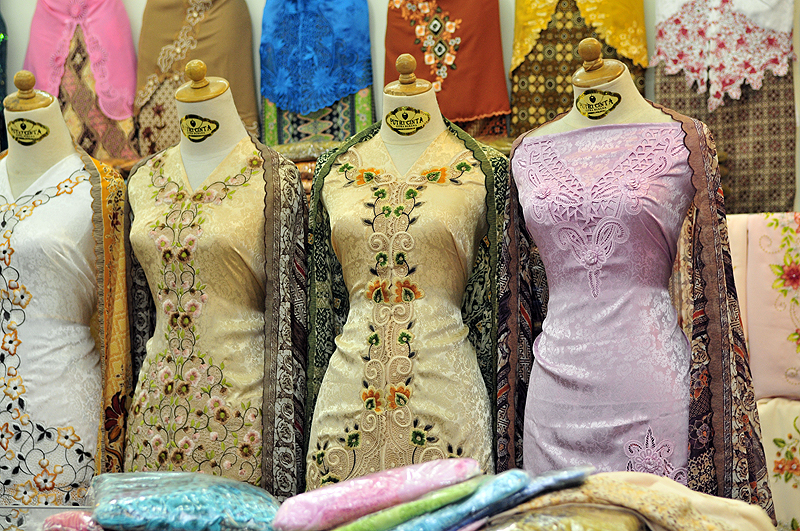
Indonesian Kebaya is recognized by UNESCO as Intangible Cultural Heritage

- 2 December – Yan Zhenxing, a Chinese national wanted for helping run an illegal online gambling ring that took in Rp. 284 trillion ($17.8 million) in his home country, is arrested at a cross-border ferry terminal in Batam.
- 4 December – The kebaya is recognised as part of UNESCO's Intangible Heritage list.
- 6 December – Miftah Maulana Habiburrahman, also known as Gus Miftah, resigns from his position as Special Envoy to President Prabowo Subianto after a video circulates of him belittling an iced tea seller while giving a religious study in Magelang, Central Java.
- 9 December – At least ten people are killed and two others are reported missing following flash floods and landslides in Sukabumi Regency, West Java.
- 11 December – PT XL Axiata Tbk (XL Axiata), PT Smartfren Telecom Tbk (Smartfren) and PT Smart Telcom (SmartTel) officially merge to form a new telecommunications entity called PT XLSmart Telecom Sejahtera Tbk (XLSmart).
- 15 December – The five remaining members of the Bali Nine incarcerated in Indonesia are returned to Australia.
- 18 December – Mary Jane Veloso, a Filipino national who had been on death row in Indonesia after being convicted for drug trafficking in 2010, is returned to the Philippines following a bilateral agreement.
- 24 December – A tanker truck spilled large amounts of sodium hydroxide on a road in West Bandung Regency, injuring more than 100 people.

== Holidays ==
- 1 January – New Year's Day
- 8 February – Isra' and Mi'raj
- 10 February – Chinese New Year
- 11 March – Day of Silence
- 29 March – Good Friday
- 31 March – Easter
- 10–11 April – Eid al-Fitr
- 1 May – International Workers' Day
- 9 May – Ascension Day
- 23 May – Vesak Day
- 1 June – Pancasila Day
- 17 June – Eid al-Adha
- 7 July – Islamic New Year
- 17 August – Independence Day
- 16 September – Prophet's Birthday
- 25 December – Christmas Day

== Deaths ==
=== January ===
- 2 January – Rizal Ramli, 69, senior economist and politician, former minister of finance, coordinating minister for maritime affairs, and economic affairs (b. 1954)
- 6 January – Anton Pain Ratu, 95, Roman Catholic prelate, auxiliary bishop (1982–1984) and bishop (1984–2007) of Atambua
- 14 January – Raema Lisa Rumbewas, 43, weightlifter (b. 1980)
- 19 January – Abdul Hadi W.M., 78, writer (b.1946)
- 22 January
  - Ignas Kleden, 76, writer (b.1948)
  - Yahya Harahap, 79, jurist, judge of the Supreme Court (1982–2000) (b. 1934)
- 31 January – Amrus Natalsya, 90, poet, painter, sculptist (b. 1933).

=== February ===
- 13 February – Tatang Farhanul Hakim, 62, politician, former Regent of Tasikmalaya (2001–2011) (b.1961).
- 20 February – Budhi Sarwono, 61, former Regent of Banjarnegara (2017–2022) (b.1962).
- 26 February – Edy Paryono, 69, football manager (b.1954).

=== March ===
- 5 March – Solihin G. P., former Governor of West Java (1970–1975) (b. 1926).
- 6 March – Polo Srimulat, comedian (b.1962).
- 19 March – Donny Kesuma, actor, presenter, athlete (b. 1968).
- 20 March – Muhammad Alwi Dahlan, former Minister of Communications and Informatics (1998) (b. 1933).
- 28 March – Sopyan Dado, actor (b. 1972).

=== April ===
- 8 April – Melitha Sidabutar, gospel singer (b. 2001).
- 9 April – Babe Cabiita, actor (b. 1989).

=== May ===
- 17 May – Levi Rumbewas, bodybuilder (b. 1948).
- 18 May – Salim Haji Said, academician and journalist, Ambassador to the Czech Republic (2006–2010) (b. 1943).

=== July ===
- 19 July – Dali Wassink, husband of actress Jennifer Coppen (b. 2002).
- 24 July – Hamzah Haz, former Vice President of Indonesia (2001–2004) (b. 1940).

=== October ===
- 18 October – Giulia Manfrini, 36, Italian surfer and snowboarder, impaled a swordfish.

=== December ===
- 28 December – Iwan Gayo, 73, writer of Buku Pintar series.
