= Maimunah =

Maimunah is a name. People with the name include:

- Tunku Azizah Aminah Maimunah Iskandariah
- Tunku Tun Aminah Maimunah Iskandariah
- Margaret Aliyatul Maimunah
- Maimunah Mohd Sharif
- Maimunah Awang
- Maimunah bint al-Harith
