= 2027 in Indonesia =

- Centuries: 20th; 21st
- Decades: 2000s; 2010s; 2020s
- See also: History of Indonesia; Timeline of Indonesian history; List of years in Indonesia

The following is a list of events from the year 2027 in Indonesia.

== Events ==
=== Planned or predicted ===
- 2026–27 Championship (Indonesia)

== Holidays ==
- 1 January — New Year's Day
- 5 January — Isra' and Mi'raj
- 6 February — Chinese New Year
- 9 March — Day of Silence
- 11 March — Lebaran
- 26 March— Good Friday
- 28 March — Easter
- 1 May — International Workers' Day
- 6 May — Ascension Day
- 17 May — Eid al-Adha
- 20 May — Vesak Day
- 1 June — Pancasila Day
- 6 June — Islamic New Year
- 17 August — Independence Day
- 15 August — Prophet's Birthday
- 25 December — Christmas Day
