= 2026 West Bandung landslide =

Natural disaster in West Java, Indonesia

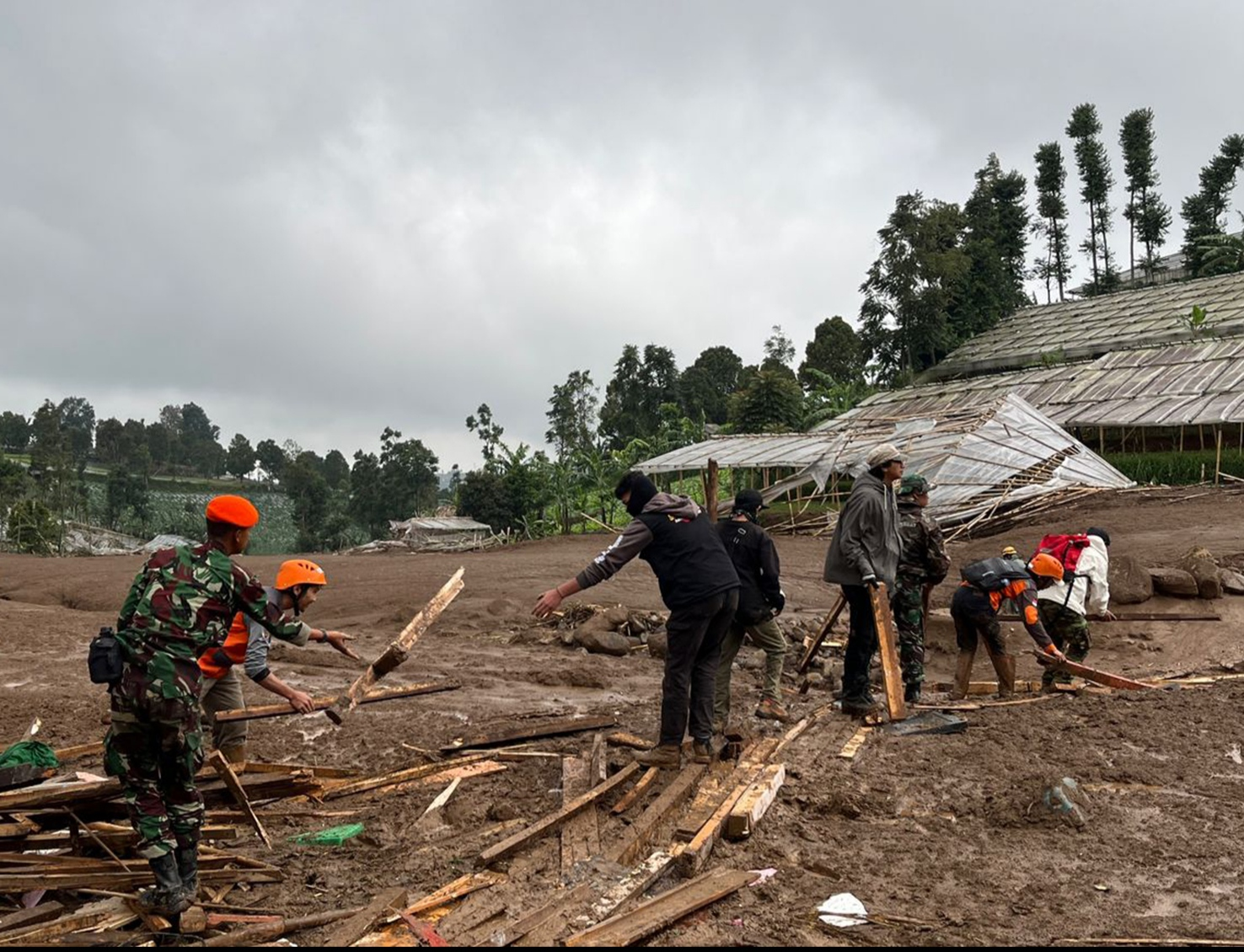
- A Korpasgat team evacuating a landslide victim
- Date: January 24, 2026
- Time: 02:30 WIB
- Location: West Bandung Regency, West Java, Indonesia; 6.794°S 107.536°E
- Cause: Heavy rain
- Deaths: 80
- Missing: 20

On the early morning of January 24, 2026, heavy rains caused major landslides in West Bandung Regency, West Java, Indonesia. The landslide buried at least 53 homes, and killed up to 80 people, and 20 others missing.

== Incident ==
According to the National Agency for Disaster Countermeasure (BNPB) the landslide was triggered by heavy rain and occurred on 24 January, at around 02.30 WIB in Cisarua District, precisely in Pasirlangu Village. Several residents said that the incident happened very quickly, starting with a loud bang from the direction of the hills before the landslide material hit the villages. Soil and rocks then moved from the slopes of Mount Burangrang, and immediately buried the houses of residents located below. In addition to heavy rainfall, changes of the land use on Mount Burangrang is suspected to have triggered the landslide. Near the location, there is the Bukit Mentari mountain, a tourist attraction, and many vegetable gardens. Large rocks fell and fallen trees were also seen along with mounds of landslides right above the area where it was once located.

== Casualties ==
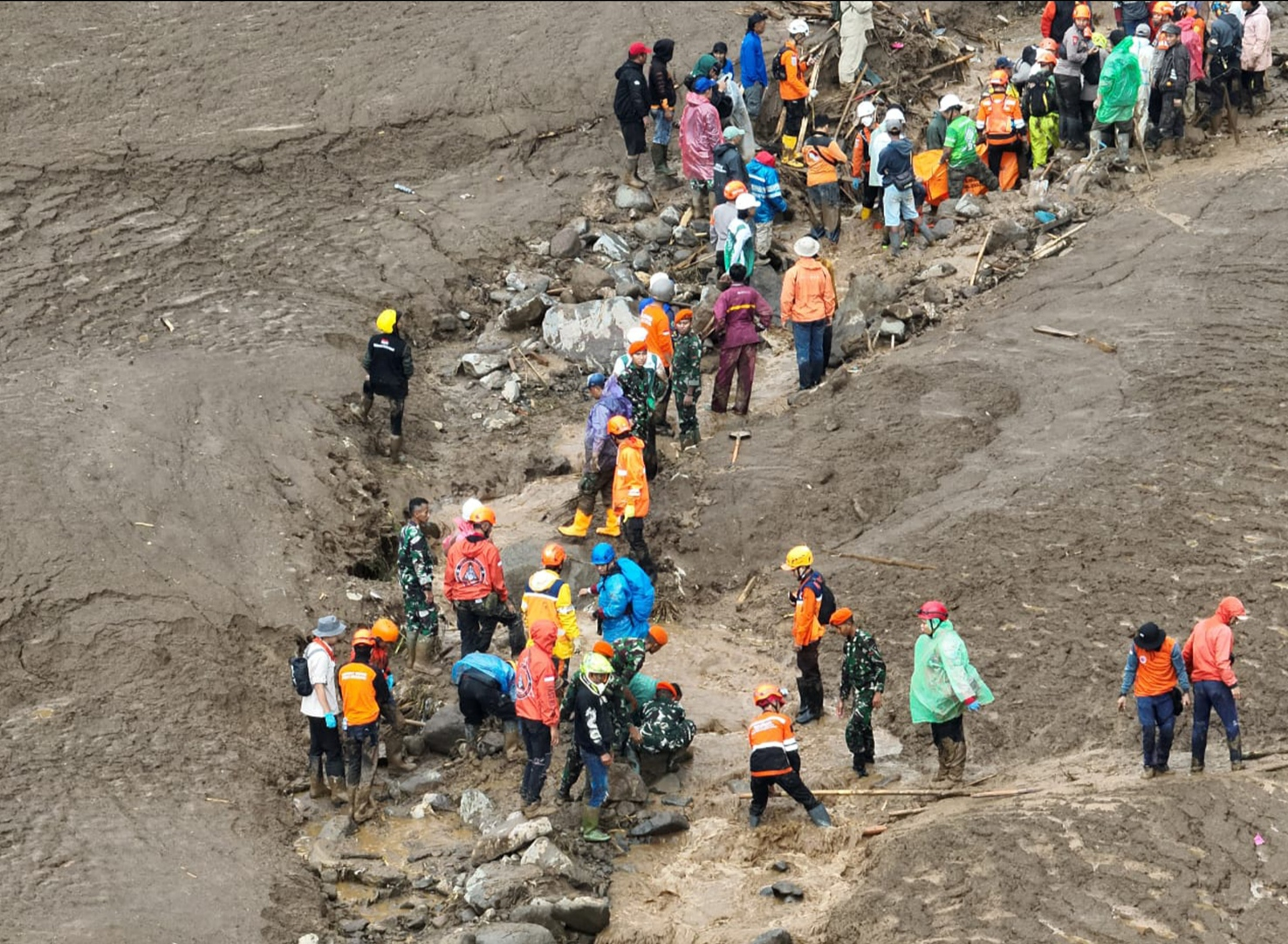
Kopasgat with several volunteers evacuated victims buried by the landslide.

Rescue operations were carried out after the landslide, including the Indonesian National Police (Polri) together with the Indonesian National Armed Forces (TNI), Basarnas (National Search and Rescue Agency), BNPB, BPBD (Regional Disaster Management Agency), and local government, as well as volunteers. According to the West Java Regional Disaster Management Agency (BPBD), 53 houses were damaged and buried, and many of which was severely damaged. The Regional Secretary of West Java Province, Herman Suryatman, said that at least 10 people died, and 82 others were still being searched for. He stated that of the 113 residents hit by the landslide, 23 survived and were evacuated to emergency tents. More than 400 people were displaced. Among the dead were 23 personnel of the Indonesian Marine Corps who were conducting training exercises in the area.

On January 25, the Joint SAR Team found 14 additional bodies, bringing the total number of fatalities from the landslide to 25, with 65 others still missing. On January 26, the Joint SAR Team found 13 additional bodies, with 20 bodies successfully identified by Disaster victim identification (DVI). On January 27, the joint SAR team stated that 50 dead bodies had been found, the number of residents affected by the landslide increased to 158, with 75 of whom survived and 30 others still missing. On January 28, the death toll increased to 53, with 27 others still missing and 38 bodies identified by IDV team. On January 31, the death toll from the landslide reached 70, with 10 others still missing, and 52 bodies identified.

On February 1, according to data from Search and Rescue teams, the death toll from the landslide has increased to 74 people, with six people remaining missing. On February 10, according to data from the SAR Team, all victims of the landslide had been found, a total of 80 people. Although all missing persons have been recovered, at the time of the incident, there may have been several more than just local residents, as some victims were not on the Incident Commander's search list. On February 14, the landslide search operation was closed with an estimated 20 people still missing.

== Response ==
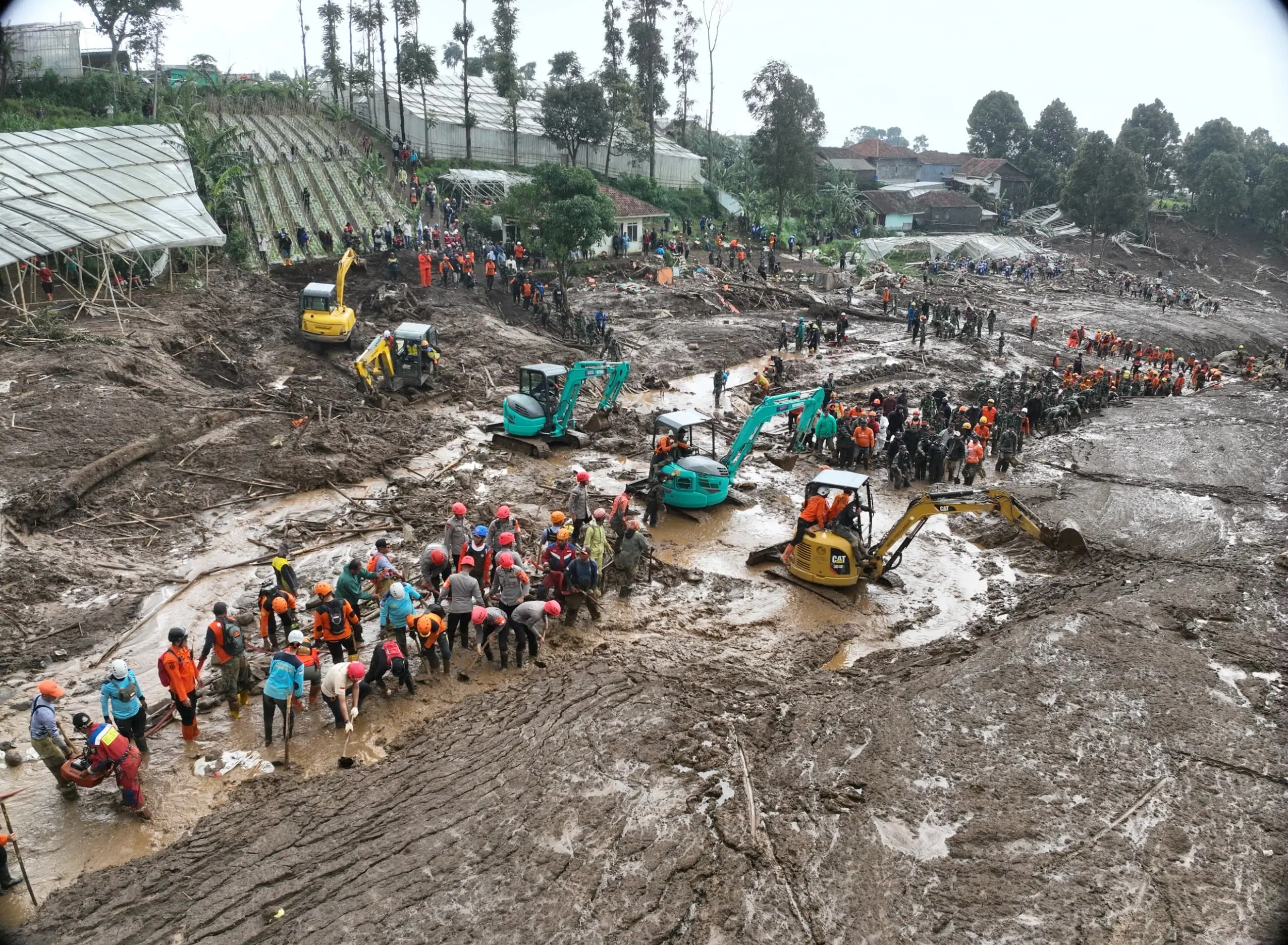
SAR team during evacuates with volunteers

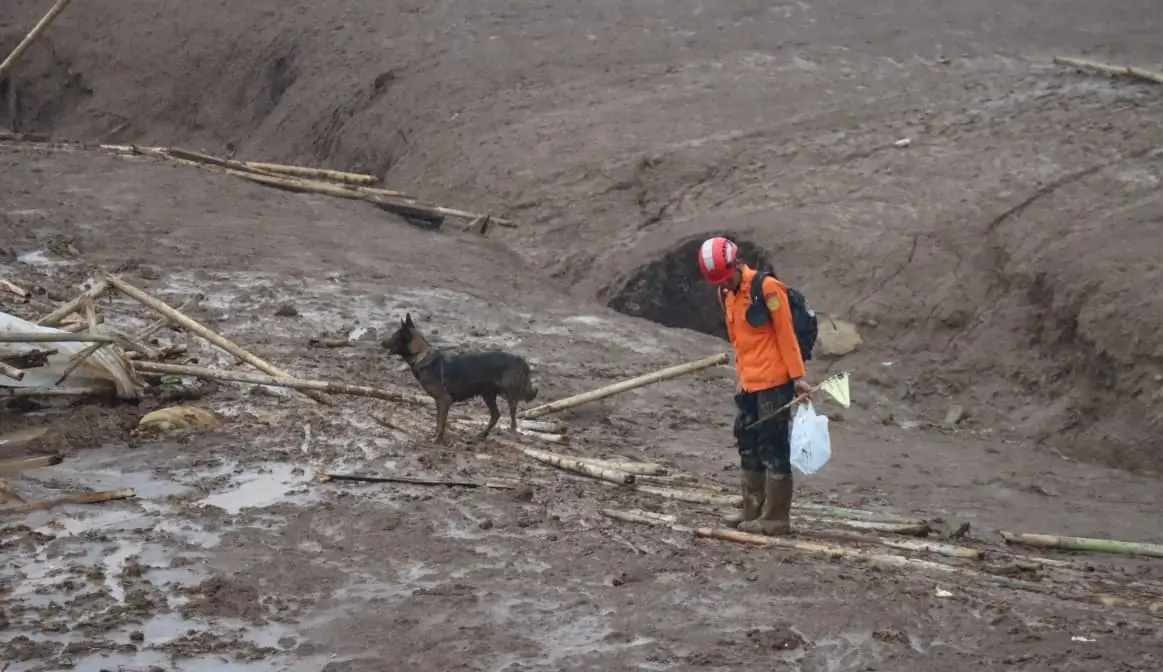
Indonesian National Police (Polri) deployed sniffer dog during operation rescue

Following the disaster, a massive search operation with more than 2,100 personnel using bare hands, water pumps, drones and nine excavators. Rescuers dug through tons of mud, rocks and uprooted trees in a landslide that stretched more than 2 kilometres (1.2 mi), according to Basarnas operation director Yudhi Bramantyo. He said that in some places the mud reached up to 8 metres (26 ft). The Ministry of Social Affairs Indonesia sent logistical aid from the West Java Provincial Social Services Warehouse to the evacuation site in Pasirlangu. The aid included one multipurpose tent, five family tents, 50 roll-up tents, 200 mattresses, 200 blankets, 500 ready-to-eat meal packages, 400 ready-to-eat side dishes, 100 children's meal packages, 100 family kit packages, 100 children's packages, and 50 clothing packages for children and adults.
