= Yahya Harahap =

Indonesian jurist (1934–2024)

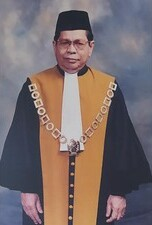

Justice of the Supreme Court of Indonesia
- In office 1982–2000

Personal details
- Born: 18 December 1934 Parau Sorat, North Sumatra, Dutch East Indies
- Died: 22 January 2024 (aged 89)
- Education: University of North Sumatra (LL.B)
- Occupation: Jurist

Yahya Harahap (18 December 1934 – 22 January 2024) was an Indonesian jurist. He served on the Supreme Court from 1982 to 2000.

Harahap died on 22 January 2024, at the age of 89.
