= Jafar Nainggolan =

Indonesian politician (1946–2026)

Member of the People’s Representative Council
- In office 1 October 2009 – 1 October 2014
- Constituency: Sumatra Utara I

Personal details
- Born: 23 July 1946 Pangururan, Samosir, North Sumatra, Indonesia
- Died: 8 January 2026 (aged 79) Jakarta, Indonesia
- Party: Partai Demokrat
- Spouse: Delima Florence Marpaung

Jafar Nainggolan (23 July 1946 – 8 January 2026) was an Indonesian politician and army colonel who served as a member of the People's Representative Council (DPR) from 2009 to 2014. He represented the electoral district of Sumatra Utara I, which covers the provinces of North Sumatra and Aceh. Nainggolan was a member of the Partai Demokrat, the ruling party of former president Susilo Bambang Yudhoyono. He died on 8 January 2026, at the age of 79.
