= Haerul Saleh =

Indonesian politician (1981–2026)

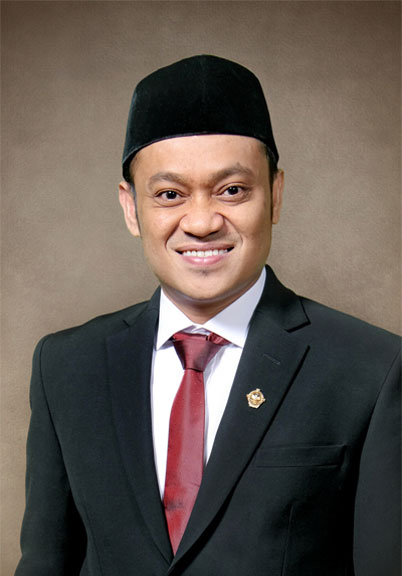
- Saleh in 2023

Member of the House of Representatives of Indonesia for Southeast Sulawesi
- In office 25 August 2020 – 19 April 2022
- In office 1 October 2019 – 30 September 2019

Personal details
- Born: 12 August 1981 Kolaka Regency, Indonesia
- Died: 8 May 2026 (aged 44) Jakarta, Indonesia
- Party: Gerindra
- Occupation: Businessman

Haerul Saleh (12 August 1981 – 8 May 2026) was an Indonesian politician. A member of the Gerindra Party, he served in the House of Representatives from 2014 to 2019 and again from 2020 to 2022.

Saleh died in a fire in Jakarta, on 8 May 2026, at the age of 44.
