= Benny Indra Ardhianto =

Indonesian politician (1992–2026)

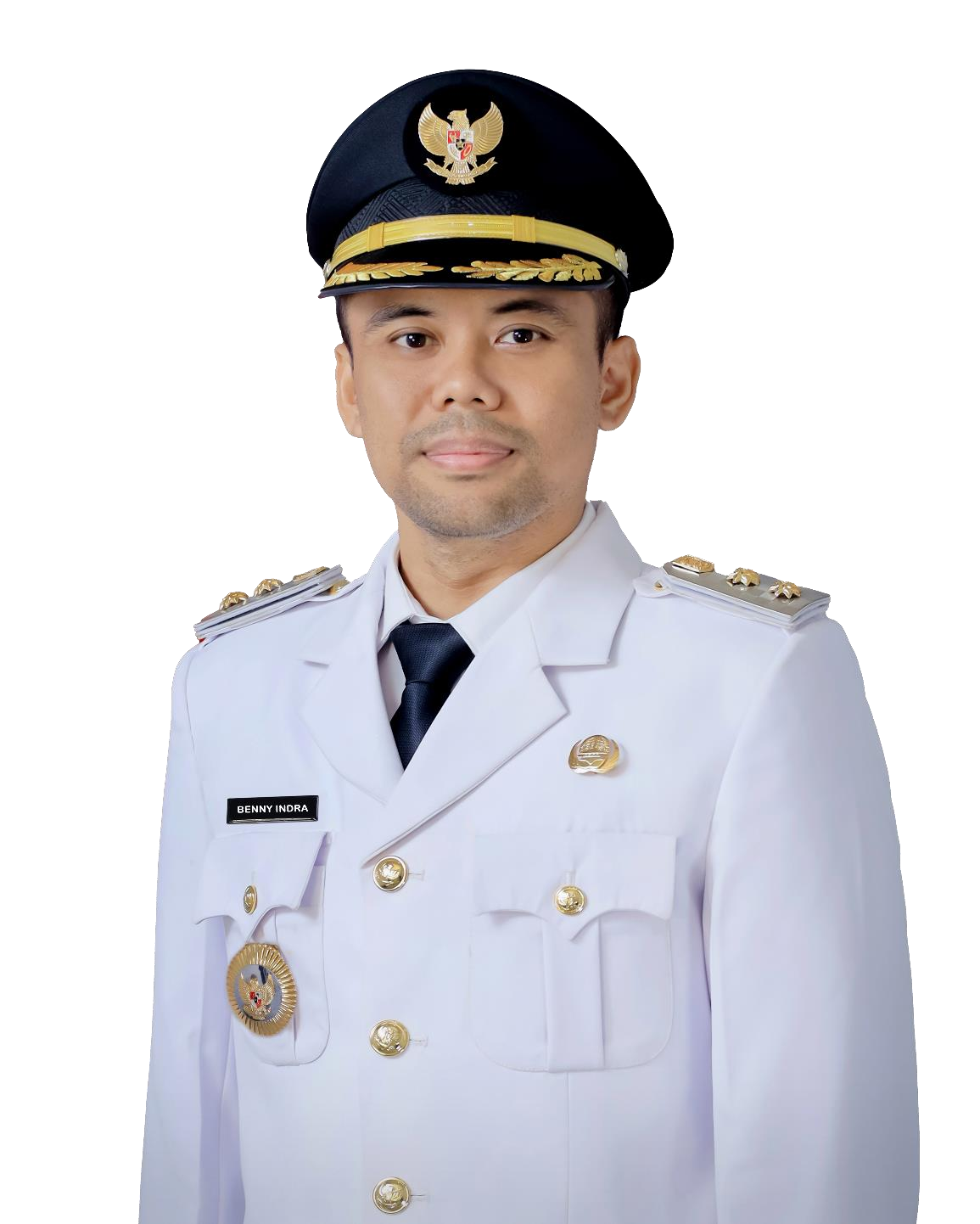

Vice Regent of Klaten
- In office February 20, 2025 – February 7, 2026
- President: Prabowo Subianto
- Governor: Ahmad Luthfi
- Regent: Hamenang Wajar Ismoyo
- Preceded by: Yoga Hardaya
- Succeeded by: Vacant

Personal details
- Born: April 14, 1992 Boyolali, Central Java
- Died: February 7, 2026 (aged 33) Semarang, Central Java
- Party: Gerindra
- Education: Gadjah Mada University
- Profession: Businessmen, Politician

Benny Indra Ardhianto (April 14, 1992 – February 7, 2026) was an Indonesian politician who served as vice regent of Klaten from 2025 until his death on February 7, 2026.

== Life and career ==
Ardhianto was born in Boyolali on April 14, 1992. He was a member of the Greater Indonesia Movement Party who served as the Vice Regent of Klaten initially for the 2025–2030 term; however, he died in 2026. He had been in office since February 20, 2025 after being inaugurated by President Prabowo Subianto at the State Palace, Jakarta.

== Death ==
Ardhianto died on February 7, 2026, at the age of 33 at Dr. Kariadi General Hospital in Semarang, Central Java. He had previously undergone intensive care due to cancer.
