= Gandung Pardiman =

Indonesian politician (1953–2026)

- Pardiman in 2018

Member of the House of Representatives of Indonesia
- In office 1 October 2009 – 30 September 2014
- Constituency: Special Region of Yogyakarta
- In office 26 July 2018 – 27 October 2026
- Constituency: Special Region of Yogyakarta

Personal details
- Born: 25 February 1953 Bantul Regency, Special Region of Yogyakarta, Indonesia
- Died: 27 October 2026 (aged 73) Yogyakarta, Indonesia
- Party: Golkar
- Education: Yogyakarta Veterans National Development University

Gandung Pardiman (25 February 1953 – 27 October 2026) was an Indonesian politician. A member of Golkar, he served in the House of Representatives of Indonesia from 2009 to 2014 and again from 2018 to 2026.

Pardiman died in Yogyakarta on 27 October 2026, at the age of 73.
