= 2024 West Bandung chemical spill =

On 24 December 2024, a tanker truck carrying concentrated sodium hydroxide in West Bandung Regency leaked its cargo while travelling from Purwakarta to Bandung. The chemical injured more than 100 people, including four serious injuries. A large number of motor vehicles were also damaged in the incident.

== Events ==
The truck involved in the incident was travelling along the Purwakarta-Padalarang road, carrying liquid sodium hydroxide with a concentration of 48 percent. In the morning of 24 December, the tanker began to leak out its contents, but the driver did not stop for some time, causing around 20 tonnes of its cargo to spill over an 8 kilometer stretch of the road. The truck was owned and operated by CV Yasindo Multi Pratama, a local chemical supplies company. The chemical had been manufactured in Karawang by PT Pindo Deli and was being transported to Yasindo's warehouse in Bandung.

As other vehicles passed near the spill, the chemical damaged engines, tires, and vehicle bodies, injuring drivers from chemical vapors and splashes. Four people suffered serious chemical burns with a further 100 receiving lighter injuries. Local police recorded 1,260 vehicles damaged to varying degrees.

== Aftermath ==
The spill primarily drained into local sewers, prompting environmental groups to caution locals near the incident site to avoid the use of groundwater for some time. West Java's police department deployed a CBRN defense team to the affected roads, although by the time it arrived, the sodium hydroxide had largely reacted with the surrounding environment or drained off by rain. The truck's driver was initially designated as a witness in the criminal investigation, as the truck still had a valid permit for transporting materials. Yasindo, the involved company, promised compensation for damages to vehicles and for treatment of injuries.

By early January, Yasindo had begun distributing compensation to the affected road users, although many recipients complained that the amount paid was insufficient.
