= 2024 Gome torture scandal =

Indonesian military scandal in West Papua

- Part of the Papua conflict
- Location: Omukia, Puncak Regency, Indonesia
- Date: 3–6 February 2024
- Attack type: Accidental killing (claimed), dragging (alleged), beating, stabbing, water torture, and hate crime
- Victims: Warnius Murib; Defianus Kogoya; Alianus Murib
- Perpetrators: Kodam III/Siliwangi, 300th Raider Infantry Battalion/Brajawijaya
- Motive: Counter-insurgency (claimed), and racism (alleged)
- Convicted: 13 elite soldiers

In early February of 2024, a scandal erupted following the torture of two alleged members of the Free Papua Movement and the death of another in Omukia village, Gome district. Later in March, two videos surfaced showing one of the men, Defianus Kogoya, being tortured in a barrel drum went viral and caused major criticism by West Papuans and human rights defenders.

== Incident ==
On 3 February 2024, three students from Mangume, Warnius Murib (18) also known as Warnius Kogoya, Defianus Kogoya (19), and Alianus Murib (19) were arrested by Indonesian soldiers of the Kodam III/Siliwangi, 300th Raider Infantry Battalion/Brajawijaya. They alleged the men were OPM members and had wanted to burn down the Puskesmas, a community healthcare center in Omukia village, Gome District, Puncak Regency.

The army also claimed that after the men had been confronted, a shootout between the soldiers and the men occurred. However the families of Defianus and Alianus claim that they were arrested while building a roof, and Warnius’ family claimed he was arrested while collecting firewood.

While they were being taken to the police station, Warnius died after he allegedly attempted to escape by jumping out of the truck and hitting his head on a rock, however his family claim he was tied to the back of the car and dragged for around a kilometer and then tortured to death. While Alianus was at the police station, he was interrogated and tortured. Later that night the soldiers bounded Defianus’ hands behind his back and placed him in a barrel drum full of water. The soldiers began to beat him and then stab and slash his back with a bayonet while shouting racial slurs at him. After a while he eventually fainted and was subsequently taken to a nearby health center. Defianus and Alianus weren't adequately treated for the injuries they sustained while in custody, three days after their arrest they were released on 6 February, due to a lack of evidence.

== Response ==
On 21 March 2024 the video of Kogoya’s torture surfaced, initially the Indonesian Army claimed the video was a hoax and was edited, Maj. Gen. Izak Pangemanan told reporters "There have never been complaints about harsh behavior towards the community. We're still confirming the video."

After the integrity of the video was confirmed they announced they were launching an official investigation of the incident. On 25 March Izak Pangemanan announced they had arrested 13 elite soldiers after questioning 43 soldiers in total. The detained soldiers were held in a maximum security detention camp in West Java.

Military spokesman Brig. Gen. Kristomei Sianturi spoke on the incident saying "This is a violation of the law and we will act according to the applicable laws and regulations," Sianturi added "This is what we regret, that the Indonesian military or Indonesian army never taught, never approved any violence in asking for information."

Izak Pangemanan was also quoted as saying "We regret what happened, it shouldn't have happened," Pangemanan then publicly apologized for the soldiers actions saying that "We apologize to all Papuans." Pangemanan also responded to the death of Warnius saying "We took him to the health center but in the end, he died."

On 3 April protests were held in Jayapura at Perumnas 3 Waena and the Jayapura University of Science and Technology. The protests were violently crushed, resulting in the arrest of 62 protestors.
