= Salim Sayyid Mengga =

Indonesian army officer and politician (1951–2026)

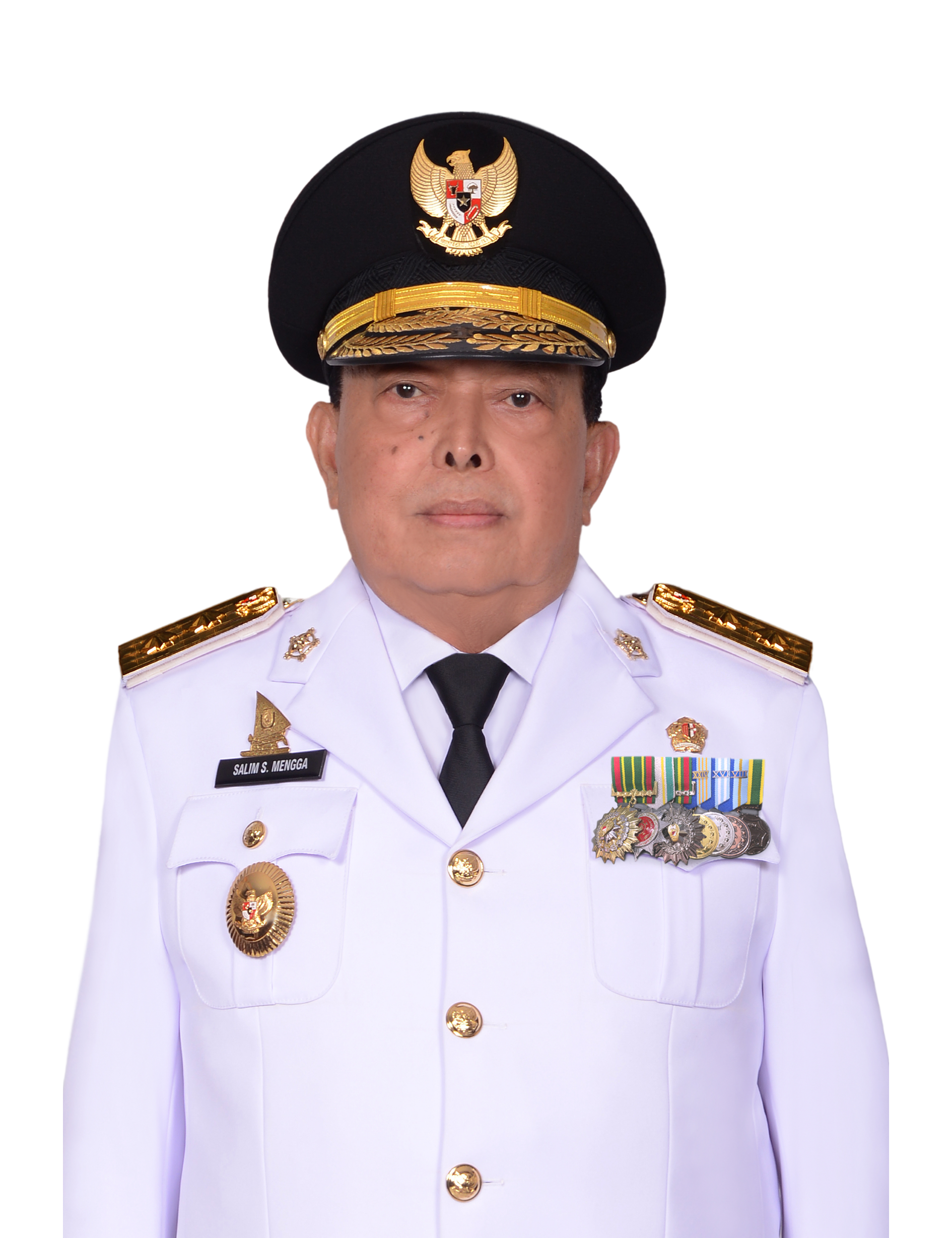

Vice-Governor of West Sulawesi
- In office 20 February 2025 – 31 January 2026
- Governor: Suhardi Duka
- Preceded by: Enny Anggraeny Anwar

Member of the House of Representatives
- In office 1 October 2009 – 19 December 2016
- Constituency: West Sulawesi

17th Commander of Kodam XVI/Pattimura
- In office 2005–2006
- Preceded by: Syarifudin Sumah
- Succeeded by: Sudarmaidy Soebandi

Personal details
- Born: 24 September 1951 Pambusuang, Polewali Mandar, Indonesia
- Died: 31 January 2026 (aged 74) Makassar, South Sulawesi, Indonesia
- Party: NasDem Party (2018–2023, 2025–2026); Perindo Party (2023–2025); Democratic Party(2008–2018)
- Relatives: Munafri Arifuddin (nephew)
- Education: Indonesian Military Academy (1974)

Military service
- Allegiance: Indonesia
- Branch/service: Indonesian Army
- Years of service: 1974–2006
- Rank: Major General
- Unit: Cavalry

Salim Sayyid Mengga (24 September 1951 – 31 January 2026) was an Indonesian army officer and politician who served as vice-governor of West Sulawesi from February 2025 until his death on 31 January 2026. A retired major general of the Indonesian Army, he earlier sat in the national House of Representatives from 2009 to 2016.

== Early life and education ==
Mengga was born in Pambusuang, Polewali Mandar, on 24 September 1951. He entered the Indonesian Military Academy and graduated in 1974 from the cavalry branch, later completing officer education that included the Indonesian Army Command and General Staff College and the National Resilience Institute.

== Career ==
After commissioning in 1974, Mengga served in cavalry and territorial commands, including company and battalion leadership within Kodam XIV/Hasanuddin and Kodam IV/Diponegoro, as well as staff and instructional posts. He later became chief of staff of Kodam IV/Diponegoro, deputy commander of the Army Doctrine, Education and Training Command and commander of Kodam XV/Pattimura, attaining the rank of major general. The Armed Forces public affairs office later confirmed approval of his early retirement from active service.

Transitioning to politics, Mengga was elected to the House of Representatives in the 2009 legislative election for the West Sulawesi constituency with the Democratic Party, serving on Commission I which oversees defense, foreign affairs and information. He won reelection for the 2014 to 2019 term but resigned on 19 December 2016, after which his seat was filled through the parliament's replacement mechanism.

In the 2024 regional elections he ran as deputy to Suhardi Duka in the West Sulawesi ticket, and the pair were sworn in at the State Palace on 20 February 2025 for the 2025 to 2030 term. As vice-governor, he drew on his military and parliamentary background to support provincial administration before dying in office in Makassar on 31 January 2026, with burial arranged at the Kalibata Heroes Cemetery in Jakarta.
