= Waldi Murad =

Indonesian military admiral (1950–2026)

Waldi Murad (28 November 1950 – 13 June 2026) was an Indonesian military admiral.

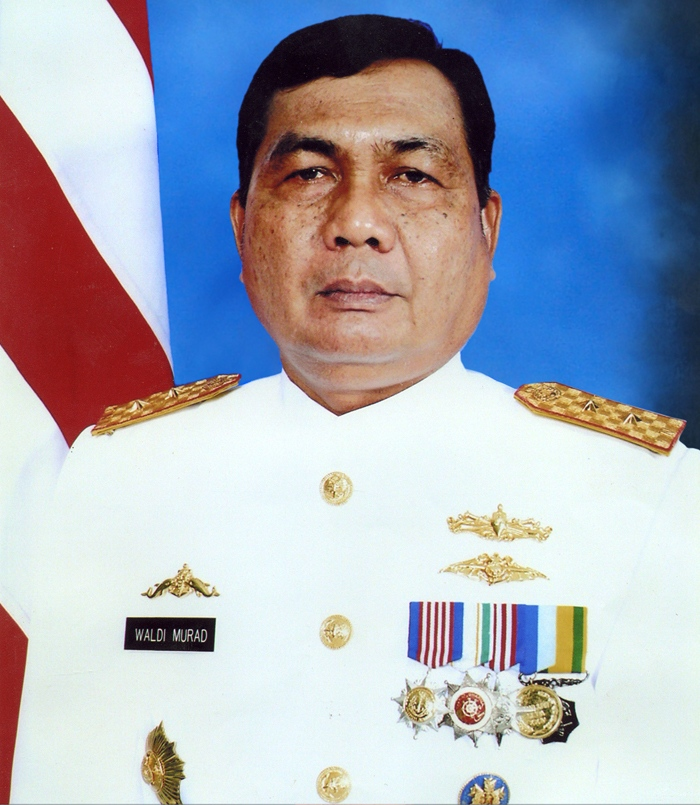
Waldi Murad

== Biography ==
Murad was born in Pekanbaru on 28 November 1950. He served as the admiral, vice chief of staff of the Navy between 2006 and 2007.

Murad died on 13 June 2026, at the age of 75.
