= Margaret Aliyatul Maimunah =

Indonesian women's rights activist (1978–2026)

Margaret Aliyatul Maimunah (11 May 1978 – 1 March 2026) was an Indonesian women's rights activist.

== Life and career ==
Maimunah was born in Jombang, East Java on 11 May 1978. She served as the General Chairperson of Fatayat Nahdlatul Ulama (NU). She served as Chairman of Fatayat NU for the 2022–2027 period after being elected in the XVI Congress forum of Fatayat NU in Palembang, South Sumatra.

Maimunah died in Jakarta on 1 March 2026, at the age of 47.
