= Anti-police sentiment =

Attitude and stance against police officers

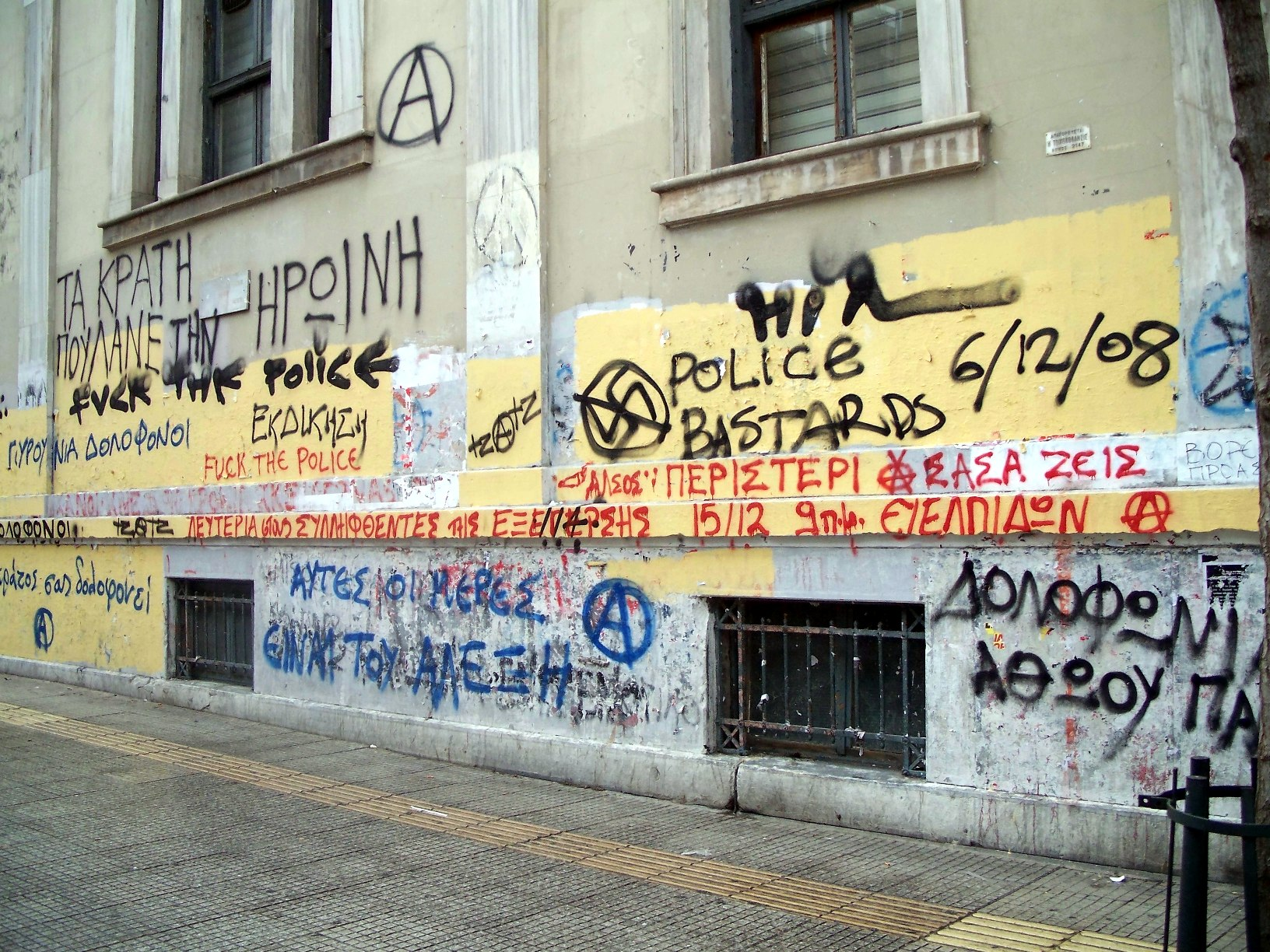
Anti-police graffiti in Athens, 2008

Anti-police sentiment is opposition to the police by groups or individuals. This sentiment can arise from perceptions of systemic issues within policing institutions, such as misconduct, excessive use of force, racial profiling, and corruption.

== By country ==
=== France ===
CRS SS poster from the City of Paris Fine Arts Workshops, during May 68. CRS is a French Riot control unit.

The 5 November 2026 in Strasbourg, a giant carnival-like cardboard mannequin depicting a CRS police officer (carrying the mention "CRS = SS") built by students of the Haute école des arts du Rhin is brought to a demonstration during the 2026 French student protests. At the end of the protest, the mannequin is burned under the acclamation of ACAB-shouting demonstrators. The next day, the prefect of Bas-Rhin condemns this act and takes legal action.

=== Indonesia ===
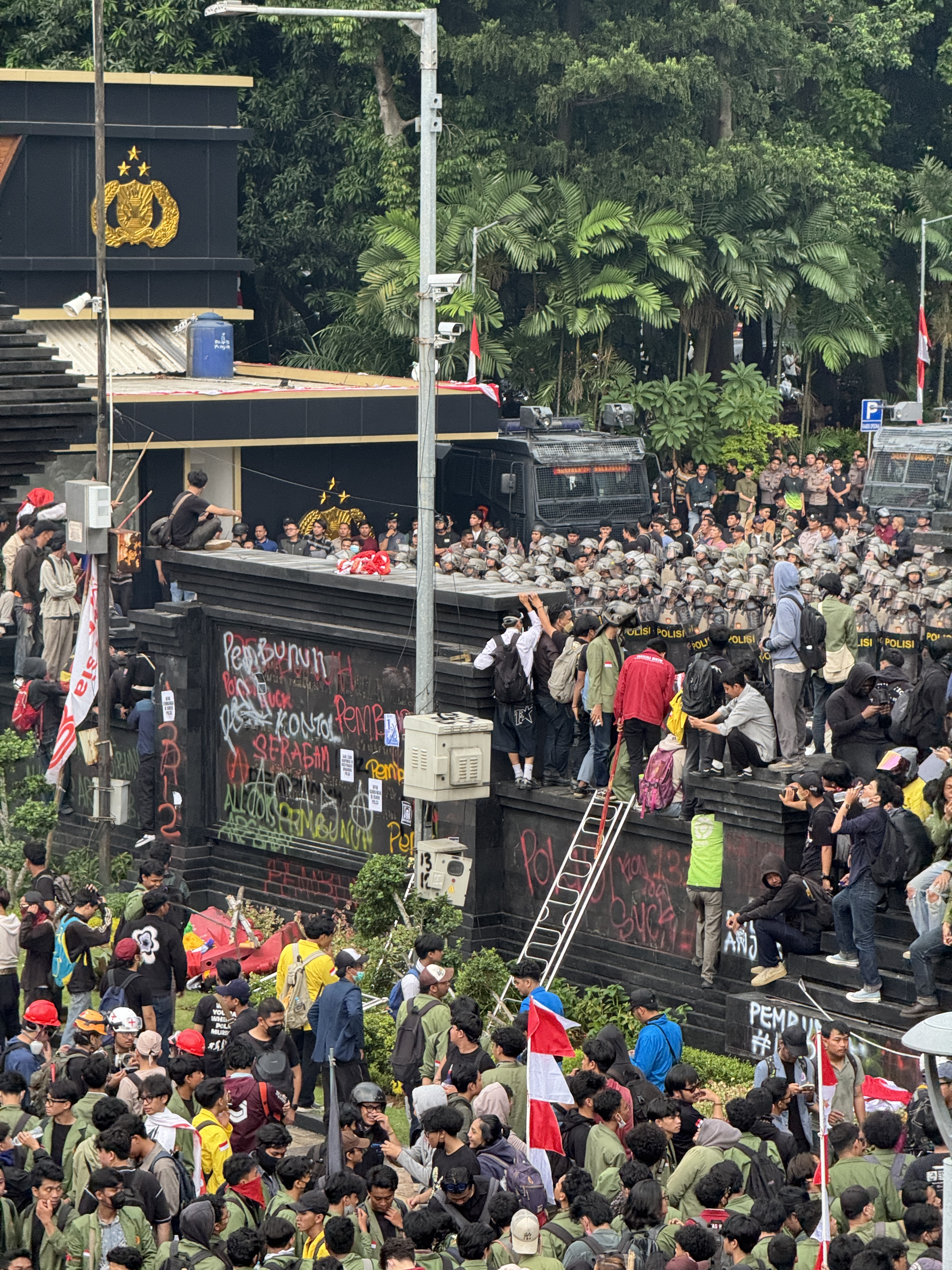
Jakarta police headquarters being surrounded by angry mobs during August 2025 riot in Jakarta

In 2021, a police officer was recorded slamming student protesters in Banten. In the same year, a woman named Novia Widyasari was found dead in front of her father's grave after she found out about her pregnancy in aftermath of the rape perpetrated by a police officer who was her boyfriend. The incident later raised the anti-police sentiment among the locals even further.

The sentiment began to resurface after the murder of Nofriansyah Yosua Hutabarat in 2022. The killing was ordered by Inspector General Ferdy Sambo, his former boss. Police use of tear gas and incompetence in Kanjuruhan Stadium disaster also fueled this sentiment.

On 2024, a primary school teacher from Konawe Regency, Southeast Sulawesi was arrested for allegedly disciplining a student who happens to be a son of a local police officer and asked to pay 50 million Rupiah fines. The arrest prompted anger among Indonesian internet users, flaming another anti-police sentiment in Indonesia.

=== Ireland ===
Anti-Garda Síochána (Republic of Ireland police) sentiment is common among Irish Travellers, a social group with high levels of poverty, unemployment and crime. Gardaí were also accused of police brutality in the Shell to Sea protests of 2006–2011, and anti-brutality protests took place in 2007. Anti-Garda sentiment is also common in Dublin's north inner city, an area of high crime, deprivation and drug addiction. Local youths attacked Gardaí during the 2006 Dublin riots, sparked by a Love Ulster protest. The Kerry babies case of 1984 also sparked anti-Garda feeling in the area. The acronym AGAB, a variation on ACAB, is sometimes used.

=== Poland ===
In Poland, the abbreviation CHWDP is used with the meaning of "a dick in the police's ass." It often appears as graffiti.

=== Sweden ===
A series of riots took place in Sweden in April 2022 after Danish-born, right-wing activist Rasmus Paludan attempted to hold a series of Quran burning demonstrations in the country. Counterprotesters responded by attacking participants and engaging in rioting, often getting into violent clashes with police. National Police Commissioner Anders Thornberg said that, in some cases, protesters "tried to kill police." In an interview with Agence France-Presse, Kivanc Atak of Stockholm University interpreted the riots to be unusual as, unlike most incidents causing conflict between police and minorities, the unrest was not directed against a specific case of police misconduct nor even the subject in general. Manne Gerell of Malmö University further added that some of those involved in the unrest might have been seeking to vent general frustration against police, such as over the use of stop and search powers. Anders Thornberg said some rioters were suspected to have "[had] links to criminal gangs" and that the police would look into it.

=== United Kingdom ===
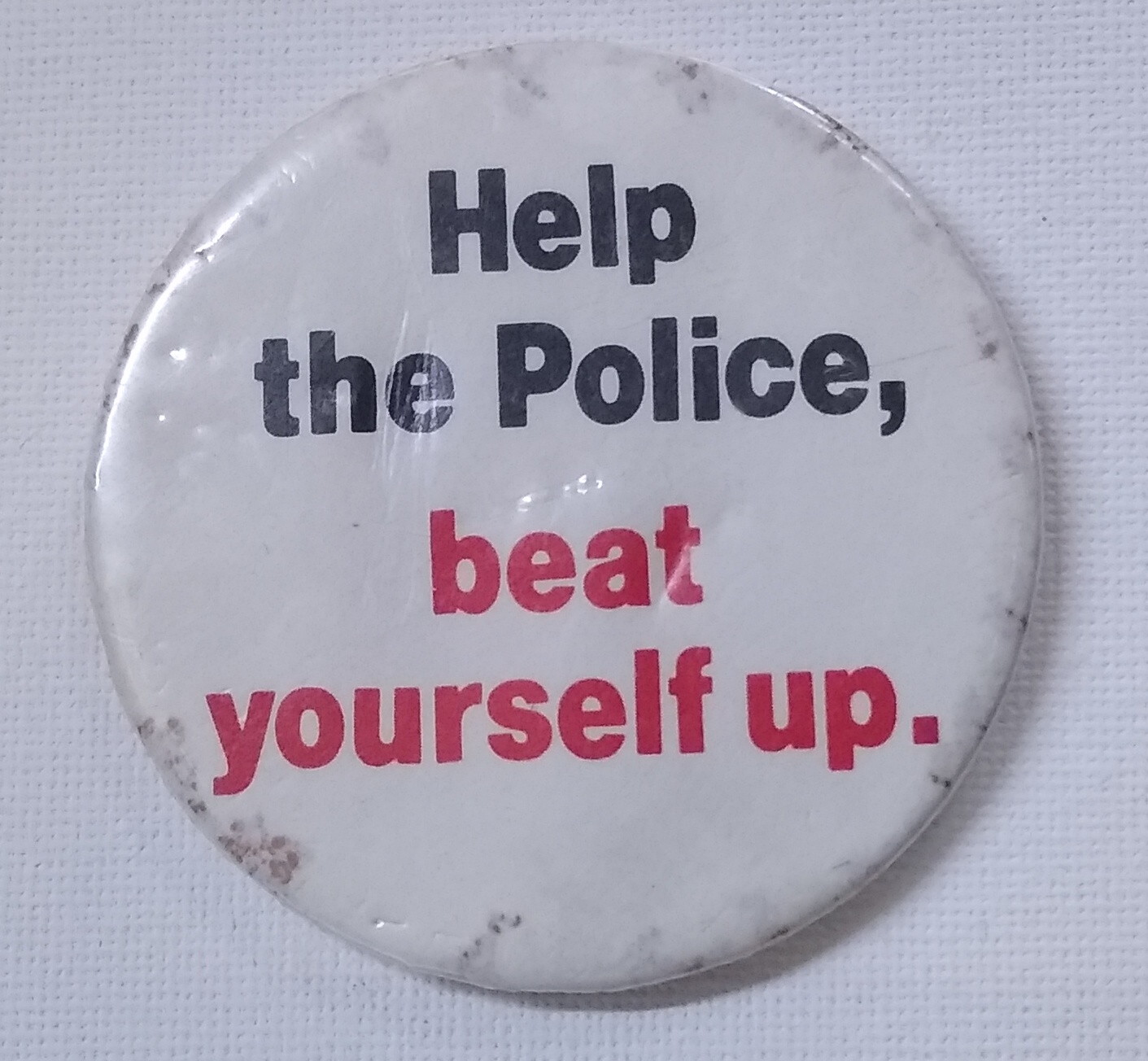
A pin from Northern Ireland that reads "Help the Police, beat yourself up."

Contrary to its European neighbours, England did not have a tradition of professional police forces. Crime prevention was carried out by a combination of the town watch and the parish constabulary appointed by the justices of the peace in each county. In Great Britain during the late 1790s, anti-police views were based on the possible encroachment of absolutism through professionalised law enforcement, the obstruction of the magistrates' power and skepticism towards trusting an unfamiliar organisation.

=== United States ===
In the 1950s, William Westley suggested that anti-police sentiment may come from the social stigma of working in dangerous conditions, having to work with stigmatized others, and at times unethical practices.

In the 1970s, police departments began to become concerned about litigation over police misconduct.

Distrust of police in the U.S. is sometimes mentioned in connection to police brutality and racial profiling.

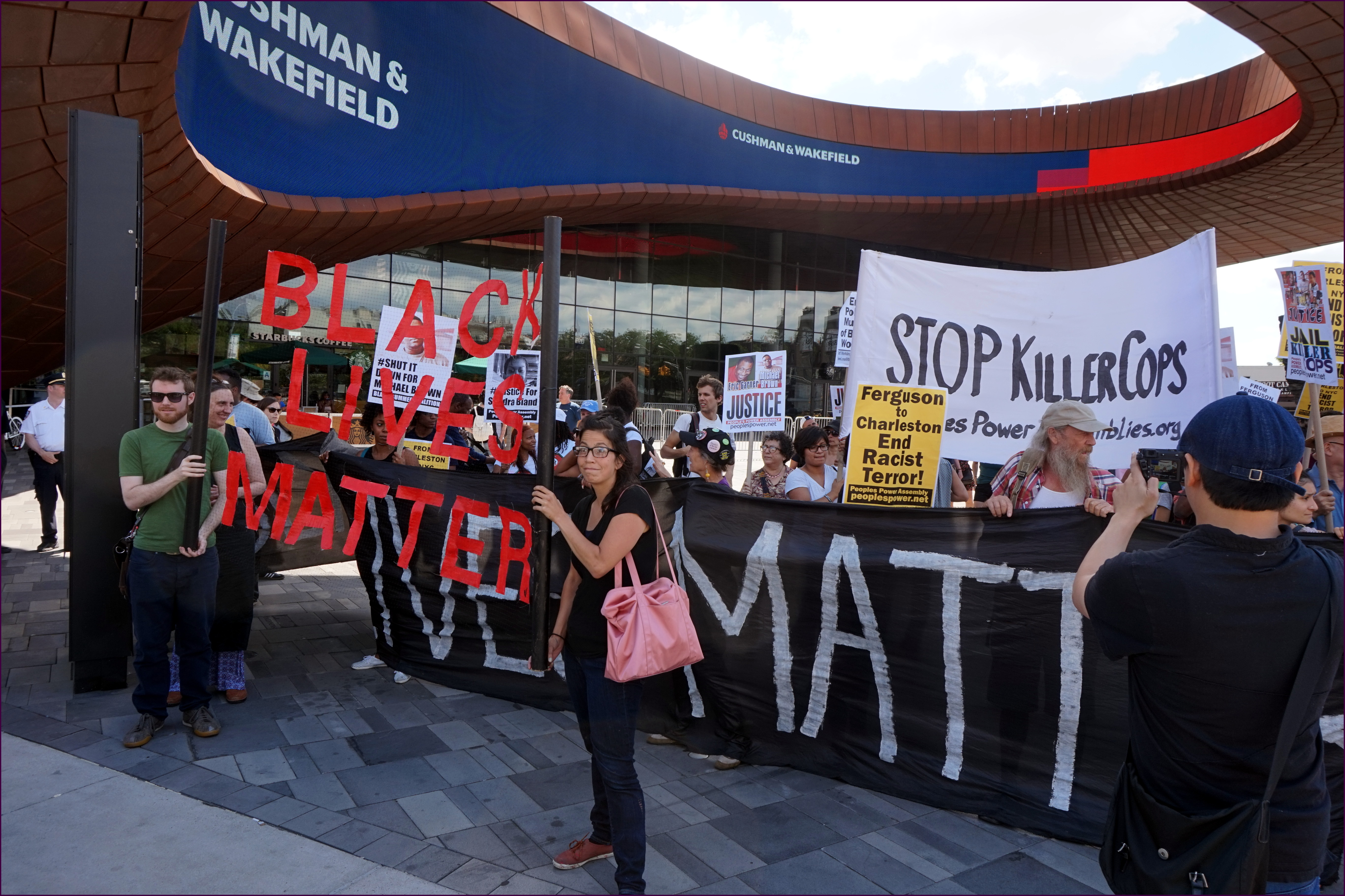
A 2015 commemoration of the 2014 shooting of Michael Brown

In 1991, Rodney King, an African American man, was savagely beaten by four Los Angeles Police officers. The following year, the 1992 Los Angeles riots broke out in response to the acquittal of the police officers involved in the beating. This event brought large amounts of media attention to police brutality towards minorities such as African Americans and Hispanics.

The 2014 shooting of Michael Brown in Ferguson, Missouri, and the ensuing outrage is considered a turning point in the U.S. dialogue of the "war on cops" with the Black Lives Matter movement challenging the legitimacy of the police.

Minority groups in disadvantaged neighborhoods tend to distrust police more and feel that the "law is not on their side".

The role of police in the restriction of youth freedom has also perpetuated anti-police sentiments among young people.

During the George Floyd protests and the wave of racial unrest that followed, a surge in anti-police attacks was reported. According to a 2021 FBI statement, "103 ambush-style attacks on law enforcement officers [took place] this year, which was an increase of 115% from 2020, and resulted in 130 officers being shot. Thirty of those officers were killed." In April 2021, Canadian scholar Temitope Oriola expressed concern tensions between police and African Americans could lead to an "anti-police insurgency", drawing parallels to the armed conflict that took place between 1950 and 1994 in Apartheid South Africa. Oriola noted that the vast majority of anti-police brutality protests have been peaceful, and an insurgency in the United States would be far less violent than one in other countries.

U.S. president Donald Trump has on several occasions condemned the anti-police atmosphere.

==== Examples ====
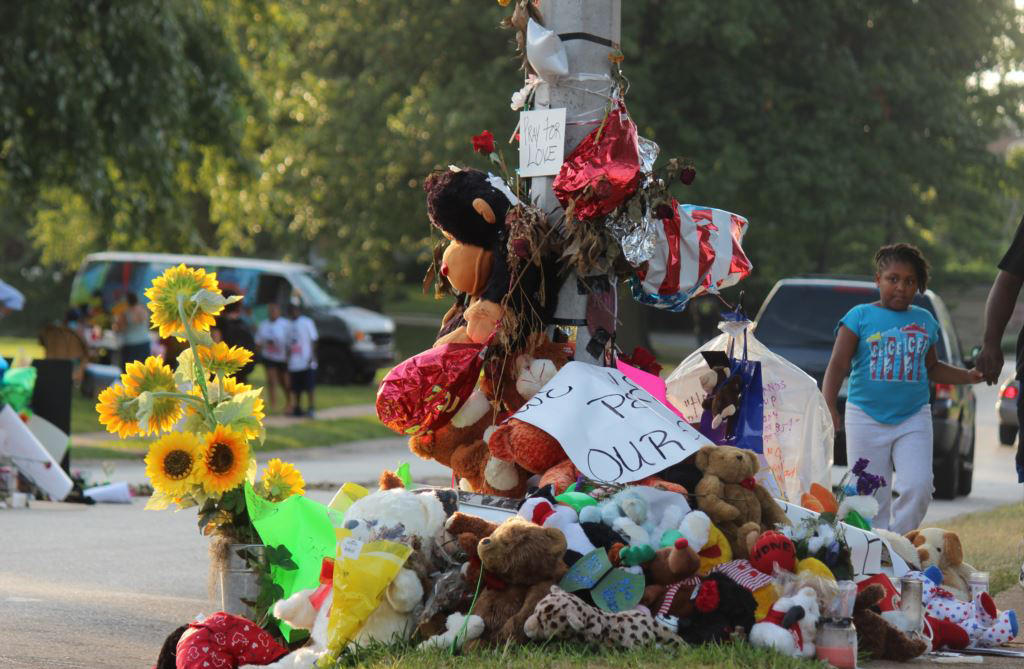
A commemoration for the shooting of Michael Brown in Ferguson, 2014

- The shooting of unarmed African American Michael Brown by a police officer in 2014 caused public outrage in the U.S. and a condemnation of law enforcement's use of force against the marginalised. Culhane, Boman and Schweitzer have pointed out that in the post-Ferguson era, there is a greater preconceived assumption among the public that the police are the perpetrators of unjustified violence rather than the offender being at fault in incidents of police brutality.
- The July 2016 shooting of Philando Castile in Minnesota resulted in a large protest that included vandalism of police headquarters such as covering them with red paint.
- The 2016 shooting of Dallas Police officers in Texas killed 5 officers. The shooting was conducted during an anti-police–brutality protest.
- The 2017 St Louis Protests were a response to the police shooting of Anthony Lamar Smith in 2011. Banners containing anti-police rhetoric were shown; police cars and other property were damaged. Ten officers were injured during the violent protests.
- The 2019 Jersey City shooting was motivated in part by anti-law enforcement beliefs.

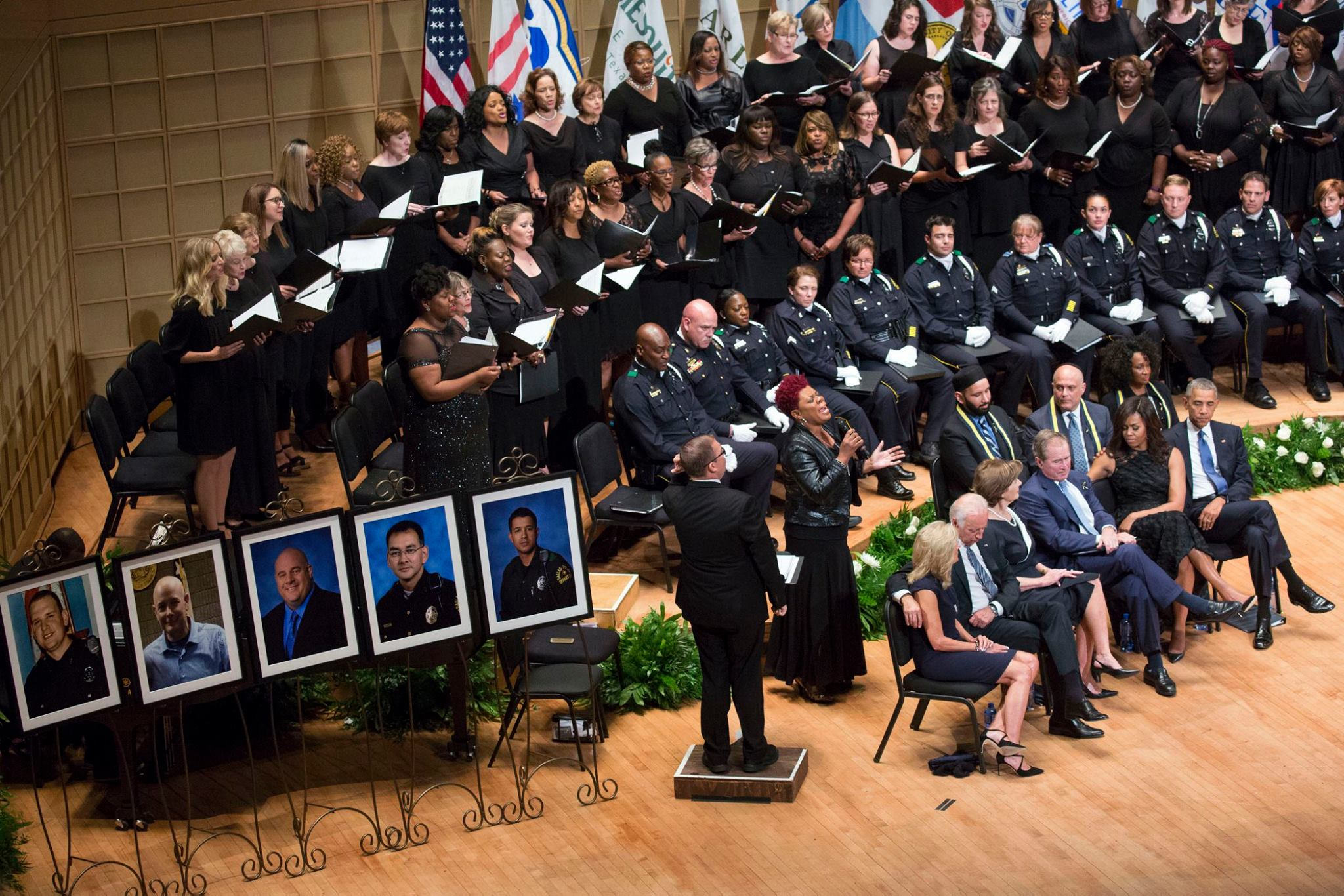
2016 Dallas Police Shooting Memorial Service

- The 2020 boogaloo murders, where members of the movement known as "Boogaloo Bois" murdered two police officers.

==== Media ====
Smartphones, allowing people to capture real-time recordings of confrontations with police and spread them across the internet, have been mentioned in helping extend anti-police sentiment. Anti-police sentiment also manifests in music.

===== Examples =====
- Public Enemy – The late 1980s was a significant time for the hip-hop industry regarding the release of music that was explicit in its social commentary on the corrupt morality of authorities. As such, anti-police views began to be expressed by hip-hop groups such as Public Enemy, who released "Fight the Power" in 1989, holding a harsh mirror to the police force for them to recognise their racial prejudice. Thus, it became an "anthem for the kind of resistance that rap music had already begun to embrace".
- N.W.A – Another notable example of anti-police rhetoric existent in popular culture is N.W.A's song "Fuck tha Police" released in 1988, which was inspired by their personal encounters with law enforcement that involved discrimination. The reception of this song by authority figures was utter discontent, causing the proliferation of tensions between the rap group and the police. On the other hand, its reception with the African American community was powerful, as it "struck a nerve for many people, especially the marginalized communities. They wanted justice, too, but only in fictional songs like 'Fuck tha police' could they seem to find it". Its provocative lyrics have influenced other artists such as Mayhem Mal, who utilised the same title and received backlash for its anti-police undertones.
- Uncle Marda & Maida – The statements in Uncle Marda & Maida's 2014 song "Hands Up" has been described as "a parable about what happens when a marginalised community simply can't take it anymore". The lyrics were anti-police and the music video depicted power inversion.
- Rage Against the Machine – R.A.T.M.'s signature 1992 song, "Killing in the Name", makes numerous references to police brutality, corruption, and institutional racism. The line "Some of those that work forces, are the same that burn crosses" references the phenomenon of some law enforcement officers also being members of the Ku Klux Klan and other white supremacist hate groups in the United States.

==== U.S. police response ====
Police have expressed feeling threatened by violent protesters and attackers, and a dissatisfaction with a larger gap between police and the community.

Some have blamed media for fueling anti-police sentiment. Chuck Cantury Howard Safir identified "a war on police" in his letter to President Barack Obama. Former FBI director James Comey addressed in 2015 by positing that "a chill wind [is] blowing through American law enforcement over the last year… and that wind is surely changing behavior". Academics have theorized that "de-policing" may be seen in America as a response to police dissatisfaction in some areas.

== See also ==
- Contempt of cop – Law enforcement term
- Legal cynicism – Negative perception of law enforcement
- Militarization of police – Law enforcement using combat methods
- Police abolition movement – Political movement
