= General Mayhem: The Killing of Brigadier J =

2026 documentary film by Rob Sixsmith

- Release poster
- Indonesian: Skenario Sang Jenderal
- Directed by: Rob Sixsmith
- Written by: Rob Sixsmith
- Production company: Beach House Pictures
- Distributed by: Netflix
- Release date: September 18, 2026 (United States)
- Running time: 89 minutes
- Countries: Indonesia; Singapore
- Language: Indonesian (Note: With a few dialogue in English.)

General Mayhem: The Killing of Brigadier J (Indonesian: Skenario Sang Jenderal) is a 2026 true crime documentary film directed and written by Rob Sixsmith. Produced by Beach House Pictures, the film investigates the murder of Nofriansyah Yosua Hutabarat (Brigadier J) inside the official residence of Inspector General Ferdy Sambo and examines the subsequent police obstruction of justice. The documentary was released worldwide on Netflix on September 18, 2026.

== Premise ==
The documentary examines the circumstances surrounding the death of Brigadier Nofriansyah Yosua Hutabarat in July 2022 at the Jakarta residence of former inspector general Ferdy Sambo, head of the Internal Affairs Division of the Indonesian National Police. Through archival footage, news coverage, and interviews, the film details the initial cover-up presented by the authorities, the unraveling of the official narrative due to public scrutiny, and the subsequent criminal trials that convicted high-ranking police officials.

== Production ==
The film was produced by the Singapore-based production company Beach House Pictures and directed by British filmmaker Rob Sixsmith, who previously directed documentary projects in Southeast Asia. The documentary utilizes both Indonesian and English languages and features archival court footage and investigative reporting covering the 2022 case.

== Release ==
General Mayhem: The Killing of Brigadier J was released globally on Netflix on September 18, 2026. In Indonesia and select markets, the film was distributed under the alternative title Skenario Sang Jenderal, while in Chinese-speaking territories it was released as 警界乱局：印尼警员命案.

== See also ==
- Murder of Nofriansyah Yosua Hutabarat
- Ice Cold: Murder, Coffee and Jessica Wongso
- Ferdy Sambo
