= Ice Cold: Murder, Coffee and Jessica Wongso =

2023 documentary film by Rob Sixsmith

- Promotional poster
- Directed by: Rob Sixsmith
- Produced by: Jessica Lee Chu En; Joe Yaggi - Field Producer; Bince Mulyono - Production Coordinator
- Cinematography: Charlie Balch; Anggi Frisca; Patrick Lavaud; Jaye Neo; Yadi Sugandi
- Edited by: Razin Ramzi
- Production company: Beach House Pictures
- Distributed by: Netflix
- Release date: 28 September 2023
- Running time: 86 minutes
- Countries: Indonesia; Singapore
- Languages: Indonesian; English

Ice Cold: Murder, Coffee and Jessica Wongso is a 2023 Indonesian-Singaporean true crime documentary film directed by Rob Sixsmith, based on the 2016 murder of Wayan Mirna Salihin, which was allegedly committed by her friend Jessica Kumala Wongso. The film presents the perspectives of various people involved in the case, including Salihin's family members, Wongso's defense, the trial's public prosecutors, witnesses, experts, and journalists. It also comments on the nature of Indonesia's criminal justice system, which those opposing Wongso's conviction deemed flawed.

The film was released on Netflix two years after principal photography, and brought the case back into public attention, leading many to question the validity of Wongso's conviction.

== Summary ==
=== Main content ===
Ice Cold: Murder, Coffee and Jessica Wongso first features Edi Darmawan and Made Sandy Salihin, the father and twin sister of Wayan Mirna Salihin, who in 2016 allegedly died of cyanide poisoning after drinking a Vietnamese iced coffee at Olivier Cafe, located in Jakarta's Grand Indonesia Shopping Town; she had aspirations to start a coffee business herself. Edi said that on the day of the event, Wongso told him she drank a glass of water, which is untrue, affirming to him that she murdered Salihin. Olivier's manager and barista, Devi Siagian and Rangga Saputro, said they suspected Wongso due to her reserved attitude. Salihin was buried the next day, when police told Edi his daughter was poisoned.

The trial quickly gained notoriety, with some calling it the "trial of the century" akin to O. J. Simpson's. News anchor Timothy Marbun cited Wongso and Salihin going to college together in Australia as lending to rumors that they were lesbian, with Wongso jealous of Salihin's marriage. Meanwhile, those on Wongso's side believed she was used as a scapegoat; this shift in opinion was credited to her lawyer Otto Hasibuan, who agreed to join in pro bono. Wongso said she felt constantly pressured by lead prosecutor Shandy Handika, with the media attention affecting her mental health. An interview with the film's director Rob Sixsmith was cut short and perpetually forbidden due to the dialogue turning "too deep." The courtroom was described as a "football stadium", with audiences constantly cheering and exclaiming.

As the trial progressed, tensions between the public prosecutors and defense rose. Australian forensic pathologist Beng Beng Ong, who suggested natural causes, was accused of being paid off. As he did not apply for a work visa, he was deported. The prosecutors said they attempted emotional manipulation to hinder the defense's ability to argue further. Photos circulated online depicting Salihin with a blue complexion, which Atmadja testified as not indicating cyanide, which would cause victims to turn red. The same photos, graded red, re-circulated; he discredited the photos since he saw Salihin having the blue complexion himself. The judge deemed them invalid evidence.

Erasmus Napitupulu of the Institute for Criminal Justice Reform argued Wongso's charge was an example of police and prosecutors having excessive power, which loses the judges of any neutral mindset. With the lack of substantial evidence, Napitupulu posited the evidences were merely speculative and that they concluded it was a murder too early on. Hasibuan opined the trial concluded with bias, with the judges dismissing him every time he presented concrete evidence. Psychologist Reza Indragiri, who testified for Wongso, said "a certain party" bribed him with money to stop talking; in a media interview, Edi confirmed it was him, intendedly as a transport fee for Indragiri. Indragiri thus posited that law enforcement may have been bribed too.

Television stations gave the trial airtimes previously held by sinetrons; the public perception was even compared to sinetrons' black-and-white dualism. Edi argued the case's notoriety and immense sympathy for Salihin stems from her beauty, whereas Wongso has "weird" facial features. In her diary, Wongso wrote the theories against her were illogical. Furthermore, a footage of her entering and exiting Olivier was constantly looped, as the subsequent segments were deleted. At last, Wongso was jailed for up to 20 years; the defense exhausted all appeal options.

=== Specific arguments ===
- The prosecutors noted that Wongso moved a chair and paper bag, obstructing the CCTV, and that she arrived at Olivier 40 minutes early. However, per her WhatsApp interaction with her friends, Wongso thought they had arrived early too, and claimed that her moving bags was to relieve her boredom.
- The conviction proponents noted her calm and calculative attitude with no tears shed; Hiariej found her instances of looking upwards during interviews, and suggested it signified efforts to create fabrications. The prosecutors also cited a psychologist saying Wongso has intermittent explosive and obsessive–compulsive disorder; Edi, on the other hand, noted a forensic expert calling her a "crazy [...] psycho-narcist." That expert also said she physiognomically exhibits childlike attention-seeking and vengeful behaviours, and that her eyes "do not shine" like former American president Jimmy Carter and actress Julia Roberts. Indagiri and fellow psychologist Dewi Haroen noted this was pseudoscientific and lookist. Journalist Fristian Griec who managed to interview Jessica said she exhibits a carefree attitude, debunking the claims that she is calculative.
- Hasibuan questioned whether Wongso's motive was considered; the prosecutors, however, said circumstantial evidences sufficed.
- Toxicologist Slamet Purnomo revealed no autopsy was done due to the Salihins only permitting a sampling of the stomach; thus, any alternate causes of death cannot be examined. Djaja Surya Atmadja, a forensic pathologist, testified that 70 minutes following her death, her stomach tested negative for cyanide. Furthermore, Purnomo stated that several days later her stomach contained 0.2 mg/litre of cyanide, way less than the lethal dose, 50–176 mg/litre. Toxicologist Budi Budiawan noted that cyanide can evaporate; thus, there should have been odour filling all of Olivier.
- Hasibuan found no odour in the bottle which the coffee was transferred to; in addition, this was an example of tampering with evidence.
- Wongso's criminal history in Australia included crashing into a nursing home; officer John Torres noted she had been suicidal. Thus, the perception arose that depressed people like her are more capable to murder. Indragiri refuted these claims, and Hidayat Bostam argued those are separate issues.

== Production ==
Ice Cold: Murder, Coffee and Jessica Wongso was directed by Rob Sixsmith for Beach House Pictures. The film's footage took place from January to October 2016.

Mirna's friend, Hani Juwita Boon, refused to be interviewed and blocked Netflix from contacting her, which later was revealed by Otto Hasibuan during a podcast with Deddy Corbuzier. Krishna Murti, a policeman who worked on the case, also refused to be interviewed. Mirna's husband Arief Soemarko's relative, Steve, said that Soemarko rejected the interview as it opened up his old trauma, and added that there are parties who take advantage of this opportunity to make a content.

== Release and reception ==
The film was aired on Thursday, 28 September, on Netflix. and quickly became the most talked about film in Indonesia. A 5* review from CNN Indonesia stated that the documentary was a provocative drama. but also that "Jakarta, CNN Indonesia -Ice Cold: Murder, Coffee, and Jessica Wongso immediately entered the top of my favorite shows throughout 2023... How could it not be, this film directed by Rob Sixsmith combines my passion for documentaries and thrillers, and is given my favorite ingredients, which are also those of most Indonesians: drama, sensation and mystery."

The trailer for the film was viewed by 44 million people, one of the highest trailer views of a Netflix documentary in any territory, and the film is the first Indonesian documentary to enter the Netflix top ten global film list (Non-English) at position 6 for 2 weeks. It has been the number one film on Netflix Indonesia for the first 3 weeks after release.

The Jakarta Post that assessed the film's overall objectivity through "Adythia Utama, a Jakarta-based documentary filmmaker, assessed that the documentary itself is quite neutral in its presentation. Facts supporting the argument that Jessica is guilty, like her 14 criminal offenses in Australia, are still shown in the latter half of the film. "Every documentary has an angle, and chances of bias always exist," Adythia said to the Post on Thursday. "But I think, at the end, Ice Cold wants to expose the ways in which Indonesia's judicial system is flawed," he added.

The evidence-based presentation of the case resulted in negative sentiments from Indonesians who believe that Wongso's is not the murderer. Liputan 6 review added that the bias in the film was based on the lack of detail in the documentary which included the absence of scenes of Wongso's scratching her hands after Mirna was evacuated and disappearance of Wongso's trousers.

Critically the film was received fairly positively with publications like The Diplomat stating, "While the story polarized Indonesia, with supporters forming teams in favor of either Wongso or Salihin, the time that has ensued since the conviction has allowed for a calmer and cooler review of the events that transpired, something that the new Netflix documentary aims to achieve."

The scene when Jessica Wongso was forbidden from doing an interview in prison became trending on the internet, however Ministry of Law representation, Rika Aprianti, said that they did not received an interview permission from the film crew. A claim that was later heavily questioned as impossible by netizens. Mirna's father, Edi Darmawan Salihin, had received a major spotlight due to this film with few people discussing his own controversy, such as: womanizing, keeping a bottle of cyanide, and insulting Wongso's personality which his employees added that his personality changed after Mirna's death and resulted in massive layoffs of his employees. Indonesian internet users also highlighted the appearance of Ferdy Sambo, a police officer who murdered Brigadir Nofriansyah Yosua Hutabarat, in the documentary. Krishna Murti who at that time held the case became viral again after Wongso said that she was forced to admit to killing Mirna and sign a warrant for her arrest. Otto Hasibuan, a lawyer who at that time defended Wongso, said that he had told her to apply for clemency on the condition that she admit to be guilty, but this was rejected by Wongso who said that she would never admit a mistake that she did not commit and would rather choose imprisonment.

This resulted in public speculation that Jessica Wongso was not the killer and was forcibly imprisoned. The speculation later was countered by Edward "Eddy" Omar Sharif Hiariej, a professor at Faculty of Law of Gadjah Mada University and expert witness at the trial of the case, who said that Jessica is clearly the murderer by including evidence from 9 CCTV recordings and two expert witnesses. He also added that due to the possibility theory that he used along with I Made Gelgel to find out when the cyanide was put into the glass, he stated that all the witnesses were in the same place and only saw Jessica near the coffee. During a podcast with Denny Sumargo, Eddy explained the reason Wongso wasn't allowed to do an interview is because there is some kind of requirement for interviewing prisoners, especially security factors, and speculated that something was violated during the interview.
