= ACAB =

Anti-police acronym

All Cops Are Bastards
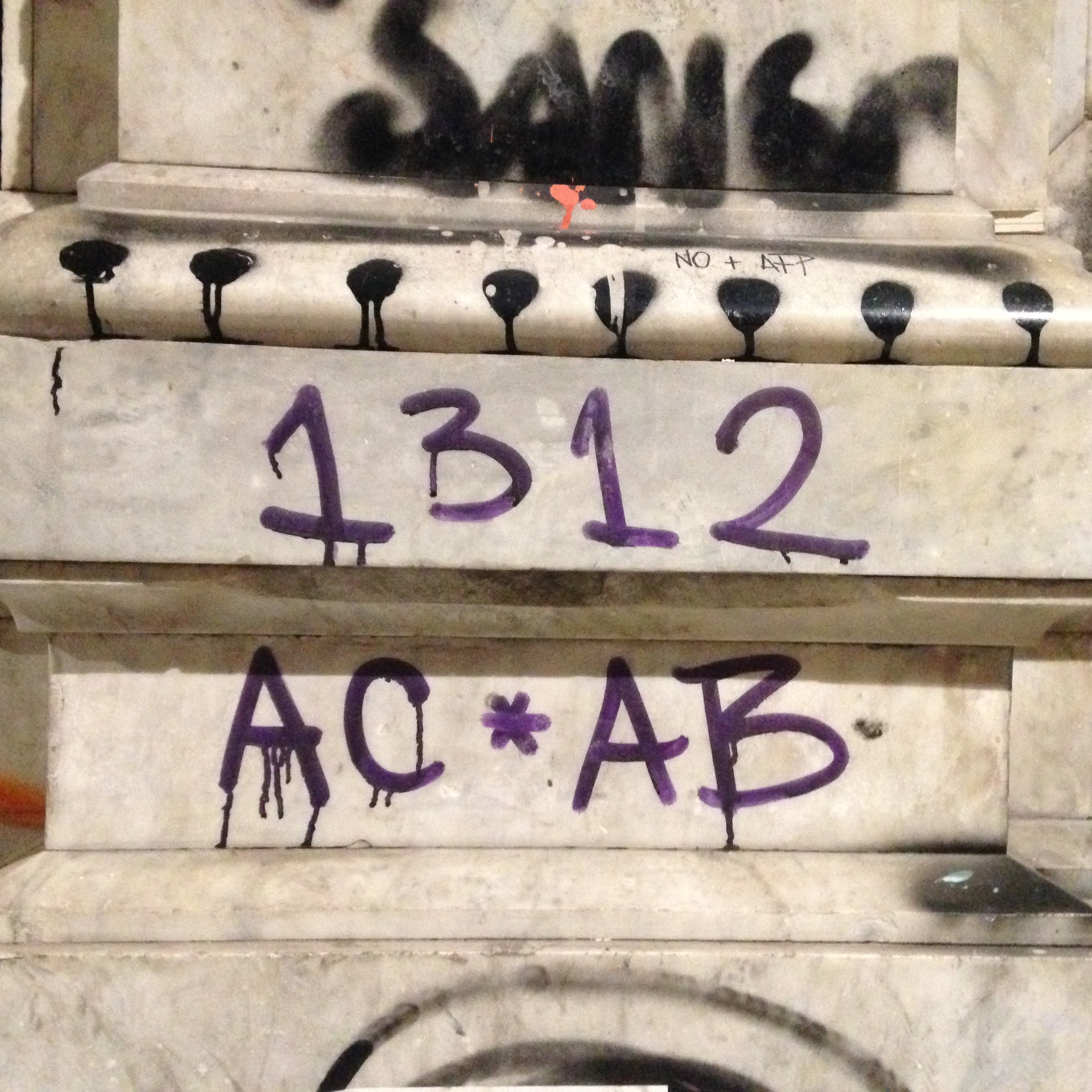
- ACAB (1312) graffiti written during the 2019–2021 Chilean protests
- Origin: England
- Original form: All cops are bastards
- Context: 20th century acronym commonly written as graffiti, origin unknown
- Coined by: Workers on strike
- Meaning: Anti-police sentiment

ACAB, an acronym for all cops are bastards, is a political slogan associated with those opposed to the police and commonly expressed as a catchphrase in graffiti or tattoos. It is sometimes expressed as 1312, with each digit representing the position of the corresponding letter in the English alphabet.

== Background ==
The phrase "all cops are bastards" first appeared in England in the 1920s, then was abbreviated to "ACAB" by workers on strike in the 1940s. The acronym is historically associated with criminals in the United Kingdom. First reported as a prison tattoo in the 1970s, it is commonly rendered as one letter per finger, or sometimes disguised as a small dot across each knuckle. In 1970, the Daily Mirror used ACAB as the headline of an article which stated it was borne by a Hells Angel on the street. Film director Sidney Hayers also used a censored version as the title of his 1972 crime drama All Coppers Are.... In 1977, a Newcastle upon Tyne journalist saw it written on the walls of a prison cell.

During the 1980s, ACAB became an anti-establishment symbol, especially within the punk and skinhead subcultures. It was popularized in particular by the 1982 song "A.C.A.B." by Oi! band the 4-Skins. In later years, ACAB turned into a popular slogan among European football hooligans and ultras, and among anarchist and anti-authoritarian movements across the world. The Anti-Defamation League notes that the phrase sometimes appears alongside hate symbols used by white supremacists, and describes it as "a slogan of long standing in the skinhead culture." They point out that the phrase is used both by racist and anti-racist skinheads: "One cannot assume that the mere appearance of ACAB on its own indicates a tie to or affinity with white supremacy or hatred."

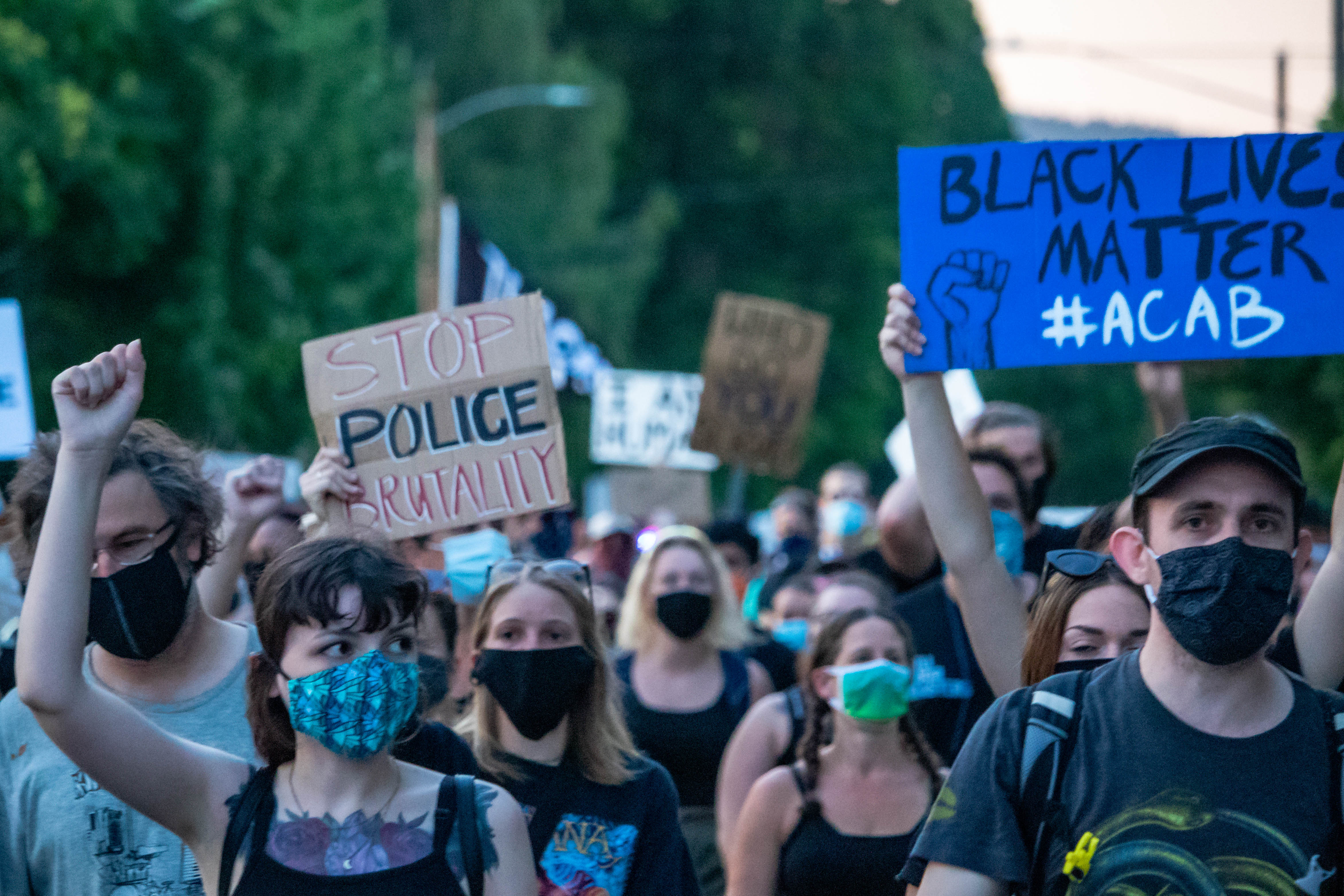
ACAB acronym on a Black Lives Matter placard, 2020

In the wake of the May 2020 murder of George Floyd by the police officer Derek Chauvin, the use of the term ACAB became more frequently used by those who oppose the police. As protests in response to Floyd's murder and discussions about racially motivated police violence spread through the United States, ACAB was more frequently referenced on social media and products bearing the acronym became available. Proponents of the term contended that ACAB means every single police officer is complicit in an unjust system. They argued that police officers, even if they did not take part in police brutality or racism in policing themselves, were still responsible for what their colleagues did because they did not speak out against it or try to stop it.

== Censorship ==
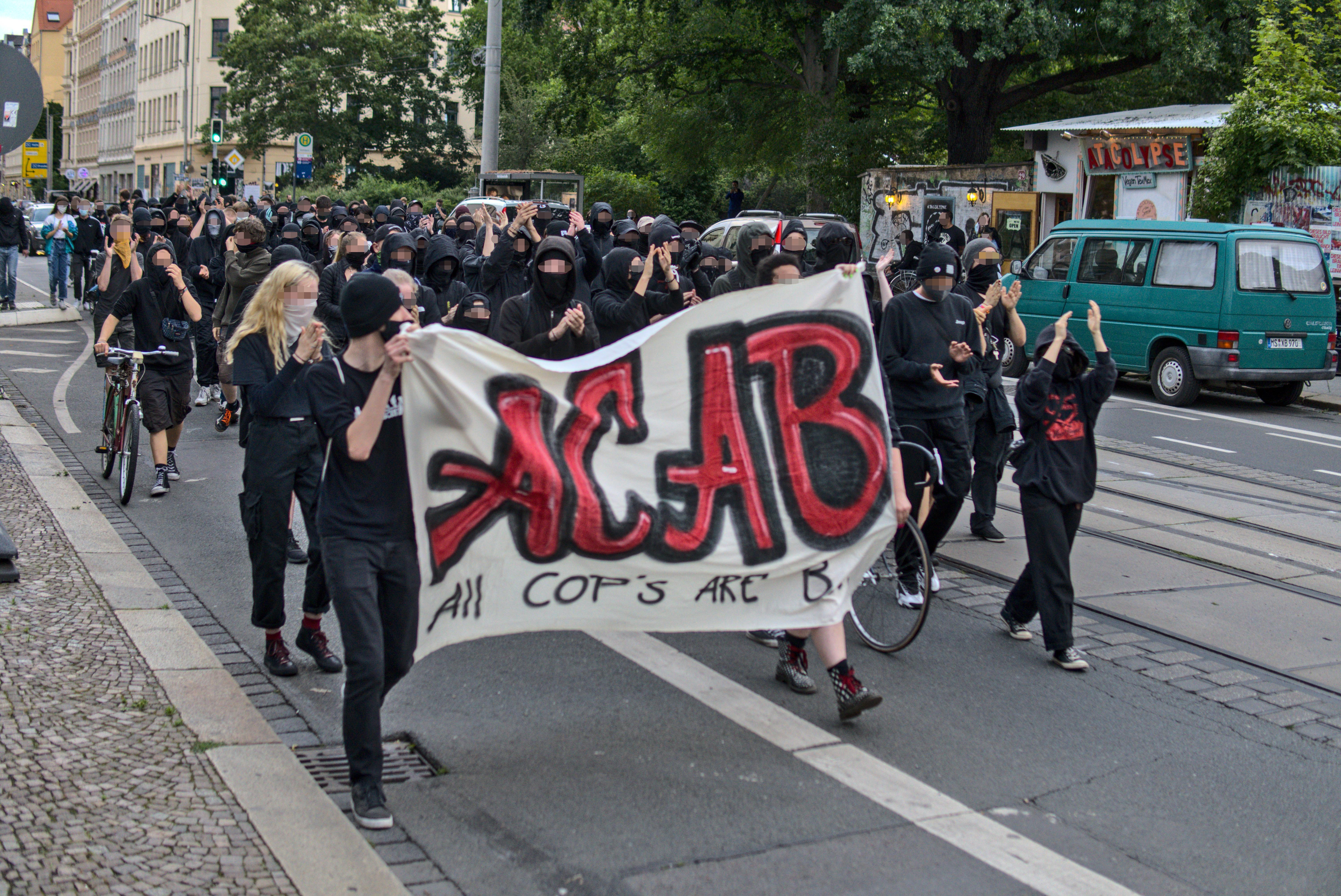
Anarchists in Leipzig, Germany, protesting with a banner reading "ACAB, all cops are b..."

In Germany, usage of the term is a criminal offense when it refers to a single person, but permitted when used to describe a large group of people. Both "ACAB" and "1312" have been deemed justiciable insults by state courts. In 2015, the Federal Constitutional Court ruled in reference to the term "FCK CPS" (read as 'Fuck Cops') that an insult is only punishable when it is directed at a specific, identifiable group, but left interpretation of individual cases to the criminal courts.

French demonstrators shouting "ACAB" in Valence during the 17 October riots

In Austria, the use of ACAB was seen as "violating public decency", which could be punished under administrative law, for example, using an administrative penal order. The fine could be up to 700 euros (or alternatively a week police detention). In 2019, the Austrian Constitutional Court (VfGH) ruled that treating the slogan as a violation of decency, in certain cases, violates the fundamental right to freedom of expression under Article 10 ECHR. The specific case involved a soccer fan who had waved an ACAB flag in the stadium. According to the VfGH, the banner should "primarily refer to the tense relationship between some football fans and the police and to express the negative attitude towards the police as part of the state's regulatory power" and should therefore "not be a concrete 'insult' to certain other people". Therefore, the criticism expressed "should be accepted with a view to the special meaning and function of freedom of expression in a democratic society, taking into account all circumstances of the case".

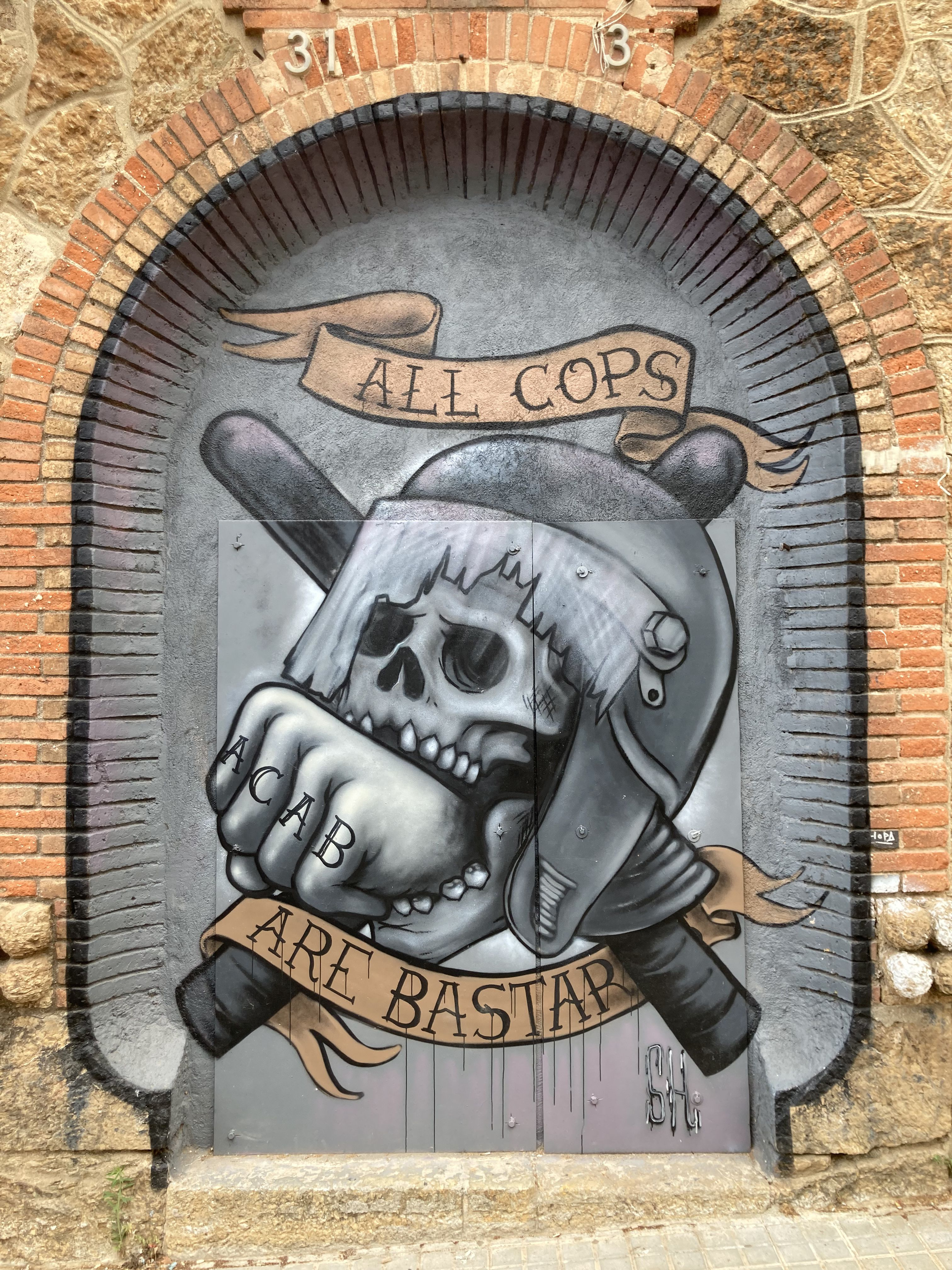
ACAB street art in Barcelona, 2022

In other European countries, there are examples of police action toward people using ACAB in some fashion. Brian Stableford's 2009 Exotic Encounters states that "many years ago" during a fad for wearing ACAB shirts, a British youth was arrested for incitement to riot for wearing one, and ineffectively claimed the shirt stood for "All Canadians Are Bastards". In January 2011, three Ajax football fans in the Netherlands were fined for wearing T-shirts with the numbers 1312 printed on them. On 4 July 2015, a woman in Alicante, Spain, was fined for wearing a T-shirt with the acronym "A.C.A.B." printed on it. On 22 May 2016, a 34-year-old woman in Madrid, Spain, was charged under Article 37 of the Citizen Safety Law for carrying a bag displaying the acronym "A.C.A.B." accompanied by the words "All Cats Are Beautiful". The charges were dropped 3 days later. On 15 September 2017, a man from Karlovac, Croatia posted a photomontage with the message "Fuck da Police A.C.A.B." from his Facebook profile. For this, he was later charged with violating the public order and fined €100 by the Misdemeanor Court in Karlovac. On 4 April 2019, a 26-year-old ice hockey fan was arrested for wearing a T-shirt that had a numeric version of ACAB, 1312. "A.C.A.B." and 1312 are both considered "extremist information" in Belarus.

Prosecution on the grounds of ACAB being offensive is not limited to Europe. In 2018, a group of Persija Jakarta football fans in Indonesia were arrested for displaying a banner with the message "All Cops Are Bastards" on it during the league match day.

Following a 2020 Black Lives Matter protest in Phoenix, Arizona, United States, 15 protesters were charged with assisting a criminal street gang for using the phrase "all cops are bastards" while wearing black clothes and carrying umbrellas. The police officers who arrested them said the protesters were members of "a group known as ACAB All Cops Are Bastards." Criminal charges against the protestors were dropped and a probe characterized the case as "deeply flawed", "insubstantial", and lacking credible evidence in support of the claim that "ACAB" is a gang.

== In popular culture ==
The abbreviation was often used musically in the 1980s. The 4-Skins, a British Oi! punk band, popularized the initialism A.C.A.B. in their 1980s song of the same name. The term has also been used elsewhere in music:

- Austrian band Ja, Panik released on their album Libertatia (2014) a song with the title "A.C.A.B.", in which the acronym is interpreted as "All Cats Are Beautiful"
- German punk band Slime released the song "A.C.A.B." on their influential 1979 album Slime I; it, along with the band's other anti-police songs "are still anthems of the leftist movement" to this day.
- German band The Incredible Herrengedeck in the lyrics of the song "Angst vor Punk"
- German rapper Sun Diego in the song "A.C.A.B." on the album Planktonweedtape (2015); in the song "A.C.A.B. II" on the album Krabbenkoke Tape/SftB (2017); and in the song "A.C.A.B. III" on the EP Planktonweed EP (2022)
- German satirist Jan Böhmermann with his song "Ich hab Polizei" (2015), but negating it by adding an N in front.
- American band the Casualties in their song "1312", the lead single from their 2018 album Written in Blood.

The 2012 Italian drama film ACAB – All Cops Are Bastards follows the work of a group of riot control force policemen and tensions within the community. A follow-up series ACAB: The Series (a.k.a. "Public Disorder") was produced through Netflix and debuted on the streaming service in January 2025.

== See also ==
- Anti-fascism
- Abolish ICE
- Anti-police sentiment
- August 2025 Indonesian protests
- Blue Lives Matter
- Blue wall of silence
- Collective responsibility
- Criminal justice reform
- Criminal tattoo
- Defund the police
- Fuck tha Police
- George Floyd protests, in which A.C.A.B. was commonly referenced and discussed
- HWDP, the Polish equivalent
- List of symbols designated by the Anti-Defamation League as hate symbols
- Police abolition movement
- Prison industrial complex
