= CHWDP =

Polish anti-police acronym

CHWDP HWDP
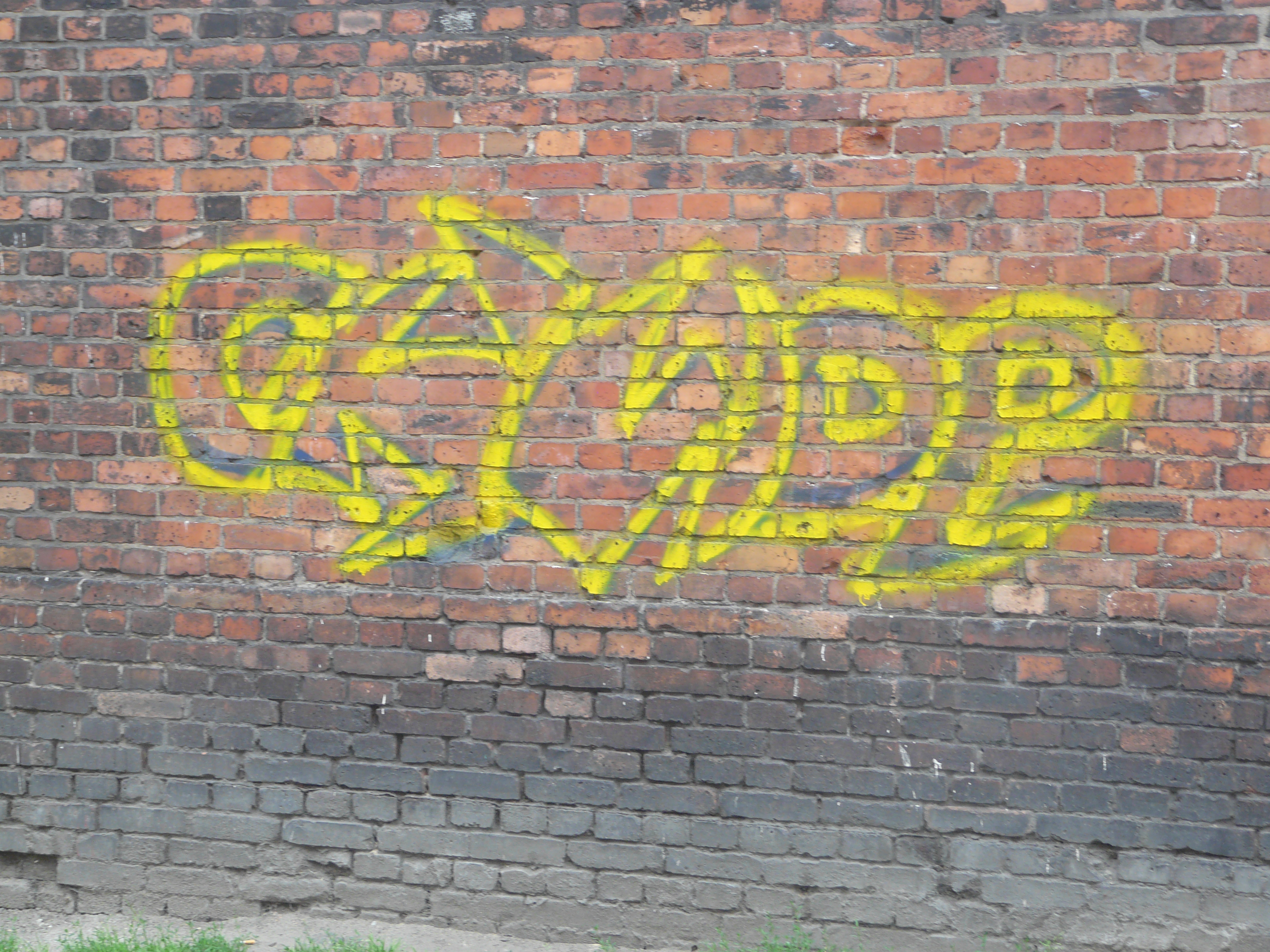
- A stylised CHWDP graffito on a wall in the Nikiszowiec suburb of Katowice
- Origin: Poland
- Original form: Chuj w dupę policji
- Context: Anti-police slogan
- Meaning: lit. '(Put a) dick up the police's arse'

CHWDP or HWDP [xavudɛˈpɛ] is a frequently used Polish acronym or initialism of the Polish phrase chuj w dupę policji, literally meaning "(put a) dick up the police's ass." This anti-authoritarian and anti-police slogan, often written on walls in Poland, is used as a vulgar form of provocation against the police and authorities.

The initialism was largely popularised by Polish hip hop music and Polish anarchists, where it is often used in lyrics and as graffiti. It is a specific expression of protest against the authorities, and against "the system" in general. It is more or less analogous to the English language expressions ACAB and “fuck the police”.

In Polish orthography, Ch is a digraph. However as chuj is pronounced the same as huj, the acronym HWDP is commonly seen.

== Popularity ==
The slogan is already very widespread in Poland, and its popularity is spreading to other countries, most notably Slovakia and Germany.

=== Alternate expansions ===
One of the ways in which the popularity of the initialism is easily noticed is that it was given many alternative expansions. Still, the basic meaning is generally known. Others are merely jokes that are sometimes used to avoid awkward situations and to relieve the tension, e.g. when people who propagate this abbreviation talk with the police or by the policemen who want to avoid embarrassment when they are asked to expand the abbreviation during interviews.

=== Spread on the Internet ===
However, the popularity of this initialism is not limited to it being spraypainted on the walls in Poland. In fact, the initialism has also spread among the Internet users, both Polish and foreign.

== Gallery ==
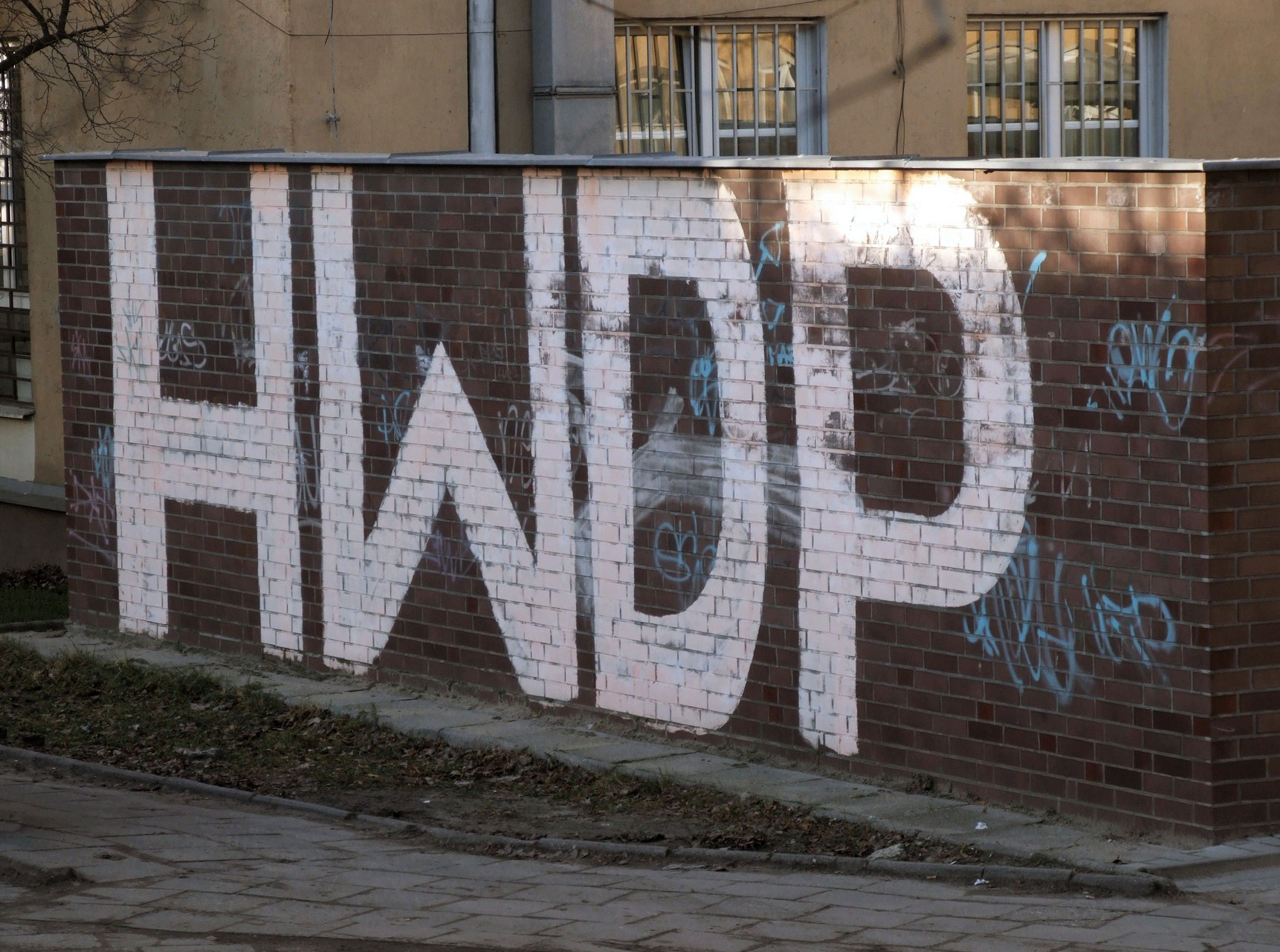
A two-metre-tall inscription of HWDP, on a wall in Zielona Góra

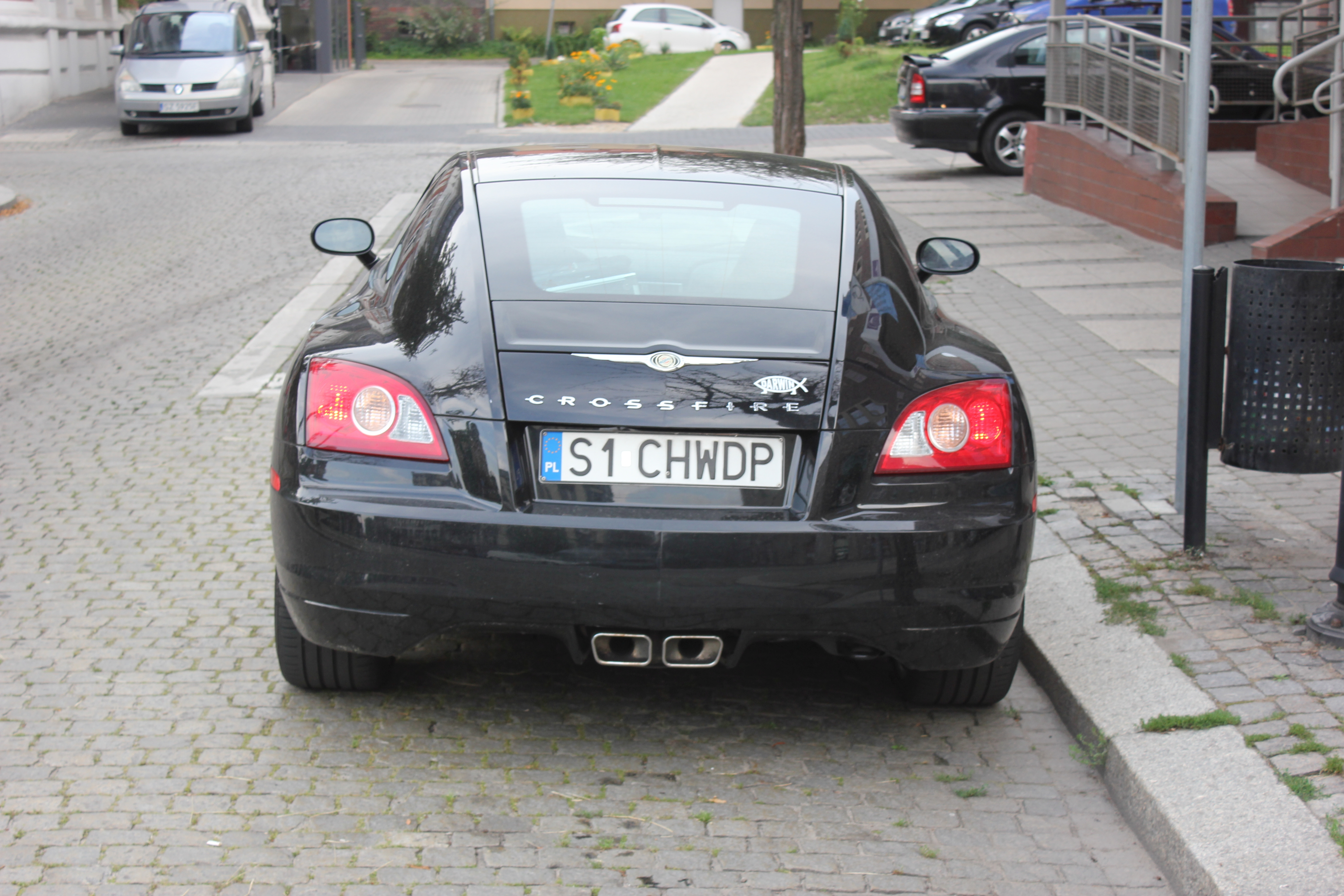
A Chrysler Crossfire in Poland with CHWDP license plate

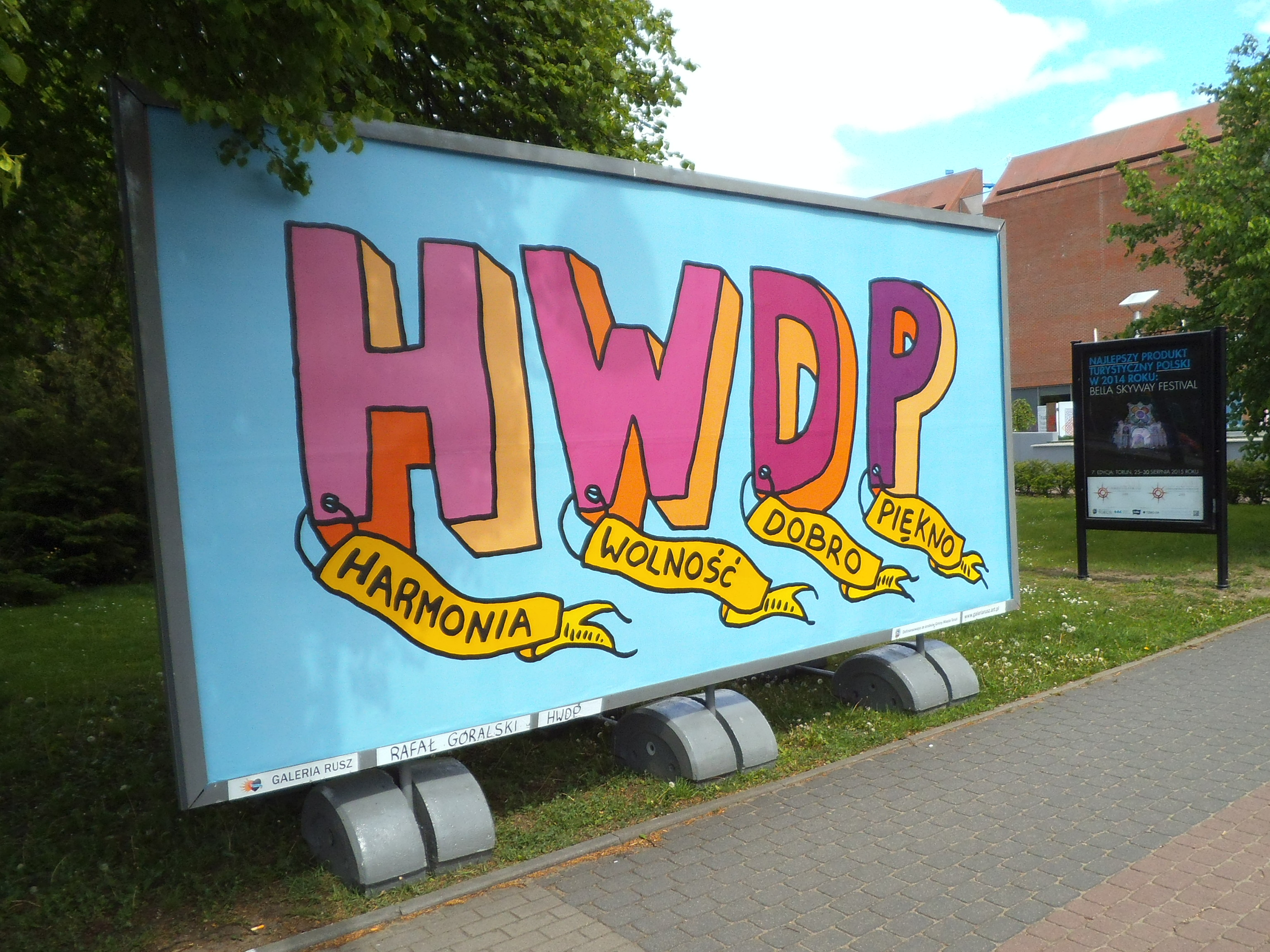
Sign in Toruń, claiming the initialism stands for harmonia, wolność, dobro, piękno (harmony, freedom, goodness, beauty)

== See also ==
- ACAB
