= Otto Hasibuan =

Indonesian lawyer (born 1955)

Deputy Coordinating Ministry for Legal, Human Rights, Immigration, and Correction
- Incumbent
- Assumed office 21 October 2024
- President: Prabowo Subianto
- Preceded by: Office established

Personal details
- Born: Otto Hasibuan; 5 May 1955 (age 71) Pematangsiantar, North Sumatra, Indonesia
- Party: Independent
- Spouse: Norwati Damanik
- Children: 4
- Relatives: Jessica Mila (daughter in law)
- Education: Gadjah Mada University; University of Technology Sydney
- Occupation: Lawyer; businessman

Otto Hasibuan (born 5 May 1955) is an Indonesian lawyer and businessman. He is known for being Jessica Kumala Wongso's lawyer in the Murder of Wayan Mirna Salihin's case and as Setya Novanto's attorney in his electronic ID card (E-KTP) corruption scandal.

== Early life and education ==
Hasibuan was born on 5 May 1955 in Pematangsiantar, North Sumatra, as the youngest of the ten children. His father whom has Hasibuan family name was referred by him as an idol while his mother whom family name is Boru Siahaan was referred by him as a teacher. Her older sister, Sontang, was a lawyer who served as head of Jessica Wongso's lawyer team during the Murder of Wayan Mirna Salihin's case. Hasibuan was raised and completed his formal education in North Sumatra and was known for being active in an organization. He attended the Faculty of Law at Gadjah Mada University before receiving his by master's degree from University Technology of Sydney, where he studied comparative law. He then earned his Doctor of Philosophy degree from Gadjah Mada University.

== Personal life ==
Hasibuan is married to Norwati Damanik in 1984 and has had four children: Putri Linardo, Lionie Petty, Natalia Octavia, and Yakup Putra Hasibuan. Their only son, Yakup, is a lawyer who was graduated from University of Indonesia and New York University School of Law, and is married to actress Jessica Mila on 6 May 2023.

== Career ==
Hasibuan started his career as a lawyer and joined Persatuan Advokat Indonesia, and was appointed to be commissioner and secretary there. In 1986, Hasibuan became Jakarta's deputy secretary at Ikatan Advokasi Indonesia and was appointed as chairman of the West Jakarta branch.

In 1995, Hasibuan was appointed as deputy of general secretary of Ikatan Advokasi Indonesia and was appointed as chairman for two period from 2003 until 2012. He also lead Perhimpunan Advokat Indonesia for two period from 2005 until 2015, and received the title of honorary professor from Jayabaya University in October 2014 for his services and dedication for 32 years in upholding law and justice in Indonesia. Hasibuan founded Otto Hasibuan & Associates and became a lecturer in several university. In 2016, he became a defendant of Jessica Wongso in the Murder of Wayan Mirna Salihin's case and became attorney for Setya Novanto in electronic ID card (E-KTP) corruption case a year later. He owned golf business, restaurant, and entertainment venue at Senayan Avenue by Ottolima.
