= Violating public decency =

Criminal offence in Austrian law

In Austria, violating public decency (German: Anstandsverletzung) is display of an act that is considered a violation of the generally recognized principles of decency to be observed in public.

== Background ==
Acting in a manner that is perceived as violating public decency is punishable under administrative law, the sentences are proscribed by the respective state police or state security laws of the Austrian states in conjunction with the Austrian Administrative Criminal Law.

A key condition is that the criminal behavior occurs in public (i.e. in a group of people in a public setting). This means that beyond the circle of those involved, other people have the opportunity to perceive the behavior. Examples of decency violations include: For example, urinating in public, chanting the slogan "A.C.A.B." or flashing the finger. Prosecutions of decency are primarily carried out or initiated by the federal police. The minimum penalty is an organ punishment order, which is less than a violation of decency as defined by a disruption of public order.

In both Vienna and Graz young men belched or farted loudly in the presence of police officers and were fined €70 and €50 respectively.
