= Murder of Wayan Mirna Salihin =

2016 murder in Jakarta, Indonesia

Wayan Mirna Salihin
- Born: 30 March 1988; Jakarta, Indonesia
- Died: 6 January 2016 (aged 27); Jakarta, Indonesia
- Cause of death: Cyanide poisoning (contentious)
- Occupation: Graphic designer
- Known for: Murder victim
- Spouse: Arief Soemarko (m. 2015)

On 6 January 2016, Wayan Mirna Salihin died in Abdi Waluyo Hospital after drinking a Vietnamese iced coffee at the Olivier Cafe in the Grand Indonesia shopping mall in Jakarta. According to the police, cyanide poisoning was most likely the cause of Mirna's death. Police charged Jessica Kumala Wongso with her murder. Wongso was found guilty of the murder and was sentenced to 20 years. Wongso's appeal was later rejected by the higher court.

The case became the most famous and phenomenal murder case in 2016 in Indonesia, with the Indonesian media covering the case extensively. The ruling of the case was televised on national television and watched by millions of Indonesians.

== Background ==
Born in 1988, Mirna Salihin was the daughter of Edi Darmawan Salihin, a Chinese Indonesian businessman, and Ni Ketut Sianti. She had just recently married Arief Soemarko weeks before her death.

== Murder investigation ==
At 3:33 p.m. on 6 January 2016, 27-year-old Jessica Kumala Wongso arrived at Grand Indonesia shopping mall in Jakarta to meet her friends at 5 p.m., including Salihin. After making a reservation at the Olivier Cafe and doing some shopping, Wongso returned to the cafe at 4:14 p.m. and ordered drinks, including the Vietnamese iced coffee that allegedly killed Salihin. Wongso waited until Salihin arrived at 5:16 p.m. and during this time the drinks were hidden from the view of the security camera with shopping bags Wongso had placed on the table. Soon after arriving, Salihin took a sip of the coffee and started having seizure-like symptoms. Arief Soemarko, her husband, rushed her by car to Abdi Waluyo Hospital in Menteng, Central Jakarta, where she was later pronounced dead at 6:30 p.m.

According to the autopsy conducted at Kramat Jati Police Hospital on 10 January, evidence of bleeding was found in Salihin's stomach.

On 30 January 2016, Wongso, a former permanent resident of Australia, was charged with the premeditated murder of Wayan Mirna Salihin and was taken into police custody pending trial. The Australian Federal Police handed over confidential files regarding Wongso's psychological state, amongst them a restraining order against her made by an ex-boyfriend, to Indonesian authorities. Wongso's lawyer Yudi Wibowo denied her client's involvement in Salihin's death.

== Trial, verdict, and appeal ==
The trial began on 15 June 2016, approximately a month after Jessica Kumala Wongso was named a suspect. The nearly 5 month (135-day) trial was broadcast live and became a national spectacle.

On 28 September, Salihin's twin, Sandy, said that Wongso sent her news about poison after Salihin's death. Wongso said that she was confused about what happened to Salihin and stated that she did not suspect anyone. Her colleague, Kristie Louise Charter, stated in court that Wongso has two personalities which contrast with each other and added that she was used to manipulating people to gain sympathy and would be very angry if the attention could not be gained.

On 27 October, Wongso was found guilty of the murder of Wayan Mirna Salihin by putting cyanide poison into her coffee and was sentenced to 20 years in prison.

The Jakarta Post said that "In line with the indictment, the judges concluded that Jessica murdered Mirna in revenge for previously telling Jessica to break up with Patrick O'Connor, her former Australian boyfriend."

After a lengthy appeal first being rejected at The Jakarta High court and then again in the Supreme Court presided over by Judges Artidjo Alkostar, Salman Luthan and Sumardiyatmo unanimously turned down Jessica's cassation appeal. "[We] reject the cassation," said the Supreme Court spokesman Suhadi as quoted by tribunnews.com.

On 18 August 2024, after approximately serving for 8 years in detention, Jessica Kumala Wongso was released on parole.

== Documentary film ==
Netflix's documentary, Ice Cold: Murder, Coffee and Jessica Wongso, aired on 28 September 2023. The film features live and exclusive interviews with Jessica as well as several other interviewees, namely Mirna's father and twin sister, Jessica's lawyer, and journalists who explored the case. The documentary was produced by Beach House Pictures, one of Asia's largest independent production houses. CNN Indonesia reviewed the documentary as "provocative," which may create uproar, especially due to the film's depiction of the Indonesian justice system that has gained public scrutiny in recent years.
