= Murder of Nofriansyah Yosua Hutabarat =

2022 murder of Indonesian police officer

- Location: Duren Tiga, South Jakarta, Indonesia
- Date: 8 July 2022 c. 17:00 WIB (UTC+07:00)
- Target: Police Brigadier Nofriansyah Yosua Hutabarat
- Attack type: Shooting
- Deaths: Nofriansyah Yosua Hutabarat
- Perpetrators: Police Inspector General Ferdy Sambo; 2nd Patrolman Richard Eliezer Pudihang Lumiu; Police Chief Brigadier Ricky Rizal; Kuwat Ma'ruf; Putri Candrawati

Nofriansyah Yosua Hutabarat
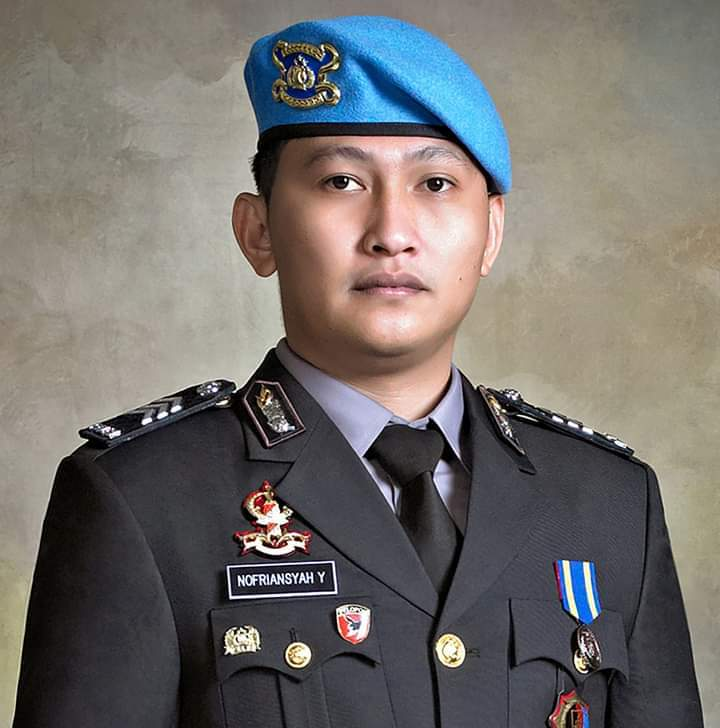
- Portrait of Brigadier Nofriansyah Yosua Hutabarat
- Born: 29 November 1994; Jambi, Indonesia
- Died: 8 July 2022 (aged 27); Jakarta, Indonesia
- Cause of death: Gunshot wounds
- Burial place: Simpang Yanto Cemetery, Sungai Bahar, Muaro Jambi Regency, Jambi
- Occupation: Police officer
- Parents: Samuel Hutabarat (father); Rosti Simanjuntak (mother)
- Police career
- Allegiance: Indonesia
- Department: Mobile Brigade Corps
- Branch: Indonesian National Police
- Service years: 2012–2022
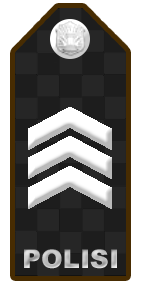
- Rank: Police Brigadier

The murder of Nofriansyah Yosua Hutabarat (sometimes also named as Joshua Hutabarat or Brigadier J), a 27-year-old Indonesian National Police officer, occurred on 8 July 2022 in Jakarta. The ensuing investigation included allegations of an affair, missing CCTV footage, and an attempted cover-up. The chairman of Indonesia Police Watch described the events as "the worst scandal in the police's history".

In August 2022, Inspector General Ferdy Sambo, Hutabarat's former boss and the head of internal affairs for the Indonesian National Police, was charged with Hutabarat's murder. Also charged were Sambo's wife and three other people, two of whom were police officers. Sambo was accused of ordering a subordinate to commit the premeditated proxy murder of Hutabarat.

The trial, which began on 17 October 2022, resulted in guilty verdicts for all five defendants. On 13 February 2023, Sambo was sentenced to death, while his four co-defendants were sentenced to terms of imprisonment. In August 2023, Sambo's sentence was reduced to life imprisonment and the others' prison sentences were shortened. Six former police officers implicated in the cover-up also received prison sentences.

== Victim ==
Nofriansyah Yosua Hutabarat was born on 20 November 1994 in Jambi, Indonesia, to Samuel Hutabarat (born 1966) and Rosti Simanjuntak (born 1968). He has an older sister, Yuni Artika Hutabarat (born 1988), and a younger brother, Mahareza Rizky Hutabarat (born 2000).

Hutabarat was raised at Suka Makmur, a village in Sungai Bahar districts on Muaro Jambi Regency. After completing high school, he attended a test for police officers in Jambi in 2012. He later became a member of the elite Mobile Brigade Corps and, in 2019, was selected to be Sambo's aide-de-camp. Hutabarat was scheduled to graduate from the Faculty of Law in Universitas Terbuka (Open University; UTI) in August 2022.

== Murder ==
Hutabarat was shot at the Jakarta home of Inspector General Ferdy Sambo, head of internal affairs of the Indonesian National Police, on 8 July 2022 at approximately 17:00 Western Indonesian Time. Sambo and Hutabarat had travelled from Magelang with Richard Eliezer (another subordinate of Sambo's) and Sambo's wife Putri Candrawathi. Sambo ordered Eliezer to shoot Hutabarat after Hutabarat allegedly sexually harassed Candrawathi. After the shooting, Hutabarat was transported by ambulance to a hospital, where he was pronounced dead. News of the shooting was delayed until 11 July 2022. Initially, the defendants claimed that Hutabarat had been killed in a gunfight when Eliezer shot him in self-defense.

== Controversy ==
On 9 July 2022, Hutabarat's body arrived in his family home in Jambi, but the police did not allow family members to open the casket and take pictures of the body. After discussions, the police eventually allowed a few close family members to open the casket. The family alleged that the police only gave them a very short time to view Hutabarat's body. The relatives reportedly discovered multiple bruises, facial incisions, finger injuries, and a burn mark on his body.

On 11 July 2022, the relatives alleged that hundreds of police officers, in a bus and 10 cars, were intimidating them by "encircling" their houses and demanding that the family not record any photos and videos. On the same day, Brigadier General Hendra Kurniawan, who represented Indonesian National Police when returning Hutabarat's body to his family, stated that he didn't allow photos and video recordings to be made because the case was related to sexual violence, as Hutabarat allegedly harassed Candrawathi. Later, the family alleged that Brigadier General Hendra Kurniawan was intimidating the family by preventing them from opening the casket. The family buried Hutabarat without any police ceremony on the same day.

On 18 July 2022, Hutabarat family's lawyer went to the police to report premeditated murder of Hutabarat. Hutabarat's family contested the police account of events, claiming he was killed in a "premeditated murder" after being tortured over an alleged affair with Sambo's wife. The police account of the shooting was also questioned by the family's legal team, doubting that Hutabarat, a trained marksman, would miss with all seven shots he fired during the gunfight, and questioning why he had been shot with a Glock 17 pistol – an unlikely weapon for a junior officer.

Hutabarat was also said to have received death threats, including the day before he was killed. Contacts and messages from his mobile phones had also been deleted, while CCTV cameras at the house were initially said to be out of order before footage was uncovered from around the crime scene. Hutabarat's family lawyer also alleged that the WhatsApp of Hutabarat's close family members had been hacked, and his mobile phone was missing. On 22 July, the police clarified that the Hutabarat's missing mobile phone was still being analyzed by the Forensics Division.

The controversy prompted the national police to intervene, with police chief General Listyo Sigit Prabowo taking over the investigation, forming a special team including members of the National Human Rights Commission and Police Commissions. Sambo was suspended on 18 July 2022, while three police generals and 25 officers were reportedly transferred for interfering with the investigation. Indonesia's Coordinating Minister for Political, Legal and Security Affairs, Mahfud MD, said the result of the second autopsy would be made public.

On 27 July, Hutabarat's body was exhumed and subjected to a second, independently scrutinised autopsy at Sungai Bahar General Hospital in Muaro Jambi. On 22 August, the second autopsy showed that all wounds on Hutabarat's body were gunshot wounds, and that there were no torture marks on his body, as had been alleged by his family's legal team.

After the autopsy, Hutabarat's body was reburied in a police ceremony. Candrawathi criticized the ceremony, claiming that a police burial ceremony should not be given to police officers who had committed a crime. On 28 July, Candrawathi claimed to be suffering from heavy trauma and was being treated by psychologists due to Hutabarat's alleged harassment.

== Suspects ==
=== Murder charges ===
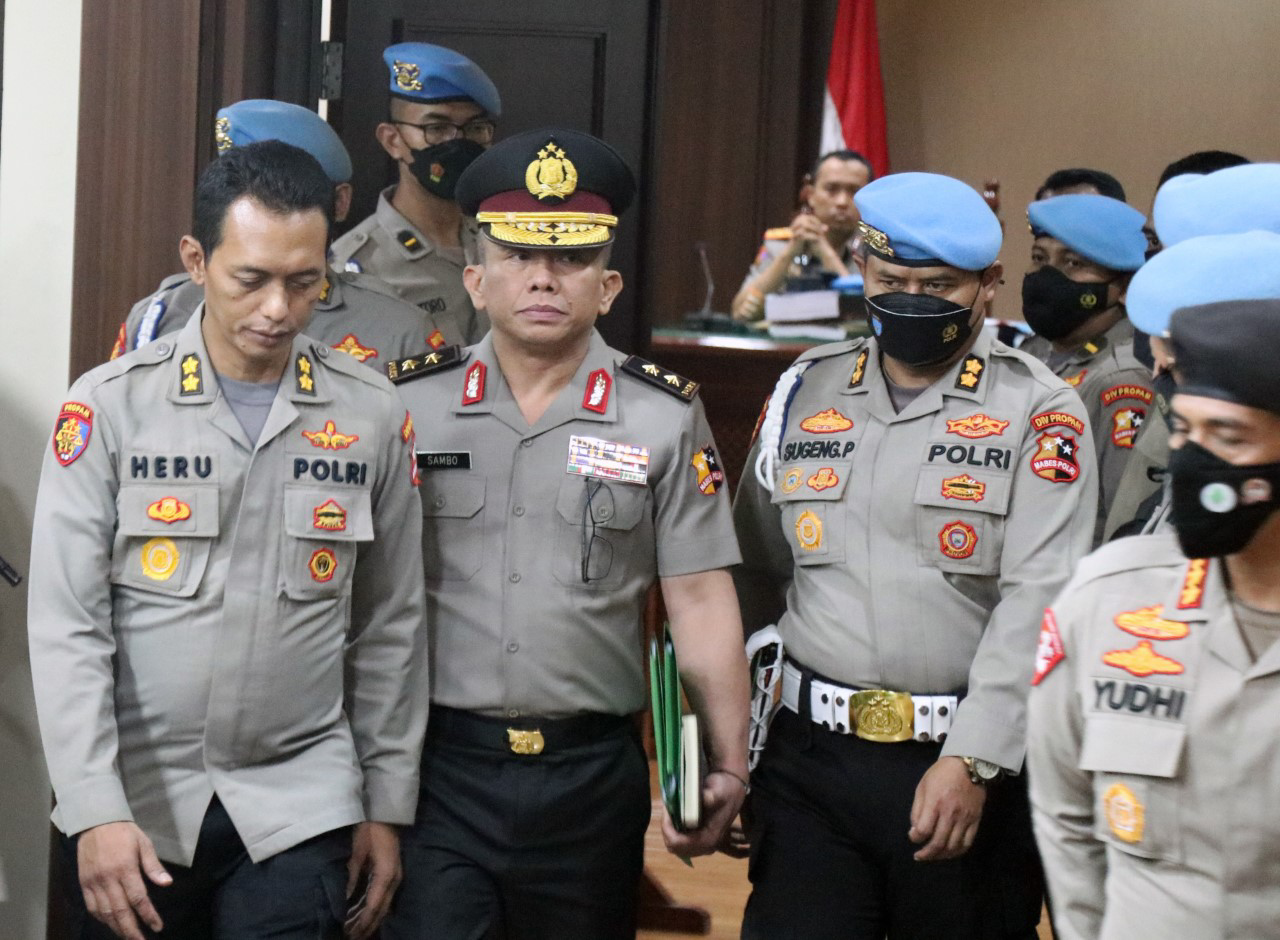
Ferdy Sambo upon facing code of ethics trial on 26 August 2022

On 4 August 2022, Eliezer was charged with murder after his initial self-defense explanation was overruled. On 8 August, he applied for justice collaborator status under the Indonesian witness protection program.

On 7 August 2022, Kuat Ma'ruf, Candrawathi's personal assistant, was charged with premeditated murder. The police stated that Ma'ruf had planned to flee. Ma'ruf allegedly knew about the plan to murder Hutabarat but did not report the plan to the authorities. He had allegedly threatened to murder Hutabarat in Magelang with knives a few days before the shooting. Ma'ruf was also present when Sambo ordered Eliezer to shoot Hutabarat.

On 8 August 2022, Brigadier Ricky Rizal, one of Candrawathi's bodyguard, was arrested and charged with premeditated murder. Rizal allegedly was present at the shooting. Like Ma'ruf, Rizal allegedly knew about the plan to murder Hutabarat and refused to report the crime to the authorities.

On 9 August 2022, Sambo was taken into custody and charged with premeditated murder.

It was later alleged that Sambo had promised Eliezer immunity from prosecution if he told Sambo's version of the shooting. Despite these assurances, Eliezer continued to be the sole suspect for the murder, prompting him to provide the police with a more accurate testimony that contradicted Sambo's version of events. Sambo had orchestrated the murder, and afterwards had fired multiple pistol shots into a wall in an attempt to show a gunfight had led to Hutabarat's death.

On 15 August, Indonesian Witness and Victim Protection Agency approved Eliezer to act as a justice collaborator, and he was taken into the witness protection program. The agency rejected Candrawathi's request to be a justice collaborator since her testimonies contained discrepancies.

On 19 August 2022, it was reported that Candrawathi was also facing a primary charge of premeditated murder, and a secondary charge of murder. Candrawathi claimed that she had been sexually violated by Hutabarat; a few days earlier, police stopped their investigation concerning the alleged sexual harassment, as there were no criminal actions.

On 26 August 2022, Sambo was dishonorably discharged or dismissed (PTDH, Pemberhentian Tidak Dengan Hormat) from the police force. A few days before his dismissal, Sambo had attempted to resign, a letter of which was rejected by the police chief General. Hutabarat's lawyer alleged that Sambo's resignation attempt was because Sambo opted to be honorably dismissed and retain his pension. Sambo attempted to appeal the dismissal decision, but was denied.

=== Police scandal ===
On 22 August 2022, the Indonesian National Police transferred 24 officers, including six middle- to high-ranking individuals implicated in the incident now facing dishonourable discharge, for violating the police code of ethics. Of 83 officers who allegedly violated the code following Hutabarat's shooting, 35 received recommendations for incarceration while 15 were detained over code violations. Sugeng Teguh Santoso, chairman of Indonesia Police Watch, told The Jakarta Post: "This is the worst scandal in the police's history. Imagine 62 people who were supposed to enforce the law voluntarily breaking the law and jeopardizing their future."

=== Obstruction of justice ===
As of 2 September 2022, six high ranking police officers have been charged with obstruction of justice. The six police officers allegedly fabricated events and manipulated evidence. The high-ranking officers are: Brigadier General Hendra Kurniawan, Adjunct Commissioner Irfan Widyanto, Chief Commissioner Agus Nurpatria, Adjunct Chief Commissioner Arif Rachman Arifin, Police Commissioner Baiquni Wibowo, and Police Commissioner Chuck Putranto. Previously, the police clarified that Sambo has not been charged with obstruction of justice.

On 2 September 2022, the ethical board of Indonesian National Police dismissed Putranto and Wibowo without honor. On the same day, Sambo also claimed that Kurniawan and Nurpatria did not participate in the destruction of the DVR of the CCTV close to Sambo's home. On 7 September 2022, Nurpatria was dismissed without honor.

On 5 September 2022, police chief General Prabowo stated that the police had received reports that three Regional Chief of Police had also participated in the coverup.

== Reactions ==
=== Public ===
On 22 July, a small group gathered on Bundaran HI in Jakarta to light 1,000 candles demanding justice for Hutabarat. After gathering for 30 minutes, the police peacefully dispersed the gathering, citing violation of the law as Bundaran HI is a prohibited location for public gatherings.

On 27 July, an anonymous contributor to Indonesian Wikipedia was reported to the police for editing Police Inspector General Fadil Imran's Wikipedia article to allege that Imran had been bribed by Sambo.

On 26 August, Masril, a man from Pekanbaru, Riau, was arrested for posting allegations of Sambo being connected to gambling on his TikTok account. Masril was charged with violations of Electronic Information and Transactions Law. The police decided to do restorative justice and released Masril after holding him for 23 days.

On 31 August, a majority of Indonesians polled believed the Indonesian National Police would fully solve the case.

On 3 September, a woman in East Nusa Tenggara was taken to the police station and interrogated for likening traffic police in her area as Sambo on her social media. She was released later.

=== Officials ===
Indonesia's president Joko Widodo was keen for the force to be open about what happens: "Open it as it is. No cover-up. Transparent. That's it. This is important so that the people don't have doubts over the incident that occurred. This is what has to be maintained. Public trust in the police must be maintained." Jokowi reiterated multiple times that the case must be solved transparently.

== Trials ==
=== Murder trials ===
The murder trial of Sambo, his wife, two police officers and a driver – all facing charges of premeditated murder – started in South Jakarta District Court on 17 October 2022. Sambo was accused of ordering a subordinate to shoot Hutabarat, then shooting the wounded victim again himself to kill him. In parallel with the murder trial, seven former officers including Sambo were tried on charges of obstruction of justice related to alleged cover-ups and destruction of evidence.

In January 2023, the court rejected allegations that Hutabarat had raped, sexually assaulted or had an extramarital affair with Sambo's wife, Putri Candrawathi. Prosecutors said Candrawathi had invented the story that she had been raped by Hutabarat, and had repeatedly changed her version of events leading up to the shooting.

On 13 February 2023, Sambo was found "legally and convincingly guilty" of the premeditated murder of Hutabarat and sentenced to death. Verdicts and sentences regarding Candrawathi and the three other accused followed later in the week. Sambo's role as a law enforcer was seen by observers as a factor in the court imposing the maximum sentence – Ardi Manto Saputra, deputy director of human rights group Imparsial said Sambo had "tainted the reputation of law enforcement and the government's dignity".

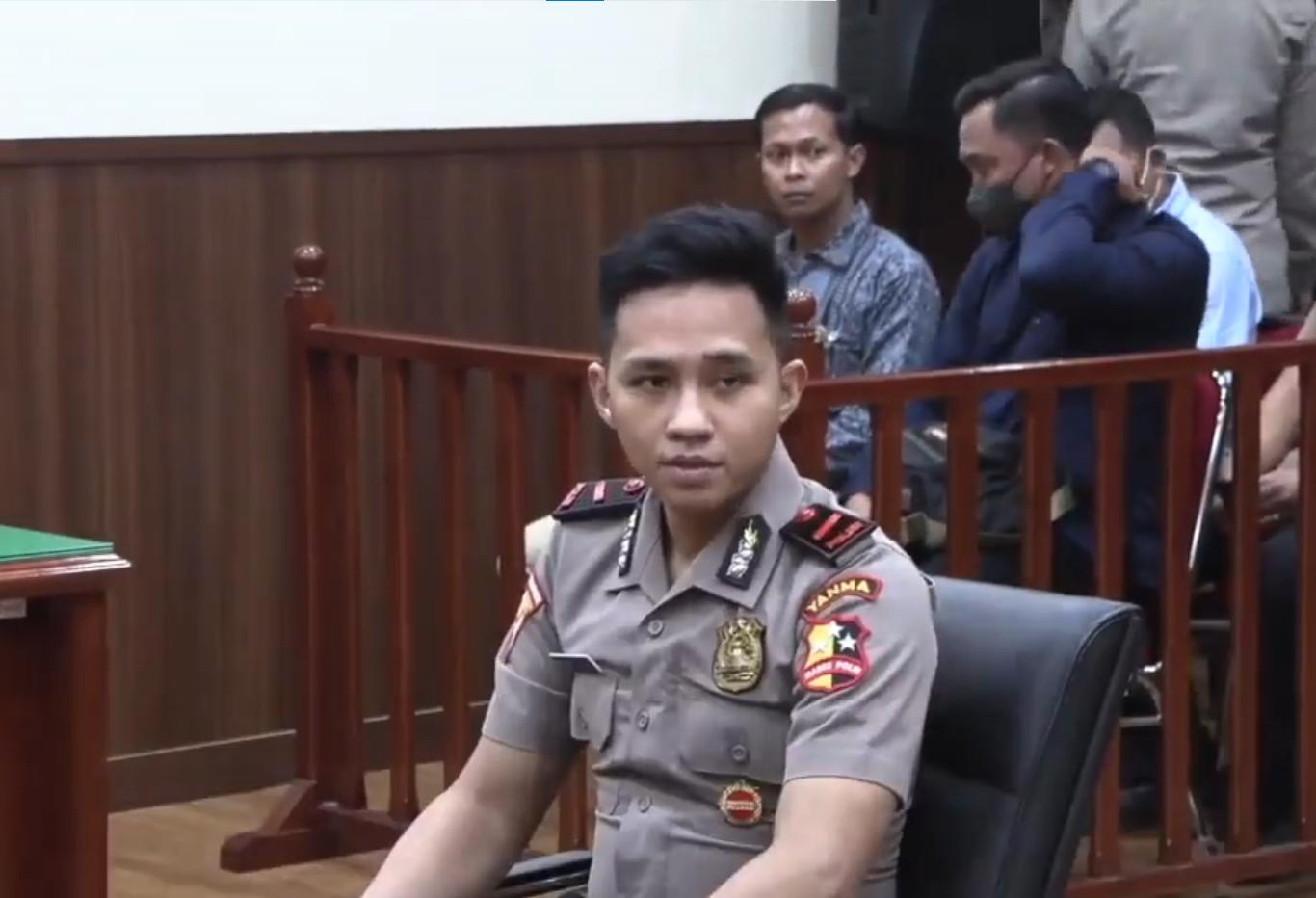
Richard Eliezer upon facing code of ethics trial on 22 February 2023

Candrawathi received a 20-years prison sentence for her role in the murder; her personal assistant Kuat Ma'ruf was given 15 years, and Ricky Rizal Wibowo was given a 13-year sentence (in all three cases, the prosecution had requested eight-year terms). On 15 February 2023, Richard Eliezer Pudihang Lumiu was sentenced to 18 months in prison for his role in the murder; the prosecution had requested a twelve-year term but he was given a lighter sentence for his efforts as a justice collaborator.

On 15 and 16 February 2023, lawyers for four defendants (Ma'ruf, Sambo, Candrawathi and Rizal) submitted appeals against their sentences; prosecutors lodged counter-appeals. On 12 April 2023, the South Jakarta District Court rejected all of the defendants' appeals, though the defendants could still appeal to the Supreme Court or seek clemency from the president. In May 2023, Sambo, Chandrawati and Ma'ruf filed cassation appeals to the Supreme Court, and on 8 August 2023 Sambo's sentence was reduced to one of life imprisonment. The Supreme Court halved Candrawathi's prison sentence to 10 years, Ma’ruf's sentence was cut from 15 to 10 years, while Rizal's sentence was reduced from 13 to eight years.

=== Obstruction of justice trials ===
On 27 February 2023, South Jakarta District Court sentenced two former police officers, Hendra Kurniawan and Agus Nurpatria, to three and two years in prison respectively, for their role in the attempted cover-up of Hutabarat's murder. For similar offences, Baiquni Wibowo and Chuck Potranto each received one-year prison sentences; Irfan Widyanto and Arif Rahman Arifin were each sentenced to 10 months in prison.

== Media ==
General Mayhem: The Killing of Brigadier J (Indonesian: Skenario Sang Jenderal) is a documentary film based upon the murder of Nofriansyah Yosua Hutabarat. It was released on 18 September 2026 on Netflix.

== See also ==
- Blue wall of silence – Informal rule that American police do not report misconduct by other officers
- Police corruption – Abuse of power by civil law enforcement
