= Ferdy Sambo =

Former Indonesian police general (born 1973)

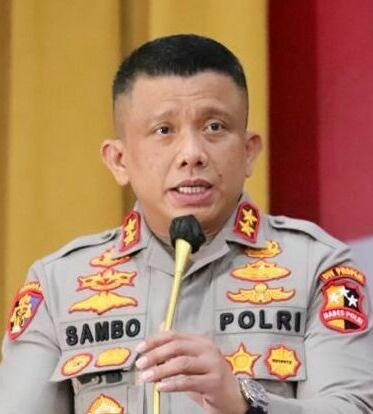
- Sambo in January 2022

Head of the Profession and Security Division of the Indonesian National Police
- In office 16 November 2020 – 4 August 2022
- President: Joko Widodo
- Preceded by: Ignatius Sigit Widiatmono
- Succeeded by: Syahar Diantono

Personal details
- Born: 9 February 1973 (age 53) Barru, South Sulawesi, Indonesia
- Spouse: Putri Candrawati (m. 2000)
- Children: 4
- Education: Police Academy (1994)
- Occupation: Police officer
- Nickname(s): FS, Sambo
- Police career
- Department: Investigation (Reserse)
- Branch: Indonesian National Police
- Service years: 1994–2022
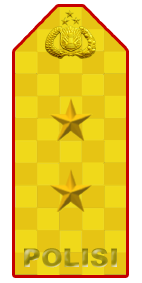
- Rank: Inspector General
- Criminal information
- Status: Convicted
- Convictions: 1 count for premeditated murder under Section 340 and 338 juncto 55 of the Indonesian Criminal Code (KUHP); 1 count for electronic system damage under section 49 and 33 Electronic Information and Transaction (ITE) (amended) Act 2016 juncto Section 55 of KUHP
- Penalty: Life sentence

Ferdy Sambo (born 9 February 1973) is a former Indonesian National Police commissioned officer who last served as the Head of the Profession and Security Division with the rank of Police General Inspector. He is known for his involvement in the murder of his aide-de-camp, Nofriansyah Yosua Hutabarat. He was described as the "mastermind" of the killing, in which Hutabarat was shot 12 times with a Glock 17.

On 13 February 2023, following a three-month trial at the South Jakarta District Court, Sambo was found guilty and sentenced to death. On 15 February 2023, Sambo filed an appeal against his sentence, two days after his conviction. However, on 12 April 2023, the South Jakarta District Court rejected the appeal, upholding the original sentence. As a result, Sambo's execution was set to proceed as planned. However, in May 2023, Sambo filed a cassation appeal to the Supreme Court of Indonesia, and on 8 August 2023 his sentence was commuted to one of life imprisonment.

== Early life ==
Ferdy Sambo was born on 9 February 1973, in Barru, South Sulawesi to William Sambo. His brother is Leonardo Sambo (born 2 June 1971). He went to SMPN 6 Makassar, where he met his future wife, Putri Candrawati. After completing high school, Sambo attended the police academy where he graduated in 1994.

== Personal life ==
Sambo is married to Putri Candrawati (born 1973), who previously had a career as a dentist; they married on 7 July 2000. The couple had four children named Trisha Eungelica Ardyadana (born 2001), Yakobus Jacki Uly (born 2005), Adrianus Sooai (born 2007), and Arka. During his trial, it was revealed that his youngest child was adopted.

His wealth has sparked controversy, with debate about how he could afford multiple luxury cars and numerous properties throughout the country, given the salary of police generals in Indonesia.

== Career ==
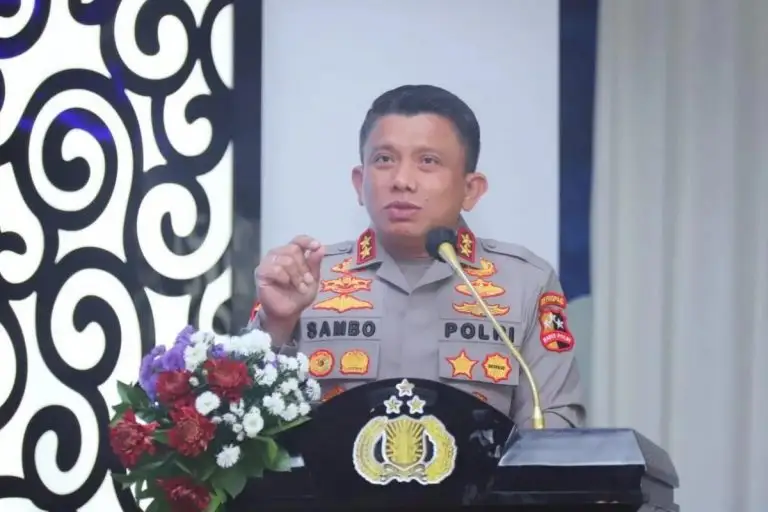
Sambo speaking during a training program for police officers involved in drug abuse, May 2022

His career in the police was fairly successful, especially in the field of detectives, after he was promoted from Head of Criminal Investigation Unit of West Jakarta Police to Chief of Police of Purbalingga in Central Java in 2012. Before serving as the Head of the Propam Police Division, Sambo was the Dirtipidum of the Criminal Investigation Unit of the police.

Police ranking
Preceded by: Inspector General. Pol. Ignatius Sigit Widiatmono	Head of the Profession and Security Division of the Indonesian National Police 2020—2022	Succeeded by: Inspector General. Pol. Syahar Diantono
Preceded by: Brigadier General. Pol. Nico Afinta	Director of General Crimes of the Criminal Investigation Agency of the Indonesian National Police 2019—2020	Succeeded by: Brigadier General. Pol. Andi Rian R. Djajadi
Preceded by: Chief Commissioner. Pol. Mardiaz Kusin	Coordinator of Personal Staff of the Chief of the Indonesian National Police 2018—2019	Succeeded by: Chief Commissioner. Pol. Suwondo Nainggolan
Preceded by: Chief Commissioner Adjudant Kif Aminanto	Head of Brebes Regional Police 2013—2015	Succeeded by: Chief Commissioner Adjudant Harryo Sugihhartono
Preceded by: Chief Commissioner Adjudant Roy Hardi Siahaan	Head of Purbalingga Regional Police 2012—2013	Succeeded by: Chief Commissioner Adjudant I Ketut Suwitra

== Murder of Brigadier Yosua ==
Brigadier Nofriansyah Yosua Hutabarat was shot at the Jakarta home of Ferdy Sambo on 8 July 2022 at approximately 17:00 Western Indonesian Time. Hutabarat, a bodyguard and driver for Sambo, was said to have died after a shootout with another member of the protection team, Second Patrolman Richard Eliezer Pudihang Lumiu, allegedly after Hutabarat sexually harassed Sambo's wife, Putri Candrawati. After the shooting, Hutabarat was transported by ambulance to a hospital where he was pronounced dead, though news of the shooting was delayed until 11 July 2022.

On 9 August 2022, Sambo was taken into custody and charged with premeditated murder, which carries the death penalty or life imprisonment. It was later alleged that patrolman Lumiu had been promised immunity from prosecution by Sambo if he followed through with Sambo's version of the shooting. Despite the assurance of Sambo, Lumiu continued to be the sole suspect for the murder, prompting Lumiu to provide the police with a more accurate and open testimony that contradicted Sambo's version of the event.

Head of Indonesian police, General Listyo Sigit Prabowo told a press conference that Sambo had fired multiple pistol shots into a wall in an attempt to show a gunfight had led to Hutabarat's death; there had been no shoot-out and that Sambo had orchestrated Hutabarat's murder. He was described as the "mastermind" of the killing, in which Hutabarat was shot 12 times with a Glock 17.

== Trial ==
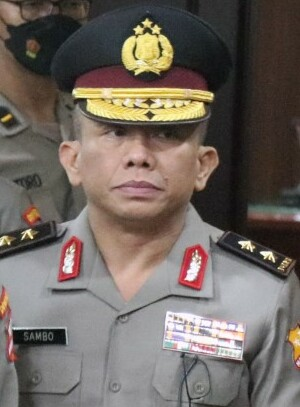
Sambo upon facing his code of ethics trial for his involvement in the murder of Nofriansyah Yosua Hutabarat, August 2022

The murder trial of Ferdy Sambo, his wife, two police officers and a driver – all facing charges of premeditated murder – started in South Jakarta District Court on 17 October 2022. Sambo was accused of ordering a subordinate to shoot Hutabarat, then shooting the wounded victim again himself to kill him. In parallel with the murder trial, seven former officers including Sambo were tried on charges of obstruction of justice related to alleged cover-ups and destruction of evidence.

In January 2023, the court rejected allegations that Hutabarat had raped, sexually assaulted or had an adulterous affair with Sambo's wife, Putri Candrawathi. Prosecutors said Candrawathi had invented a story that she had been raped by Hutabarat, and had repeatedly changed her version of events leading up to the shooting.

On 13 February 2023, Ferdy Sambo was found "legally and convincingly guilty" of the premeditated murder of Hutabarat and sentenced to death – a penalty usually carried out in Indonesia by firing squad. Verdicts and sentences regarding Candrawathi and the three other accused followed later in the week. Sambo has a week to appeal the verdict; his role as a law enforcer was seen by observers as a factor in the court imposing the maximum sentence – Ardi Manto Saputra, deputy director of human rights group Imparsial said Sambo had "tainted the reputation of law enforcement and the government's dignity".

Candrawathi received a 20-years prison sentence for her role in the murder; her personal assistant Kuat Ma'ruf was given 15 years, and Ricky Rizal Wibowo was given a 13-year sentence (in all three cases, the prosecution had requested eight-year terms). On 15 February 2023, Richard Eliezer Pudihang Lumiu was sentenced to 18 months in prison for his role in the murder; the prosecution had requested a twelve-year term but he was given a lighter sentence for his efforts as a justice collaborator.

On 15 and 16 February 2023, lawyers for four defendants (Ma'ruf, Sambo, Candrawathi and Rizal) submitted appeals against their sentences; prosecutors lodged counter-appeals. On 12 April 2023, the South Jakarta District Court rejected all of the defendants' appeals, though the defendants can still appeal to the Supreme Court or seek clemency from the president. In May 2023, Sambo, Chandrawati and Ma'ruf filed cassation appeals to the Supreme Court.

On 8 August 2023, Sambo's appeal was granted by the Supreme Court on a majority decision (3-2), thereby reducing his sentence to one of life imprisonment. The Supreme Court also halved Candrawathi's prison sentence to 10 years, Ma’ruf's sentence was cut from 15 to 10 years, while Rizal's sentence was reduced from 13 to eight years.
