= Asian painting =

The history of Asian painting includes painting in the history of Asian art.

The history of Eastern painting includes a vast range of influences from various cultures and religions. Developments in Eastern painting historically parallel those in Western painting, in general a few centuries earlier. Indonesian art, Indian art, Chinese art, Korean Art, and Japanese art each had significant influence on Western art, and, vice versa.

Chinese painting is one of the oldest continuous artistic traditions in the world. The earliest paintings were not representational but ornamental; they consisted of patterns or designs rather than pictures. Early pottery was painted with spirals, zigzags, dots, or animals. It was only during the Warring States period (403–221 B.C.) that artists began to represent the world around them. Japanese painting is one of the oldest and most highly refined of the Japanese arts, encompassing a wide variety of genre and styles. The history of Japanese painting is a long history of synthesis and competition between native Japanese aesthetics and adaptation of imported ideas. Korean painting, as an independent form, began around 108 B.C., around the fall of Gojoseon, making it one of the oldest in the world. The artwork of that time period evolved into the various styles that characterized the Three Kingdoms of Korea period, most notably the paintings and frescoes that adorn the tombs of Goguryeo's royalty. During the Three Kingdoms period and through the Goryeo dynasty, Korean painting was characterized primarily by a combination of Korean-style landscapes, facial features, Buddhist-centered themes, and an emphasis on celestial observation that was facilitated by the rapid development of Korean astronomy.

== East Asian ==
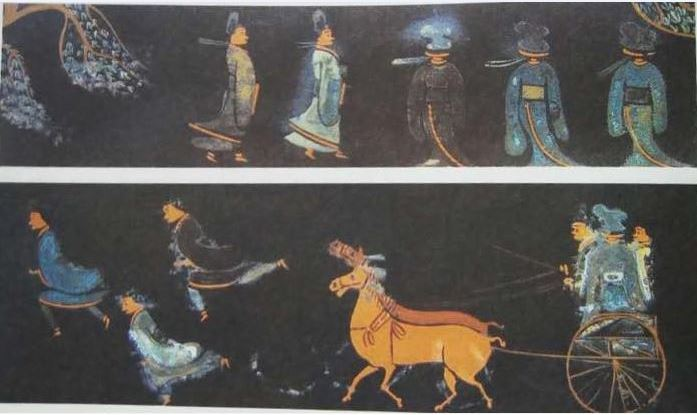
A lacquerware painting from the State of Chu (704–223 BC)

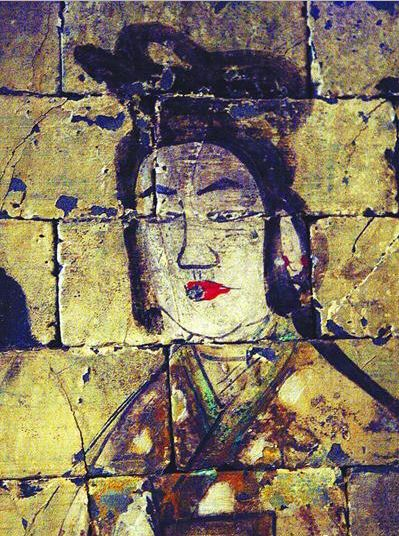
Fresco of a Chinese woman, Western Han (202 BC – 9 AD)

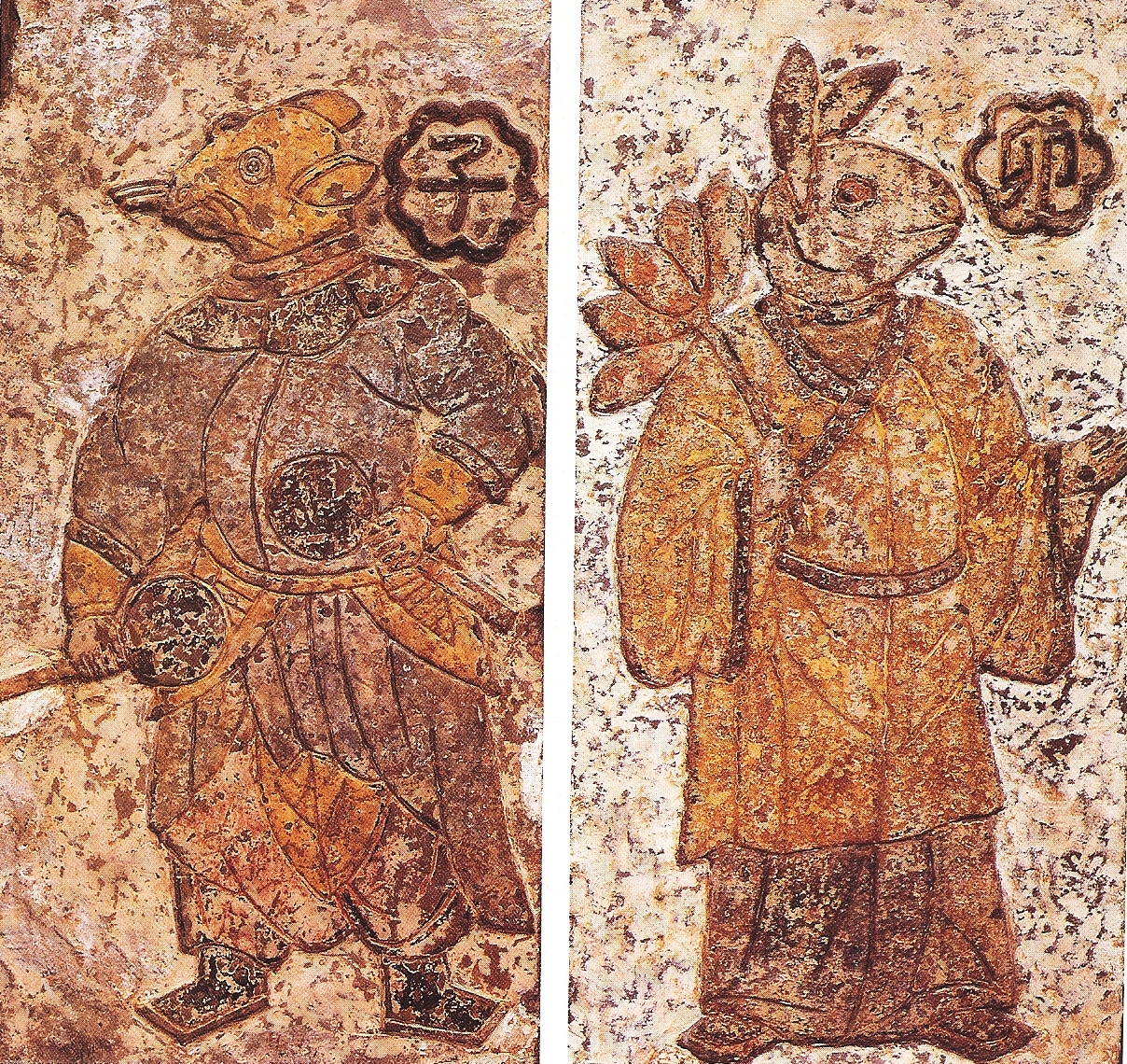
Paintings of guardian spirits, Han dynasty (202 BC – 220 AD)

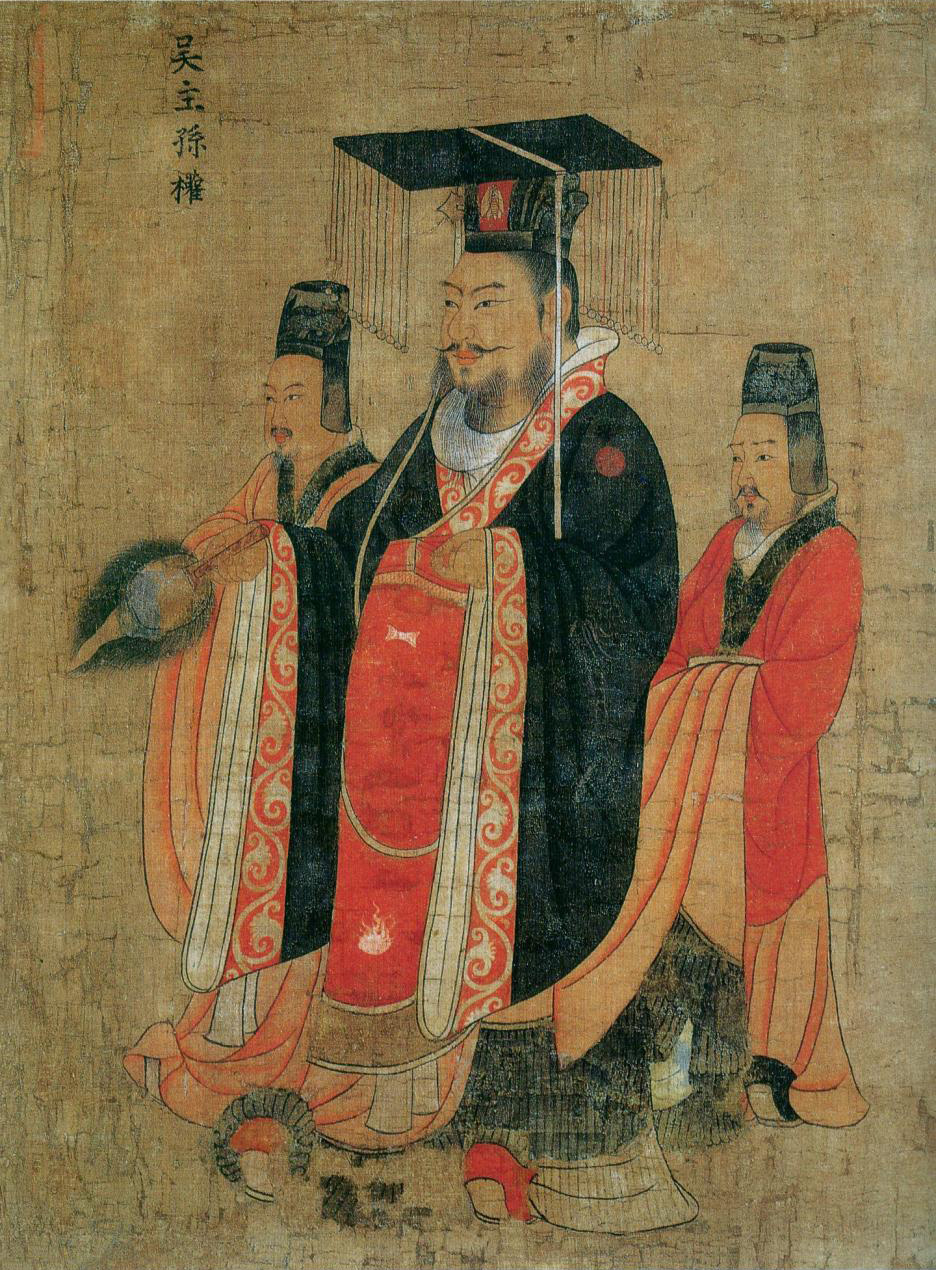
Emperor Sun Quan by Yan Liben (600–673 AD), Tang dynasty

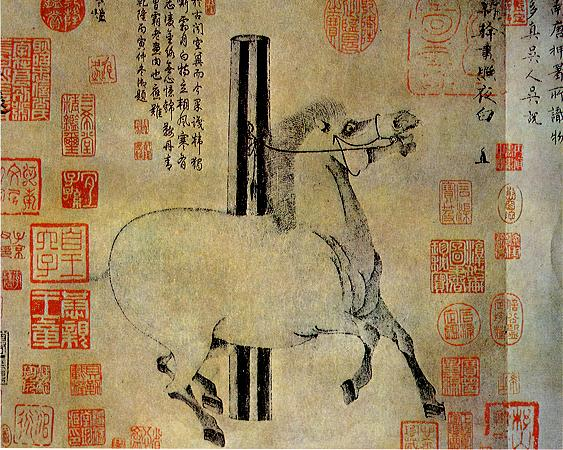
Night-Shining White, by Han Gan (8th century), Tang dynasty

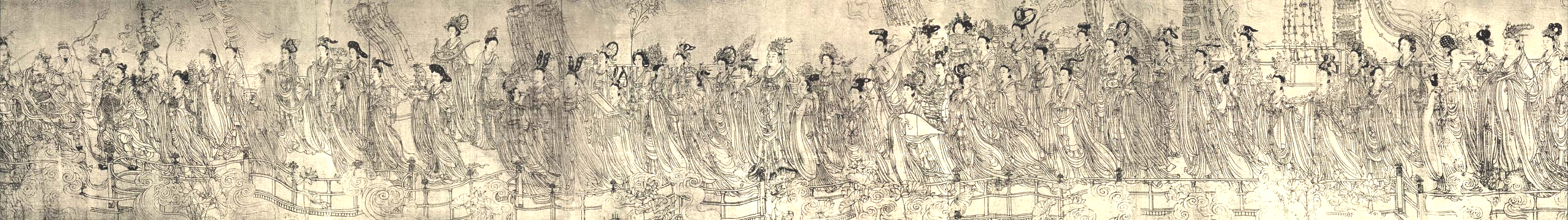
Eighty-Seven Celestials, by Wu Daozi (685–758), Tang dynasty

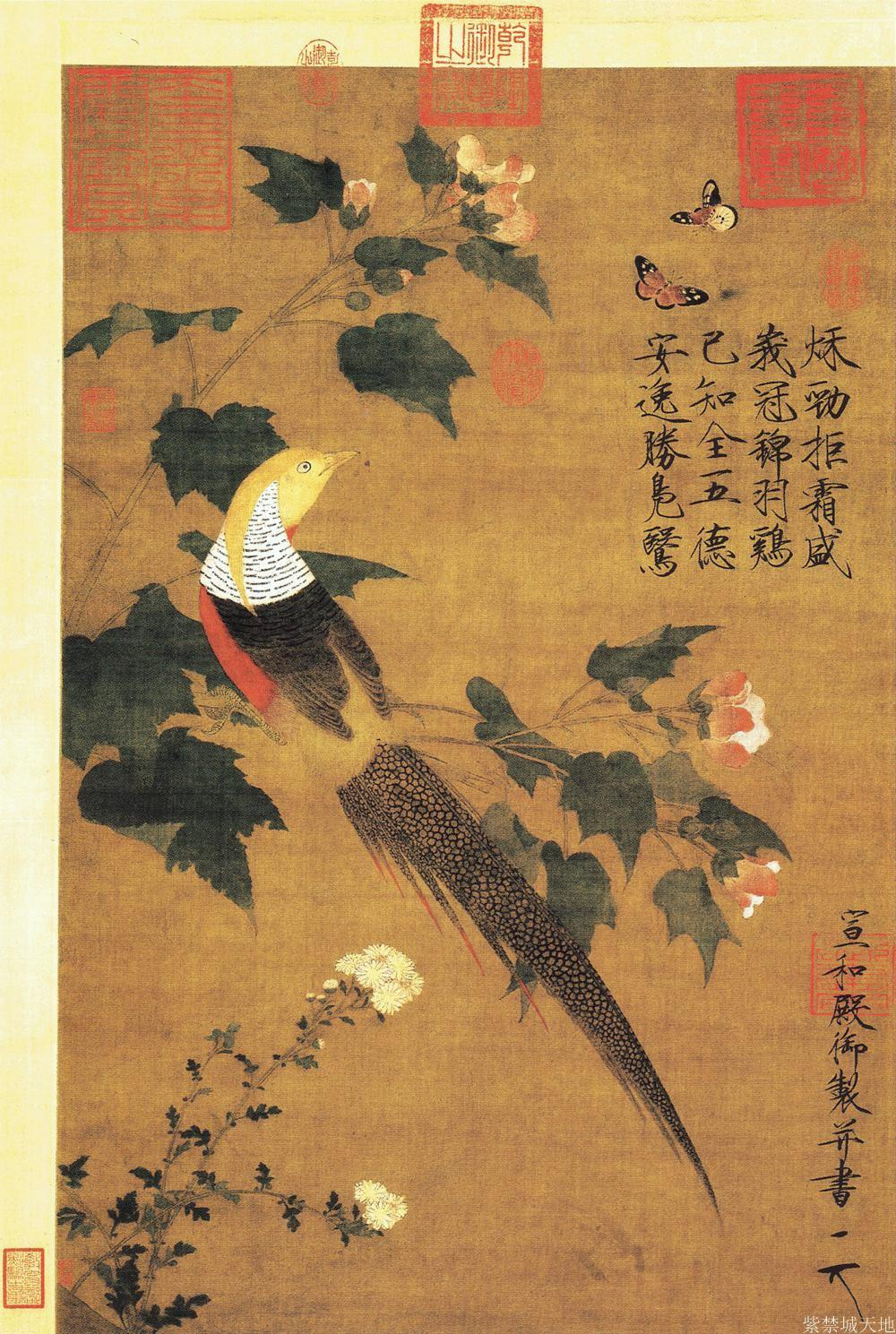
Golden Pheasant and Cotton Rose, by Emperor Huizong of Song (1100–1126 AD), Song dynasty

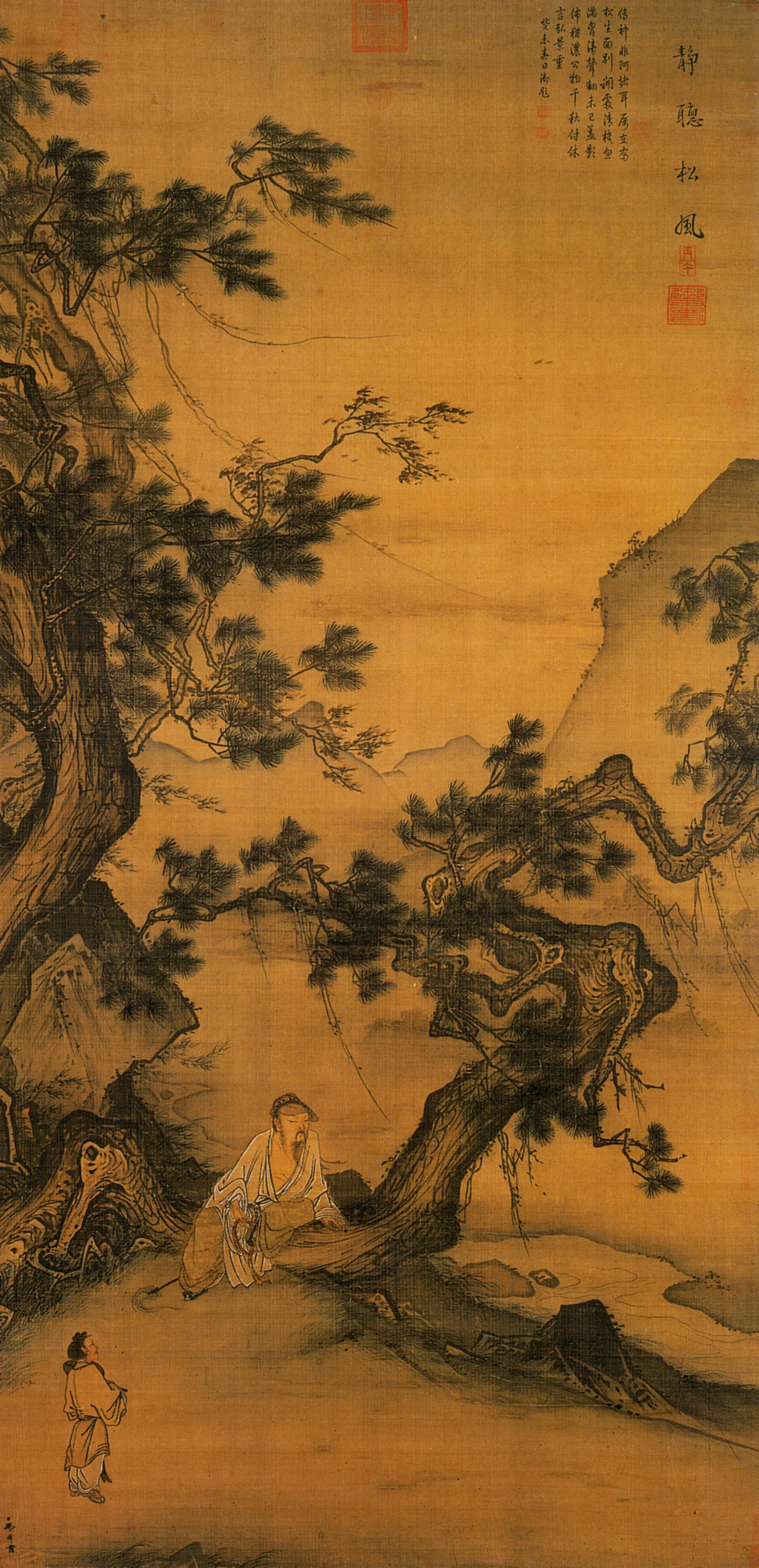
A Man and His Horse in the Wind, by Zhao Mengfu (1254–1322 AD), Chinese

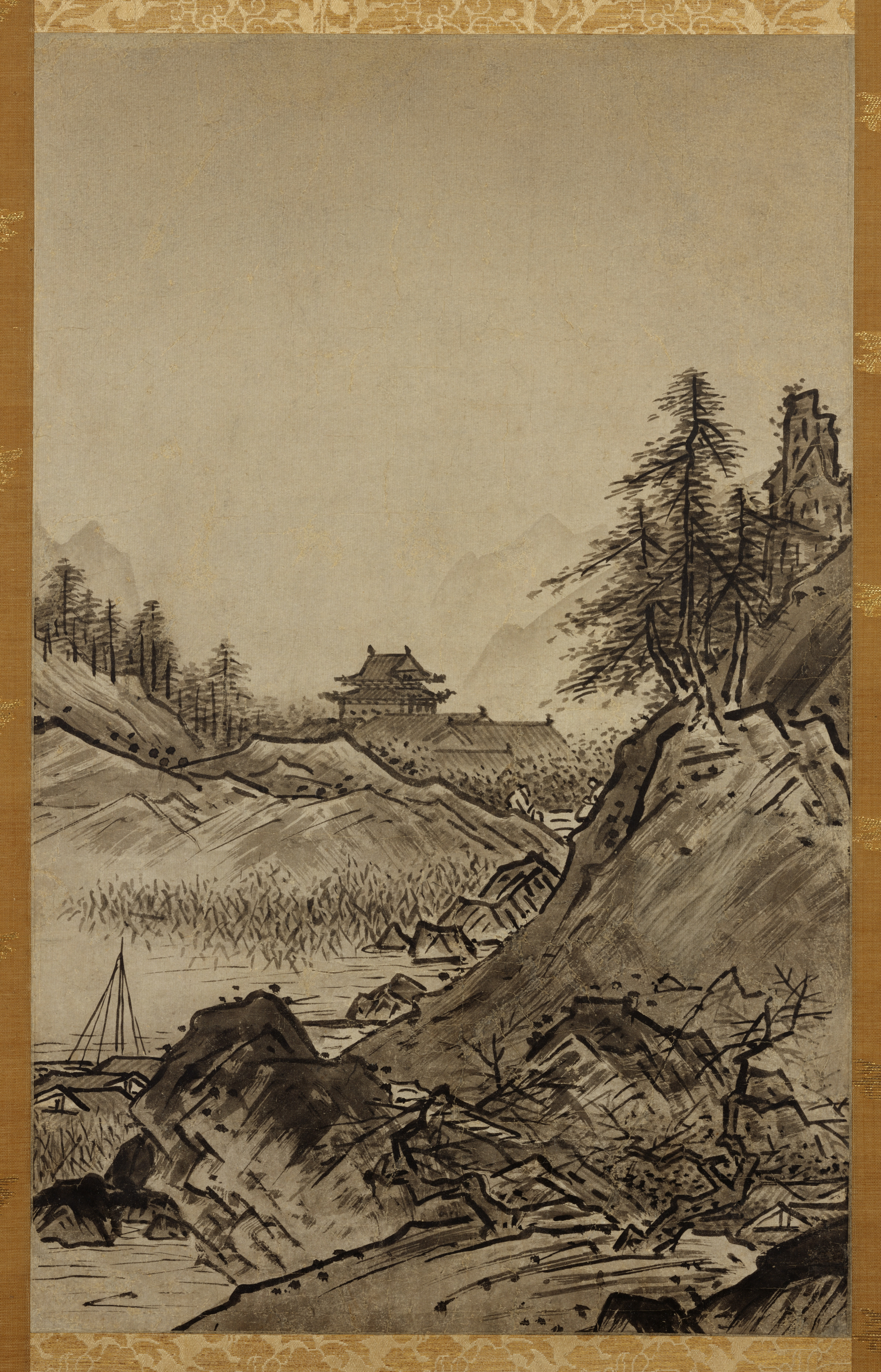
Shukei-sansui (Autumn Landscape), Sesshu Toyo (1420–1506), Japanese

Pine Trees screen by Hasegawa Tōhaku (1539–1610), Japanese

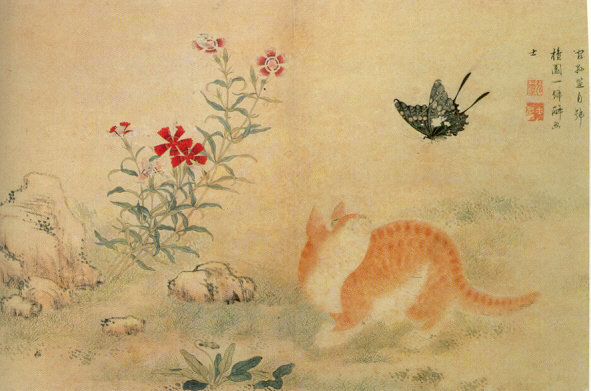
A Cat and a Butterfly, by Kim Hong-do (1745–?), 18th century, Korean

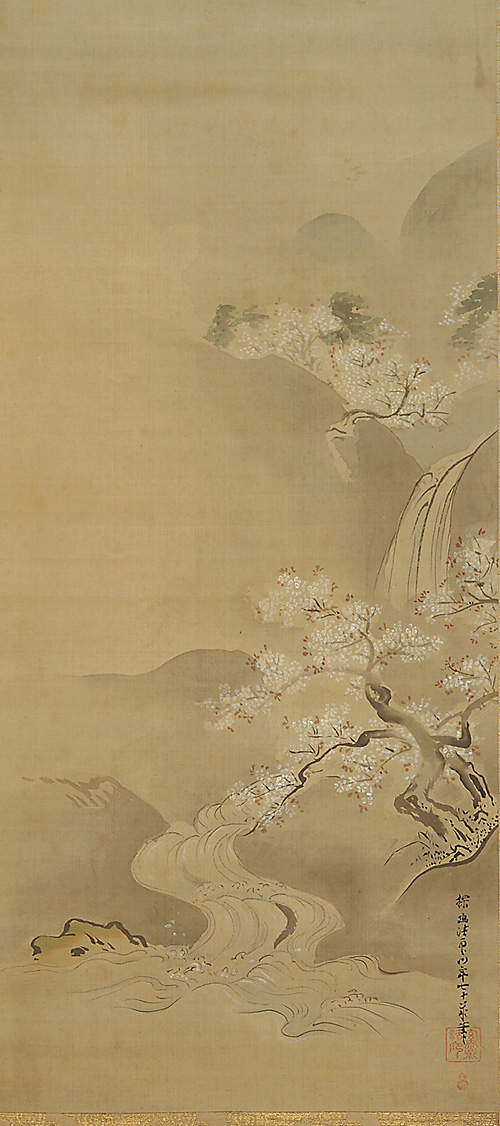
Hanging scroll by Kanō Tanyū (1602–1674), Japanese

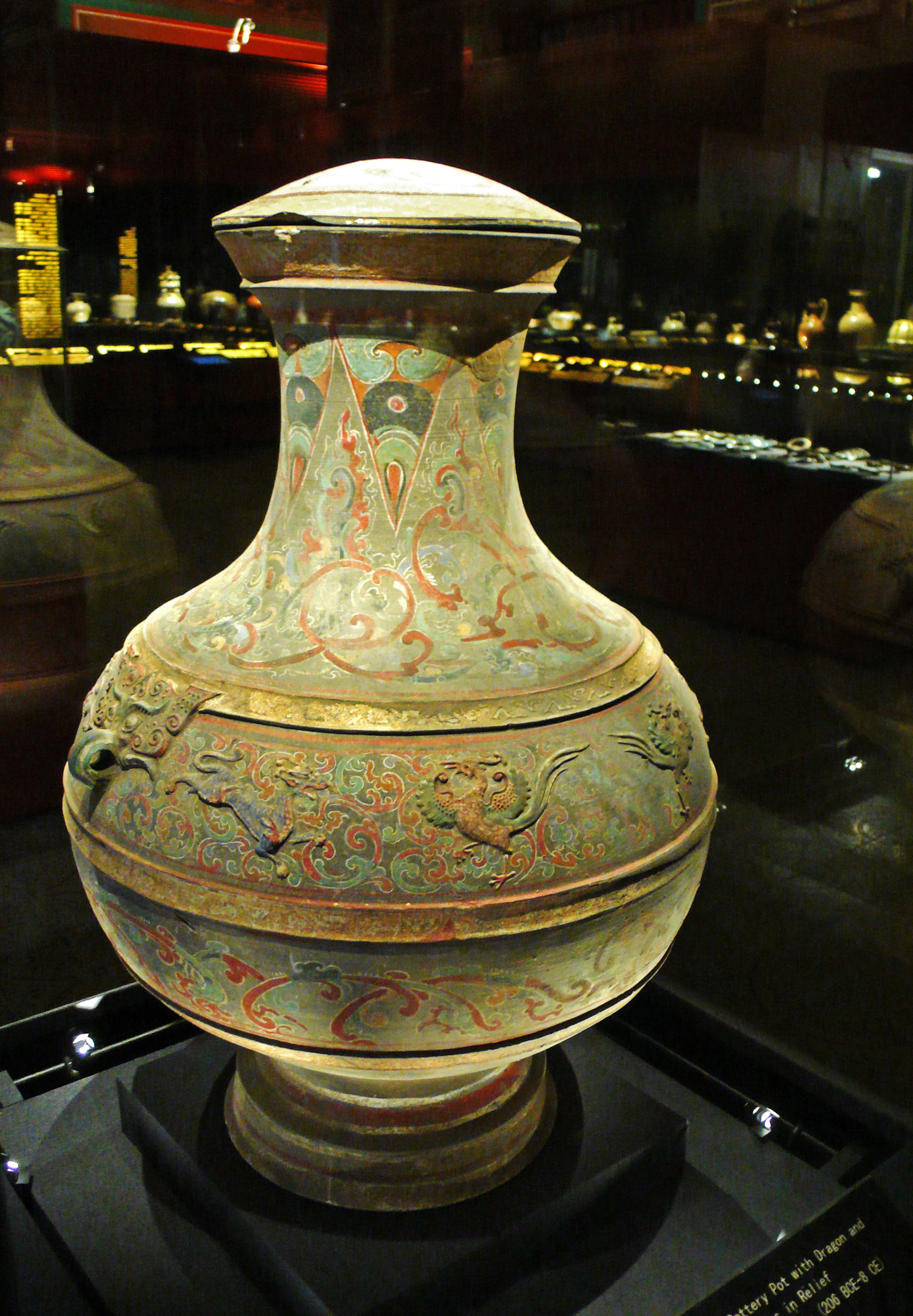
A Chinese painted jar from the Western Han Era (202 BCE – 9 CE)

China, Japan and Korea have a strong tradition in painting which is also highly attached to the art of calligraphy and printmaking (so much that it is commonly seen as painting). Far east traditional painting is characterized by water based techniques, less realism, "elegant" and stylized subjects, graphical approach to depiction, the importance of white space (or negative space) and a preference for landscape (instead of the human figure) as a subject. Beyond ink and color on silk or paper scrolls, gold on lacquer was also a common medium in painted East Asian artwork. Although silk was a somewhat expensive medium to paint upon in the past, the invention of paper during the 1st century AD by the Han court eunuch Cai Lun provided not only a cheap and widespread medium for writing, but also a cheap and widespread medium for painting (making it more accessible to the public).

The ideologies of Confucianism, Daoism, and Buddhism played important roles in East Asian art. Medieval Song dynasty painters such as Lin Tinggui and his Luohan Laundering (housed in the Smithsonian Freer Gallery of Art) of the 12th century are excellent examples of Buddhist ideas fused into classical Chinese artwork. In the latter painting on silk (image and description provided in the link), bald-headed Buddhist Luohan are depicted in a practical setting of washing clothes by a river. However, the painting itself is visually stunning, with the Luohan portrayed in rich detail and bright, opaque colors in contrast to a hazy, brown, and bland wooded environment. Also, the tree tops are shrouded in swirling fog, providing the common "negative space" mentioned above in East Asian Art.

In Japonisme, late 19th-century Post-Impressionists like Van Gogh and Henri de Toulouse-Lautrec, and tonalists such as James McNeill Whistler, admired early 19th-century Japanese Ukiyo-e artists like Hokusai (1760–1849) and Hiroshige (1797–1858) and were influenced by them.

Panorama of Along the River During Qing Ming Festival, 18th-century remake of 12th-century Song dynasty original by Chinese artist Zhang Zeduan. The original painting by Zhang is revered by scholars as "one of Chinese civilization's greatest masterpieces." Note: scroll starts from the right.

=== Chinese ===
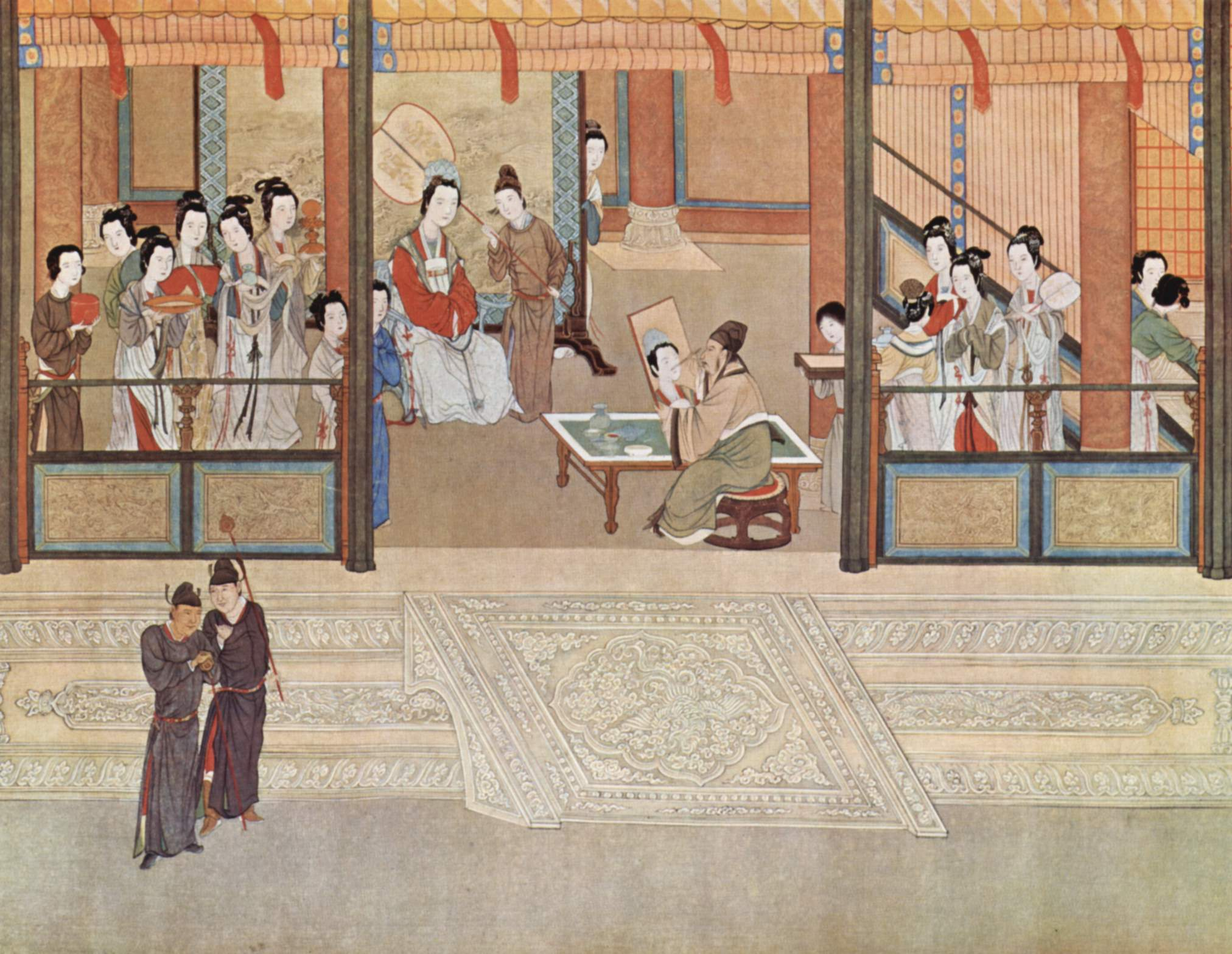
Spring Morning in the Han Palace, by Ming-era artist Qiu Ying (1494–1552 AD)

The earliest surviving examples of Chinese painted artwork date to the Warring States period (481–221 BC), with paintings on silk or tomb murals on rock, brick, or stone. They were often in simplistic stylized format and in more-or-less rudimentary geometric patterns. They often depicted mythological creatures, domestic scenes, labor scenes, or palatial scenes filled with officials at court. Artwork during this period and the subsequent Qin dynasty (221–207 BC) and Han dynasty (202 BC – 220 AD) was made not as a means in and of itself or for higher personal expression; rather artwork was created to symbolize and honor funerary rites, representations of mythological deities or spirits of ancestors, etc. Paintings on silk of court officials and domestic scenes could be found during the Han dynasty, along with scenes of men hunting on horseback or partaking in military parade. There was also painting on three dimensional works of art like figurines and statues, such as the original-painted colors covering the soldier and horse statues of the Terracotta Army. During the social and cultural climate of the ancient Eastern Jin dynasty (316 – 420 AD) based at Nanjing in the south, painting became one of the official pastimes of Confucian-taught bureaucratic officials and aristocrats (along with music played by the guqin zither, writing fanciful calligraphy, and writing and reciting of poetry). Painting became a common form of artistic self-expression, and during this period painters at court or amongst elite social circuits were judged and ranked by their peers.

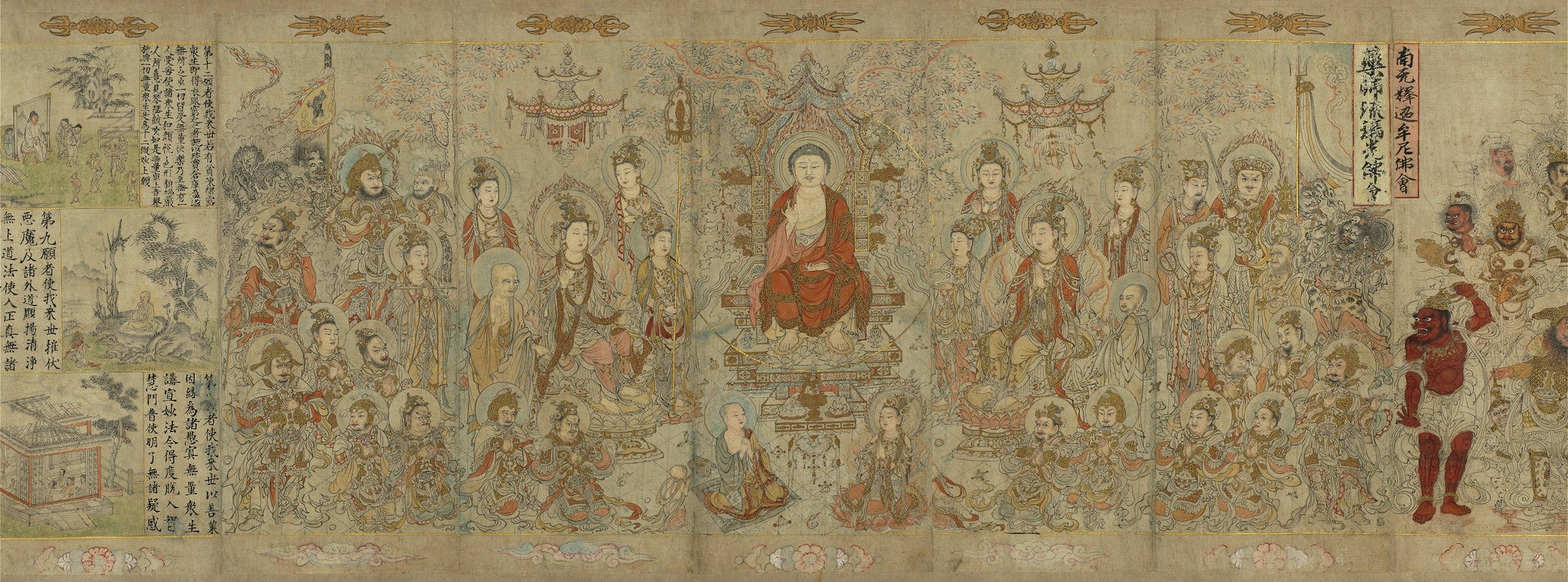
The Sakyamuni Buddha, by Zhang Shengwen, 1173–1176 AD, Song dynasty period.

The establishment of classical Chinese landscape painting is accredited largely to the Eastern Jin dynasty artist Gu Kaizhi (344 – 406 AD), one of the most famous artists of Chinese history. Like the elongated scroll scenes of Kaizhi, Tang dynasty (618–907 AD) Chinese artists like Wu Daozi painted vivid and highly detailed artwork on long horizontal handscrolls (which were very popular during the Tang), such as his Eighty Seven Celestial People. Painted artwork during the Tang period pertained the effects of an idealized landscape environment, with sparse numbers of objects, persons, or amount of activity, as well as monochromatic in nature (example: the murals of Prince Yide's tomb in the Qianling Mausoleum). There were also figures such as early Tang-era painter Zhan Ziqian, who painted superb landscape paintings that were well ahead of his day in portrayal of realism. However, landscape art did not reach greater level of maturity and realism in general until the Five Dynasties and Ten Kingdoms period (907–960 AD). During this time, there were exceptional landscape painters like Dong Yuan (refer to this article for an example of his artwork), and those who painted more vivid and realistic depictions of domestic scenes, like Gu Hongzhong and his Night Revels of Han Xizai.

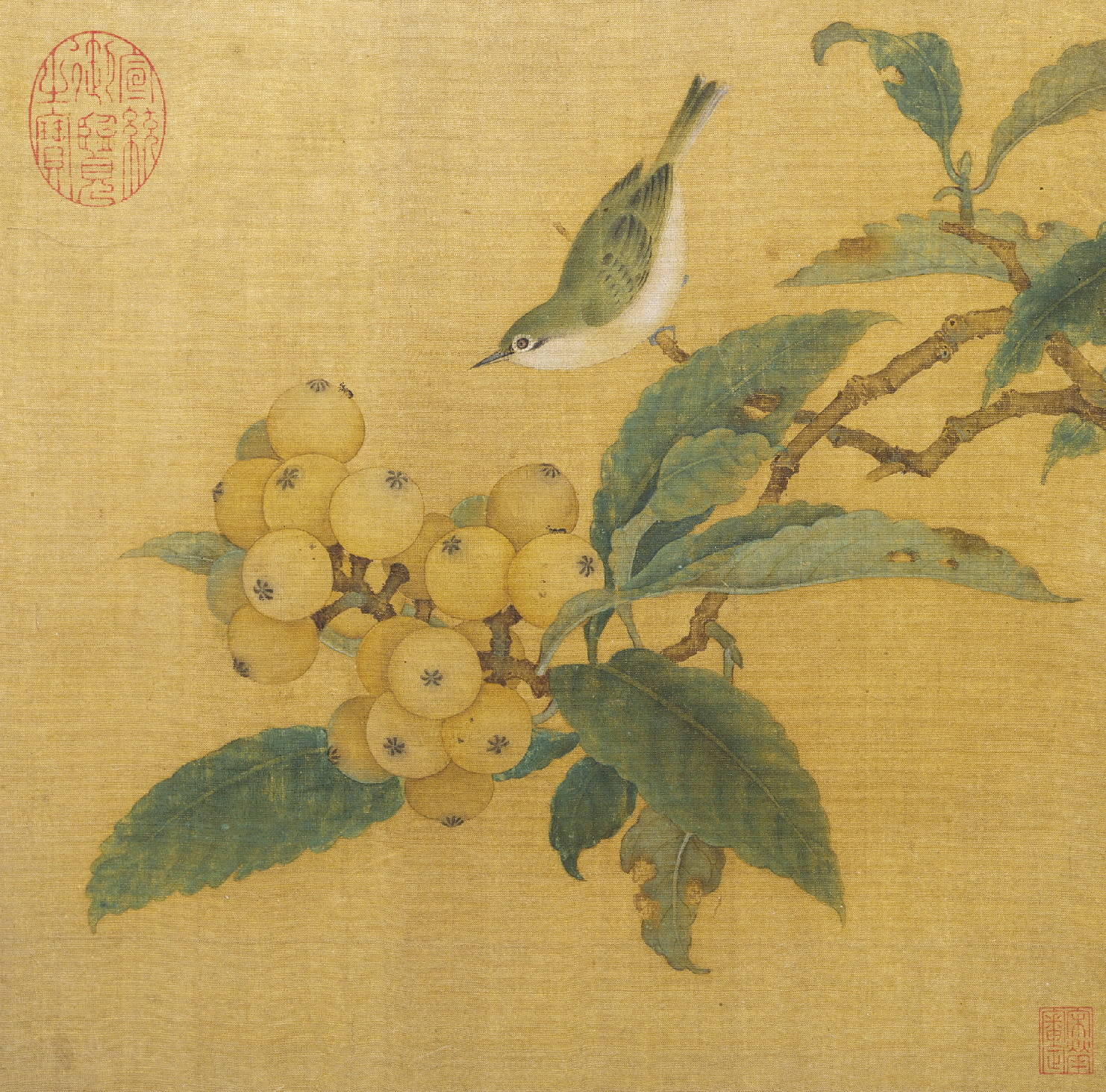
Loquats and Mountain Bird, anonymous artist of the Southern Song dynasty; paintings in leaf album style such as this were popular in the Southern Song (1127–1279).

During the Chinese Song dynasty (960–1279 AD), not only landscape art was improved upon, but portrait painting became more standardized and sophisticated than before (for example, refer to Emperor Huizong of Song), and reached its classical age maturity during the Ming dynasty (1368–1644 AD). During the late 13th century and first half of the 14th century, Chinese under the Mongol-controlled Yuan dynasty were not allowed to enter higher posts of government (reserved for Mongols or other ethnic groups from Central Asia), and the Imperial examination was ceased for the time being. Many Confucian-educated Chinese who now lacked profession turned to the arts of painting and theatre instead, as the Yuan period became one of the most vibrant and abundant eras for Chinese artwork. An example of such would be Qian Xuan (1235–1305 AD), who was an official of the Song dynasty, but out of patriotism, refused to serve the Yuan court and dedicated himself to painting. Examples of superb art from this period include the rich and detailed painted murals of the Yongle Palace, or "Dachunyang Longevity Palace", of 1262 AD, a UNESCO World Heritage site. Within the palace, paintings cover an area of more than 1000 square meters, and hold mostly Daoist themes. It was during the Song dynasty that painters would also gather in social clubs or meetings to discuss their art or others' artwork, the praising of which often led to persuasions to trade and sell precious works of art. However, there were also many harsh critics of others art as well, showing the difference in style and taste amongst different painters. In 1088 AD, the polymath scientist and statesman Shen Kuo once wrote of the artwork of one Li Cheng, who he criticized as follows:

...Then there was Li Cheng, who when he depicted pavilions and lodges amidst mountains, storeyed buildings, pagodas and the like, always used to paint the eaves as seen from below. His idea was that 'one should look upwards from underneath, just as a man standing on level ground and looking up at the eaves of a pagoda can see its rafters and its cantilever eave rafters'. This is all wrong. In general the proper way of painting a landscape is to see the small from the viewpoint of the large...just as one looks at artificial mountains in gardens (as one walks about). If one applies (Li's method) to the painting of real mountains, looking up at them from below, one can only see one profile at a time, and not the wealth of their multitudinous slopes and profiles, to say nothing of all that is going on in the valleys and canyons, and in the lanes and courtyards with their dwellings and houses. If we stand to the east of a mountain its western parts would be on the vanishing boundary of far-off distance, and vice versa. Surely this could not be called a successful painting? Mr. Li did not understand the principle of 'seeing the small from the viewpoint of the large'. He was certainly marvelous at diminishing accurately heights and distances, but should one attach such importance to the angles and corners of buildings?

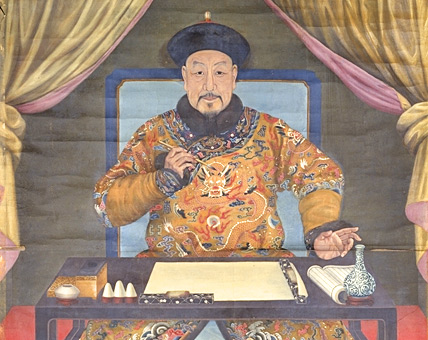
Qianlong Emperor Practicing Calligraphy, mid-18th century.

Although high level of stylization, mystical appeal, and surreal elegance were often preferred over realism (such as in shan shui style), beginning with the medieval Song dynasty there were many Chinese painters then and afterwards who depicted scenes of nature that were vividly real. Later Ming dynasty artists would take after this Song dynasty emphasis for intricate detail and realism on objects in nature, especially in depictions of animals (such as ducks, swans, sparrows, tigers, etc.) amongst patches of brightly colored flowers and thickets of brush and wood (a good example would be the anonymous Ming dynasty painting Birds and Plum Blossoms, housed in the Freer Gallery of the Smithsonian Museum in Washington, D.C.). There were many renowned Ming dynasty artists; Qiu Ying is an excellent example of a paramount Ming era painter (famous even in his own day), utilizing in his artwork domestic scenes, bustling palatial scenes, and nature scenes of river valleys and steeped mountains shrouded in mist and swirling clouds. During the Ming dynasty there were also different and rivaling schools of art associated with painting, such as the Wu School and the Zhe School.

Classical Chinese painting continued on into the early modern Qing dynasty, with highly realistic portrait paintings like seen in the late Ming dynasty of the early 17th century. The portraits of Kangxi Emperor, Yongzheng Emperor, and Qianlong Emperor are excellent examples of realistic Chinese portrait painting. During the Qianlong reign period and the continuing 19th century, European Baroque styles of painting had noticeable influence on Chinese portrait paintings, especially with painted visual effects of lighting and shading. Likewise, East Asian paintings and other works of art (such as porcelain and lacquerware) were highly prized in Europe since initial contact in the 16th century.

==== Chinese oil paintings ====
Western techniques of oil paintings began entering China in the 19th century, becoming prevalent among Chinese artists and art students in the early 20th century, coinciding with China's growing engagement with the West. Artists such as Li Tiefu, Hong Yi, Xu Beihong, Yan Wenliang, Lin Fengmian, Fang Ganmin, Pang Yuliang went abroad, predominantly to Paris and Tokyo, to learn Western art. Through them, artistic movements such as Impressionism, Cubism, Fauvism, Post-impressionism grew and thrived in China, only halted by the Second World War and the birth of the People's Republic of China, when modernistic artistic styles were seen as being inconsistent with the prevailing political ideals and realism was the only acceptable artistic form. Nonetheless, the legacy of the close engagement with Western art in the early 20th century endured. Oil paintings survived as an important medium in Chinese artistic scenes; traditional Chinese ink paintings were also changed as a result.

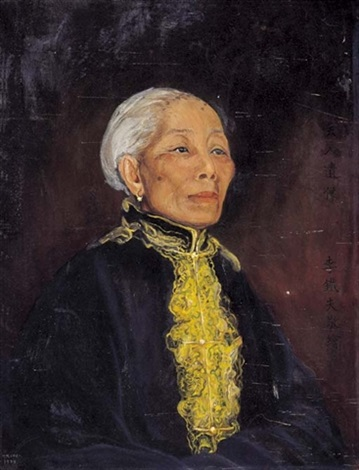
Portrait of Madame Liu, (1942) Li Tiefu oil on canvas

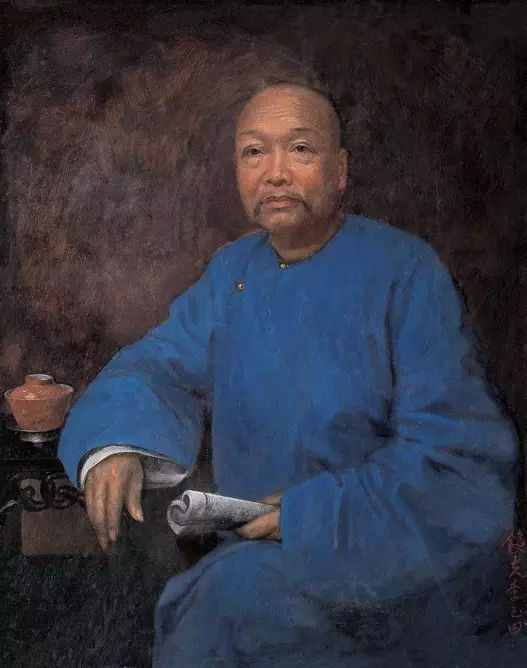
Portrait of Kang Youwei (1904) Li Tiefu oil on canvas

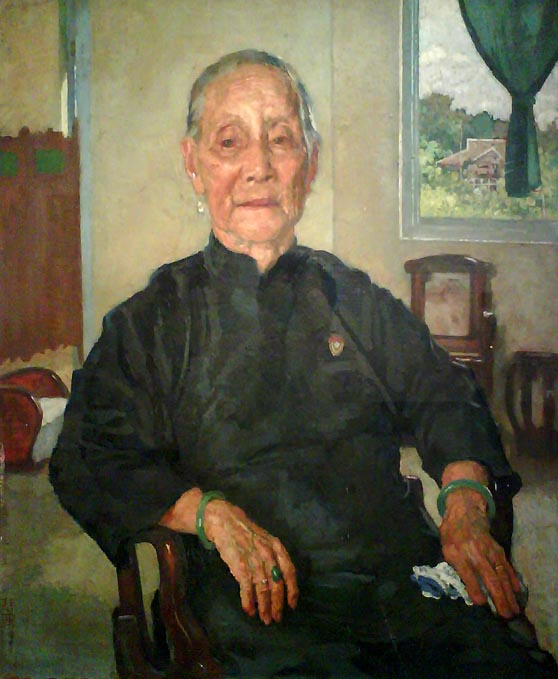
Portrait of Madam Cheng (1941) Oil on board Xu Beihong

=== Japanese ===
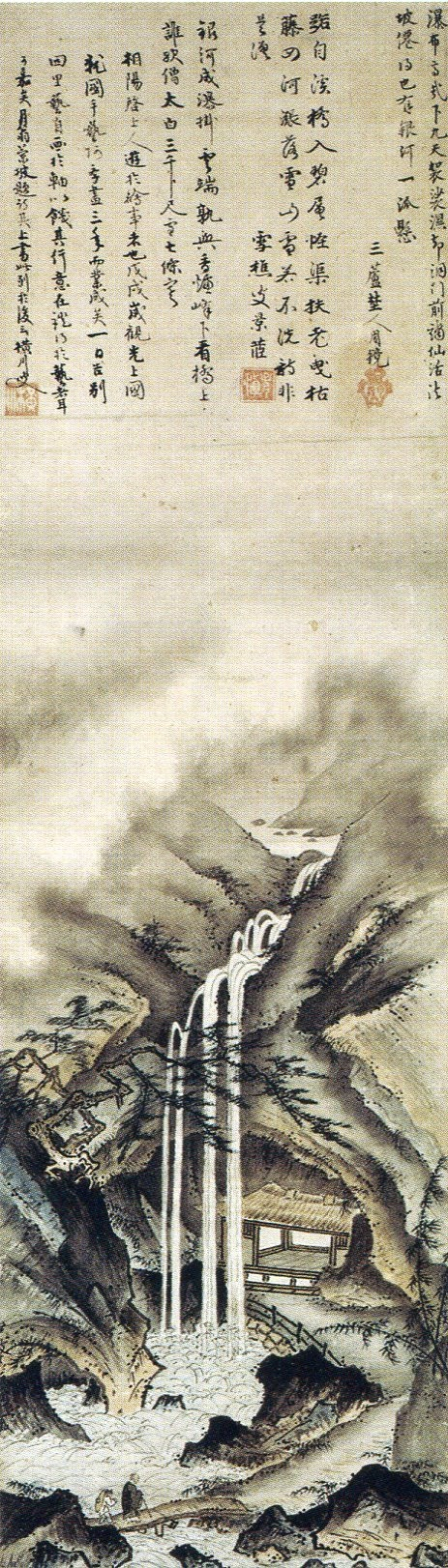
Muromachi period, Shingei (1431–1485), Viewing a Waterfall, Nezu Museum, Tokyo.

Japanese painting (絵画) is one of the oldest and most highly refined of the Japanese arts, encompassing a wide variety of genres and styles. As with Japanese arts in general, Japanese painting developed through a long history of synthesis and competition between native Japanese aesthetics and adaptation of imported ideas. Ukiyo-e, or "pictures of the floating world," is a genre of Japanese woodblock prints (or "woodcuts") and paintings produced between the 17th and 20th centuries, featuring motifs of landscapes, theater, and courtesan districts. It is the main artistic genre of Japanese woodblock printing. Japanese printmaking, especially from the Edo period, exerted enormous influence on French painting over the 19th century. While in the 19th century, Japanese painters developed a new painting technique called yōga that borrowed heavily from western painting techniques and materials, such notable artists include Harada Naojirō, Fujishima Takeji, and Kuroda Seiki.

=== Korean ===
Korean painting, as an independent form, began around 108 B.C., around the fall of Gojoseon, making it one of the oldest in the world. The artwork of that time period evolved into the various styles that characterized the Three Kingdoms of Korea period, most notably the paintings and frescoes that adorn the tombs of Goguryeo's royalty. During the Three Kingdoms period and through the Goryeo dynasty, Korean painting was characterized primarily by a combination of Korean-style landscapes, facial features, Buddhist-centered themes, and an emphasis on celestial observation that was facilitated by the rapid development of Korean astronomy. It wasn't until the Joseon dynasty that Confucian themes began to take root in Korean paintings, used in harmony with indigenous aspects.

The history of Korean painting has been characterized by the use monochromatic works of black brushwork, often on mulberry paper or silk. This style is evident in "Min-Hwa", or colorful folk art, tomb paintings, and ritual and festival arts, both of which incorporated an extensive use of colour.

== South Asian ==
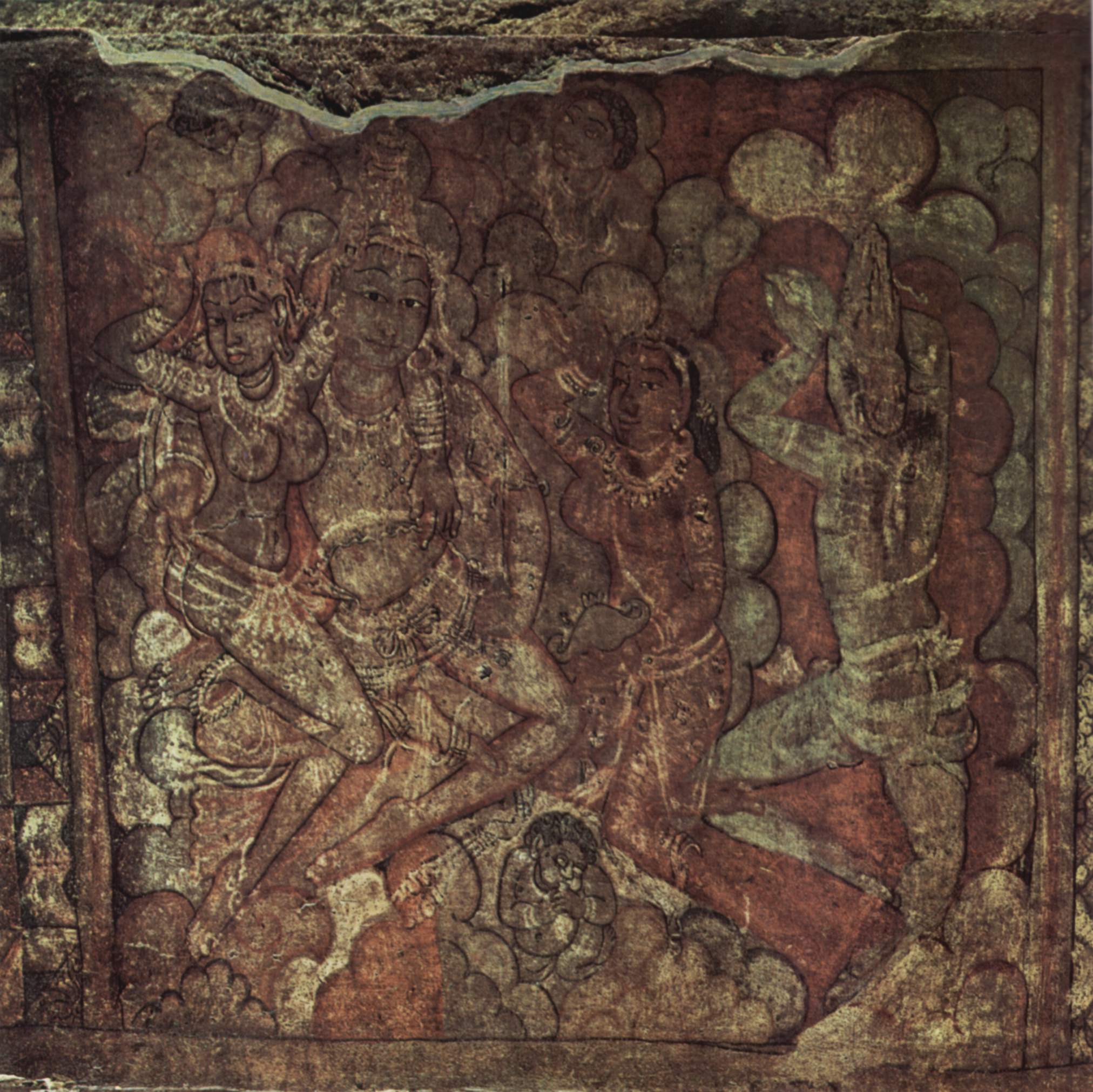
Floating Figures Dancing, a mural of c. 850.

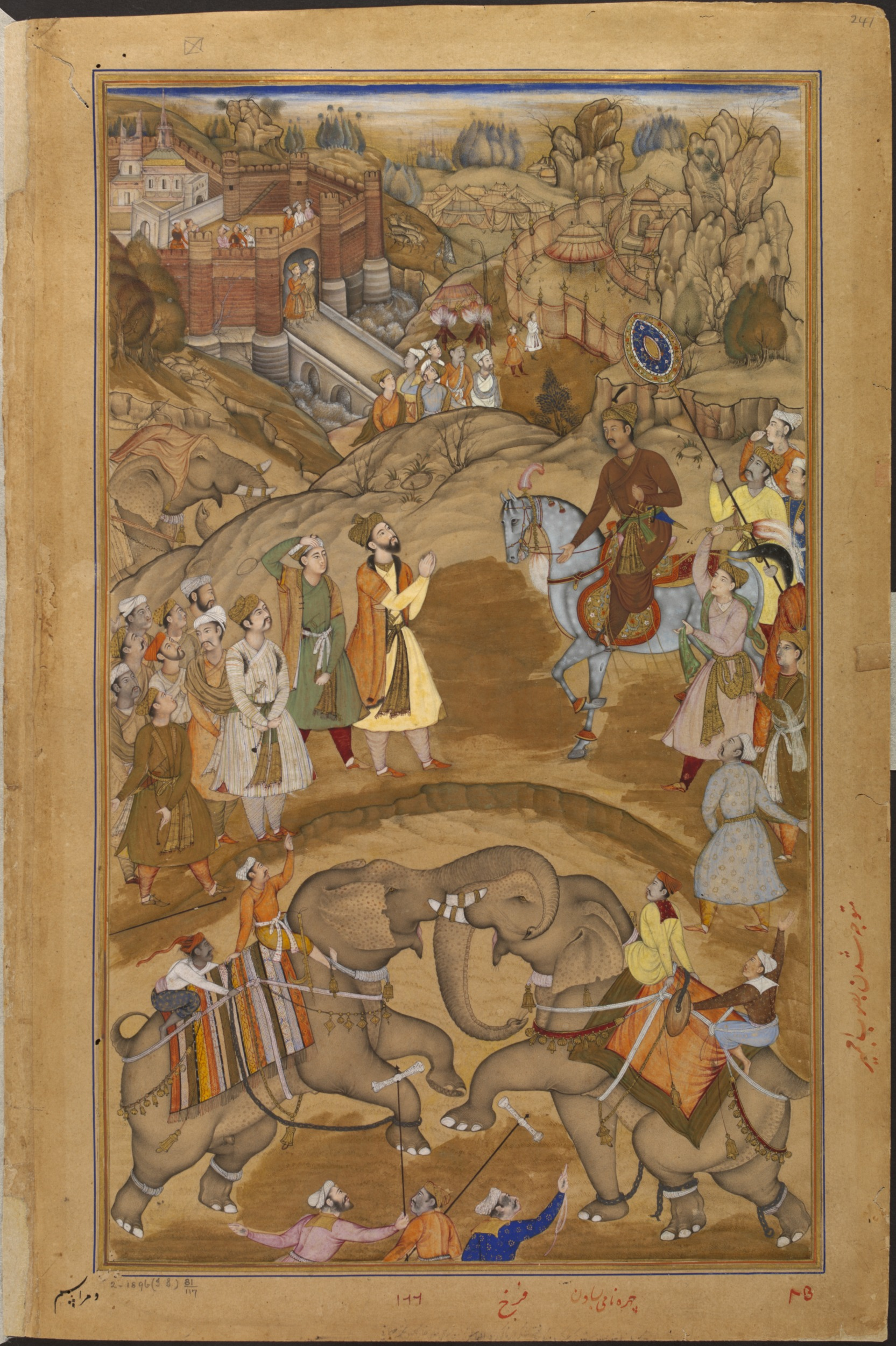
Mughal, Akbar Being Received by Khan Kilan, the Governor of Nagaur, in 1570, Akbarnama

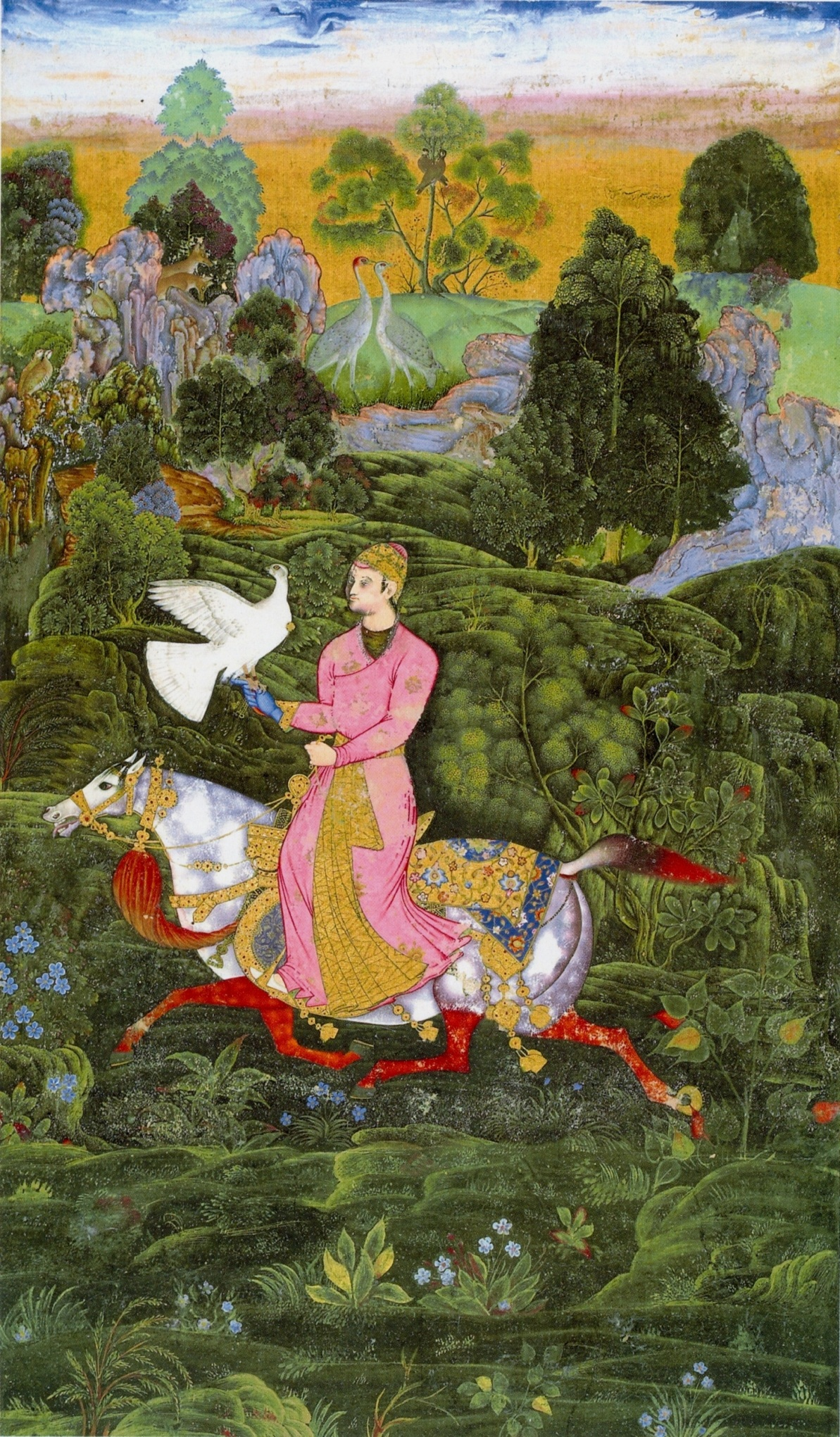
Deccan painting; the young Ibrahim Adil Shah II hawking, c. 1590

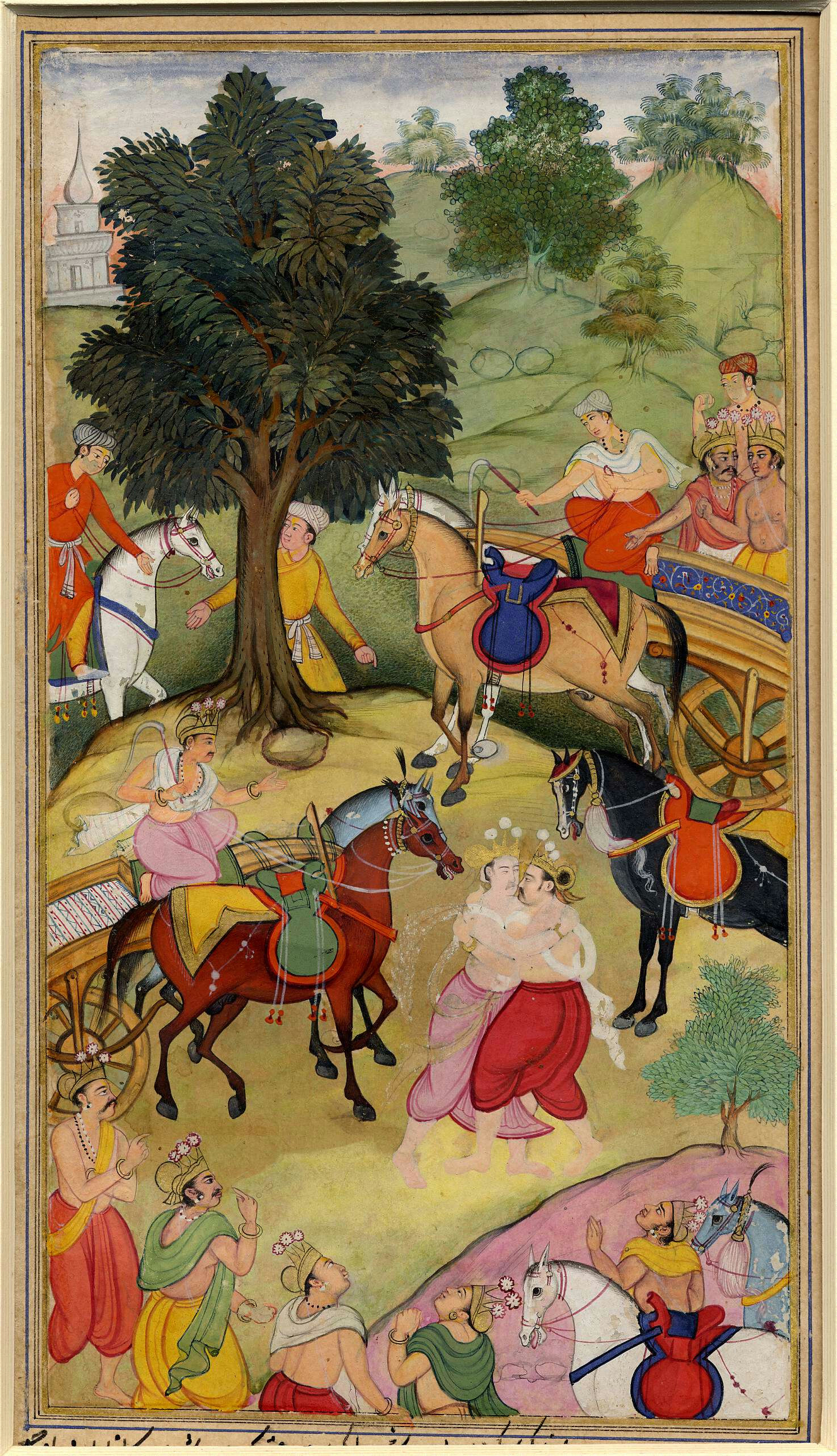
Mughal, Yudishthira wrestling with Karna, 1598

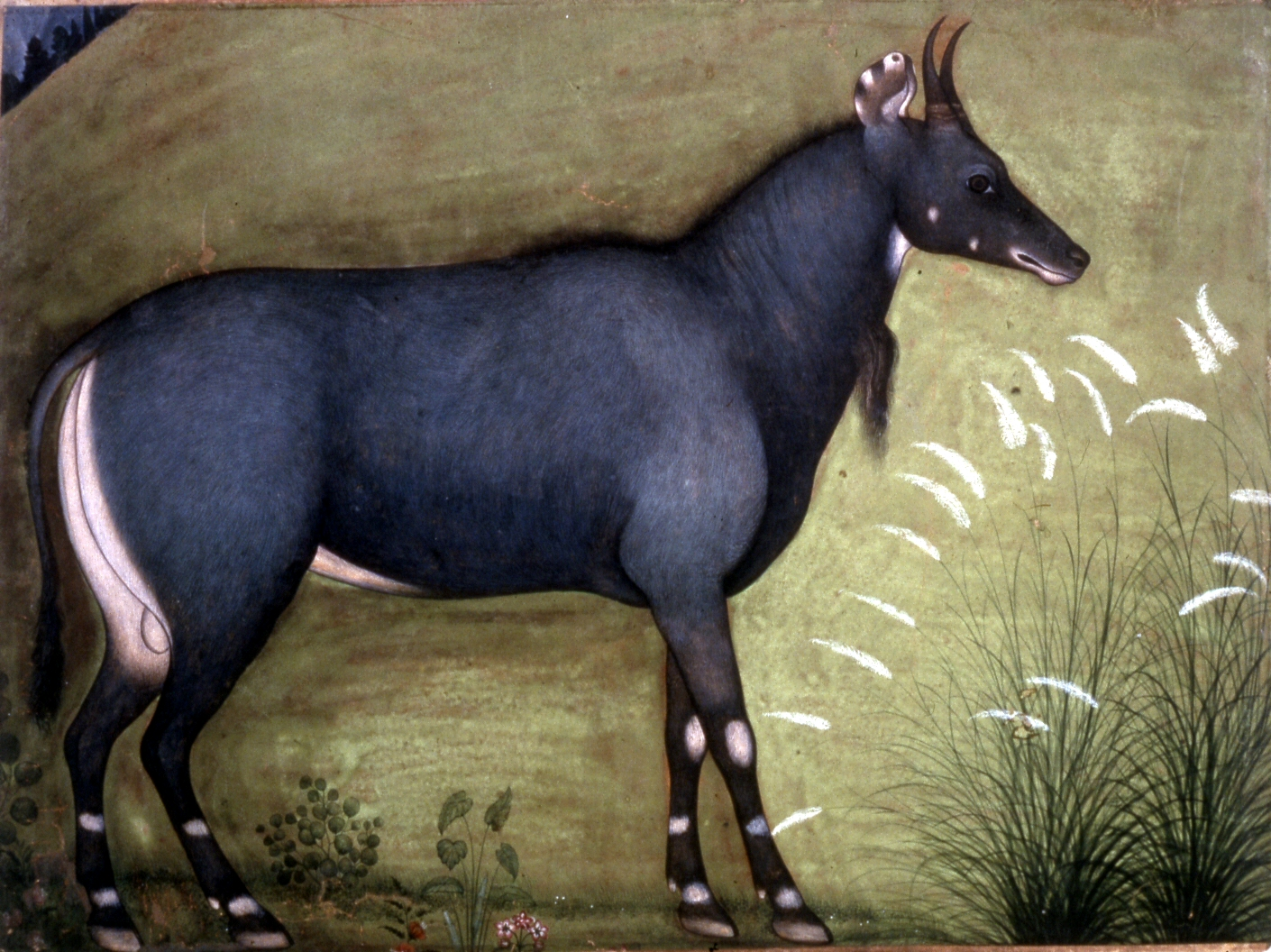
Mughal nilgai, 1625–1650

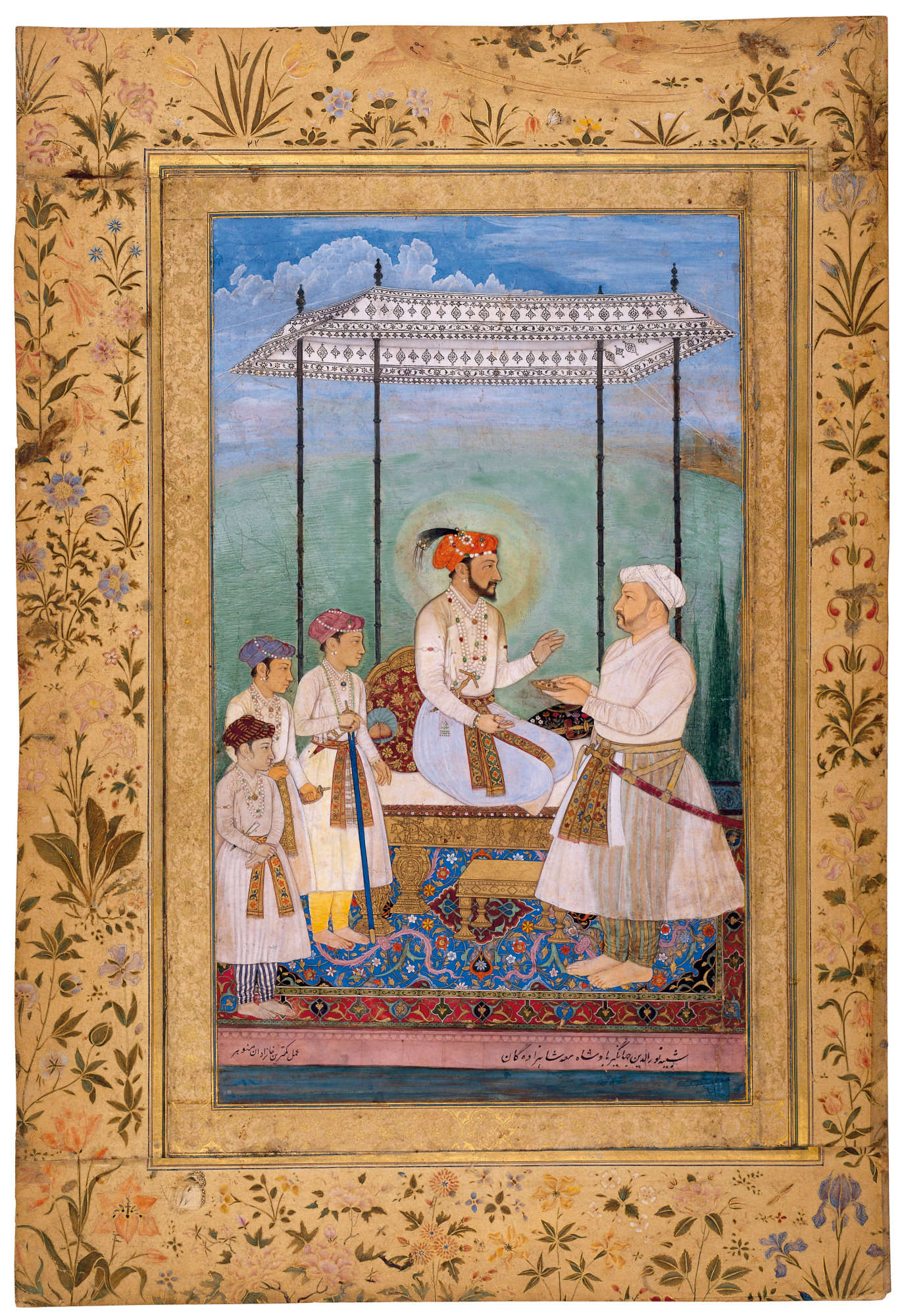
Emperor Shah Jahan and sons, c. 1628 or later. Mughal portraits normally use profile views.

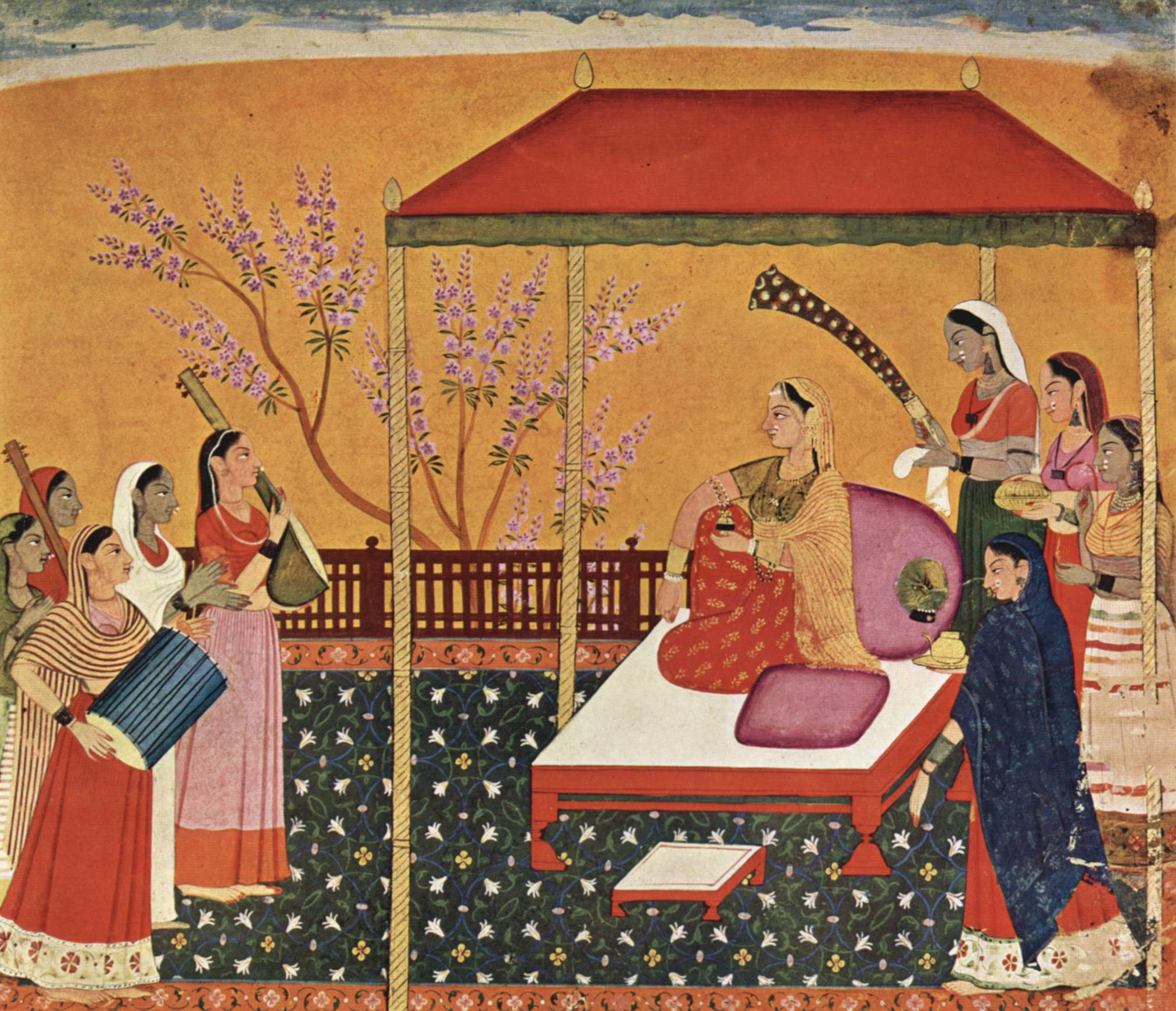
A Lady Listening to Music, c. 1750.

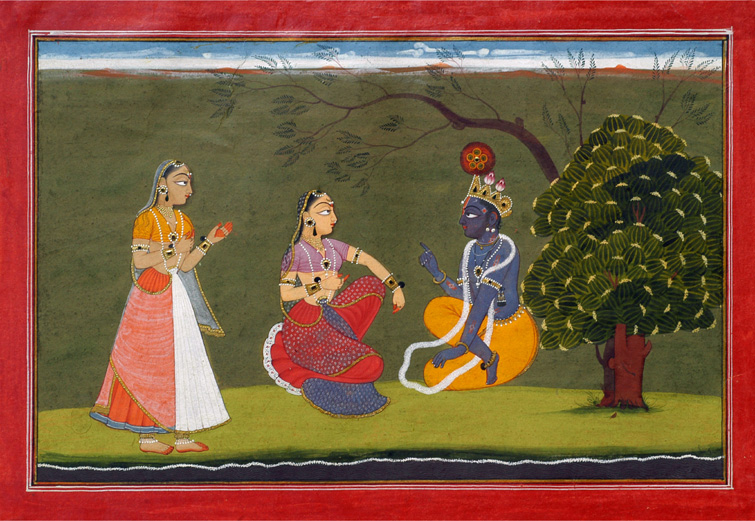
Bahsoli painting of Radha and Krishna in Discussion, c. 1730.

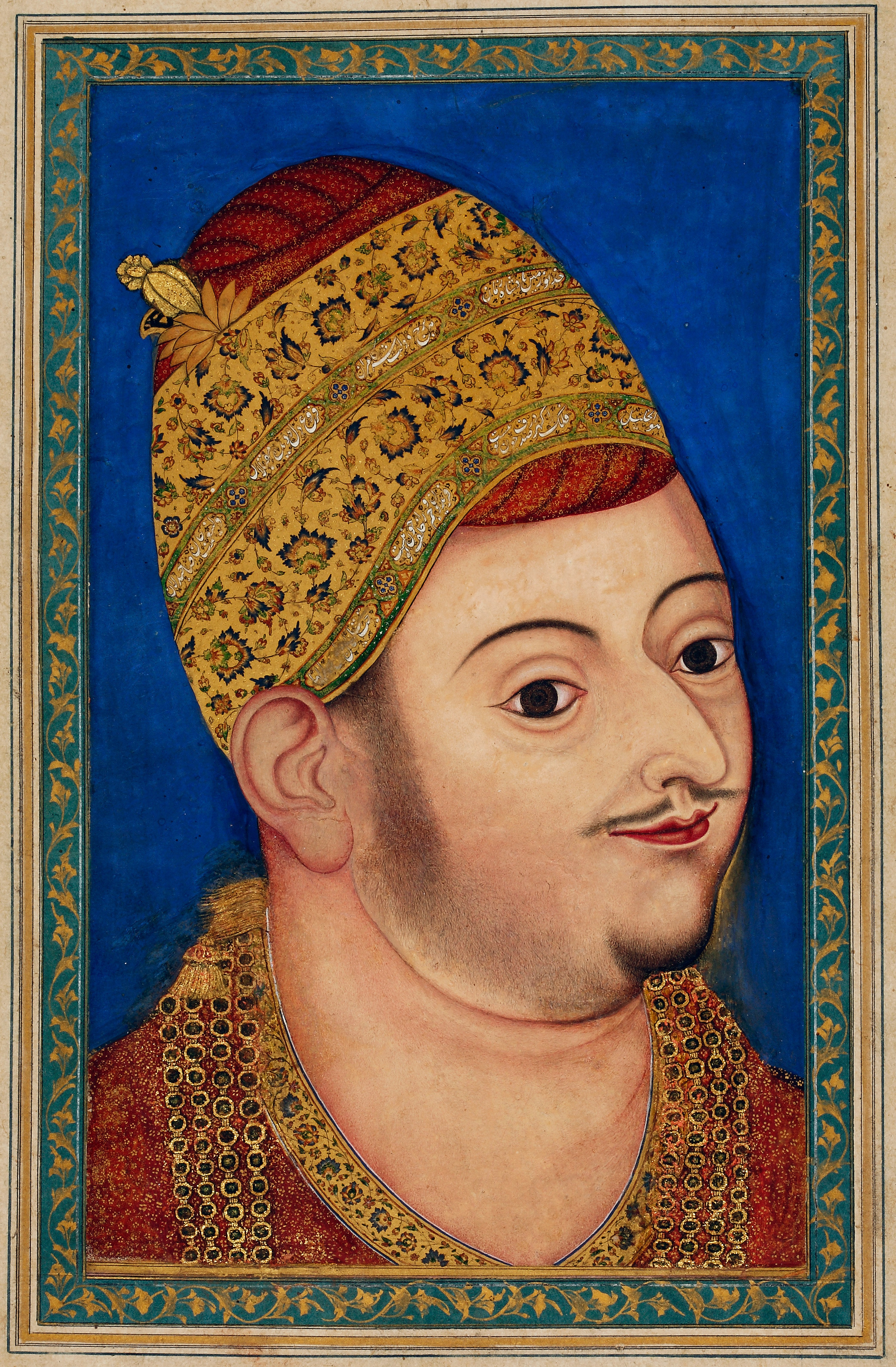
Deccan painting, Sultan Ibrahim Adil Shah II of Bijapur, c. 1590. A three-quarter view which gives a powerful and lively impression of the sitter, despite lacking both Mughal precision, and very coherent modelling of the surfaces.

Mughal portrait of Raja Jagat Singh of Nurpur (reigned 1618–1646), probably 1619

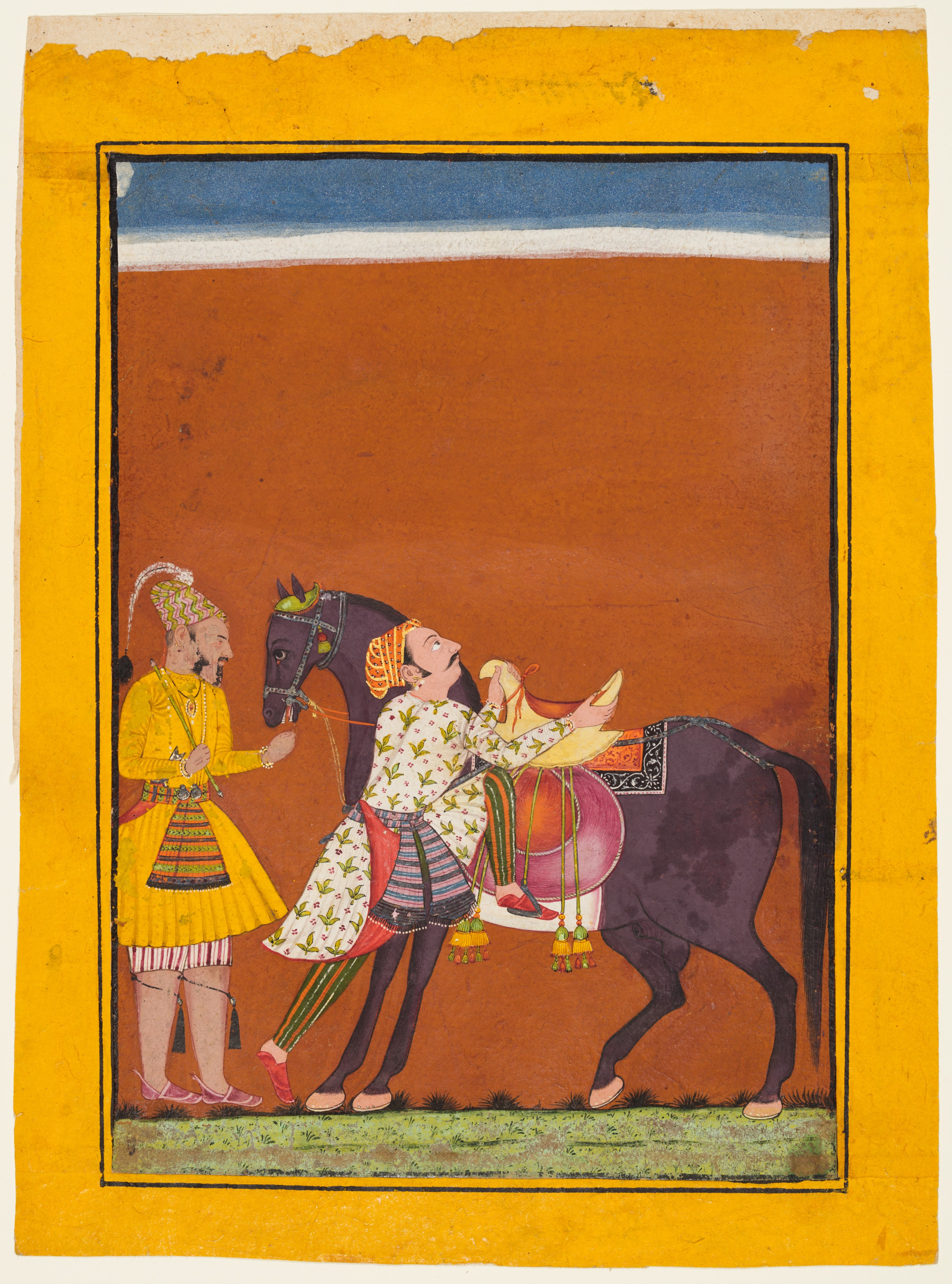
Pahari painting, Chamba, c. 1665, a warrior mounts his horse

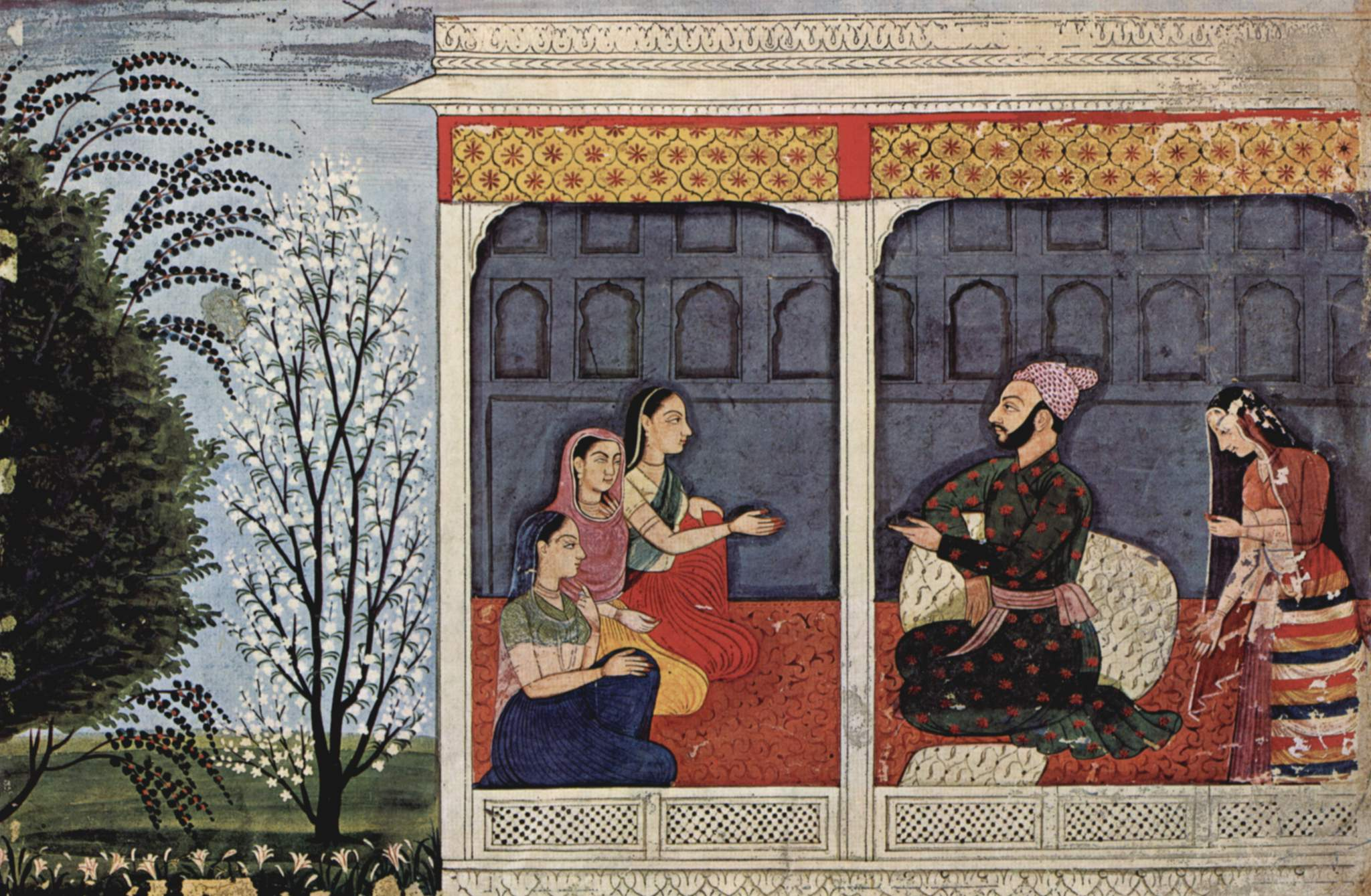
Portrait of the Govardhân Chand, Pahari painting style, c. 1750.

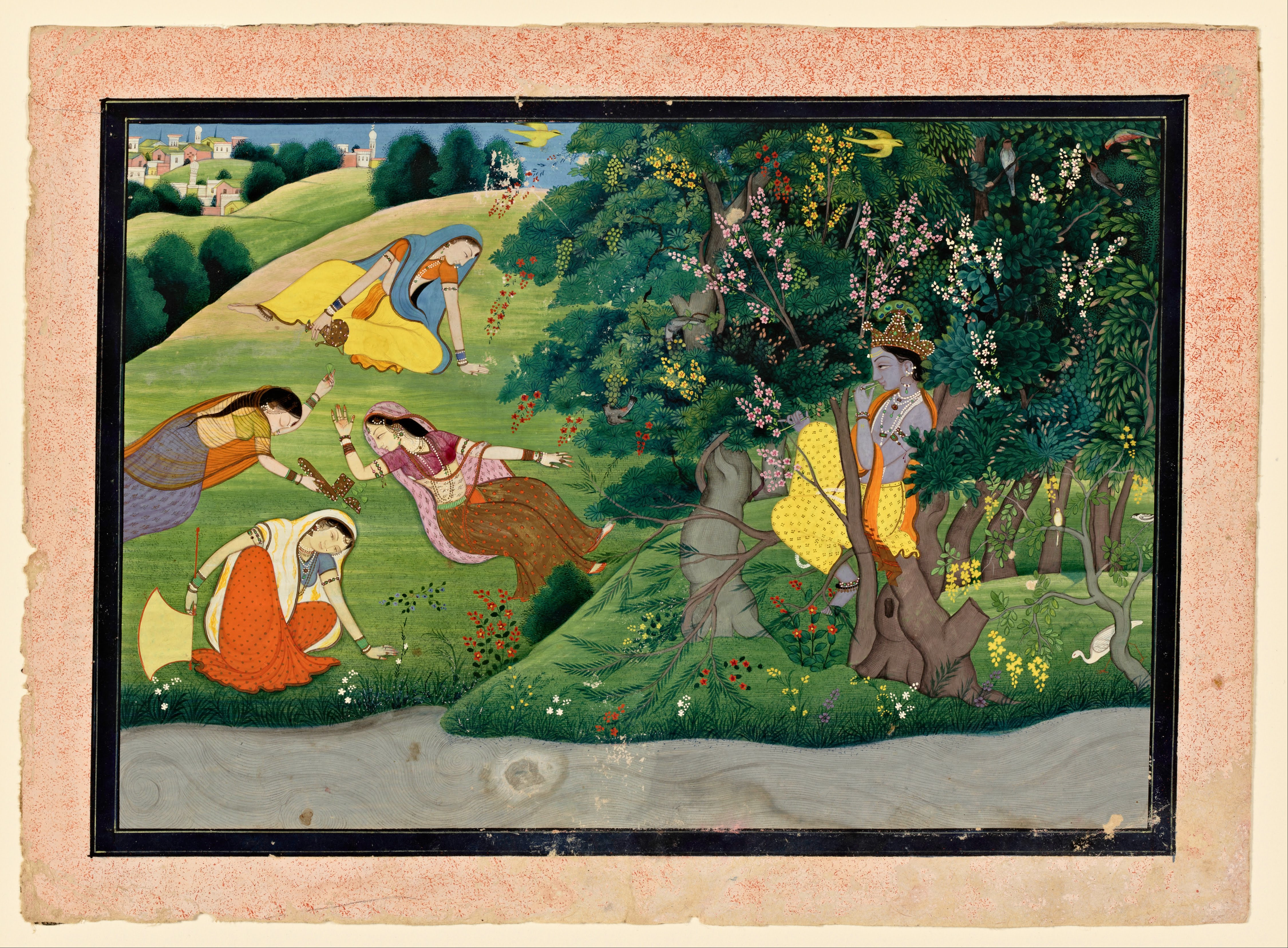
Kangra painting, c. 1775, Krishna plays his flute to the gopis

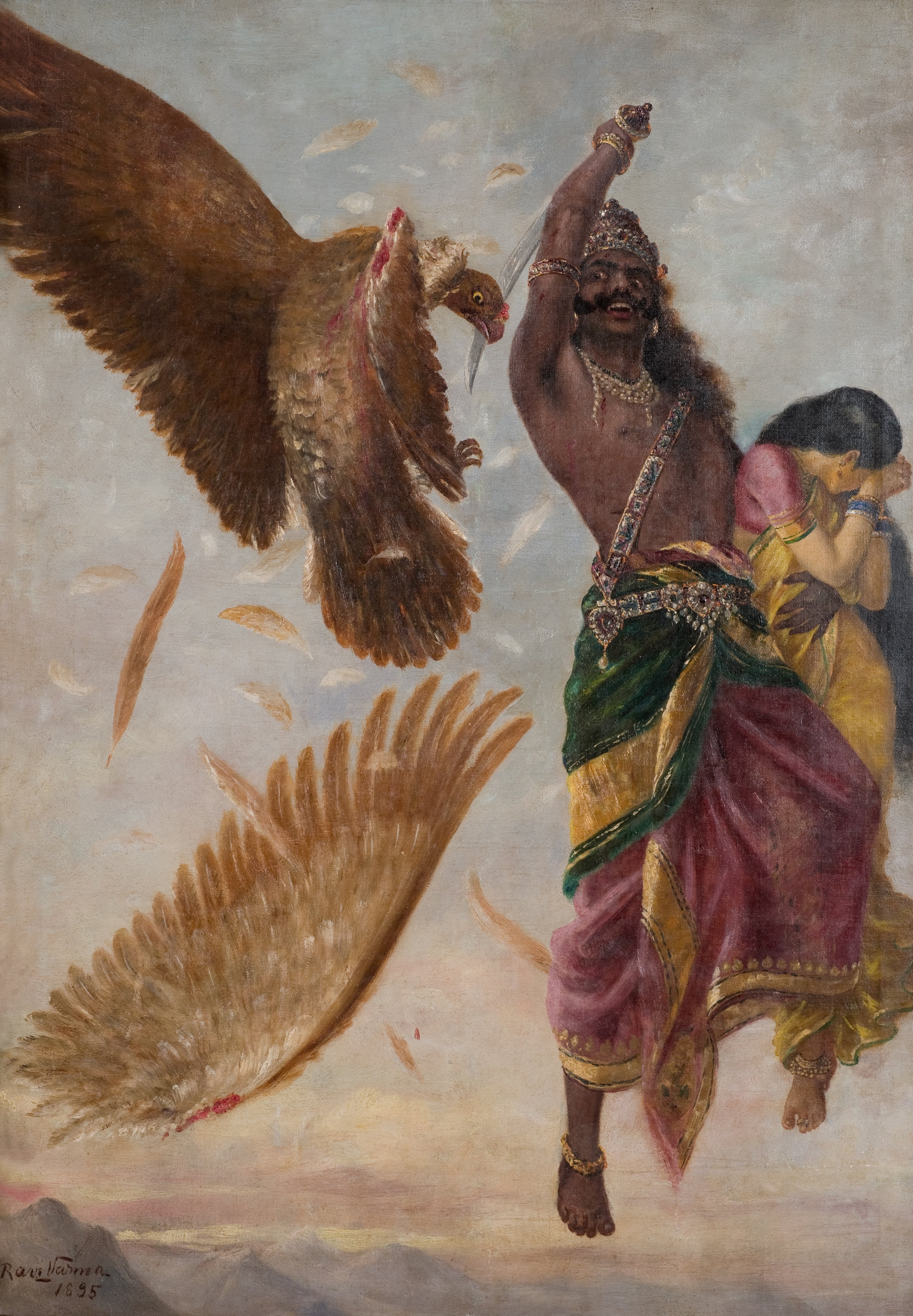
Ravana kills Jathayu; the captive Sita despairs, by Raja Ravi Varma

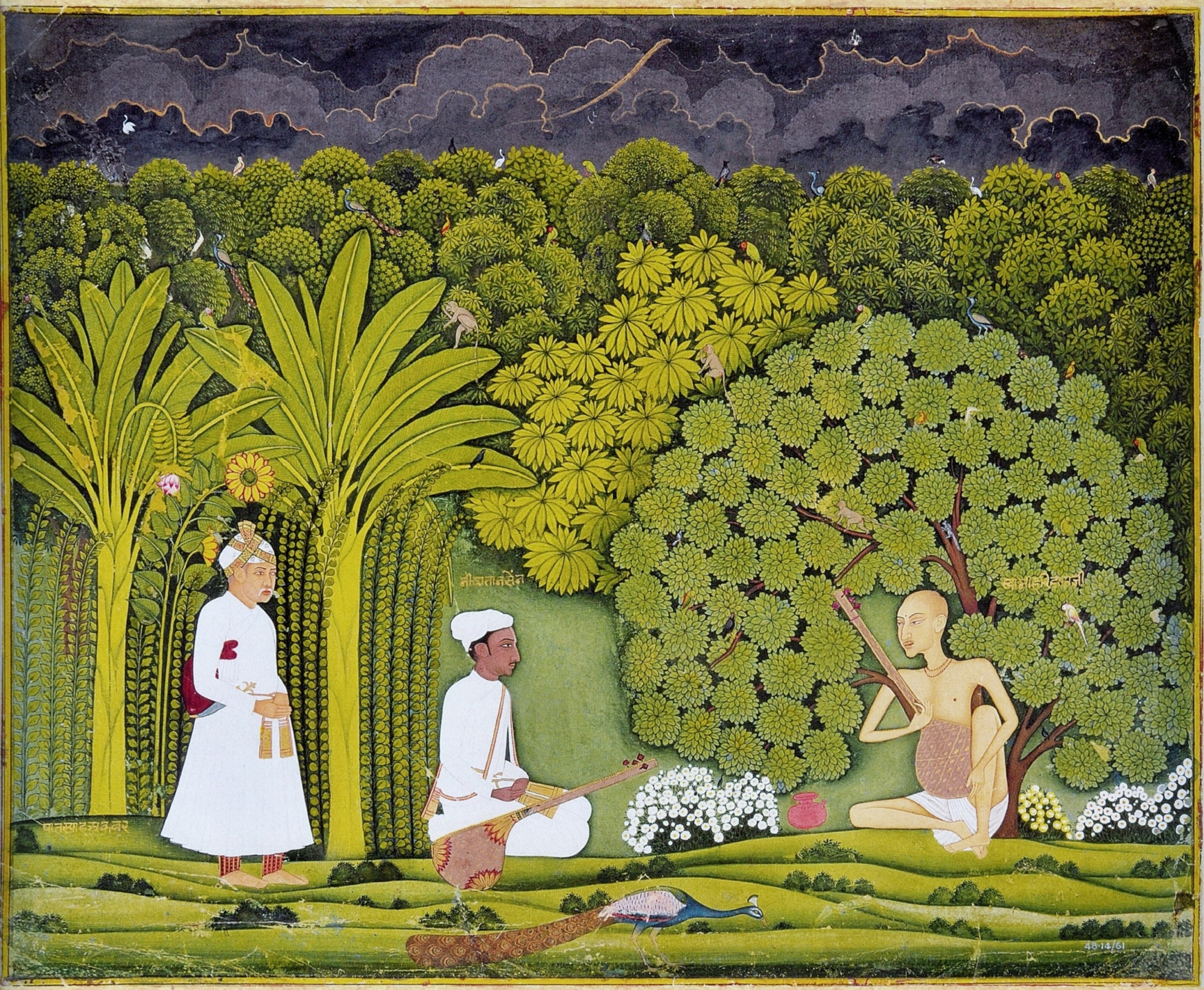
Akbar and Tansen Visit Haridas in Vrindavan, Rajasthan style, c. 1750.

Krishna Summoning the Cows, Pahari painting, Bilaspur, 18th century

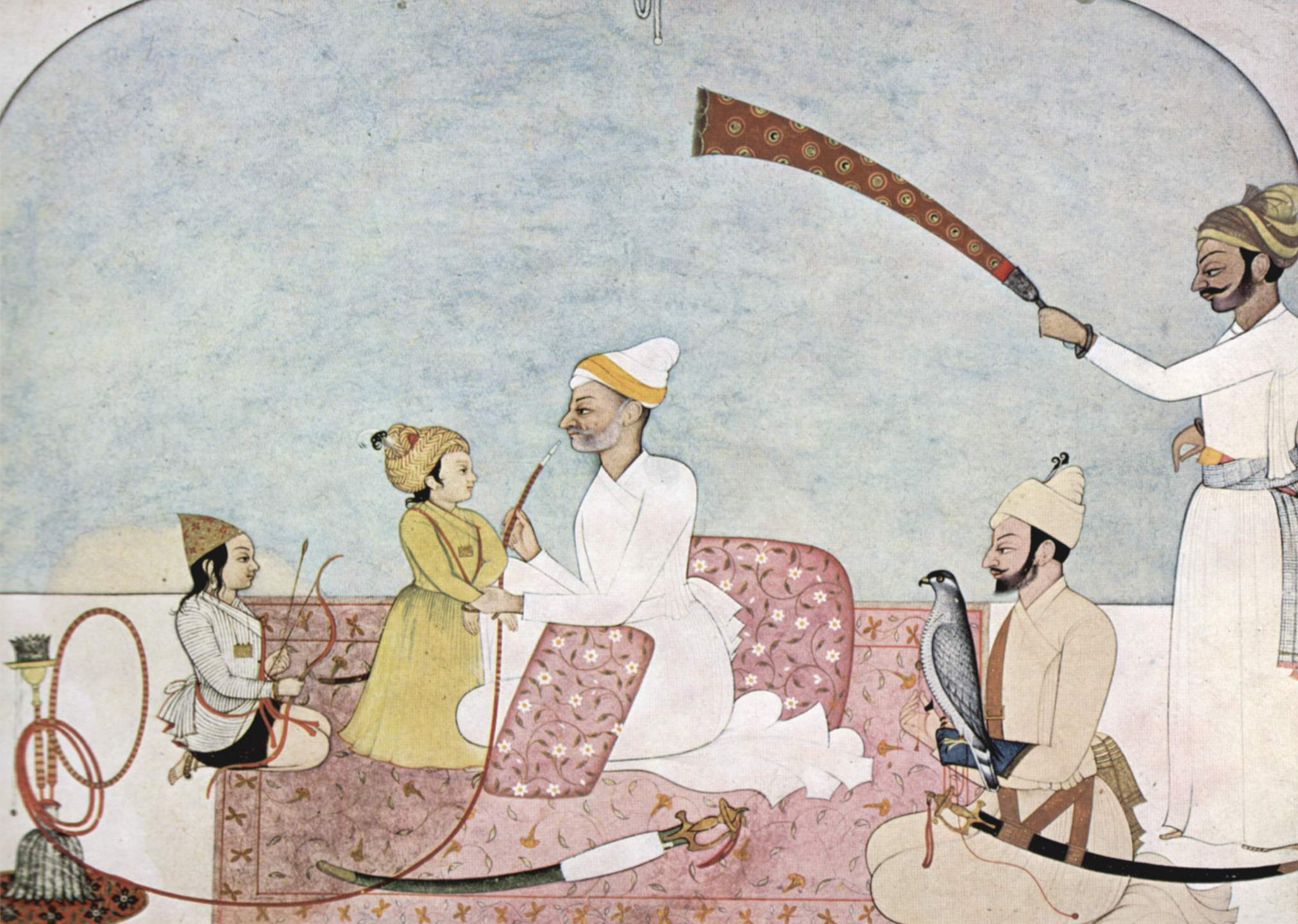
A man with children, Pahari painting style, 1760.

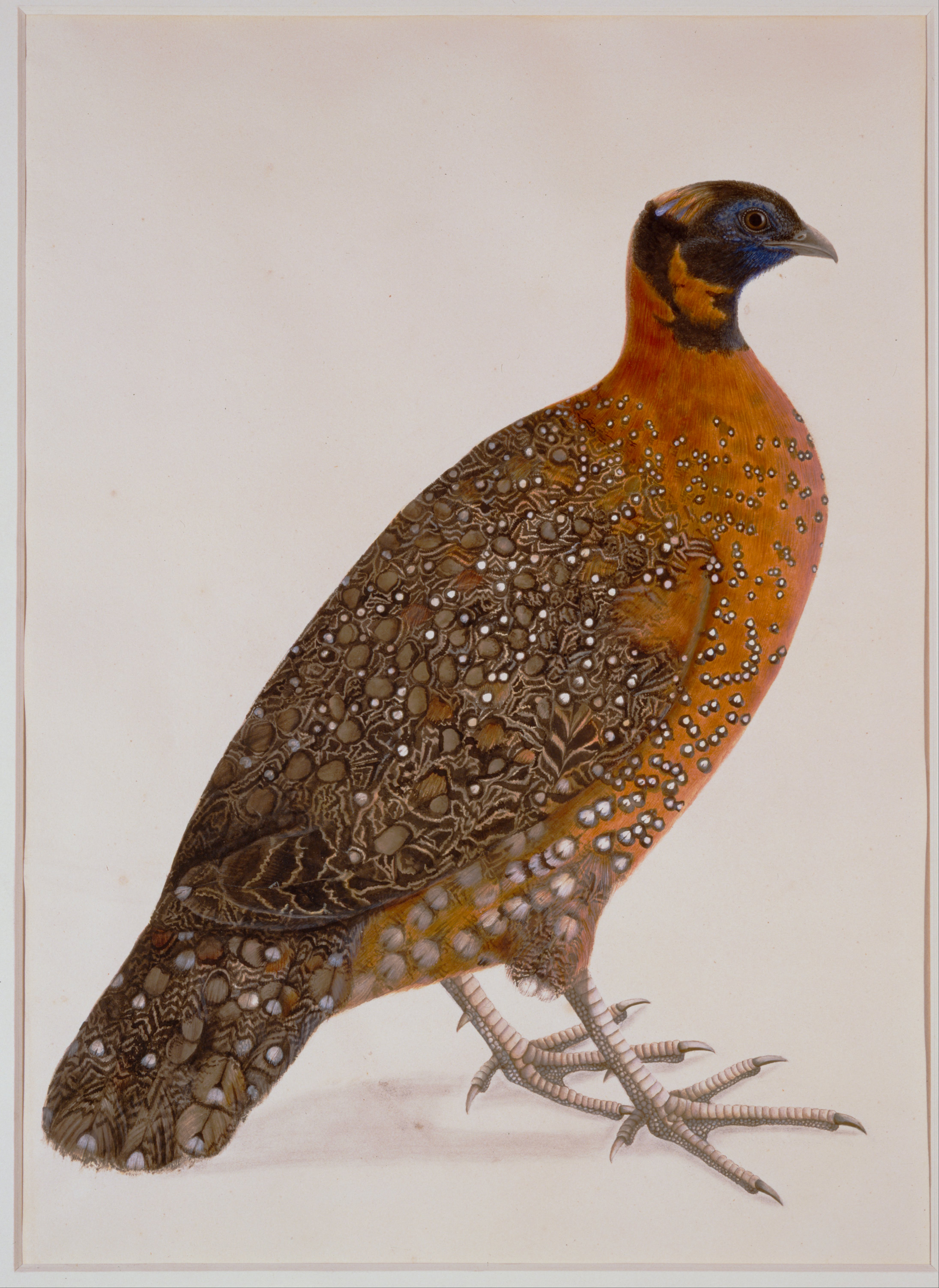
Company style, 1770s, Crimson Horned Pheasant (Satyr Tragapan)

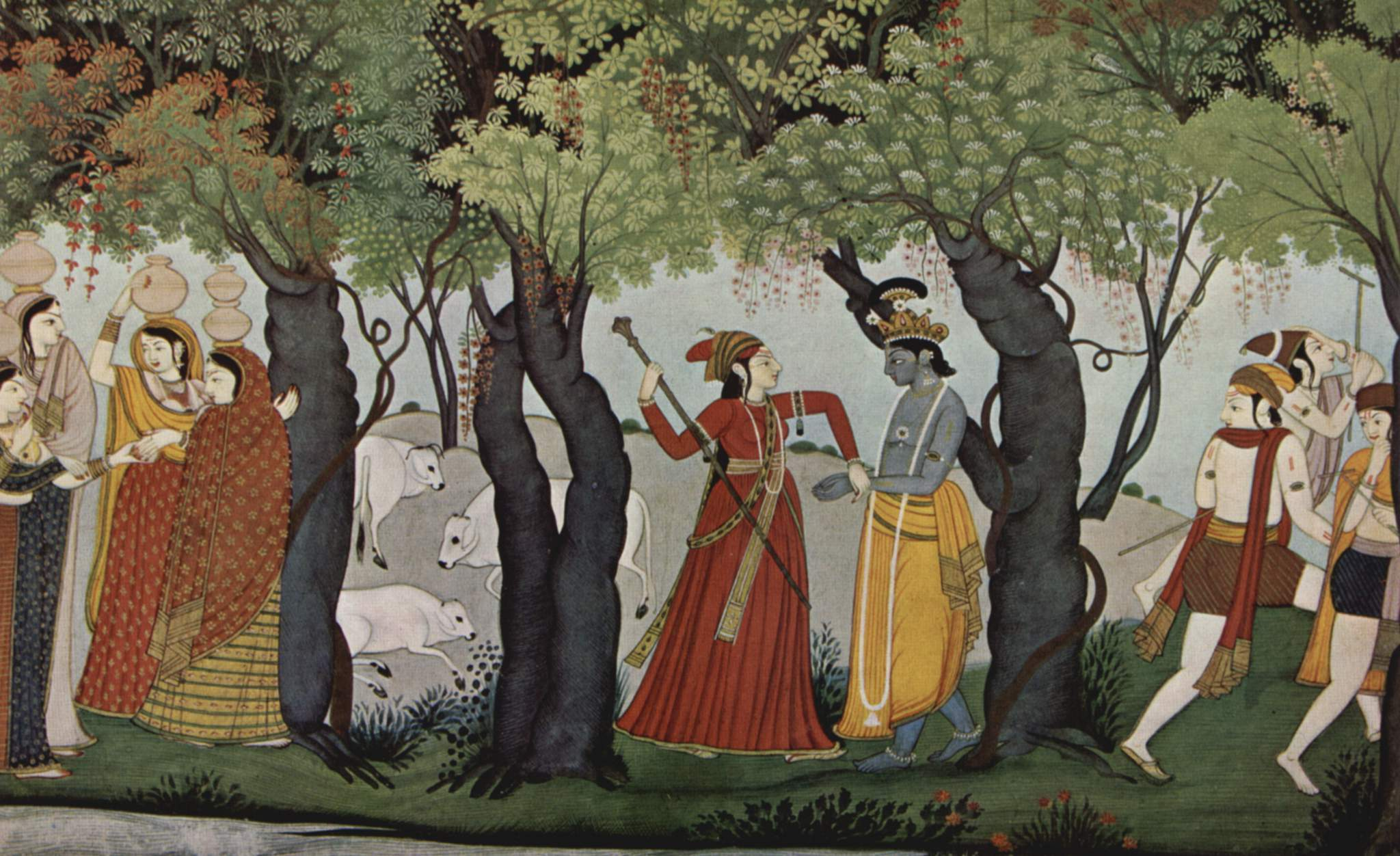
Râdhâ arrests Krishna, Pahari painting style, 1770.

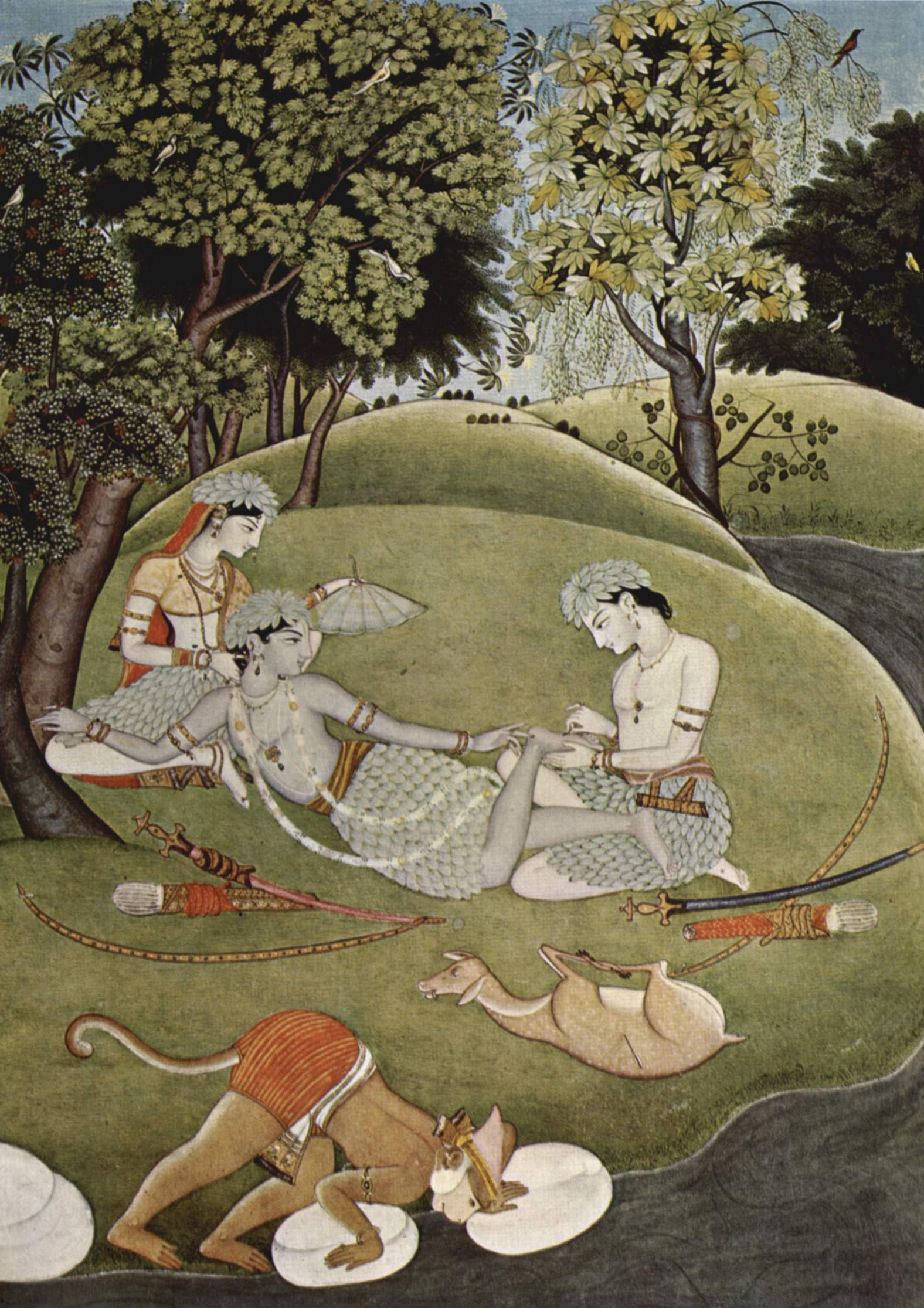
Rama and Sita in the Forest, Pahari painting style, 1780.

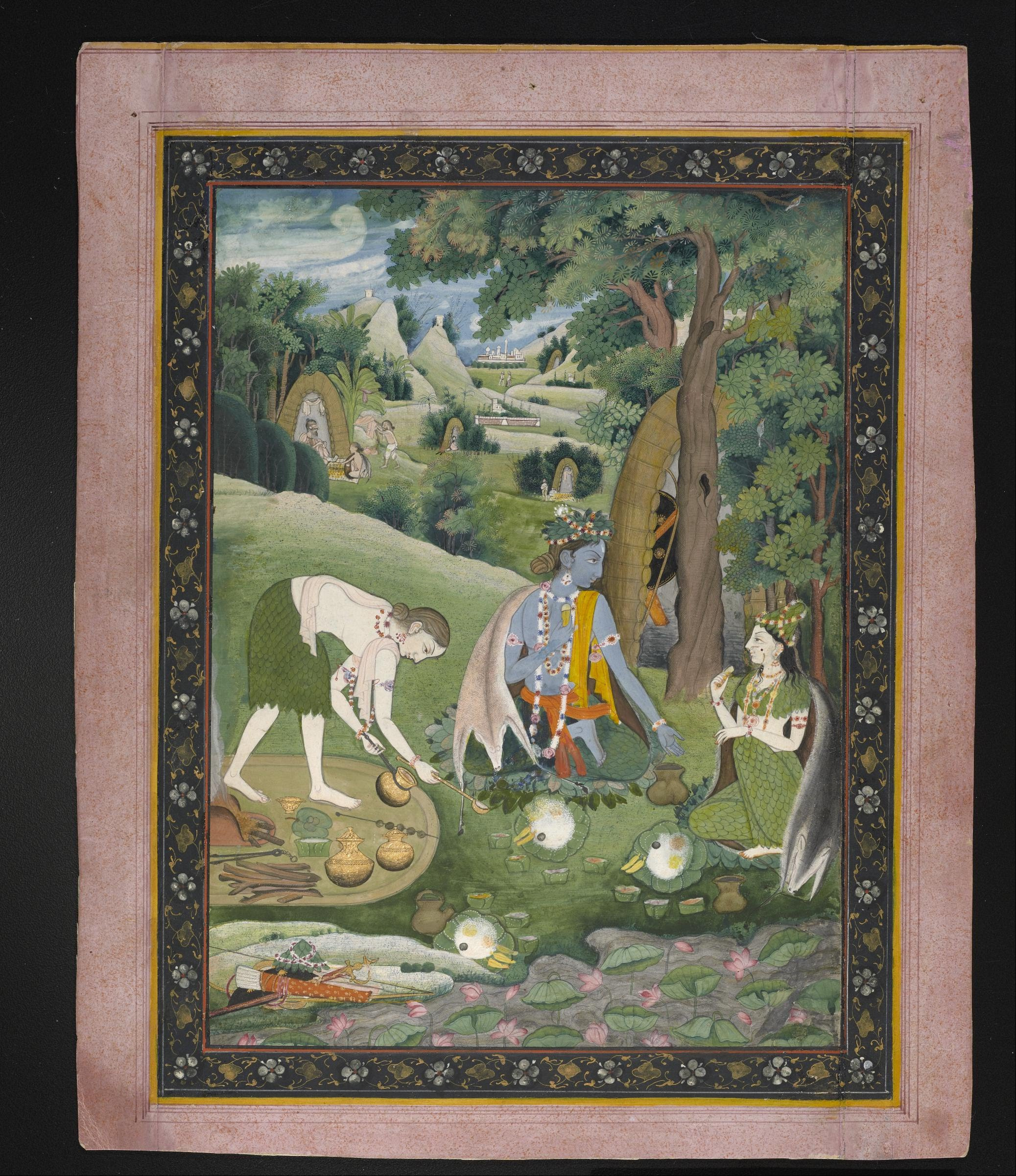
Late Kangra painting, 1815/1825, Rama, Lakshmana, and Sita

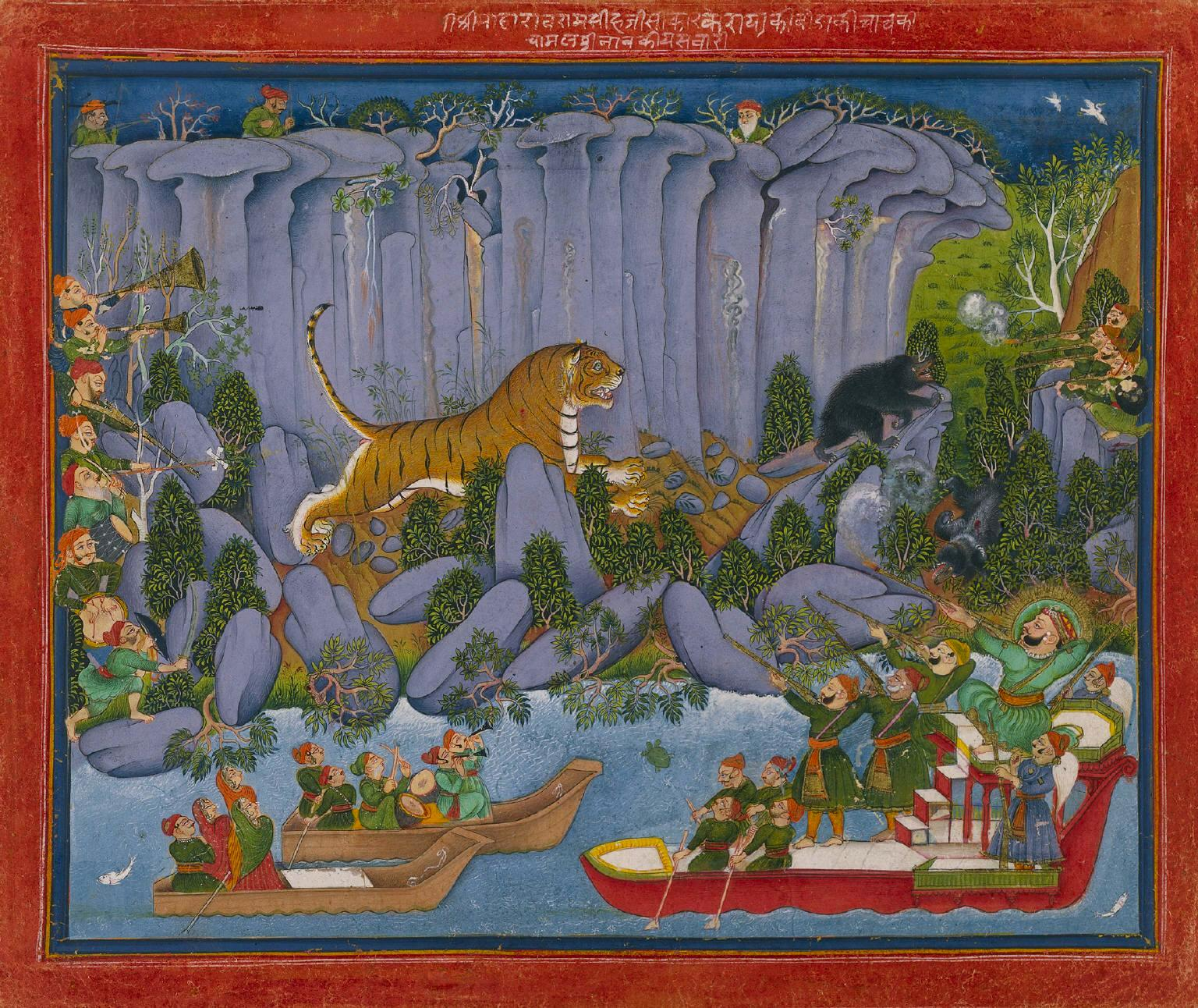
Late Rajput painting, Kota, c. 1830s, Ram Singh II Tiger Hunting

=== Indian ===
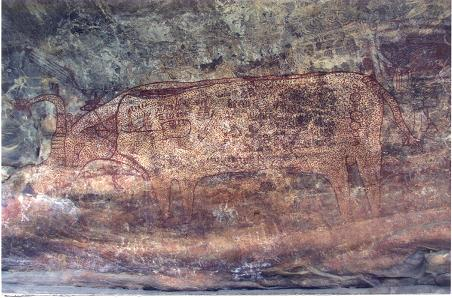
Rock Shelters of Bhimbetka, rock painting, Stone Age, India

Indian paintings historically revolved around the religious deities and kings. Indian art is a collective term for several different schools of art that existed in the Indian subcontinent. The paintings varied from large frescoes of Ajanta to the intricate Mughal miniature paintings to the metal embellished works from the Tanjore school. The paintings from the Gandhar–Taxila are influenced by the Persian works in the west. The eastern style of painting was mostly developed around the Nalanda school of art. The works are mostly inspired by various scenes from Indian mythology.

==== History ====
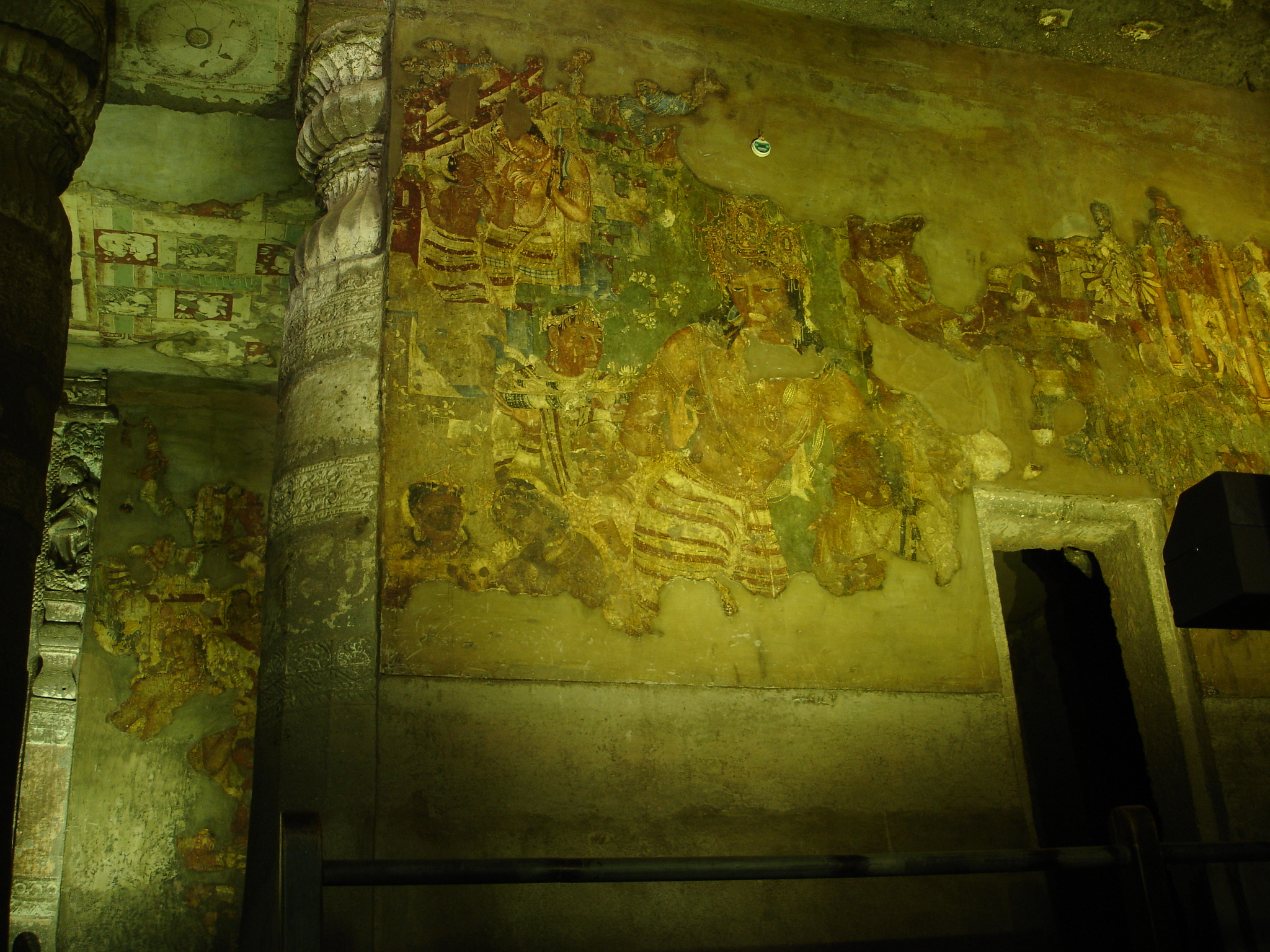
A fresco from Cave 1 of Ajanta.

The earliest Indian paintings were the rock paintings of prehistoric times, the petroglyphs as found in places like the Rock Shelters of Bhimbetka, and some of them are older than 5500 BC. Such works continued and after several millennia, in the 7th century, carved pillars of Ajanta, Maharashtra state present a fine example of Indian paintings, and the colors, mostly various shades of red and orange, were derived from minerals.

Ajanta Caves in Maharashtra, India are rock-cut cave monuments dating back to the 2nd century BCE and containing paintings and sculpture considered to be masterpieces of both Buddhist religious art and universal pictorial art.

Madhubani painting

Madhubani painting is a style of Indian painting, practiced in the Mithila region of Bihar state, India. The origins of Madhubani painting are shrouded in antiquity.

==== Mughal ====
Two Scribes Seated with Books and a Writing Table Fragment of a decorative margin Northern India (Mughal school), ca. 1640–1650

Mughal painting is a particular style of Indian painting, generally confined to illustrations on the book and done in miniatures, and which emerged, developed and took shape during the period of the Mughal Empire 16th −19th centuries.

==== Rajput ====
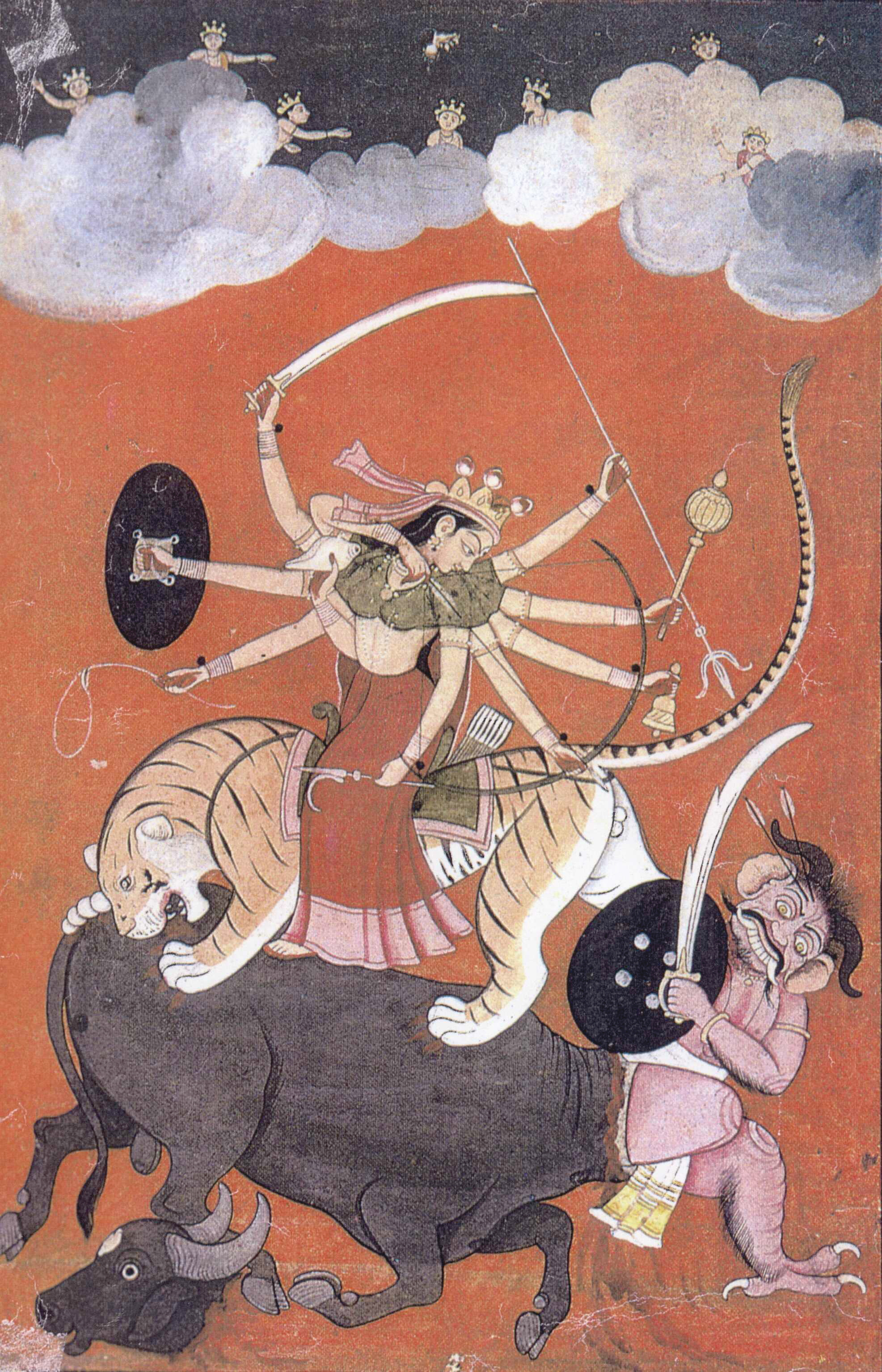
Mother Goddess A miniature painting of the Pahari style, dating to the eighteenth century. Pahari and Rajput miniatures share many common features.

Rajput painting evolved and flourished during the 18th century, in the royal courts of Rajputana, India. Each Rajput kingdom evolved a distinct style, but with certain common features. Rajput paintings depict a number of themes, events of epics like the Ramayana and the Mahabharata, Krishna's life, beautiful landscapes, and humans. Miniatures were the preferred medium of Rajput painting, but several manuscripts also contain Rajput paintings, and paintings were even done on the walls of palaces, inner chambers of the forts, havelies, particularly, the havelis of Shekhawait.

The colors extracted from certain minerals, plant sources, conch shells, and were even derived by processing precious stones, gold and silver were used. The preparation of desired colors was a lengthy process, sometimes taking weeks. Brushes used were very fine.

==== Tanjore ====
Tanjore painting is an important form of classical South Indian painting native to the town of Tanjore in Tamil Nadu. The art form dates back to the early 9th century, a period dominated by the Chola rulers, who encouraged art and literature. These paintings are known for their elegance, rich colors, and attention to detail. The themes for most of these paintings are Hindu Gods and Goddesses and scenes from Hindu mythology. In modern times, these paintings have become a much sought after souvenir during festive occasions in South India.

The process of making a Tanjore painting involves many stages. The first stage involves the making of the preliminary sketch of the image on the base. The base consists of a cloth pasted over a wooden base. Then chalk powder or zinc oxide is mixed with water-soluble adhesive and applied on the base. To make the base smoother, a mild abrasive is sometimes used. After the drawing is made, decoration of the jewellery and the apparels in the image is done with semi-precious stones. Laces or threads are also used to decorate the jewellery. On top of this, the gold foils are pasted. Finally, dyes are used to add colors to the figures in the paintings.

==== Madras School ====
During British rule in India, the crown found that Madras had some of the most talented and intellectual artistic minds in the world. As the British had also established a huge settlement in and around Madras, Georgetown was chosen to establish an institute that would cater to the artistic expectations of the royal family in London. This has come to be known as the Madras School of Art. At first traditional artists were employed to produce exquisite varieties of furniture, metal work, and curios and their work was sent to the royal palaces of the Queen.

Unlike the Bengal School where 'copying' is the norm of teaching, the Madras School flourishes on 'creating' new styles, arguments and trends.

==== Bengal School ====
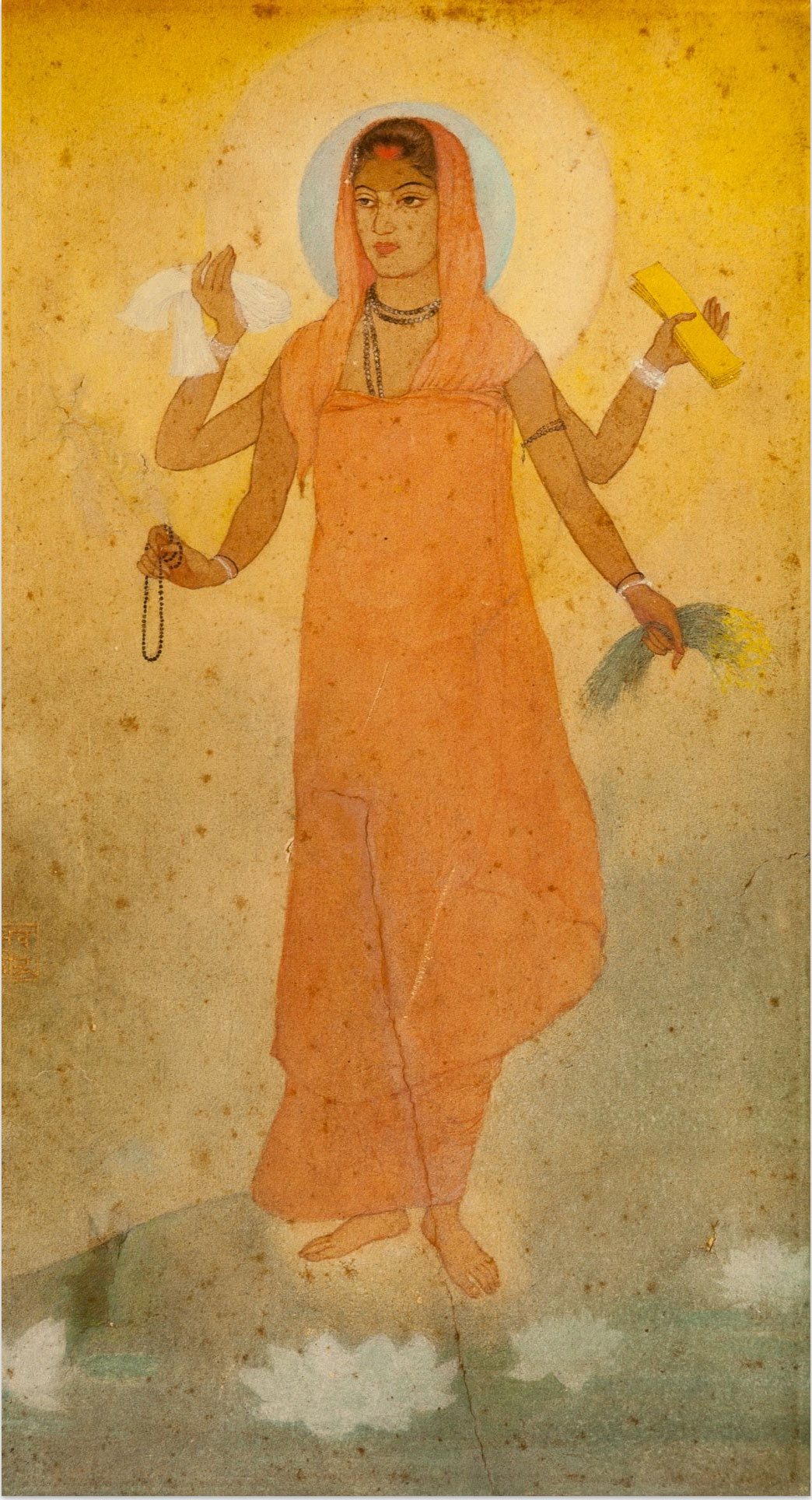
Bharat Mata by Abanindranath Tagore (1871–1951), a nephew of the poet Rabindranath Tagore, and a pioneer of the movement

The Bengal school of art was an influential style of art that flourished in India during the British Raj in the early 20th century. It was associated with Indian nationalism, but was also promoted and supported by many British arts administrators.

The Bengal School arose as an avant garde and nationalist movement reacting against the academic art styles previously promoted in India, both by Indian artists such as Raja Ravi Varma and in British art schools. Following the widespread influence of Indian spiritual ideas in the West, the British art teacher Ernest Binfield Havel attempted to reform the teaching methods at the Calcutta School of Art by encouraging students to imitate Mughal miniatures. This caused immense controversy, leading to a strike by students and complaints from the local press, including from nationalists who considered it to be a retrogressive move. Havel was supported by the artist Abanindranath Tagore, a nephew of the poet Rabindranath Tagore. Tagore painted a number of works influenced by Mughal art, a style that he and Havel believed to be expressive of India's distinct spiritual qualities, as opposed to the "materialism" of the West. Tagore's best-known painting, Bharat Mata (Mother India), depicted a young woman, portrayed with four arms in the manner of Hindu deities, holding objects symbolic of India's national aspirations. Tagore later attempted to develop links with Japanese artists as part of an aspiration to construct a pan-Asianist model of art.

The Bengal School's influence in India declined with the spread of modernist ideas in the 1920s. In the post-independence period, Indian artists showed more adaptability as they borrowed freely from European styles and amalgamated them freely with the Indian motifs to new forms of art. While artists like Francis Newton Souza and Tyeb Mehta were more western in their approach, there were others like Ganesh Pyne and Maqbool Fida Husain who developed thoroughly indigenous styles of work. Today after the process of liberalization of market in India, the artists are experiencing more exposure to the international art-scene which is helping them in emerging with newer forms of art which were hitherto not seen in India. Jitish Kallat had shot to fame in the late 1990s with his paintings which were both modern and beyond the scope of generic definition. However, while artists in India in the new century are trying out new styles, themes and metaphors, it would not have been possible to get such quick recognition without the aid of the business houses which are now entering the art field like they had never before.

==== Modern Indian ====
Amrita Sher-Gil was an Indian painter, sometimes known as India's Frida Kahlo, and today considered an important woman painter of 20th-century India, whose legacy stands at par with that of the Masters of Bengal Renaissance; she is also the 'most expensive' woman painter of India.

Today, she is amongst Nine Masters, whose work was declared as art treasures by The Archaeological Survey of India, in 1976 and 1979, and over 100 of her paintings are now displayed at National Gallery of Modern Art, New Delhi.

During the colonial era, Western influences started to make an impact on Indian art. Some artists developed a style that used Western ideas of composition, perspective and realism to illustrate Indian themes. Others, like Jamini Roy, consciously drew inspiration from folk art.

By the time of Independence in 1947, several schools of art in India provided access to modern techniques and ideas. Galleries were established to showcase these artists. Modern Indian art typically shows the influence of Western styles, but is often inspired by Indian themes and images. Major artists are beginning to gain international recognition, initially among the Indian diaspora, but also among non-Indian audiences.

The Progressive Artists' Group, established shortly after India became independent in 1947, was intended to establish new ways of expressing India in the post-colonial era. The founders were six eminent artists – K. H. Ara, S. K. Bakre, H. A. Gade, M.F. Husain, S.H. Raza and F. N. Souza, though the group was dissolved in 1956, it was profoundly influential in changing the idiom of Indian art. Almost all India's major artists in the 1950s were associated with the group. Some of those who are well-known today are Bal Chabda, Manishi Dey, Mukul Dey, V. S. Gaitonde, Ram Kumar, Tyeb Mehta, and Akbar Padamsee. Other famous painters like Jahar Dasgupta, Prokash Karmakar, John Wilkins, Narayanan Ramachandran, and Bijon Choudhuri enriched the art culture of India. They have become the icons of modern Indian art. Art historians like Prof. Rai Anand Krishna have also referred to those works of modern artistes that reflect Indian ethos. Geeta Vadhera has had acclaim in translating complex, Indian spiritual themes onto canvas like Sufi thought, the Upanishads and the Bhagwad Geeta.

Indian art got a boost with the economic liberalization of the country since the early 1990s. Artists from various fields now started bringing in varied styles of work. In post-liberalization India, many artists have established themselves in the international art market like the abstract painter Natvar Bhavsar, figurative artist Devajyoti Ray and sculptor Anish Kapoor whose mammoth postminimalist artworks have acquired attention for their sheer size. Many art houses and galleries have also opened in USA and Europe to showcase Indian artworks.

== South-East Asia ==
=== Indonesian ===
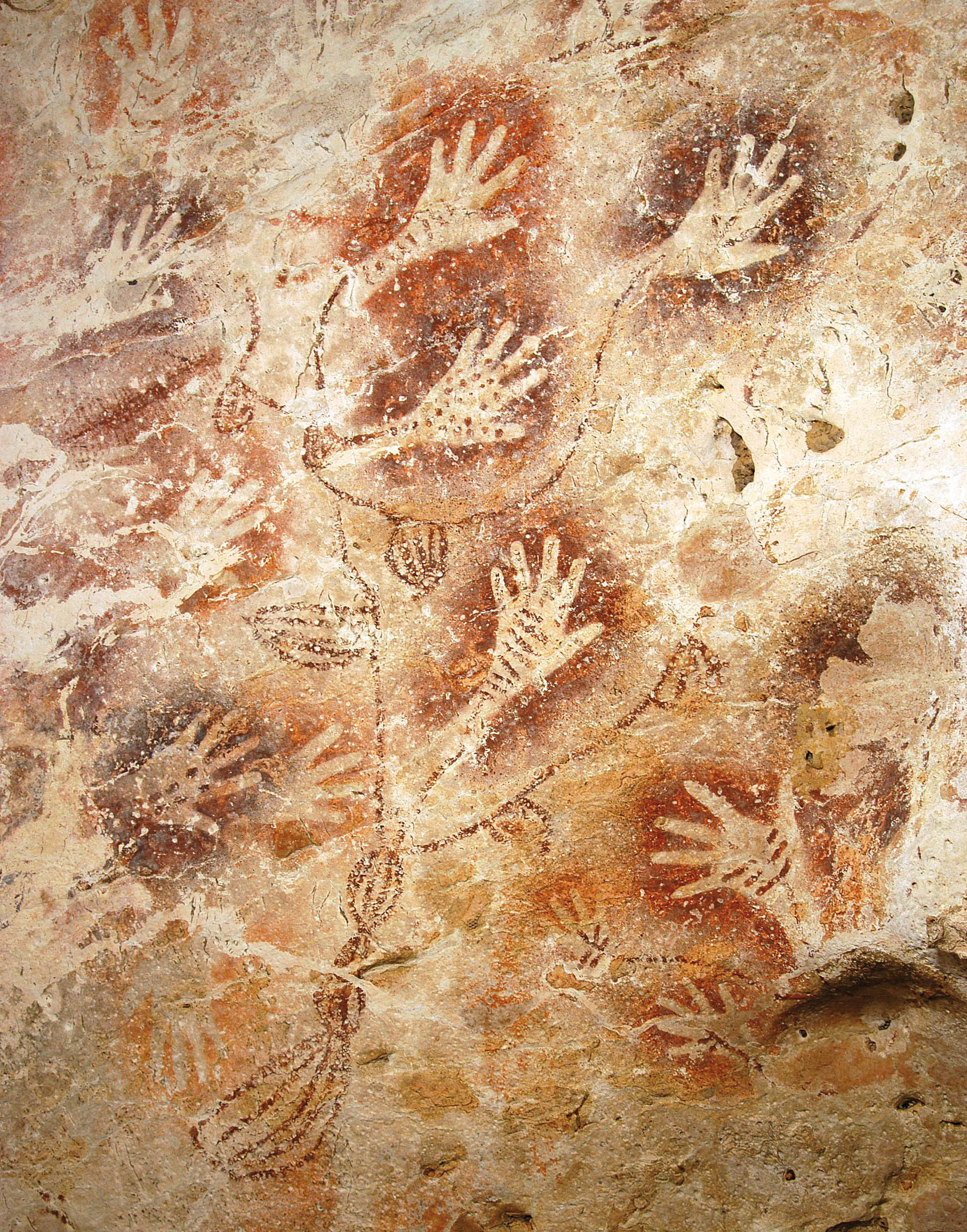
Hand stencils in the "Tree of Life" cave painting in Gua Tewet, Kalimantan, Indonesia

The oldest known cave paintings are more than 44,000–50,000 years old, found in the caves in the district of Maros (Sulawesi, Indonesia). The oldest type of cave paintings are hand stencils and simple geometric shapes; the oldest undisputed examples of figurative cave paintings are somewhat younger, close to 35,000 years old.

The discovery of the then-oldest known figurative art painting, over 40,000 (perhaps as old as 52,000) years old, of an unknown animal, in the cave of Lubang Jeriji Saléh on the Indonesian island of Borneo. In December 2019, however, figurative cave paintings depicting pig hunting in the Maros-Pangkep karst in Sulawesi were estimated to be even older, at least 43,900 years old. The finding was noted to be "the oldest pictorial record of storytelling and the earliest figurative artwork in the world". In 2021, cave art of a pig found in Sulawesi dated to over 45,500 years ago was reported. On July 3, 2024, the journal Nature published research findings indicating that the cave paintings which depict anthropomorphic figures interacting with a pig and measure 36 by 15 inches (91 by 38 cm) in Leang Karampuang are approximately 51,200 years old, establishing them as the oldest known paintings in the world.

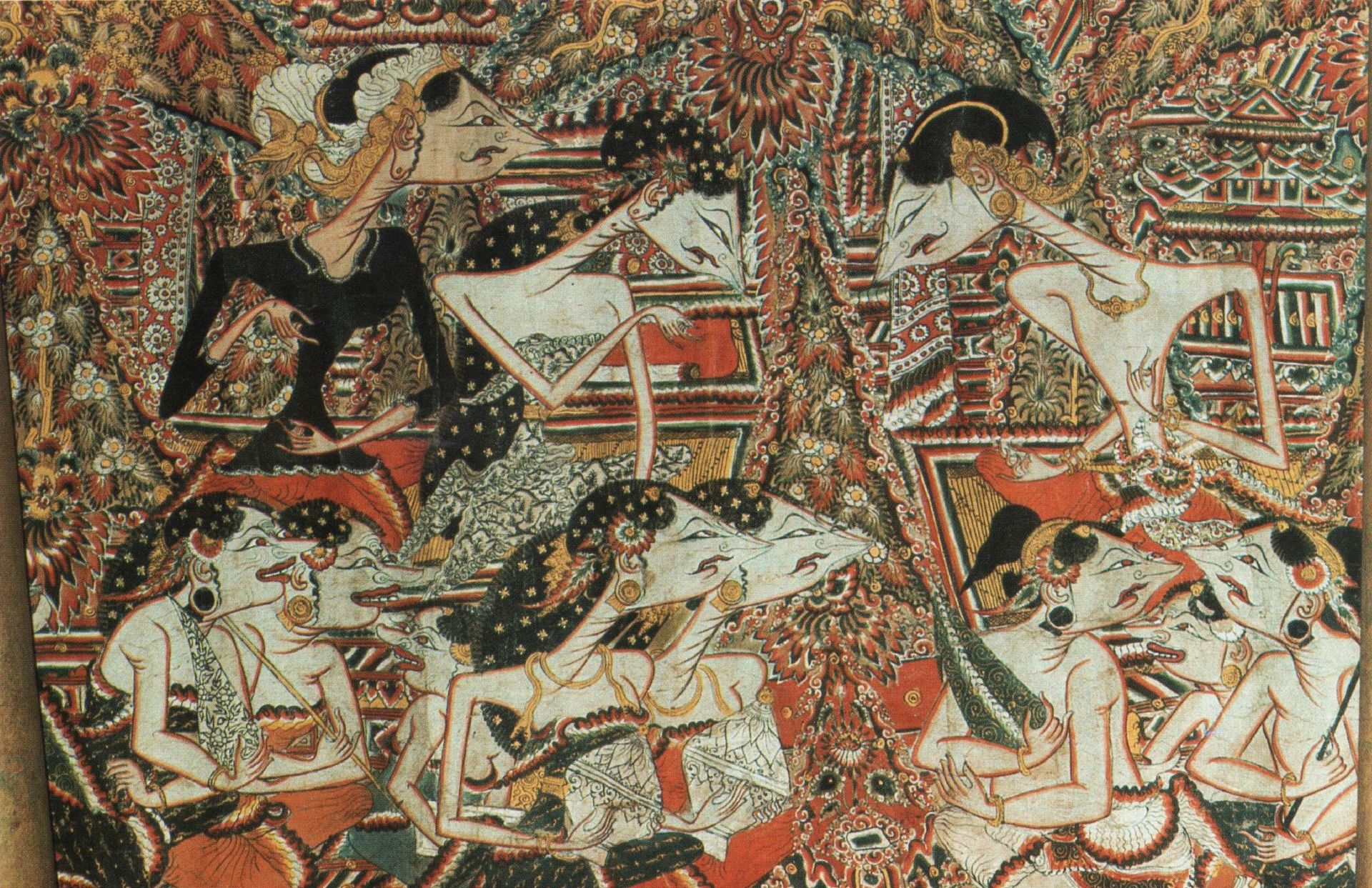
Wayang beber, 17th century

Other examples of Indonesian paintings are the Kenyah decorative art, based on endemic natural motifs such as ferns and hornbills, found decorating the walls of Kenyah longhouses. Other notable traditional art is the geometric Toraja wood carvings. Balinese paintings are initially the narrative images to depict scenes of Balinese legends and religious scripts. The classical Balinese paintings are often decorating the lontar manuscripts and also the ceilings of temples pavilion. Notable modern Indonesian painters in the European tradition include Raden Saleh, Jan Toorop, Basuki Abdullah and Abdullah Suriosubroto, their themes explore landscape and portrait painting.

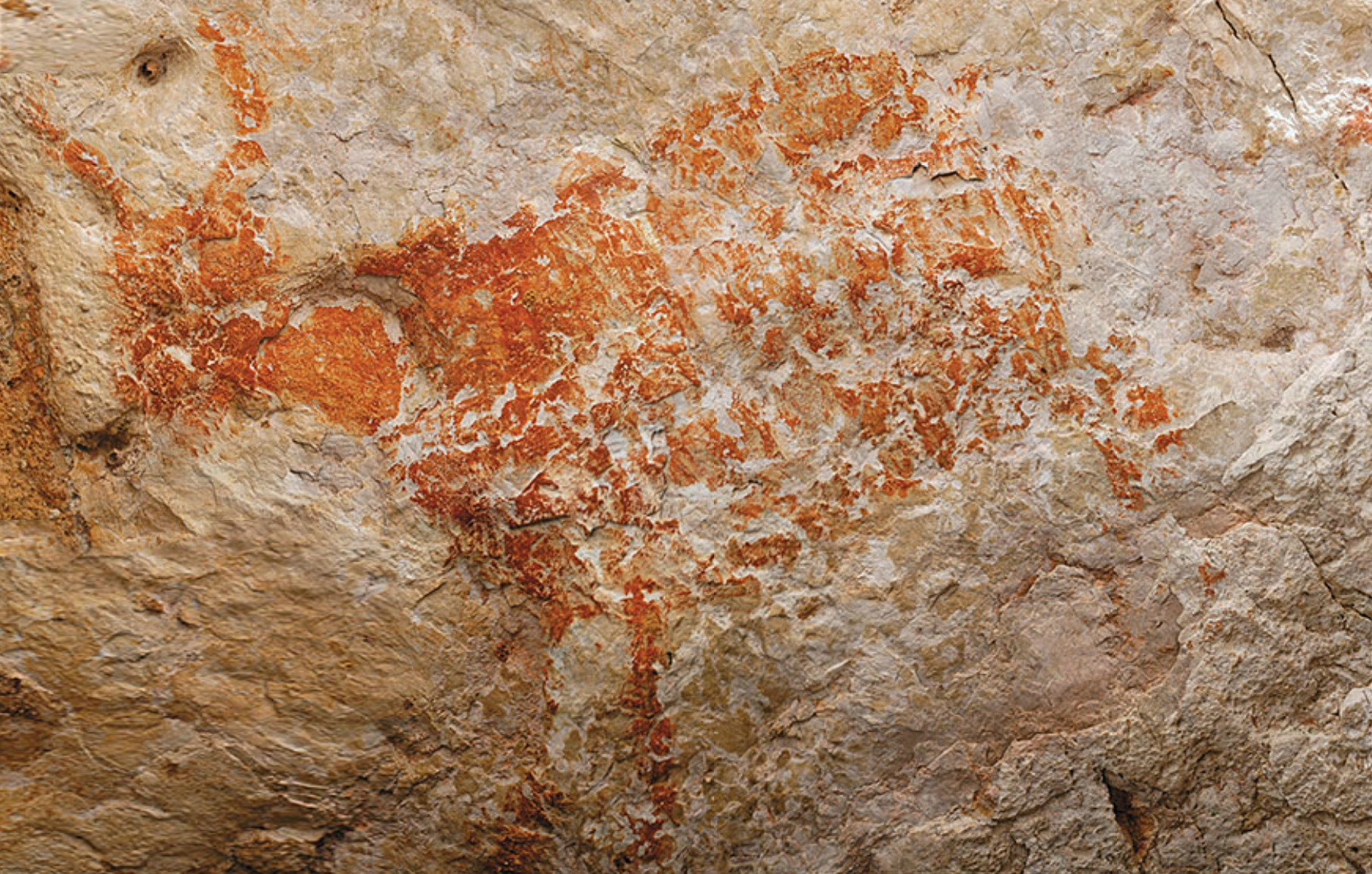
Lubang Jeriji Saléh cave, in Kalimantan, Indonesia, contains one of the oldest known figurative paintings, a 40,000-year-old depiction of a bull.

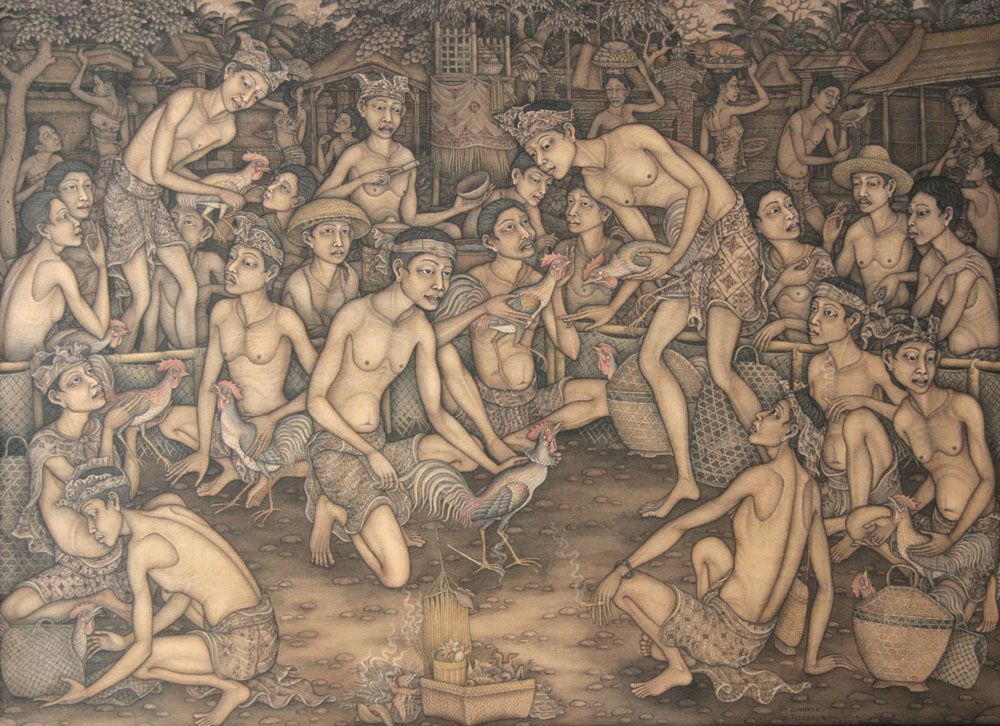
Traditional Balinese painting depicting cockfighting.

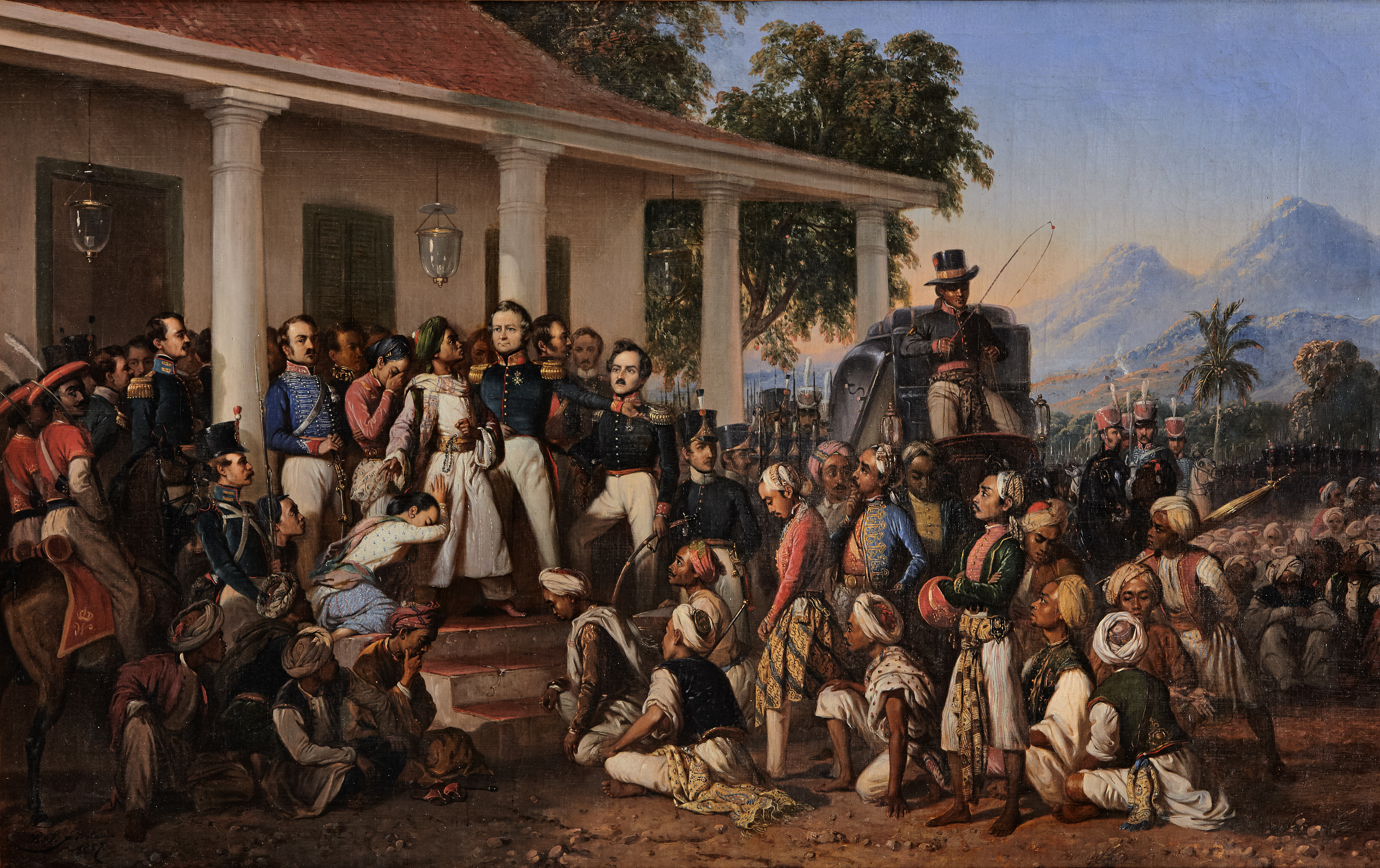
Capture of Prince Diponegoro, 1857.

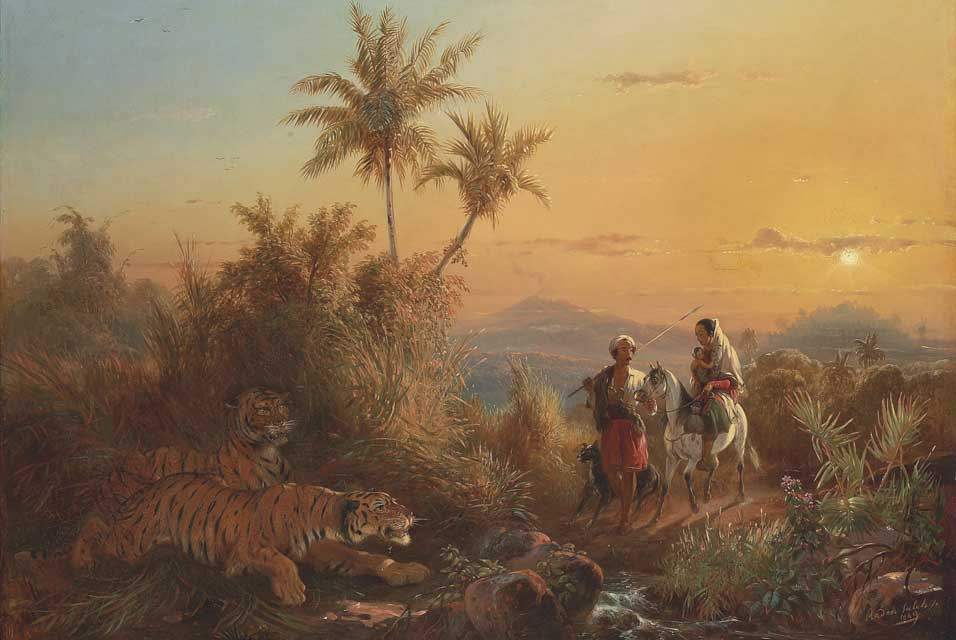
Javanese Landscape, with Tigers Listening to the Sound of a Travelling Group, 1849.

The Wheel of Life, I Ketut Murtika (b. 1952), Gouache on canvas

Pre-1920 Kamasan Palindon Painting detail, an example of Kamasan-style classical painting.

Mask Dancer (by A.A. Gde Anom Sukawati) in Puri Lukisan Museum.

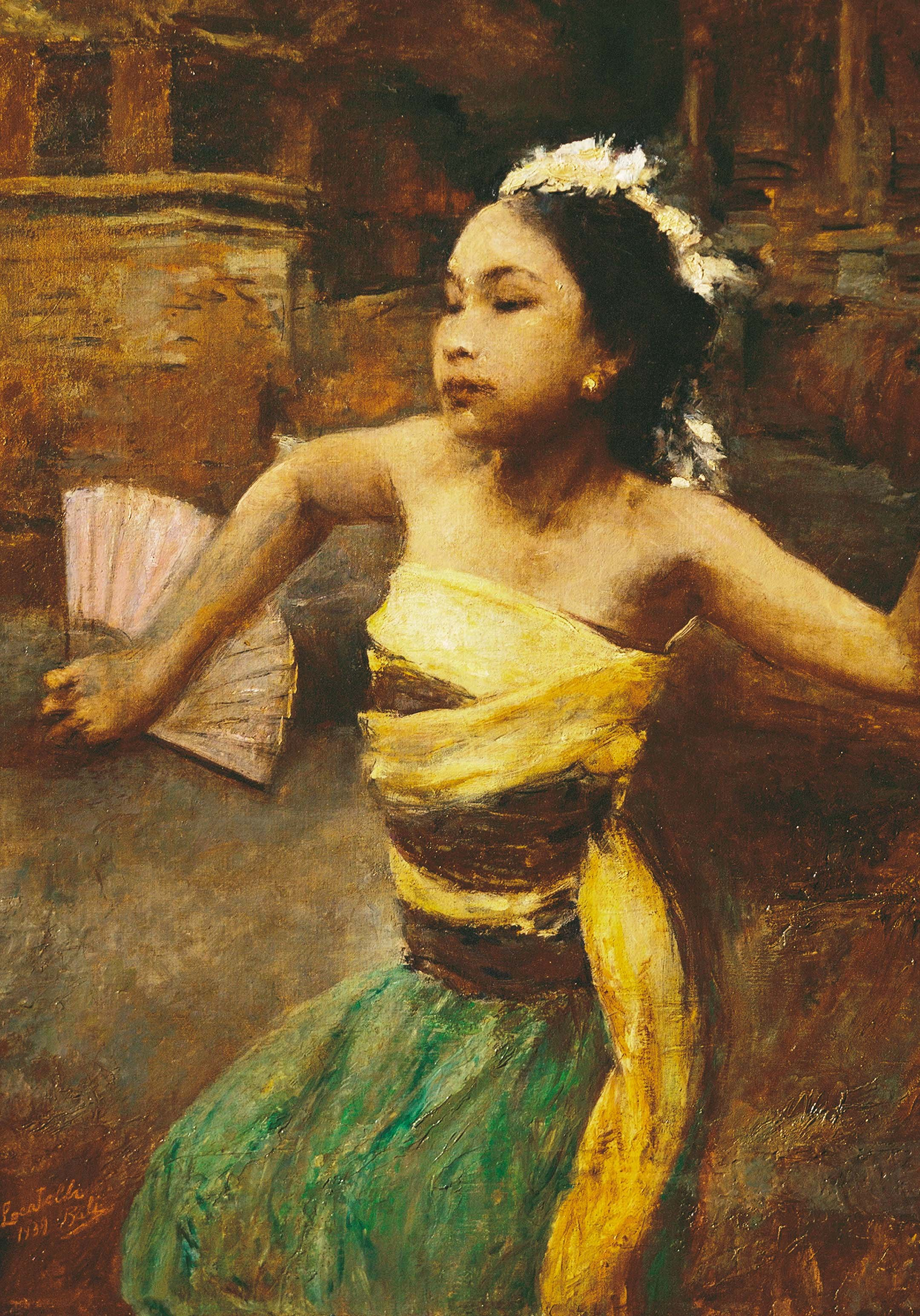
Legong dancer.

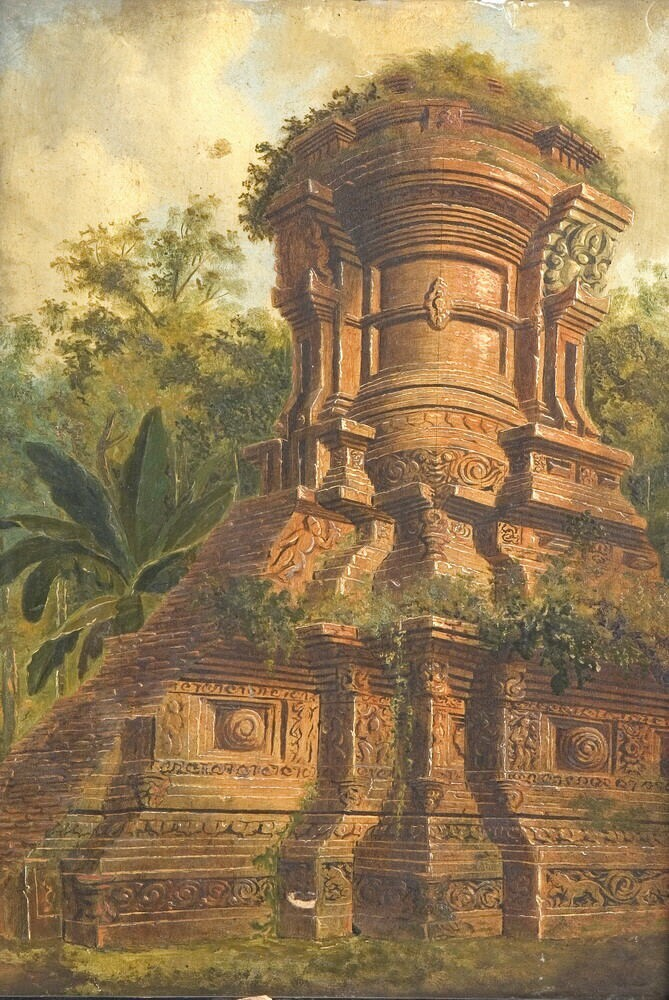
Indonesian Temple painting.

=== Filipino ===
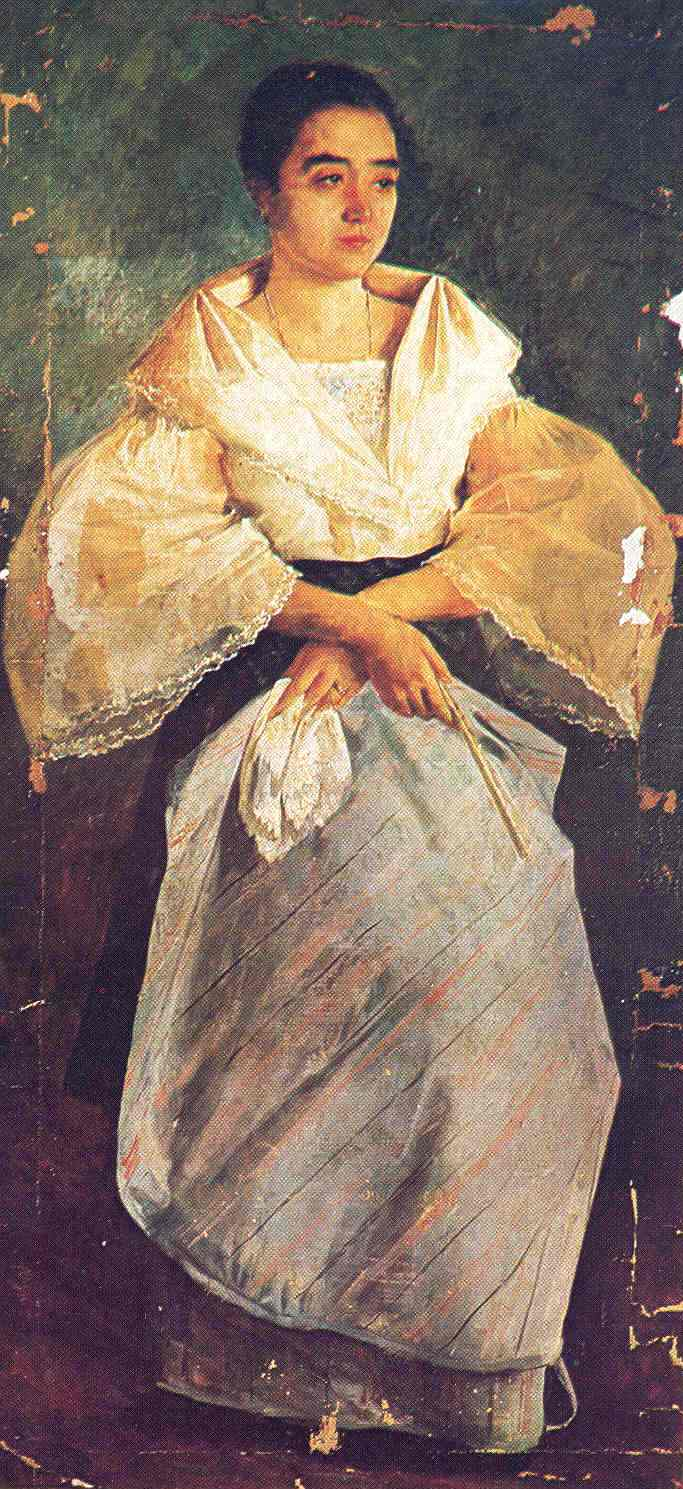
Juan Luna, La Bulaqueña, 1895

Filipino painting as a whole can be seen as an amalgamation of many cultural influences, though it tends to be more Western in its current form with Eastern roots.

Early Filipino painting can be found in red slip (clay mixed with water) designs embellished on the ritual pottery of the Philippines such as the Manunggul Jar. Evidence of Philippine pottery-making dated as early as 6000 BC has been found in Sanga-sanga Cave, Sulu and Laurente Cave, Cagayan. By 5000 BC the making of pottery was practiced throughout the country. Early Filipinos started making pottery before their Cambodian neighbors and at about the same time as the Thais as part of what appears to be a widespread Ice Age development of pottery technology. Further evidences of painting are manifested in the tattoo tradition of early Filipinos, in particular the Visayans, whom Spanish explorers referred to as Pintados or the 'Painted People'. They decorated their bodies in various colored pigmentations with designs referencing flora and fauna and heavenly bodies. Some of the most elaborate painting done by early Filipinos that survives to the present day is manifested among the arts and architecture of the Maranao who are well known for the Nāga Dragons and the Sarimanok carved and painted in the beautiful Panolong of their Torogan or King's House.

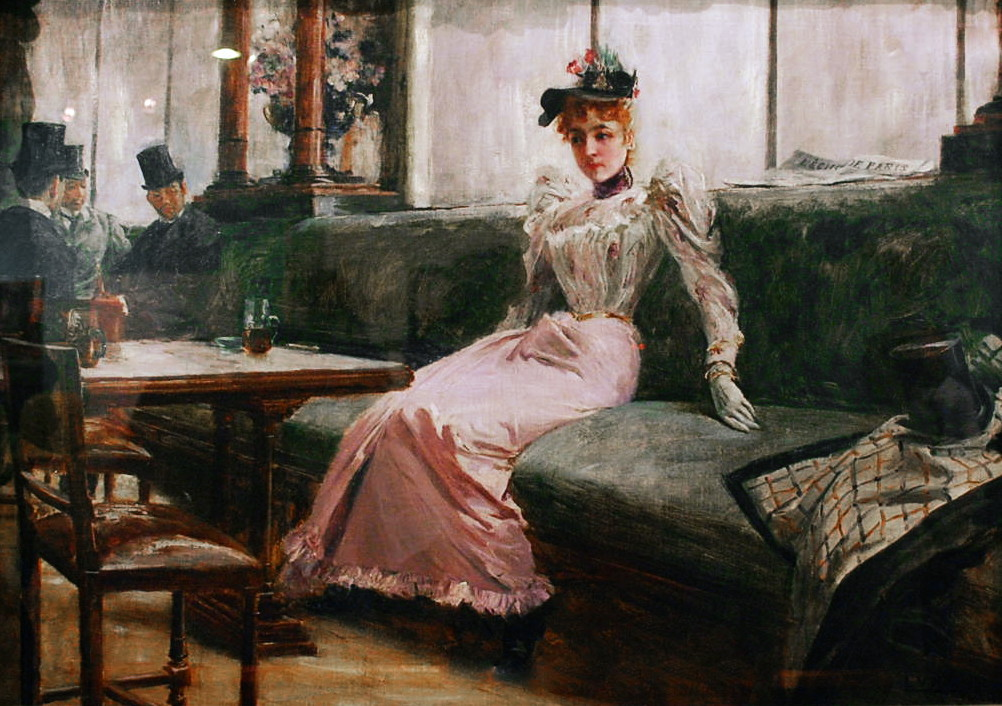
Juan Luna, The Parisian Life, 1892

Filipinos began creating paintings in the European tradition during the 17th-century Spanish period. The earliest of these paintings were Church frescoes and religious imagery from Biblical sources as well as engravings, sculptures and lithographs featuring Christian icons and European nobility. Most of the paintings and sculptures between the 19th and 20th century were a mixture of religious, political, and landscape artwork, with qualities of sweetness, dark, and light. Early modernist painters such as Damián Domingo were associated with religious and secular paintings. The art of Juan Luna and Félix Hidalgo showed a trend toward political statement. Artists such as Fernando Amorsolo used post-modernism to produce paintings that illustrated Philippine culture, nature, and harmony. Other artists such as Fernando Zóbel used reality and abstraction in their work.

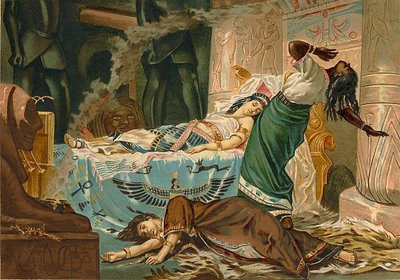
Juan Luna, The Death of Cleopatra, 1881

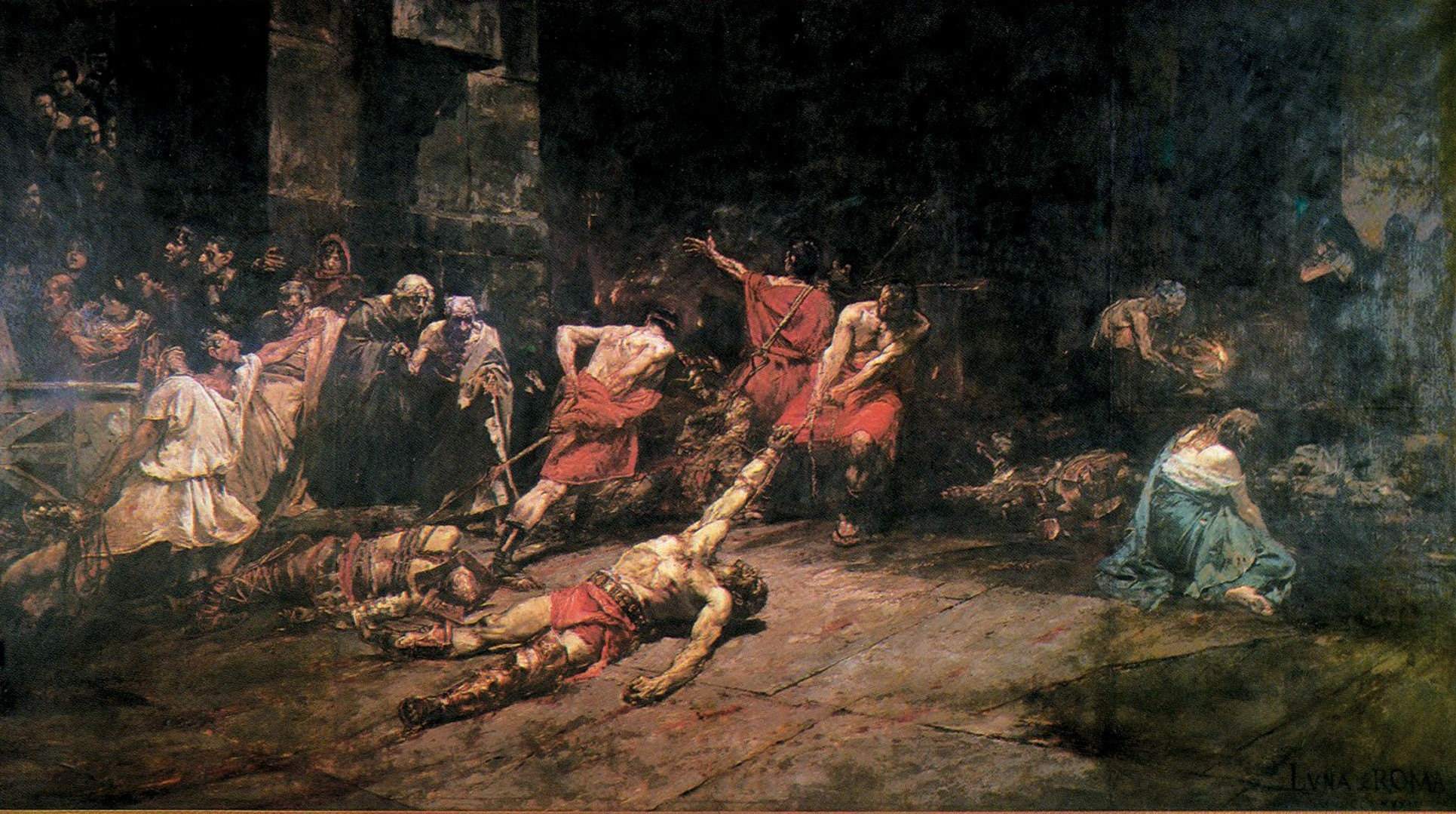
Juan Luna, Spoliarium, c. 1884

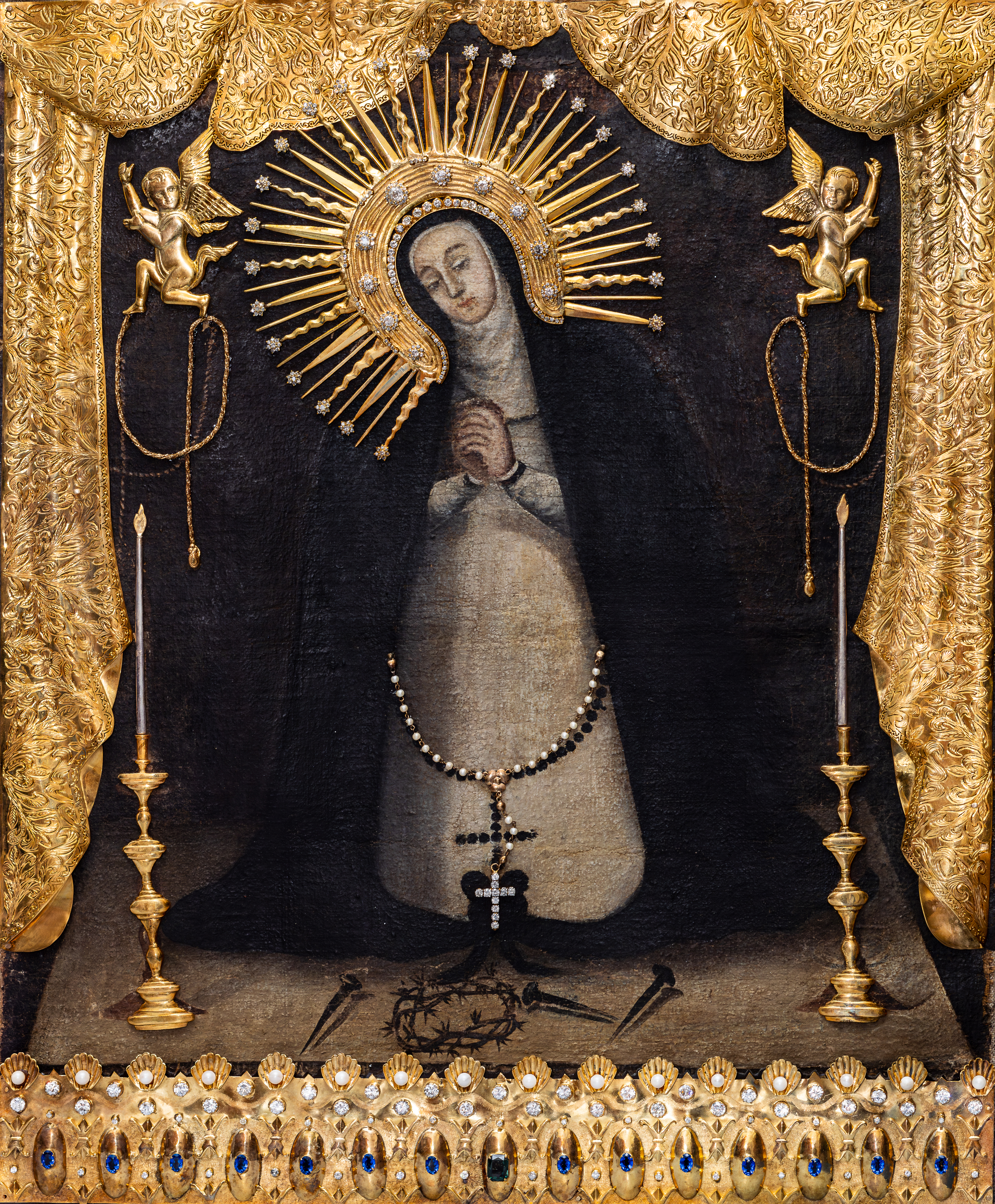
Nuestra Senora de la Soledad de Porta Vaga

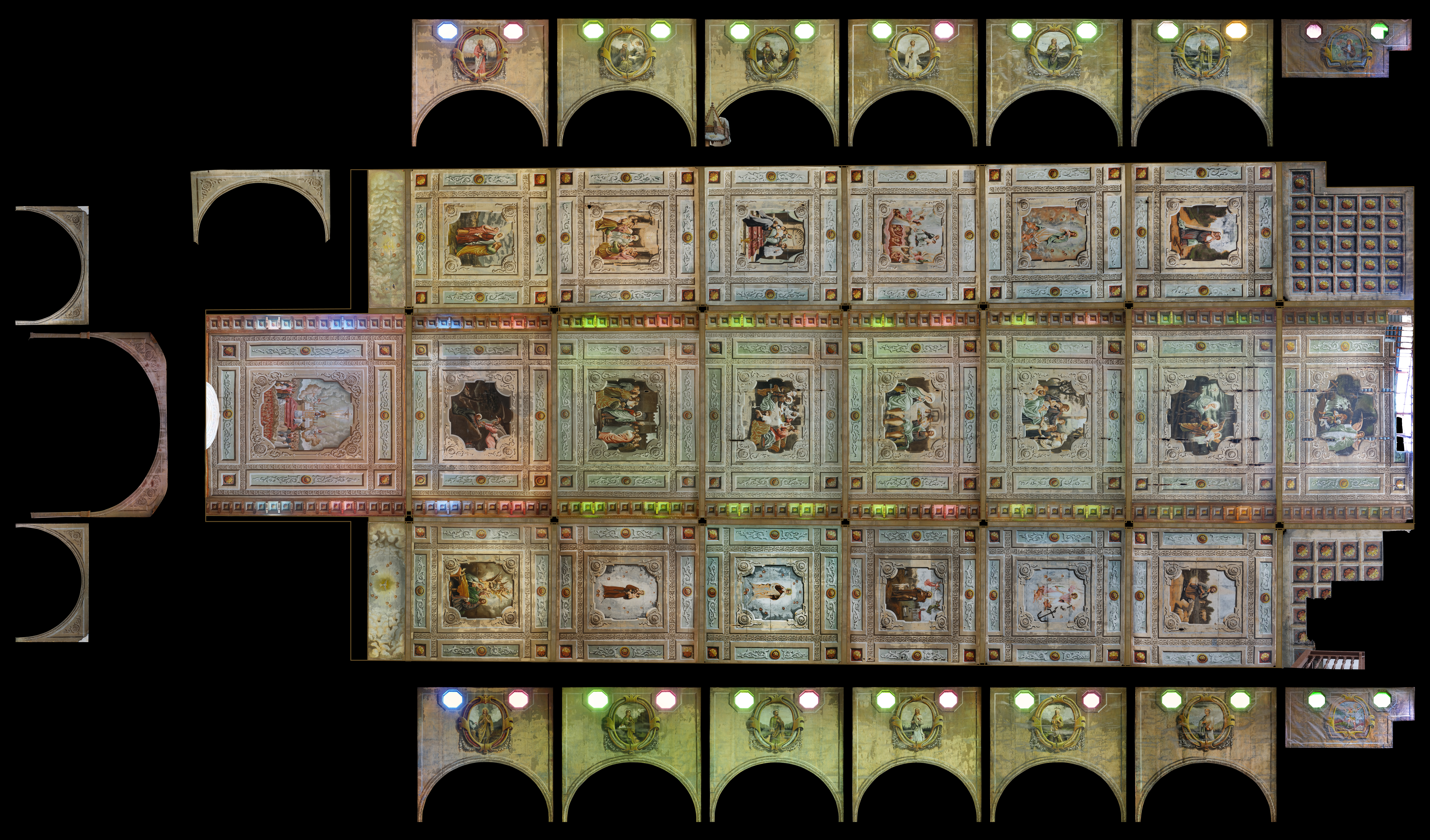
Lila Church ceiling painting

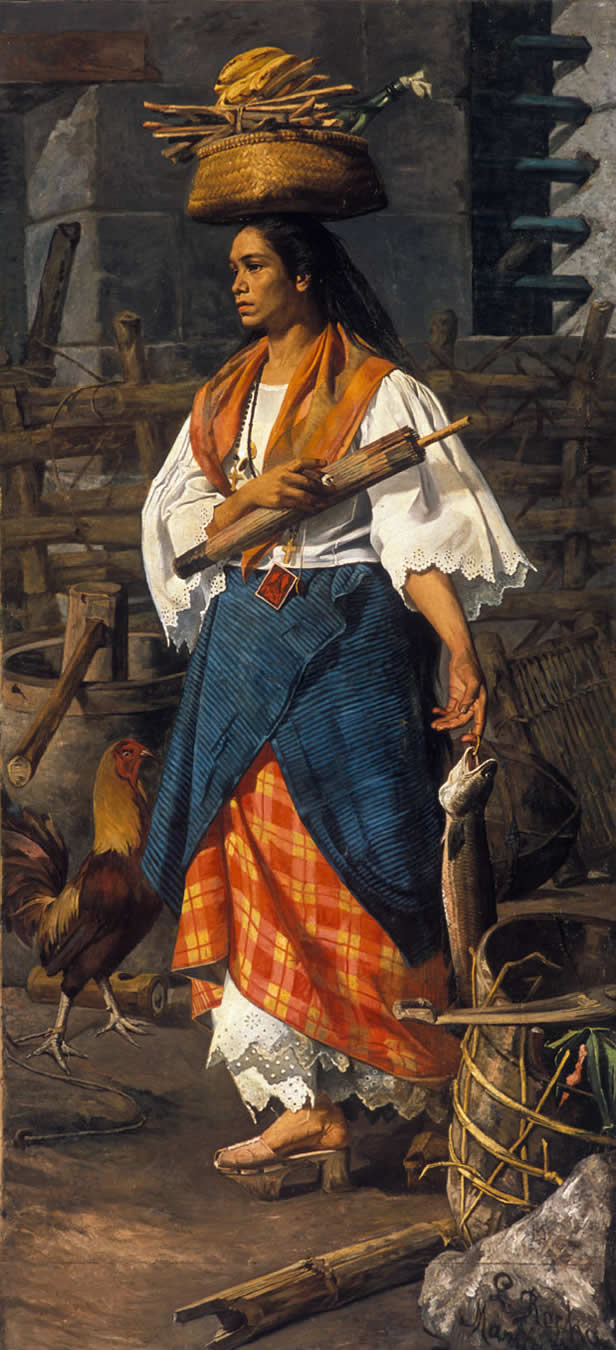
Lorenzo de la Rocha Icaza, Mujer filipina, 1895

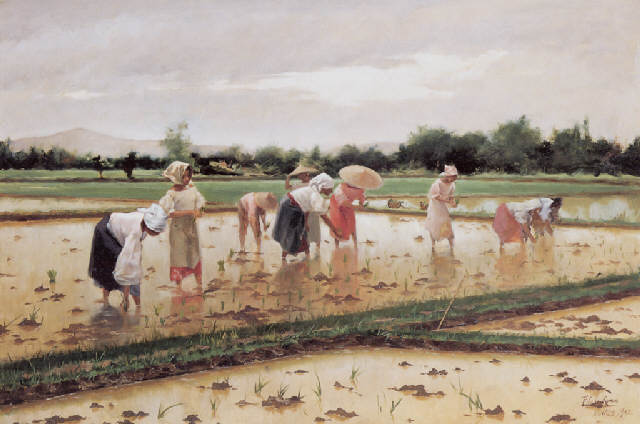
Fabián de la Rosa, Women Working in rice field, 1902

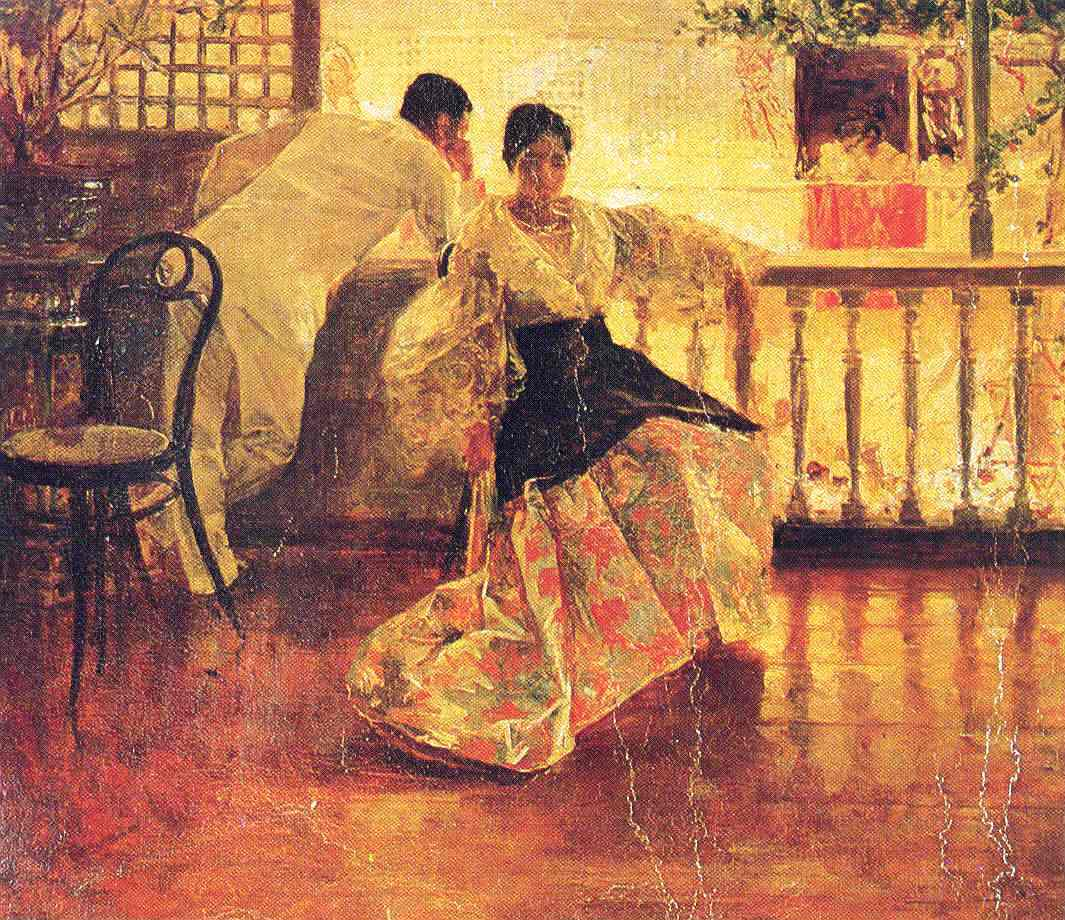
Juan Luna, Tampuhan, 1895

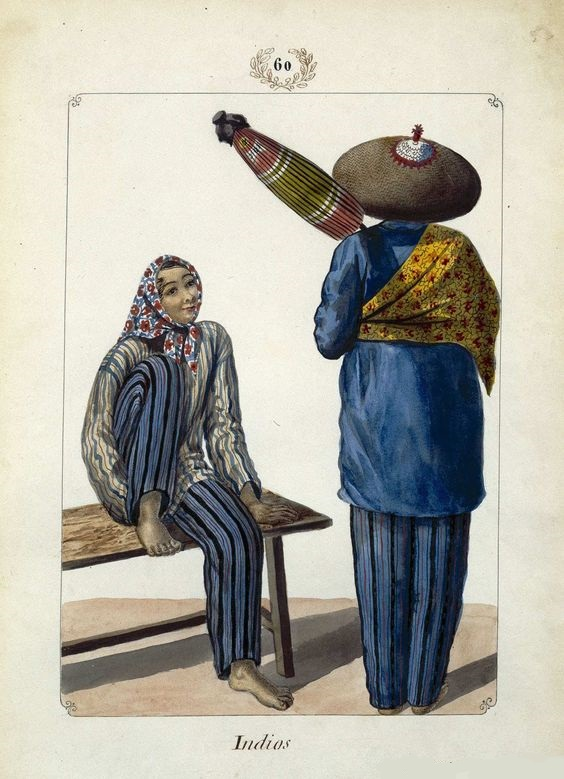
José Honorato Lozano, Indios, 1847
