= North Sangatta =

District of East Kutai Regency, East Kalimantan

North Sangatta Sangatta Utara
- District
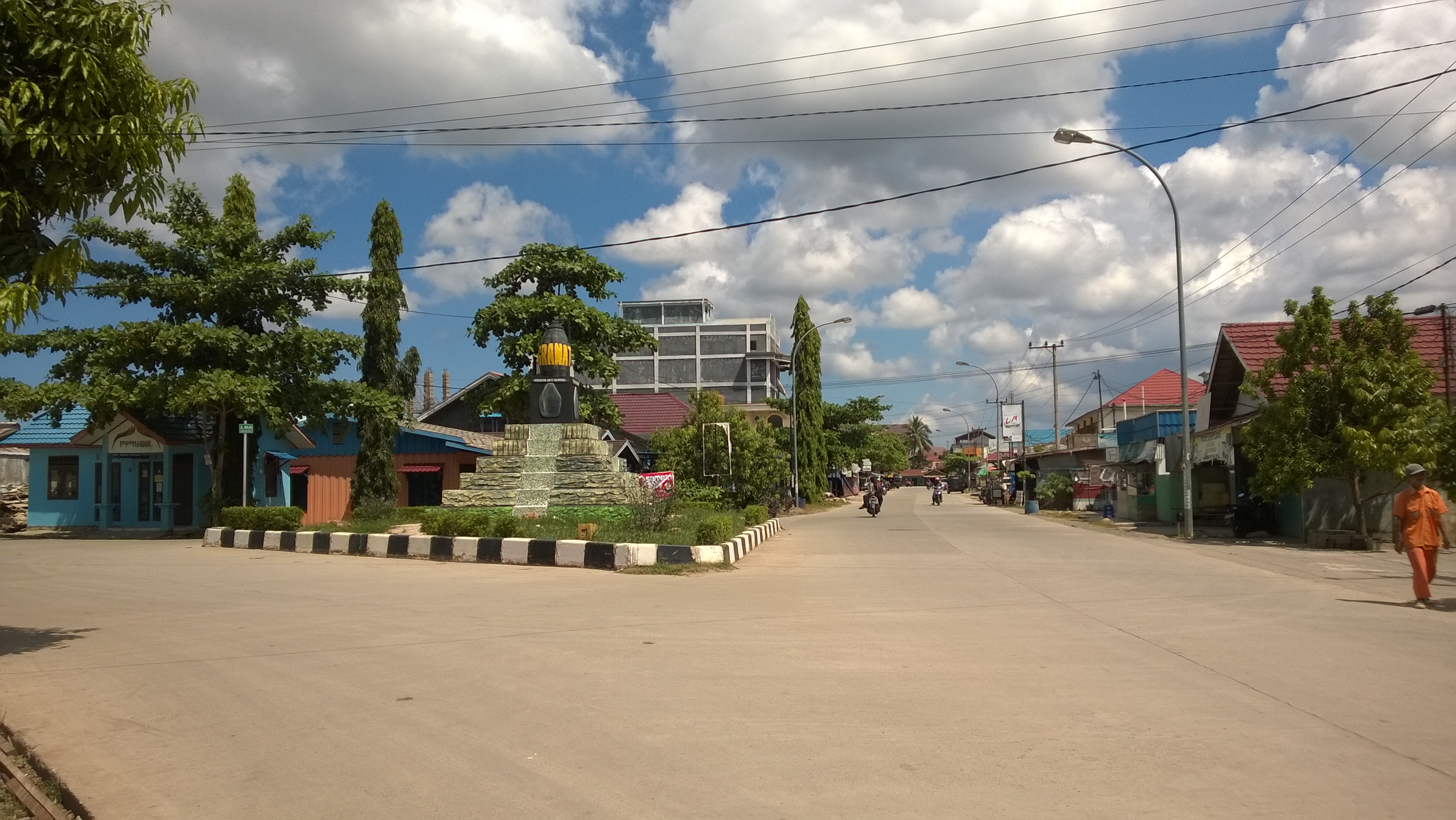
- Three-way intersection at North Sangatta
- Interactive map of North Sangatta
- Location in Kalimantan and Indonesia North Sangatta (Indonesia)
- Coordinates: 0°29′47.39370″N 117°32′9.56778″E
- Country: Indonesia
- Province: East Kalimantan
- Regency: East Kutai
- Established: 1 December 1989 (as Sangatta); 31 October 2005 (as North Sangatta)

Government
  - District head (Camat): Hasdiah

Area
  - Total: 333.56 km^{2} (128.79 sq mi)

Population (2024)
  - Total: 129,849
  - Density: 389.28/km^{2} (1,008.2/sq mi)
- Time zone: UTC+8 (ICT)
- Regional code: 64.08.04
- Villages: 4

North Sangatta (Indonesian: Sangatta Utara, Indonesian pronunciation: [saˈŋata uˈtara]) is an administrative district (kecamatan) of the East Kutai Regency, East Kalimantan, Indonesia. It covers a land area of 333.56 km^{2}, and had a population of 72,156 at the 2010 Census and 120,873 at the 2020 Census; as of mid 2024, it was inhabited by 129,849 people. Its district seat is located at the village of North Sangatta.

The district was established on 31 October 2005, after renaming the residual district of former Sangatta, but much of its urban areas are still within the contemporary district. North Sangatta shares borders with Bengalon to the north, Rantau Pulung to the west, and South Sangatta to the south.

== History ==
On 1 December 1989, Sangatta was separated from the former district of Bontang, following the latter's status was elevated into an administrative city (it originally included North Bontang and South Bontang). On 16 July 1999, just months prior the formation of East Kutai, Bengalon was separated from the district. On 31 October 2005, Rantau Pulung, South Sangatta, and Teluk Pandan were separated from Sangatta, and the residual lands were renamed into North Sangatta.

== Governance ==
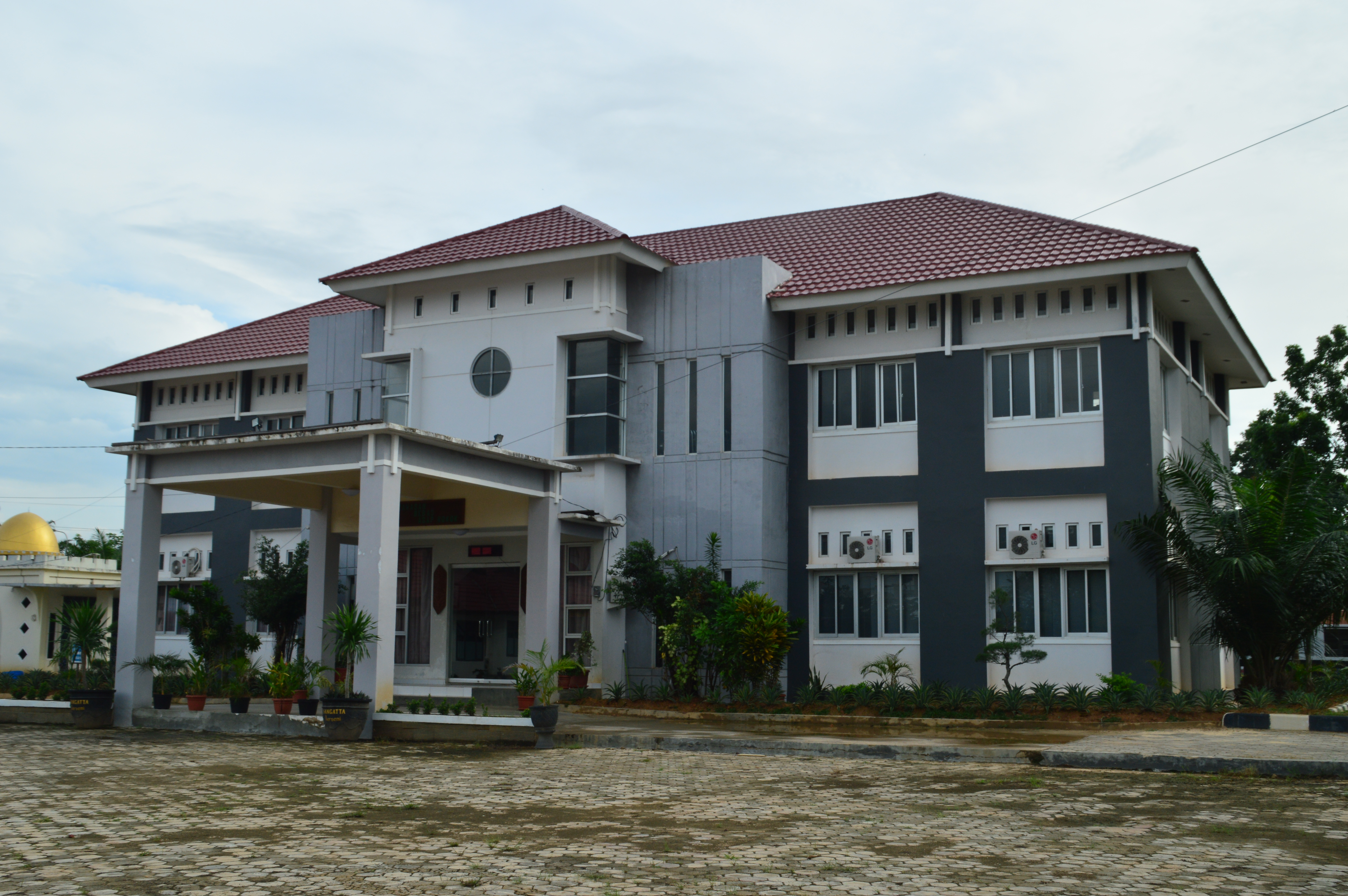
District head office at North Sangatta, North Sangatta.

=== Villages ===
North Sangatta District is divided into the urban community (kelurahan) of Lingga Bay (marked with grey background) and three nominally "rural" villages (desa):

Regional code (Kode wilayah)	Name	Area (km^{2})	Pop'n (2024)	Hamlets (dusun)	RW (rukun warga)	RT (rukun tetangga)
64.08.04.2001	Sangatta Utara (North Sangatta)	47.04	60,027	8		66
64.08.04.1010	Teluk Lingga (Lingga Bay)	31.62	29,999		8	56
64.08.04.2011	Singa Gembara	56.13	19,574	9		36
64.08.04.2012	Swarga Bara	198.29	20,249	10		56
	Totals	333.56	129,849	27	8	214

On 30 April 2024, three new villages (desa) were legally created from parts of the North Sangatta village, namely Sangatta Prima, Singa Karta, and Teluk Rawa. Their respective leaders were appointed on 12 August 2025.
