= Sidrap, East Kalimantan =

Disputed hamlet in East Kalimantan, Indonesia

Sidrap Kampung Sidrap
- Hamlet
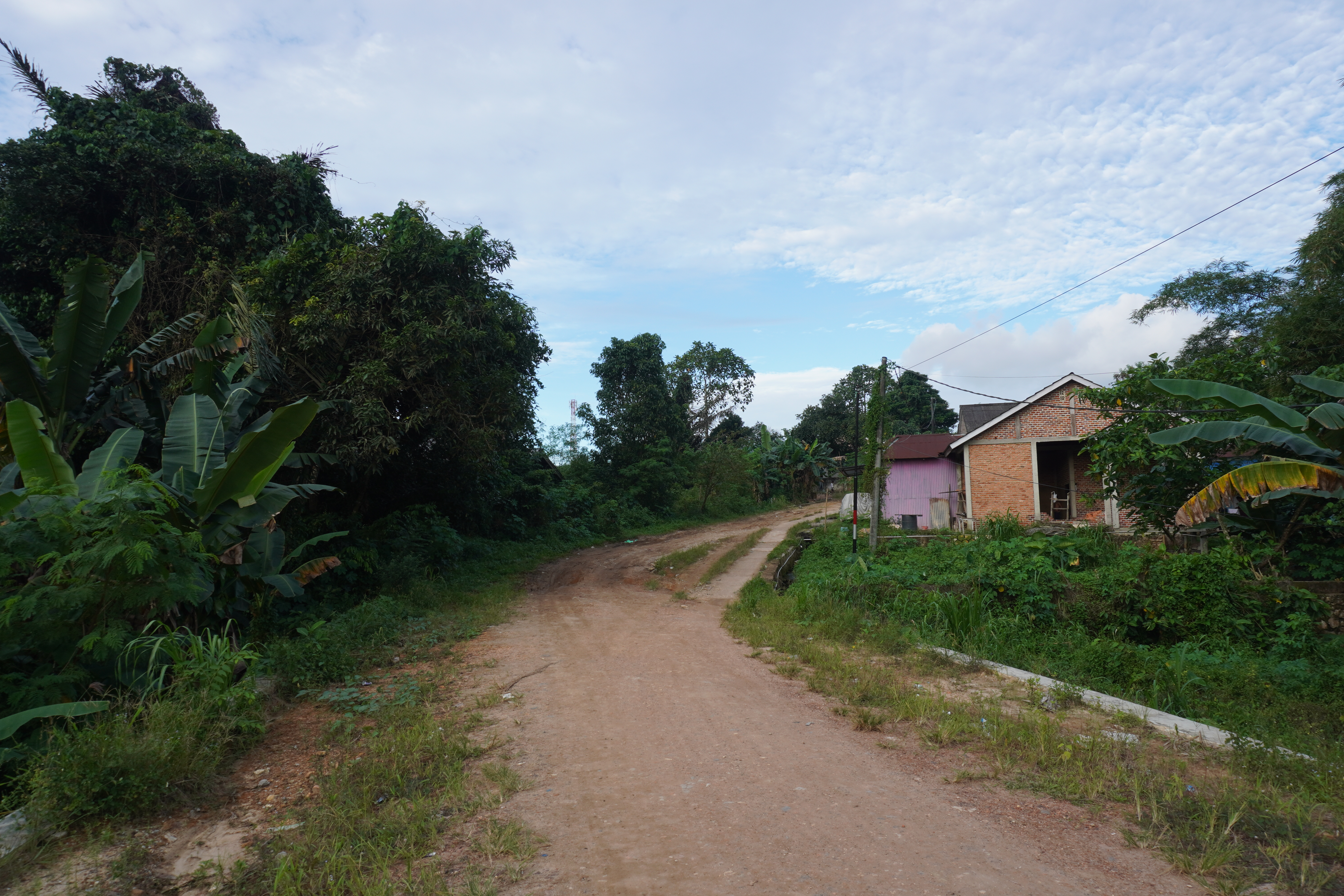
- A road that connects the hamlet of Sidrap with Bontang City.

- Location in East Kalimantan Sidrap (Kalimantan) Sidrap (Indonesia)
- Coordinates: 0.181126°N 117.467584°E
- Country: Indonesia
- Province: East Kalimantan
- Regency: East Kutai (disputed)
- District: Teluk Pandan
- Village: Martadinata

Population (2025)
  - Total: 3,195
- Time zone: UTC+8 (WITA)

Sidrap or Kampung Sidrap is a hamlet (dusun) in East Kalimantan, Indonesia, currently has an area of 164 hectares, and inhabited by around 3,195 people as of 2025. It has been subject into internal boundary dispute between Bontang city and East Kutai Regency local governments. According to the Ministry of Home Affairs Regulation (Permendagri) Number 25 of 2005, Sidrap belongs to the village of Martadinata, Teluk Pandan, East Kutai, despite being geographically closer to Bontang.

Most of its inhabitants have Bontang identity cards since 1999, and have depended on facilities built by the Bontang government. Meanwhile, since 2017, the East Kutai government has attempted to create new village of Mata Jaya, of which Sidrap will be included.

== History ==
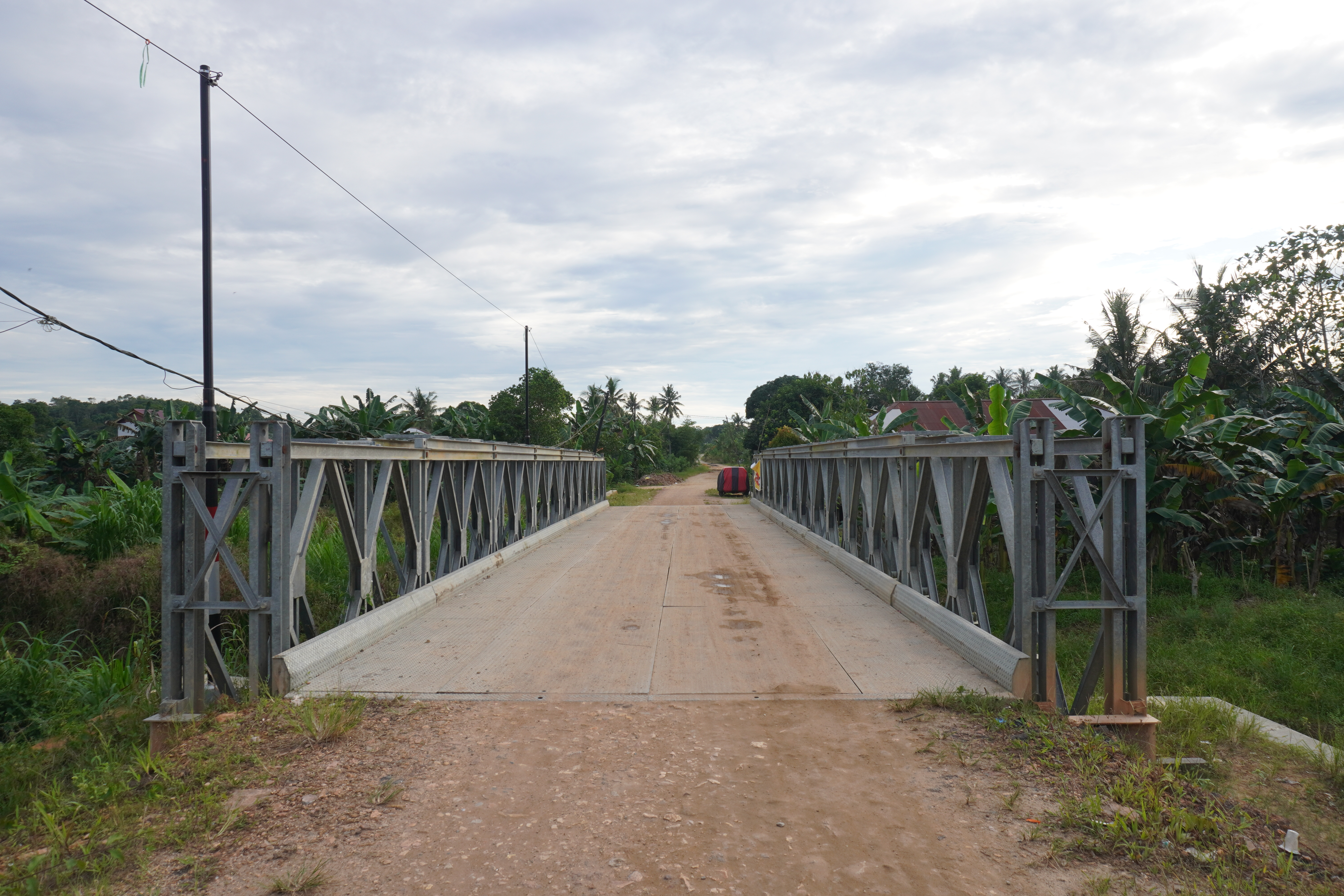
A bailey bridge at Sidrap

Long before the territorial dispute happened, Sidrap belonged entirely to the former district of Bontang before 1 December 1989, the date when it was upgraded into an administrative city, and the rest were separated. However, the controversy only began after the enactment of Law Number 47 of 1999, which allows the creation of East Kutai, Malinau, Nunukan, West Kutai regencies and Bontang city. On 17 June 2005, Ministry of Home Affairs Regulation Number 25 of 2005 was enacted in order to reconfirm the boundaries between Bontang, East Kutai, and Kutai Kartanegara. There were also preparations to form the village of Pulau Pinang that year, but this region was instead directed to join Bontang by the East Kutai Regional House of Representatives.

Previously, both the Bontang mayor Adi Darma and former East Kutai regent Isran Noor agreed to transfer Sidrap to Bontang. In January 2019, Isran, who later became the governor of East Kalimantan, mediated further negotiations between Bontang mayor Neni Moerniaeni and East Kutai regent Ismunandar, and both agreed to transfer Sidrap to Bontang. It was then announced that the respective regional boundary affirmation (PBD) teams would conduct field research at the region, no later than late January 2019.

On 17 September 2025, the Constitutional Court of Indonesia decided in favor of East Kutai, after rejecting Bontang's application on judicial review regarding the status of Sidrap.

== Reactions ==
=== Bontang government ===
In April 2018, speaker of Bontang Regional House of Representatives (DPRD), Nursalam, announced that they would negotiate with East Kutai government regarding Sidrap controversy, in response to Ismunandar's statement approving the entrance into Bontang.

In May 2025, when the Law Number 47 of 1999 was brought into judicial review at Constitutional Court of Indonesia, vice mayor of Bontang, Agus Haris, questioned about the East Kutai government's attention on the disputed hamlet.

=== East Kutai government ===
In January 2019, 6 village heads from Teluk Pandan signed on a letter against the release of Sidrap into Bontang.

According to the Head of Government Section of East Kutai Secretariat, Trisno, claimed in 2023 that the inclusion into Bontang territory would be unlikely. He viewed that the boundaries have been founded by Permendagri Number 25 of 2005, and his government has disagreed with the views of Bontang government.

=== Sidrap locals ===
Head of RT 22 of Sidrap, Suti Dusung, supported attempts by Bontang city government, quoting their dependence on facilities provided by Bontang and administration issues.
