= USS S-41 =

Submarine of the United States

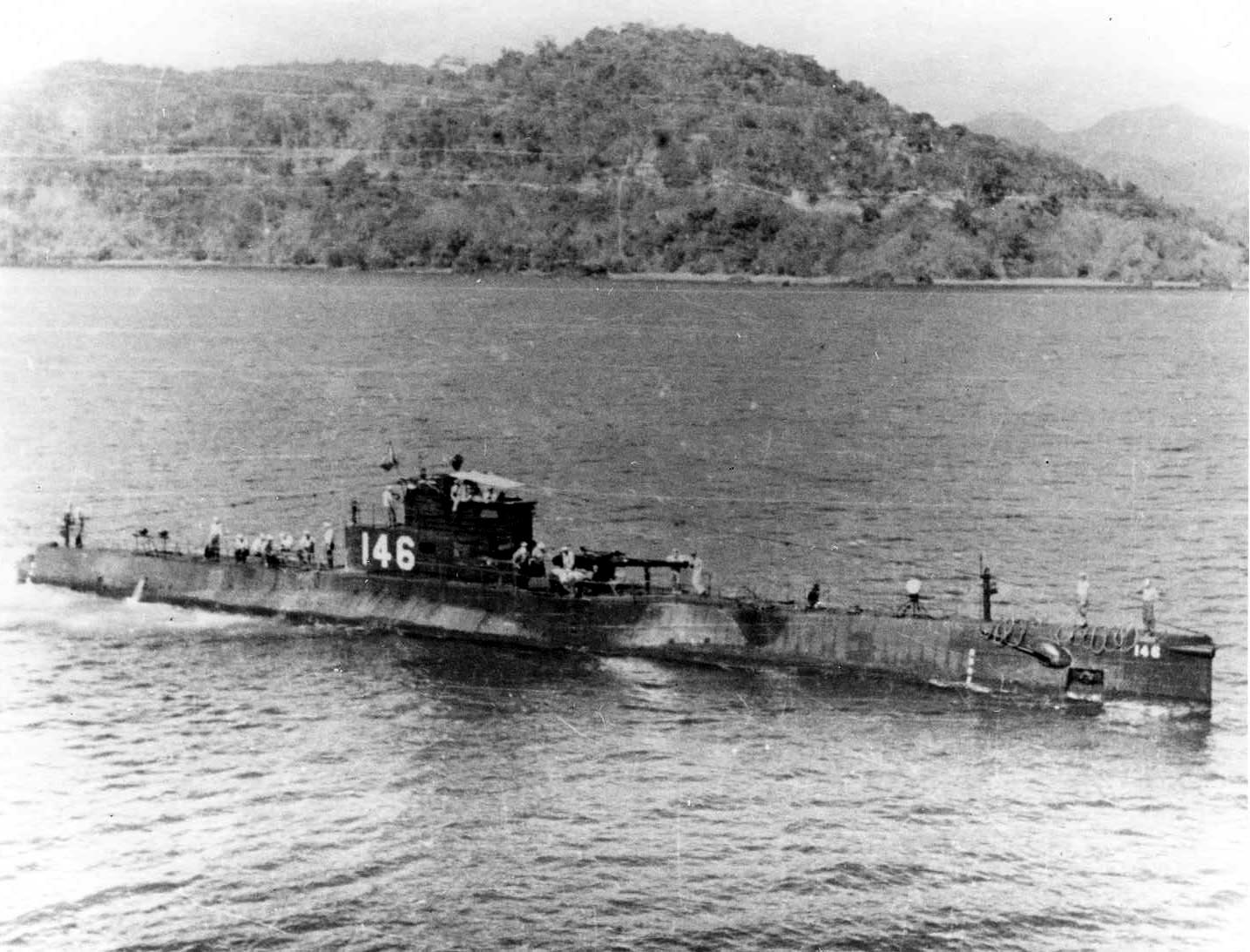
- USS S-41 in East Asia sometime between 1924 and 1941.

History

United States
- Name: USS S-41
- Builder: Bethlehem Shipbuilding Corporation, San Francisco, California
- Laid down: 17 April 1919
- Launched: 21 February 1921
- Sponsored by: Mrs. John F. Conners
- Commissioned: 15 January 1924
- Decommissioned: 13 February 1945
- Stricken: 25 February 1946
- Fate: Sold for scrap November 1946

General characteristics
- Class & type: S-class submarine
- Displacement: 854 long tons (868 t) surfaced; 1,062 long tons (1,079 t) submerged
- Length: 219 ft 3 in (66.83 m)
- Beam: 20 ft 8 in (6.30 m)
- Draft: 15 ft 11 in (4.85 m)
- Speed: 14.5 knots (16.7 mph; 26.9 km/h) surfaced; 11 knots (13 mph; 20 km/h) submerged
- Complement: 42 officers and men
- Armament: 1 × 4 in (102 mm)/50 deck gun; 4 × 21 inch (533 mm) torpedo tubes

Service record
- Operations: World War II
- Awards: 4 battle stars

USS S-41 (SS-146) was a first-group (S-1 or "Holland") S-class submarine of the United States Navy.

== Construction and commissioning ==
S-41′s keel was laid down on 17 April 1919 by the Bethlehem Shipbuilding Corporation in San Francisco, California. She was launched on 21 February 1921, sponsored by Mrs. John F. Conners, and commissioned on 15 January 1924.

== Service history ==
=== Asiatic fleet, 1924-1941 ===
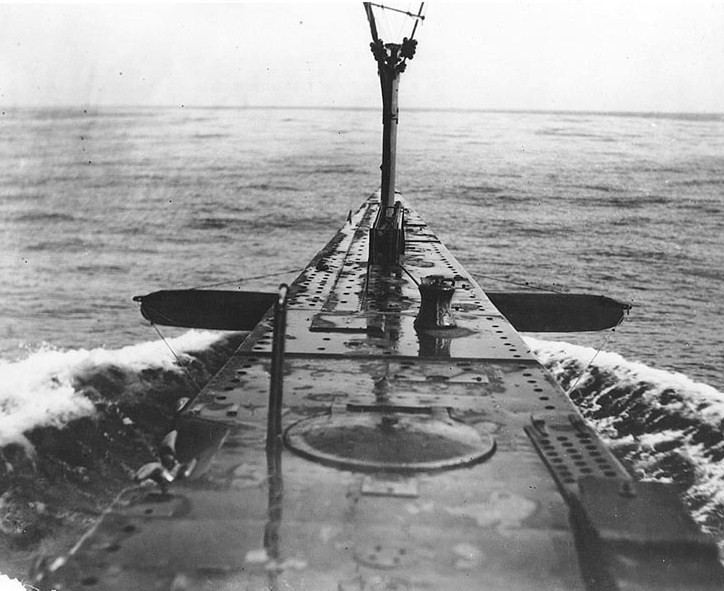
S-41 preparing to dive on 26 February 1924.

Through the summer of 1924, S-41 operated out of San Francisco, completing her trials and conducting exercises. On 17 September, she departed the West Coast with her division, Submarine Division 17, and headed for the Philippine Islands. Arriving at Manila on 5 November, she joined the Asiatic Fleet and, through the winter of 1925, engaged in exercises with surface and submarine units in Philippine waters. In May, she departed Manila for Tsingtao, whence she conducted operations, with her division, off the China coast into September. She then returned to the Philippines and resumed type exercises, patrols, and joint United States Army-United States Navy exercises in the Manila Bay-Subic Bay area.

For the next fifteen years, S-41’s schedule, and that of her division, remained basically the same; summer months were spent in Chinese waters, winters in the Philippines. The S-boats, primarily engaged in operations as a division during that period, occasionally interrupted their schedule and operated independently on special missions.

In January 1932, after Japanese forces attacked Shanghai, S-41 was ordered to assist in the evacuation of American nationals from the area.

As the decade progressed, Japanese actions in China became increasingly hostile, and S-boat schedules became more varied. Operations and patrols from China and the Philippines were extended to include, by the spring of 1938, the East Indies.

In 1940, S-41’s China deployment was shortened to two months. At the end of June, she returned to the Philippines, where she conducted familiarization cruises into 1941. That year was spent at Cavite and Olongapo for overhauls; in the South China Sea for fleet exercises; and in the waters off Luzon on patrol.

=== World War II ===
==== First war patrol, December 1941 ====
On 8 December 1941, S-41 was in Manila Bay. After hearing of Japan's attack on Pearl Harbor, she patrolled off Looc Bay, Tablas Island, in an attempt to impede the Japanese offensive. But the Japanese thrust continued.

==== Second war patrol, December 1941 ====
S-41 returned briefly to Manila for replenishment but departed again on 24 December. Into the new year, 1942, she patrolled off the Lingayen area. On 4 January she retired from Luzon and moved south toward the Netherlands East Indies. By 12 January, she was off Tarakan; by 15 January, Balikpapan; and by 25 January, after patrolling Makassar Strait, she was at Soerabaja. On 4 February, she departed that north Java base and returned to Makassar Strait. Thirteen days later, she torpedoed a Japanese transport off Cape Mangkalihat and was credited with a kill by the American-British-Dutch-Australian Command (ABDA).

On 10 March, she concluded her patrol at Fremantle, Western Australia. The Netherlands East Indies had fallen.

==== Third war patrol, May 1942 ====
Throughout the patrol, S-41’s gyrocompass had given continuous trouble, and her periscope had proven faulty. Repairs were made at Fremantle and at Brisbane, Queensland; and, on 9 May, she departed the latter port for the Solomon Islands. Encountering poor weather during the patrol, she operated in the Shortland Islands and Treasury Islands through the end of the month and returned to Brisbane on 6 June.

==== Fourth war patrol, July 1942 ====
On 22 July, she headed out of Moreton Bay, returned for emergency repairs; and, on 7 August, got underway for the New Britain-New Ireland area. She fired on several enemy ships, including a submarine with probable damage, and her patrol was noted for its "absence of serious material failures" — an achievement unique in boats of her class at that time.

Moving to the Guadalcanal area later in the patrol, S-41 was operating 5 nautical miles (9.3 km; 5.8 mi) from Savo Island when a ship moving at high speed — which her commanding officer identified as a possible cruiser — passed her in the predawn darkness of 24 August 1942 after she submerged and three depth charges exploded close enough to her to shatter light bulbs. On 25 August in the same general area, she observed a destroyer passing her and heard eight depth charges explode no closer than 400 yards (370 m) from her. As the night wore on, a destroyer began searching for her with active sonar, so she cleared the area. On the evening of 25 August. she received a message ordering her to return to her patrol station, a surprise to her commanding officer, who wondered how his superiors could have known she was off station. Her crew then discovered that S-41 had missed an earlier message ordering her to a new station, leading her commanding officer to wonder if S-41 had been the subject of friendly fire attacks by Allied ships who had not expected a U.S. submarine at S-41′s location on 24–25 August 1942.

==== Fifth war patrol and overhaul, September 1942 ====
At Brisbane from 2–21 September, she got underway for Hawaii on the latter date and, after patrolling in the Ellice Islands, arrived at Pearl Harbor on 13 October. On 29 October, she put into San Diego, California, and the next day began an extensive overhaul which lasted into April 1943. On 23 April of that month, she departed southern California for the Aleutian Islands.

==== Sixth war patrol, May 1943 ====
Arriving at Dutch Harbor on 11 May, S-41 departed four days later and took up patrol duties off Paramushiro in the Kuril Islands, on 21 May. On 27 May, she scored a probable kill on a four-masted fishing schooner; and, in the pre-dawn darkness of 31 May, she torpedoed a cargo ship in a night surface attack. From the violent internal explosion and fires which followed the initial torpedoing, the victim was presumed to have been carrying high explosives or light, volatile liquids.

==== Seventh and eighth war patrol, July 1943 ====
On 15 June, S-41 returned to Dutch Harbor. Thirteen days later, she got underway for Attu, whence she departed for the Kuril Islands on 3 July. Fog, heavy seas, sampans, fishing nets, and the erratic performance of torpedoes hindered her movements and impaired her hunting during that 33-day patrol and during her final patrol, again off Paramushiro, in late August and early September.

=== Retirement ===
With the onset of winter, S-41 was reassigned to training duty; and, after an overhaul, she commenced those operations out of Pearl Harbor. She returned to San Diego for inactivation in December 1944, and she was decommissioned on 13 February 1945. Her name was struck from the Naval Vessel Register on 25 February 1946; and, in November of that year, her hulk was sold, for scrapping, to the National Metal and Steel Corporation, Terminal Island, Los Angeles, California.

== Awards ==
- Yangtze Service Medal
- China Service Medal
- American Defense Service Medal
- Asiatic-Pacific Campaign Medal with four battle stars
- World War II Victory Medal
- Philippine Presidential Unit Citation
- Philippine Defense Medal with star
