= Teluk Pandan, East Kutai =

District of East Kutai Regency, East Kalimantan

Teluk Pandan
- District
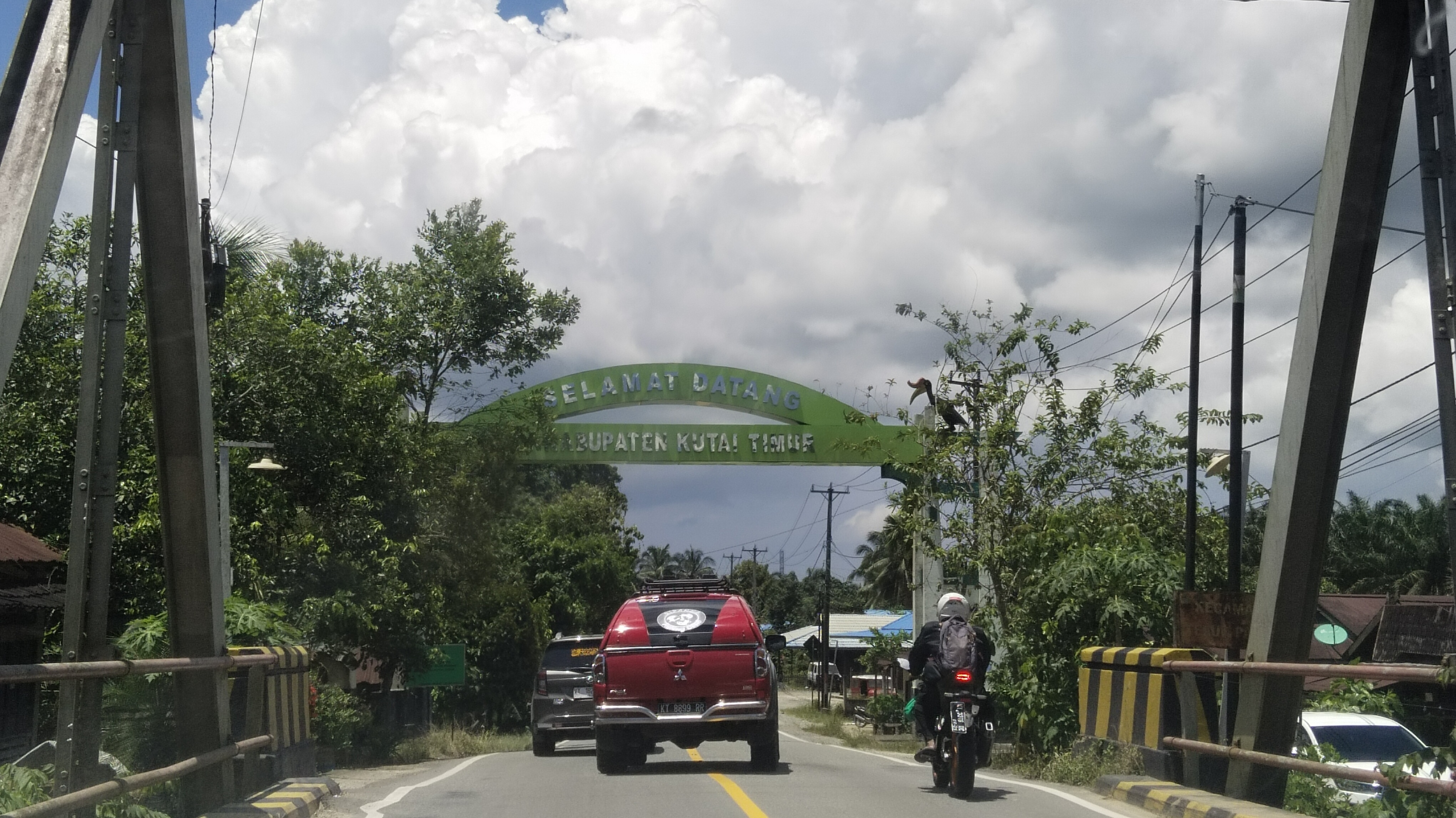
- Gate into East Kutai (from Marang Kayu)
- Interactive map of Teluk Pandan
- Location in Kalimantan and Indonesia Teluk Pandan (Indonesia)
- Coordinates: 0°13′48.93427″N 117°28′16.26989″E
- Country: Indonesia
- Province: East Kalimantan
- Regency: East Kutai
- Established: 31 October 2005
- District seat: Teluk Pandan

Government
  - District head (Camat): M. Anwar

Area
  - Total: 926.04 km^{2} (357.55 sq mi)

Population (mid 2025)
  - Total: 15,465
  - Density: 16.700/km^{2} (43.253/sq mi)
- Time zone: UTC+8 (ICT)
- Regional code: 64.08.13
- Villages: 6

Teluk Pandan (Indonesian pronunciation: [ˌt̪əlʊʔ ˈpandan], lit. 'Pandanus bay') is an administrative district (kecamatan) of the East Kutai Regency, East Kalimantan, Indonesia. It covers a land area of 926.04 km^{2}. As of mid 2025, it was inhabited by 15,465 people. Its district seat is located at the village of Teluk Pandan.

The district was formed on 31 October 2005 from the southern villages of the former district of Sangatta. Teluk Pandan District shares borders with the districts of South Sangatta to the north, Muara Kaman (Kutai Kartanegara) to the west, the Makassar Strait and the independent city of Bontang (which it almost surrounds on the landward side) to the east, and Marang Kayu (Kutai Kartanegara) to the south. Teluk Pandan was first inhabited by Buginese settlers in the 1950s, most prominently Daeng Mappile and other members of his family.

== History ==
On 7 March 1950, Daeng Mappile and other members of his family, including Daeng Mallongi, Daeng Masiga, Muh. Bakri and Muh. Seri, all of them were Buginese immigrants, left their hometown at Buareng, Bone after experiencing local insurgencies that led into feeling of unease. They sailed into Kalimantan for 45 days with a lambu boat, and Daeng Mappile's boat stranded at Bontang Kuala on 7 May 1950 when its food supplies ran out. Next day, he met the village chief of Bontang Kuala and was soon permitted to settle at Sekatup.

In 1955, Daeng Mappile and Muh. Seri were appointed by the Bontang Kuala government, as its village chief and secretary, respectively. One day, Daeng Mappile, Daeng Masiga, Muh. Bakri, and Muh. Seri agreed to cross the estuary at this region on a Monday. While they were resting for a lunch, they found numerous Pandanus (pandan) trees that grew along the estuary and eventually naming it as Teluk Pandan. On 7 July 1957, Daeng Mappile arrived at a ricefield owned by H. Nantang and machete was stuck on it to open its farming activity. A week later, the machete remained in its place, believed that the ghosts had allowed for its settlement.

Originally, the locals routinely moved to Teluk Pandan only for rice farming, and returned to Sekatup to involve in long-term farming activities, including coconut and mango farms. However, Sekatup began to be deserted by locals by the late 1970s, when Pupuk Kalimantan Timur entered business and soon acquired lands there (it has evolved into a housing area named Bukit Sekatup Damai). Teluk Pandan was still part of Bontang district, until 1 December 1989 when Bontang proper (consisting of the smaller area) was upgraded as an administrative city, while other areas (largely rural) either became the new district of Sangatta or went transferred to Muara Badak. Meanwhile, Teluk Pandan was carved out into 6 villages in the 1990s, which all of them became the basis for district's formation in 2005.

== Governance ==
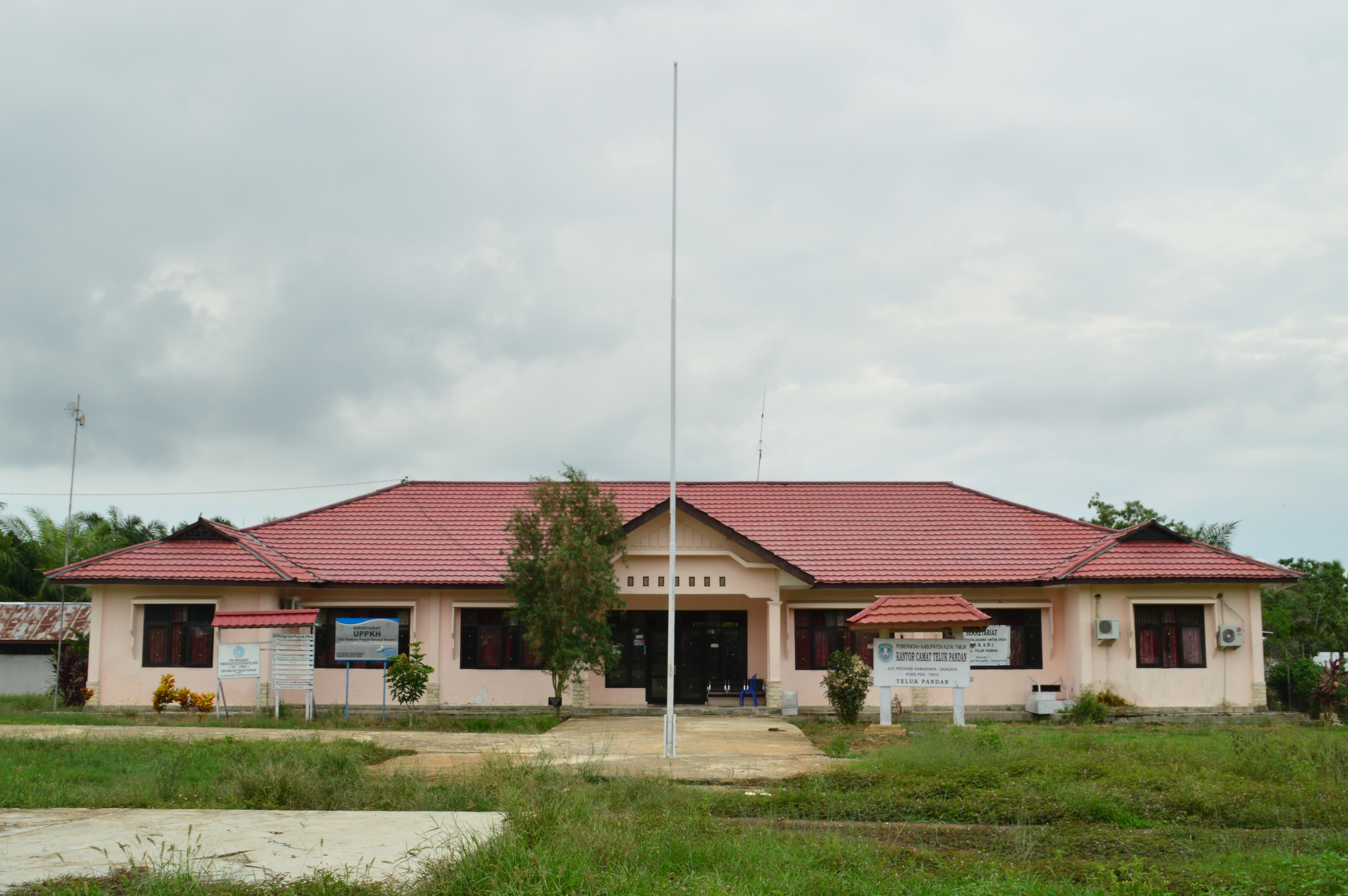
District head office at Teluk Pandan, Teluk Pandan.

=== Villages ===
Teluk Pandan District is divided into the following six villages (desa), and the district seat is marked bold:

Regional code (Kode wilayah)	Name	Area (km^{2})	Population (2024)	Hamlets (dusun)	RT (rukun tetangga)
64.08.13.2001	**Teluk Pandan**	299.67	3,667	9	18
64.08.13.2002	Suka Rahmat	118.20	3,657	6	20
64.08.13.2003	Suka Damai	185.63	1,772	3	9
64.08.13.2004	Kandolo	161.92	1,958	4	8
64.08.13.2005	Danau Redan	62.01	1,763	3	8
64.08.13.2006	Martadinata	126.25	2,178	8	20
	Totals	926.04	14,995	36	83

The status of Sidrap hamlet in the village of Martadinata is unclear, since they have been disputed by Bontang and East Kutai government.
