= Kaubun =

District of East Kutai Regency, Indonesia

- District
- Location Kaubun (Indonesia)
- Coordinates: 0°59′16″N 117°58′48″E
- Country: Indonesia
- Province: East Kalimantan
- Regency: East Kutai Regency

Area
  - Total: 578.44 km^{2} (223.34 sq mi)

Population (mid 2024)
  - Total: 17,893
  - Density: 30.933/km^{2} (80.117/sq mi)
- Time zone: UTC+8 (ICT)
- Villages: 8

Kaubun is an administrative district (kecamatan) of East Kutai Regency, in East Kalimantan Province of Indonesia. The district lies at the western end of the Mangkalihat Peninsula and includes the western bank of the Karangan River, which empties into Sangkulirang Bay on the east coast of Borneo (Kalimantan). It covers an area of 578.44 km^{2} and had a population of 9,622 at the 2010 Census and 14,867 at the 2020 Census, while the official estimate as at mid 2024 was 17,893. The district's seat is located in the town of Bumi Etam.

== Villages ==
Kaubun District is divided into the following eight villages (desa), listed below with their areas and their populations according to the mid-2023 official estimates.

Regional code (kode wilayah)	Name	Area (km^{2})	Population (2023)	Hamlets (dusun)	RT (rukun tetangga)
64.08.15.2001	Bumi Etam	58.60	4,932	3	15
64.08.15.2002	Bumi Rapak	176.28	2,415		14
64.08.15.2003	Bumi Jaya	62.55	1,819	3	8
64.08.15.2004	Cipta Graha	192.89	1,757	3	10
64.08.15.2005	Kadungan Jaya	76.01	1,216	3	12
64.08.15.2006	Pengadan Baru	70.58	1,745	4	14
64.08.15.2007	Mata Air	25.63	876	2	12
64.08.15.2008	Bukit Permata	102.43	1,810	5	16
