= Sangkulirang =

District of East Kutai Regency, Indonesia

- District
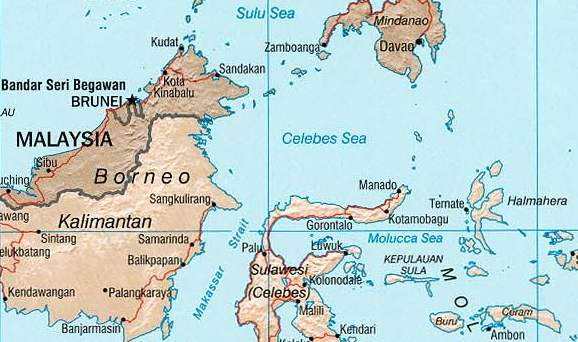

- Location Sangkulirang (Indonesia)
- Coordinates: 0°59′16″N 117°58′48″E
- Country: Indonesia
- Province: East Kalimantan
- Regency: East Kutai Regency

Government
  - Camat: Hormansyah

Area
  - Total: 1,559.29 km^{2} (602.05 sq mi)

Population (mid 2025)
  - Total: 26,131
  - Density: 16.758/km^{2} (43.404/sq mi)
- Time zone: UTC+8 (ICT)
- Villages: 15

Sangkulirang is an administrative district (kecamatan) of East Kutai Regency, in East Kalimantan Province of Indonesia. The district lies in the northern part of the Makassar Strait and at the southern part of the Mangkalihat Peninsula. Sangkulirang includes the delta of the Karangan River, which forms the Sangkulirang Bay on the east coast of Borneo (Kalimantan). Most of the district is vegetated with mangrove forest and has some notable karst areas with steep limestone cliffs. It covers an area of 1,559.29 km^{2} and had a population of 16,181 at the 2010 Census and 26,449 at the 2020 Census, while the official estimate as at mid 2025 was 26,131. The district's seat is located in the town of Benua Baru Ilir on the west side of the Karangan River, at the point where it opens out into Sankulirang Bay.

Under consideration is a proposal to separate off the five districts in the northeast corner of East Kutai Regency to create a new Sangkulirang Regency (Indonesian: Kabupaten Sangkulirang) with its proposed capital at the town of Sangkulirang (Benua Baru Ilir District).

== Villages ==
Sangkulirang District is divided into the following fifteen villages (desa), listed below with their areas and their populations at the 2020 Census and according to the mid-2024 official estimates.

Regional code	Name	Area (km^{2})	Pop'n (2020)	Pop'n (2024)	Hamlets (dusun)	RW (rukun warga)
64.08.05.2001	Kerayaan	216.35	3,222	3,045	2	10
64.08.05.2006	Benua Baru Ilir	46.47	5,322	5,840	5	26
64.08.05.2011	Sempayau	82.82	1,742	1,494	2	6
64.08.05.2013	Tepian Terap	342.48	1,366	1,620	1	4
64.08.05.2012	Pelawan	117.42	2,426	1,921	2	7
64.08.05.2005	Mandu Dalam	306.23	1,311	965	2	6
64.08.05.2004	Saka	125.73	708	728	2	5
64.08.05.2003	Peridan	55.35	2,419	1,605	3	10
64.08.05.2002	Tanjung Manis	7.92	862	674	2	4
64.08.05.2015	Maloy	59.76	1,082	1,339	2	6
64.08.05.2016	Benua Baru Ulu	20.27	2,715	2,800	3	14
64.08.05.2017	Kolek	67.56	594	561	1	3
64.08.05.2018	Pulau Miang	26.51	814	807	1	3
64.08.05.2019	Perupuk	56.57	1,116	859	2	6
64.08.05.2020	Mandu Pantai; Sejahtera	27.85	750	902	2	5
	Totals	1,559.29	26,449	25,160	32	115
