= South Sangatta =

District of East Kutai Regency, East Kalimantan

South Sangatta Sangatta Selatan
- District
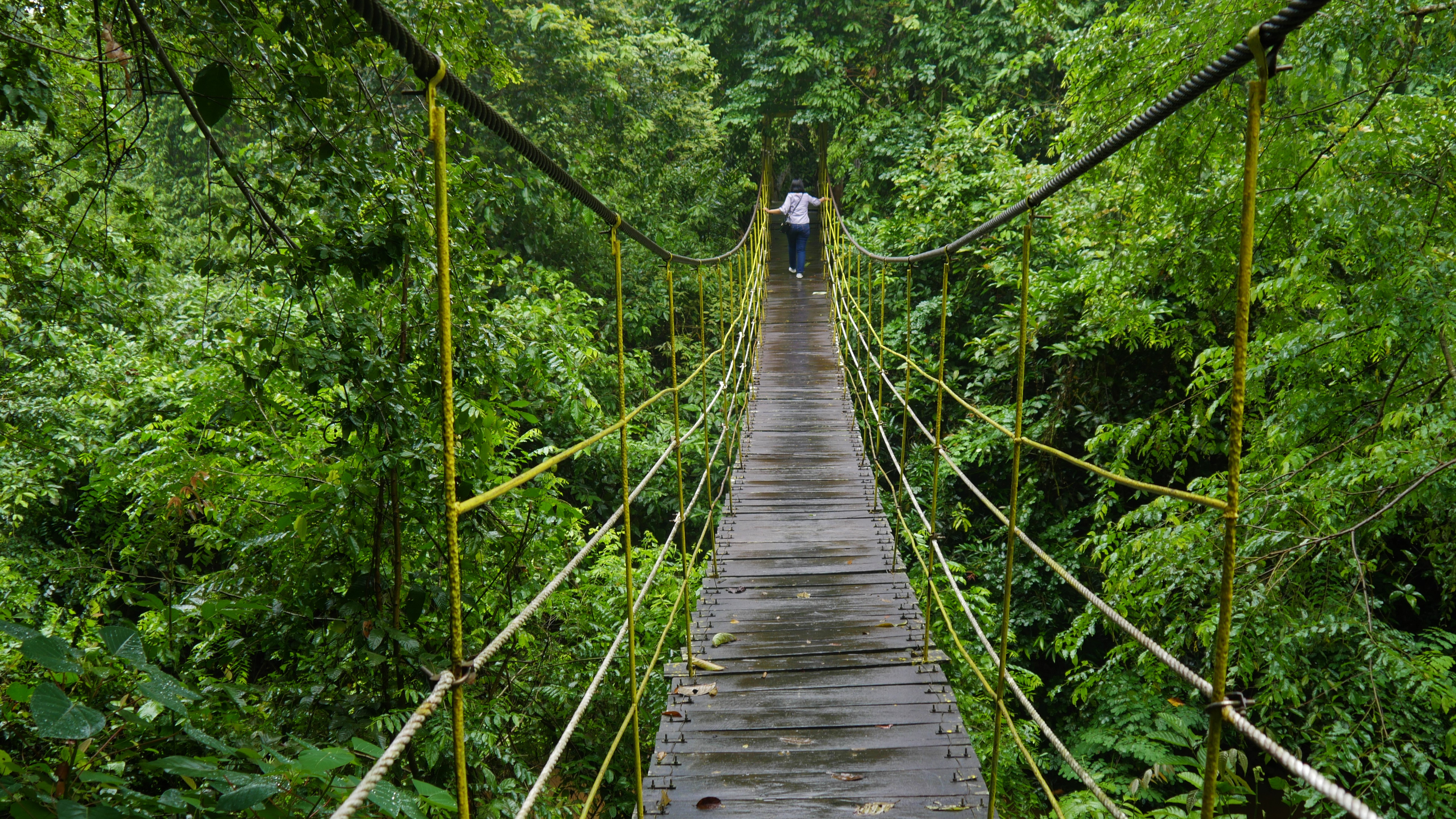
- Suspension bridge at Sangkima Jungle Park (Kutai National Park)
- Interactive map of South Sangatta
- Location in Kalimantan and Indonesia South Sangatta (Indonesia)
- Coordinates: 0°27′14.60174″N 117°32′46.79174″E
- Country: Indonesia
- Province: East Kalimantan
- Regency: East Kutai
- Established: 31 October 2005
- District seat: Singa Geweh

Government
  - District head (Camat): Abbas

Area
  - Total: 1,201.26 km^{2} (463.81 sq mi)

Population (2024)
  - Total: 32,133
  - Density: 26.749/km^{2} (69.281/sq mi)
- Time zone: UTC+8 (ICT)
- Regional code: 64.08.12
- Villages: 4

South Sangatta (Indonesian: Sangatta Selatan, Indonesian pronunciation: [saˈŋata səˈlatan]) is a district of the East Kutai Regency, East Kalimantan, Indonesia. As of mid 2024, it was inhabited by 32,133 people (comprising 17,099 males and 15,034 females), and currently has a total area of 1,225 km^{2}. Its district seat is located at the village of Singa Geweh.

The district was created on 31 October 2005 by the division of the former district of Sangatta. South Sangatta shares borders with North Sangatta and Rantau Pulung to the north, Muara Kaman (Kutai Kartanegara) to the west, and Teluk Pandan to the south.

== Governance ==
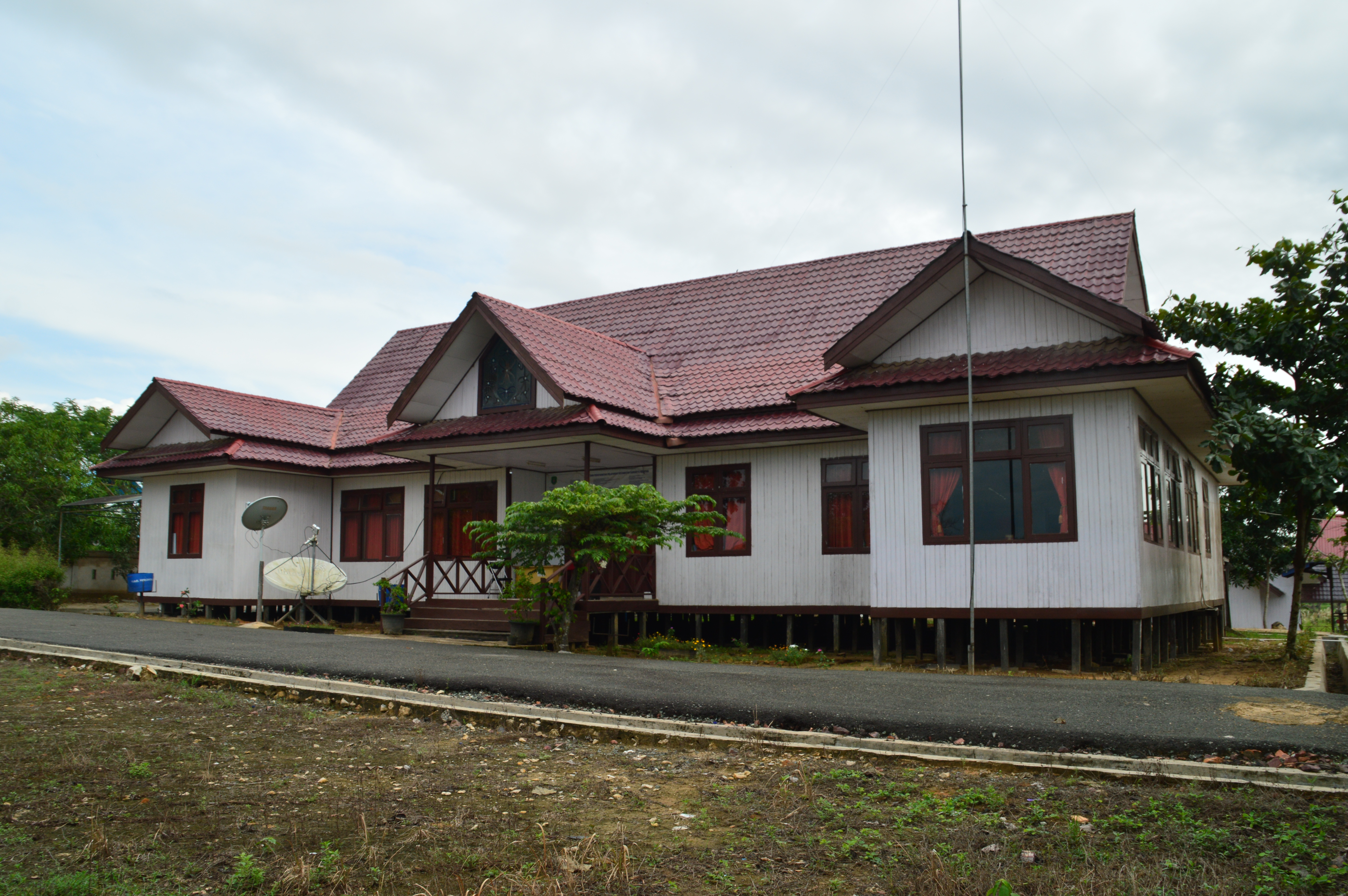
District head office at Singa Geweh, North Sangatta.

=== Villages ===
South Sangatta is divided into the urban kelurahan of Singa Geweh (marked with grey background) and 3 rural villages (desa):

Regional code (Kode wilayah)	Village	Area (km^{2})	Pop'n (mid 2024)	Hamlets (dusun)	RW (rukun warga)	RT (rukun tetangga)
64.08.12.2001	South Sangatta (Sangatta Selatan)	581.94	18,879	12		46
64.08.12.1002	Singa Geweh	46.27	8,312		7	35
64.08.12.2003	Sangkima	379.19	3,387	9		26
64.08.12.2004	Teluk Singkama (Singkama Bay)	233.73	1,555	6		20
	Totals	1,201.26	32,133	27	7	127
