= Sangkulirang-Mangkalihat Karst =

Karst area in Indonesia

Coordinates: 0.133665°S 116.608165°E

- Sangkulirang-Mangkalihat Geopark
- Location within Indonesia
- Location: East Kutai Regency and Berau Regency, East Kalimantan, Indonesia
- Nearest city: Samarinda
- Area: 105,000 hectares (1,050 km^{2})

The Sangkulirang-Mangkalihat Karst is a karstique area in Sub Kelay, Biatan, Talisayan, Batu Putih, and Biduk-biduk Berau districts of East Kalimantan province on the island of Borneo in Indonesia. It covers an area of 105,000 hectares, including the Mangkalihat Peninsula.

In May 2015, it has been nominated for inclusion in the UNESCO World Heritage Site list. The cave paintings within the caves in the Sangkulirang-Mangkalihat karsts was suggested to be a Geopark in April 2017. The paintings were researched extensively by Indonesia's Heritage Preservation Hall (BPCB) for its preservation. The closest major airport to the geopark is Samarinda International Airport.

== Flora and fauna ==
The area is upstream of five major rivers in Berau and East Kutai, namely Tabalar River, Lesan River, Pesab River, Bengalon River and Karangan River. There is existence of ancient relics, among others, caves, palms, bones and teeth of ancient creatures. According to the results of a 2004 biological expedition by The Nature Conservancy and the Indonesian Institute of Sciences has identified 120 bird species, 200 species of insects, one giant cockroach, 400 species of flora and 50 species of fish. Even from the region precisely in Beriun Mountain, there is orangutan habitat.

== See also ==
- Lubang Jeriji Saléh
