= Sangatta =

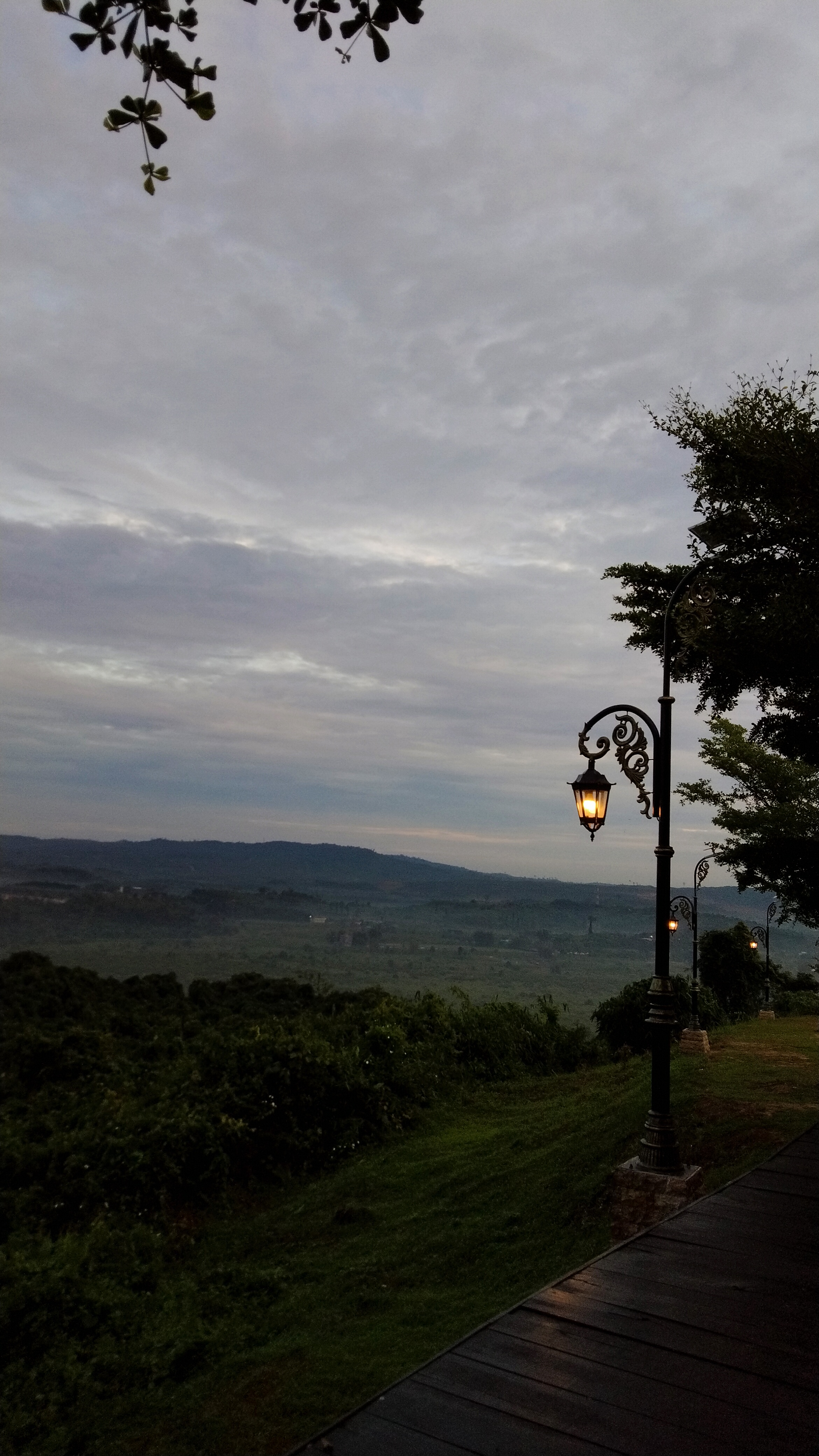
- Bukit Pandang Garden, Teluk Lingga
- Interactive map of Sangatta
- Country: Indonesia
- Province: East Kalimantan
- Regency: East Kutai Regency

Area
  - Total: 181.06 km^{2} (69.91 sq mi)

Population
  - Estimate (mid 2025 estimate): 132,250
- Time zone: UTC+8 (WITA)

Sangatta (Indonesian pronunciation: [saˈŋata], formerly spelt as Sengata and Sangata) is a town located in, as well being the capital of, East Kutai Regency, East Kalimantan, Indonesia. It is however, neither an autonomous city nor a separate district (although it was so in the past).

Sangatta consists of the urban sections of two districts within the regency, North Sangatta (including a mainly urban community, but with the larger district containing 132,250 inhabitants in mid 2025) and South Sangatta (a largely rural area with 33,235 inhabitants in mid 2025). It is the location of East Kutai coal mine, which is one of the biggest coal mines in the world, as well as the biggest in Asia.

== History ==
Until 1989, Sangatta was a sleepy town located inside the former district of Bontang (also including the city), with all settlements concentrated in the south, until the entrance of Pertamina employees in the 1970s. Between 1 December 1989 and 31 October 2005, Sangatta existed as a separate district in East Kutai, before being later renamed into North Sangatta after being split into multiple districts.
