= Celebes Sea =

Marginal sea of the Pacific Ocean

- Sulawesi Sea
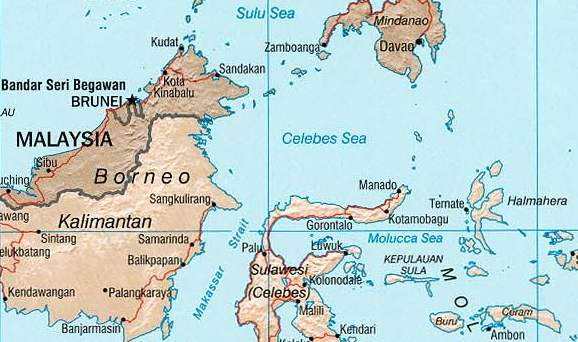

- Location within Southeast Asia
- Location: Southeast Asia
- Coordinates: 3°N 122°E
- Type: Sea
- Part of: Pacific Ocean
- Basin countries: Indonesia, Malaysia, and Philippines
- Max. length: 605 km (376 mi)
- Max. width: 780 km (485 mi)
- Surface area: 472,000 km^{2} (182,000 sq mi)
- Average depth: 3,290 m (10,790 ft)
- Max. depth: 6,220 m (20,406 ft)
- Water volume: 15,530,000 km^{3} (3,726,000 cu mi)
- Islands: Borneo; Mindanao; Sangihe Islands; Sulawesi; Sulu Archipelago
- Settlements: Cotabato City; General Santos; Manado; Pagadian; Tahuna; Tarakan; Tawau; Sandakan; Nunukan; Zamboanga City; Lahad Datu; Kunak; Semporna

The Celebes Sea (/ˈsɛlɪbiːz, səˈliːbiz/ SEL-ib-eez, sə-LEE-beez; Filipino: Dagat Selebes) or Sulawesi Sea (Malay and Indonesian: Laut Sulawesi pronounced [ˌlaʊt̪̚ sulaˈwesi]) of the western Pacific Ocean is bordered on the north by the Sulu Archipelago and Sulu Sea and Mindanao Island of the Philippines, on the east by the Sangihe Islands chain, on the south by Sulawesi's Minahasa Peninsula, and the west by northern Kalimantan in Indonesia. It extends 605 km (376 mi) north-south by 780 km (485 mi) east-west and has a total surface area of 472,000 km^{2} (182,000 sq mi), to a maximum depth of 6,220 metres (20,406 ft). South of the Cape Mangkalihat, the sea opens southwest through the Makassar Strait into the Java Sea.

The Celebes Sea is a piece of an ancient ocean basin that formed 42 million years ago in a locale removed from any landmass. By 20 million years ago, the earth's crust movement had moved the basin close enough to the Indonesian and Philippine volcanoes to receive emitted debris. By 10 million years ago the Celebes Sea was inundated with continental debris, including coal, which was shed from a growing young mountain on Borneo and the basin had docked against Eurasia.

The border between the Celebes and the Sulu Sea is at the Sibutu-Basilan Ridge. Strong ocean currents, deep sea trenches, and seamounts, combined with active volcanic islands, result in complex oceanographic features.

== Delimitation of the Exclusive Economic Zone boundary ==
On 23 May 2013, the Government of the Republic of the Philippines and the Government of the Republic of Indonesia signed an agreement to establish the boundary line that delimits the overlapping Exclusive Economic Zone (EEZ) between the two countries. It has been agreed that north of the boundary line will be under the jurisdiction of the Philippines (named Mindanao Sea) and Indonesia be south of the boundary line (named Celebes Sea).

Point	Latitude	Longitude
1	3° 06’ 41 N	119° 55’ 34 E
2	3° 26’ 36 N	121° 21′ 31 E
3	3° 48′ 58 N	122° 56′ 03 E
4	4° 57′ 42 N	124° 51′ 17 E
5	5° 02′ 48 N	125° 28’ 20 E
6	6° 25′ 21 N	127° 11′ 42 E
7	6° 24′ 25 N	128° 39′ 02″ E
8	6° 24′ 20 N	129° 31’ 31 E

== Extent ==
The International Hydrographic Organization (IHO) defines the Celebes Sea as being one of the waters of the East Indian Archipelago. The IHO defines its limits as follows:

On the North. The Southern limit of Sulu Sea [From Tagolo Point, down the West coast of Mindanao to the Southwest extremity thence to the North coast of Basilan Island (6°45′N 122°04′E), through this island to its Southern extremity, thence a line to Bitinan Island (6°04′N 121°27′E) off the Eastern end of Jolo Island, through Jolo to a point in long. 121°04'E on its South coast, thence through Tapul and Lugus Islands and along the North coast of Tawitawi Island to Bongao Island off its Western end (5°01′N 119°45′E), and from thence to Tanjong Labian, the Northeastern extreme of Borneo] and the Southwest coast of Mindanao.

On the East. A line from Tinaca Point, the Southern point of Mindanao, to the North point of Pulau Sangihe Besar (3°45′N 125°26′E) thence through the pulau-pulau Sangihe to Tanjung Puisan, the Northeast extreme of Celebes [Sulawesi].

On the South. The North coast of Celebes between tanjung Puisan and tanjung Binar (Cape Rivers) (1°20′N 120°52′E) and thence a line to Tanjung Mangkalihat in Borneo, the Northern limit of Makassar Strait [a line joining Tanjung Mangkalihat, Borneo (1°02′N 118°57′E) and tanjung Binar (Cape Rivers), Celebes (1°20′N 120°52′E)].

On the West. The East coast of Borneo is between Tanjung Mangkalihat and Tanjong Labian, the Southern limit of the Sulu Sea.

== Marine life ==
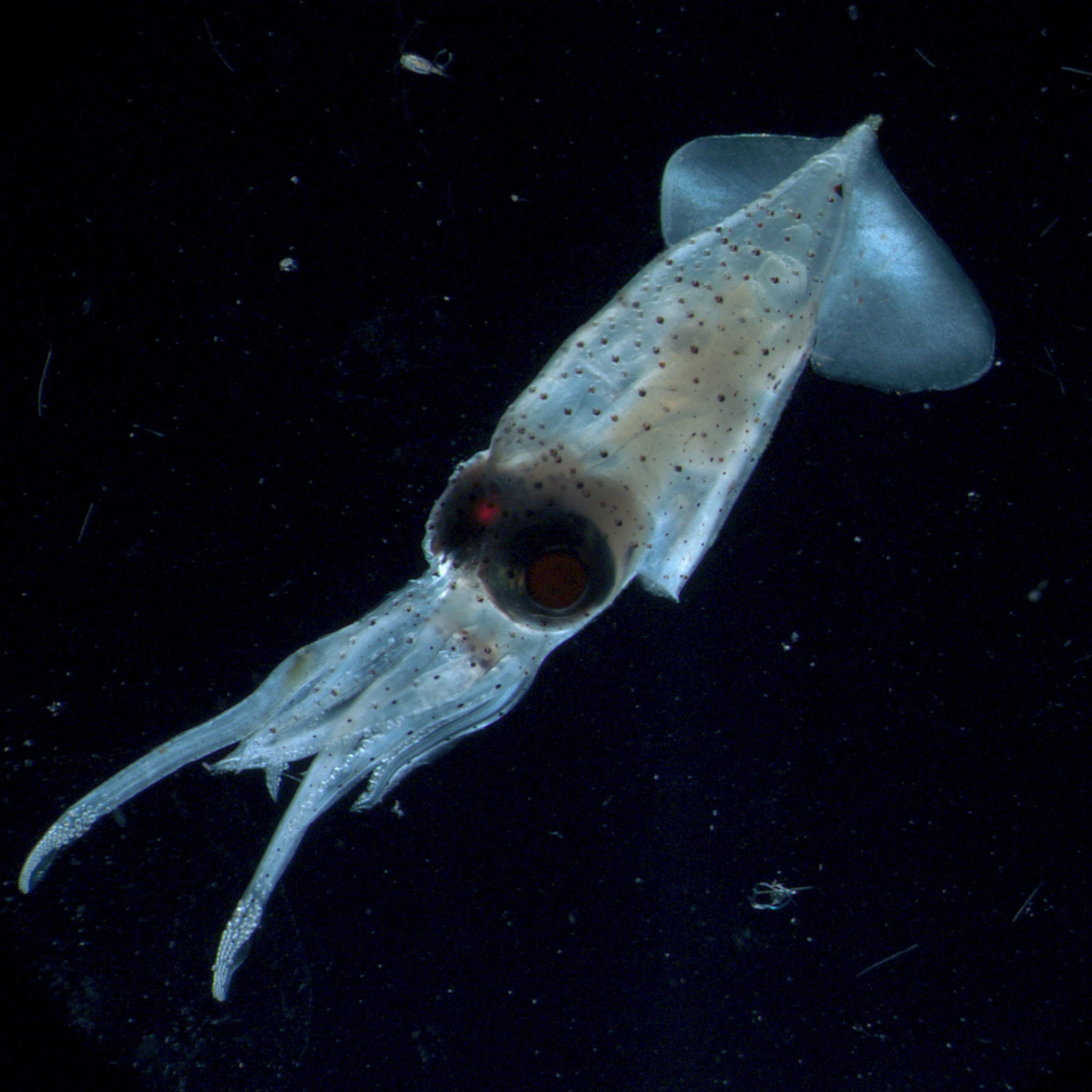
Squid of the genus Enoploteuthis from the Celebes Sea

The Celebes Sea is home to a wide variety of fish and aquatic creatures. The tropical setting and warm clear waters permit it to harbor about 580 of the world's 793 species of reef-building corals, which grow as some of the most bio-diverse coral reefs in the world, and an impressive array of marine life, including whales and dolphins, sea turtles, manta rays, eagle rays, barracuda, marlin and other reef and pelagic species. Tuna and yellowfin tuna are also abundant. In addition to the high abundance of fish caught in the Celebes Sea, this sea also yields other aquatic products like sea tang.

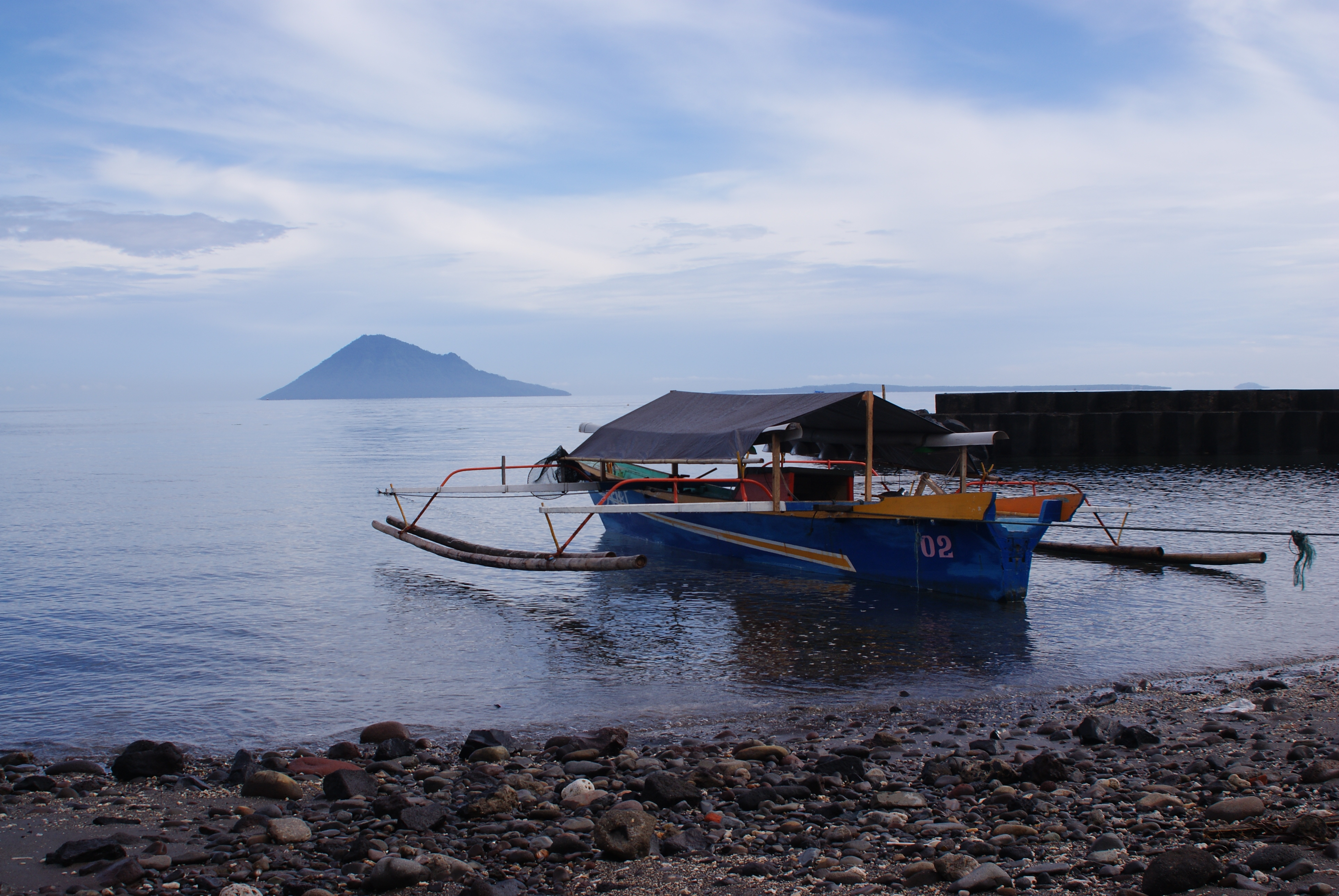
Southern border of Celebes Sea. Kalasey Beach in Bunaken Island, North Sulawesi

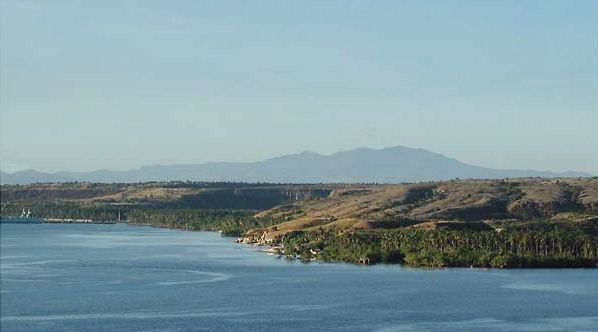
Celebes Sea on its northern border. Coastal area of Maitum, Sarangani

== Commercial significance ==
The Celebes Sea is an important sea route for regional trade. The sea is also popular for scuba diving and luxury ocean cruising.

== Geology ==
The Celebes Sea is underlain by an oceanic plate with a mid-oceanic spreading in the center part. This plate is subducted to the south and north. Several seismic surveys and research drillings were done in this area to gather geological information.

== See also ==
- Bunaken
- Davao Gulf
- Minahasa Peninsula
- Moro Gulf
- Sangir Islands
- Sarangani Bay
- Talaud Islands
