= Bengalon =

- District
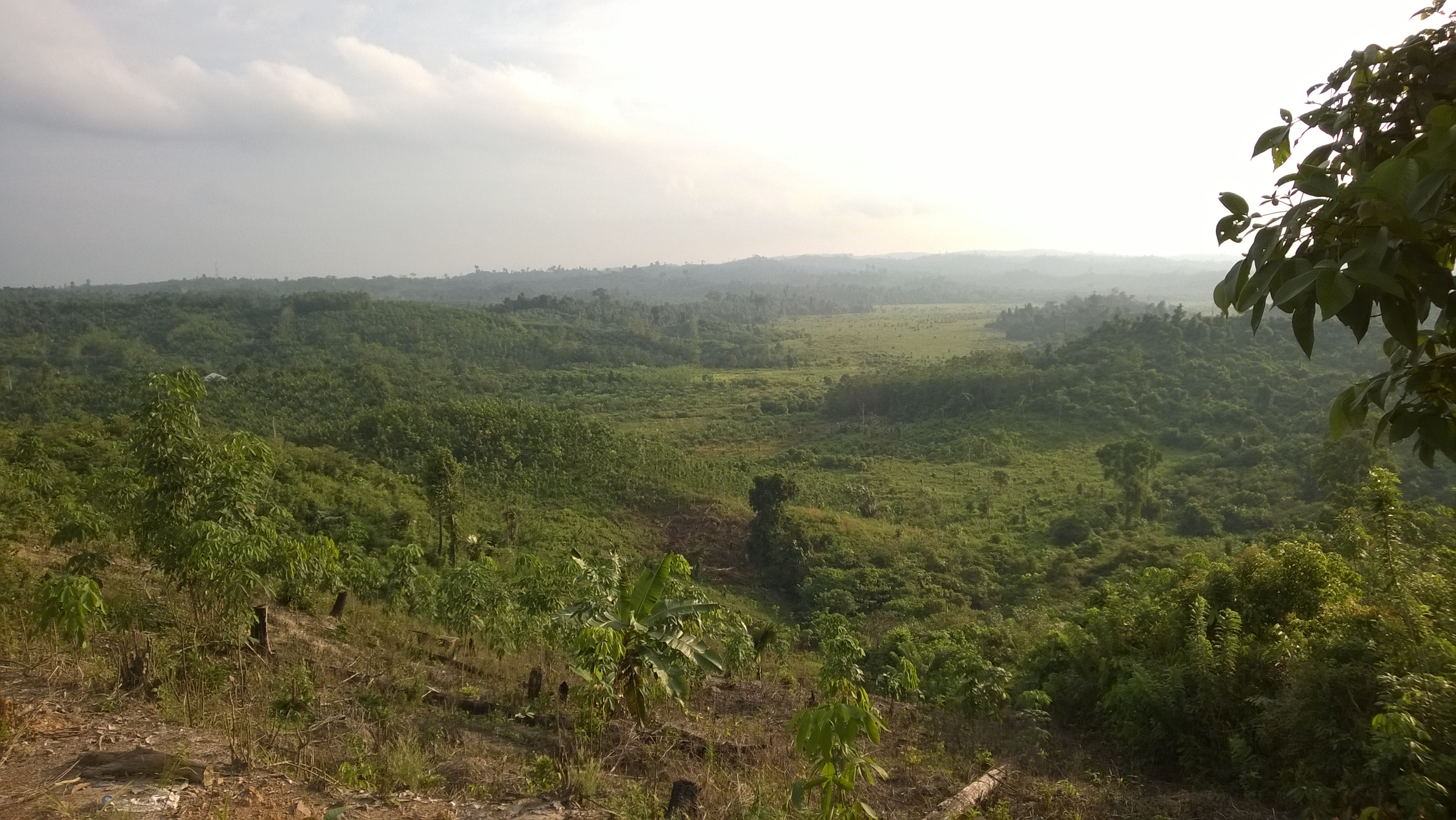
- Muara Bengalon
- Interactive map of Bengalon
- Location Bengalon (Indonesia)
- Coordinates: 0°53′08″N 117°24′17″E
- Country: Indonesia
- Province: East Kalimantan
- Regency: East Kutai
- Established: 16 July 1999
- District seat: Sepaso

Government
  - District head (Camat): Permana Lestari (acting)

Area
  - Total: 3,429.36 km^{2} (1,324.08 sq mi)

Population (2024)
  - Total: 44,397
  - Density: 12.946/km^{2} (33.530/sq mi)
- Time zone: UTC+8 (ICT)
- Regional code: 64.08.09
- Villages: 11

Bengalon is an administrative district (kecamatan) within East Kutai Regency, in East Kalimantan Province of Indonesia. According to the 2010 census, Bengalon was inhabited by 22,698 people, which rose to 45,314 at the 2020 Census, but fell back to 44,397 in mid 2024 according to the official estimates.

Bengalon was formed on 16 July 1999 from the northern parts of Sangatta. It is the location of the Bengalon coal mine. The administrative centre is in the village of Sepaso.

== Etymology ==
There are several theories surrounding the origin of place name Bengalon:

- From a local corruption of the word bungalow, a type of house;
- from Bungalo Mengkaying, the place where Mahaputri Indra Perwati Dewi and Aji Batara Agung Paduka Nira were married; or
- from bengalon, the name of a tree or fruit, abundant along the Bengalon river.

== Governance ==
=== Villages ===
Bengalon is divided into the following eleven villages (desa):

Regional code (kode wilayah)	Name	Area (km^{2})	Population (2020)	Population (2023)	Hamlets (dusun)	RT (rukun tetangga)
64.08.09.2001	Sepaso	36.06	9,391	9,905	6	27
64.08.09.2002	Sekerat	269.31	3,018	3,210	3	16
64.08.09.2003	Keraitan	278.78	332	449	1	2
64.08.09.2004	Tepian Langsat	2,071.76	9,634	5,044	5	18
64.08.09.2005	Tebangan Lembak	290.83	265	432	1	3
64.08.09.2006	East Sepaso (Sepaso Timur)	125.47	4,638	4,900	6	17
64.08.09.2007	South Sepaso (Sepaso Selatan)	234.26	2,835	2,681	4	10
64.08.09.2008	Muara Bengalon	97.70	2,040	1,896	3	12
64.08.09.2009	Tepian Baru	34.08	3,446	3,798	6	20
64.08.09.2010	Tepian Indah	29.90	3,115	3,200	6	22
64.08.09.2011	West Sepaso (Sepaso Barat)	31.16	6,600	6,787	5	16
	Totals	3,429.36	45,314	42,302	52	163

== Transport ==
Lubuktutung is the port for the export of coal, brought in from Sepaso by a new heavy duty railway to the Bengalon Coal Handling Facility.
