= Kaliorang =

District of East Kutai Regency, Indonesia

- District
- Location Kaliorang (Indonesia)
- Coordinates: 0°59′16″N 117°58′48″E
- Country: Indonesia
- Province: East Kalimantan
- Regency: East Kutai Regency

Area
  - Total: 302.93 km^{2} (116.96 sq mi)

Population (mid 2024)
  - Total: 18,908
  - Density: 62.417/km^{2} (161.66/sq mi)
- Time zone: UTC+8 (ICT)
- Villages: 7

Kaliorang is an administrative district (kecamatan) of East Kutai Regency, in East Kalimantan Province of Indonesia. The district to the west of the Karangan River, which empties into Sangkulirang Bay on the east coast of Borneo (Kalimantan). It covers an area of 302.93 km^{2} and had a population of 7,998 at the 2010 Census and 15,355 at the 2020 Census, while the official estimate as at mid 2024 was 18,908. The district's seat is located in the town of Bangun Jaya.

== Villages ==
Kaliorang District is divided into the following seven villages (desa), listed below with their areas and their populations according to the mid-2023 official estimates.

Regional code	Name	Area (km^{2})	Population (2023)
64.08.10.2001	Kaliorang	50.00	2,585
64.08.10.2006	Bukit Makmur	130.18	6,384
64.08.15.2007	Bukit Harapan	14.86	1,400
64.08.05.2008	Cipta Manunggal Jaya	22.60	1,698
64.08.15.2009	Bangun Jaya	13.15	2,340
64.08.15.2010	Bumi Sejahtera	32.89	1,486
64.08.15.2013	Selangkau	106.57	1,789
