= Lubang Jeriji Saléh =

Archaeological site in Indonesia

Lubang Jeriji Saléh cave
- Lubang Jeriji Saléh
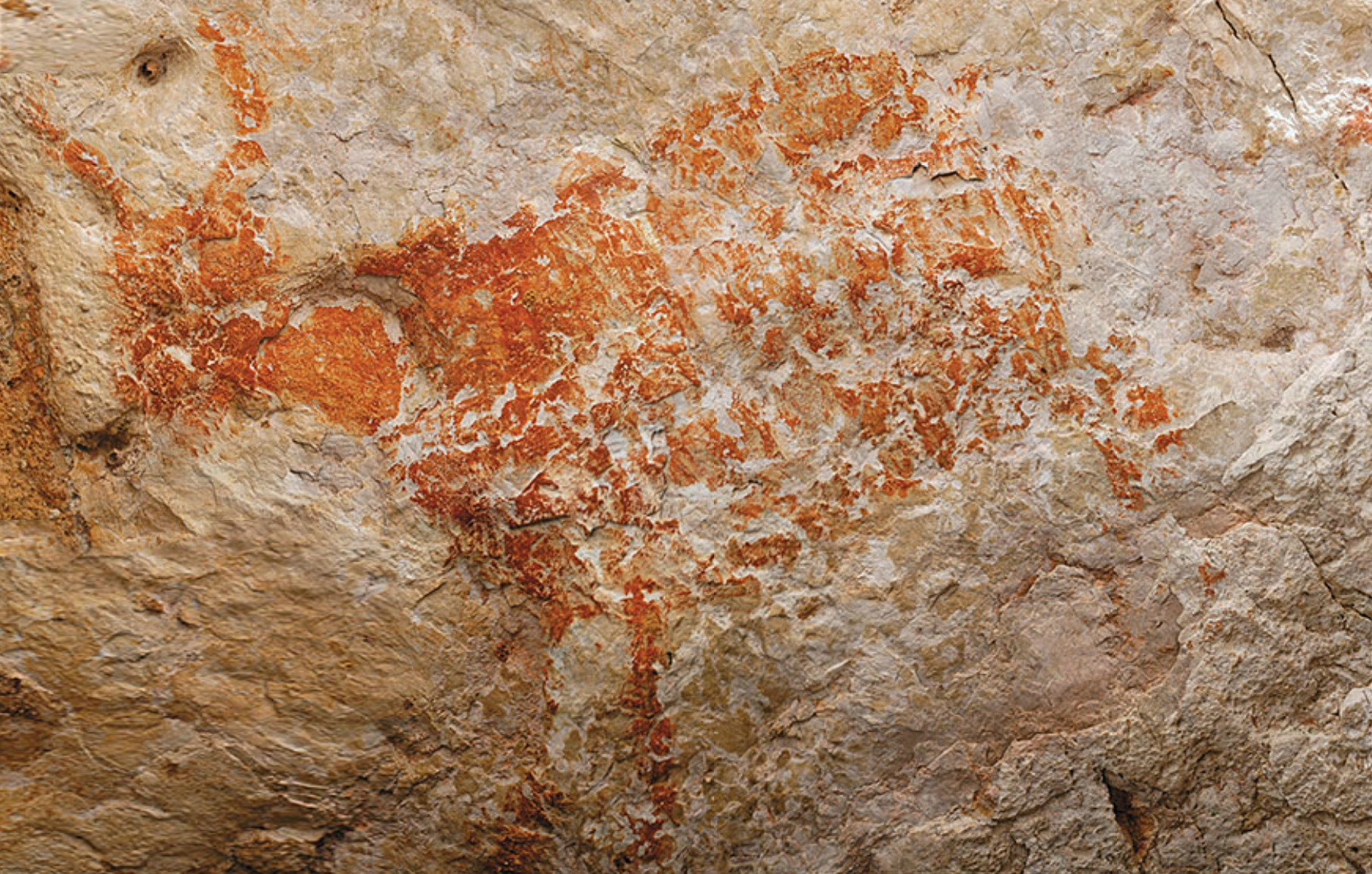
- One of the oldest known figurative paintings in the world, a depiction of a bull, has been dated to be approximately 40,000 years old

- Location in Indonesia
- 1°14′29.3″N 117°19′44.8″E
- Type: Cave paintings
- Periods: Paleolithic
- Location: East Kalimantan, Indonesia

History
- Built: c. 52,000 years ago
- Abandoned: c. 40,000 years ago

Site notes
- Material: Limestone karst
- Discovered: September 1998 by Pindi Setiawan, Luc-Henri Fage, and Jean-Michel Chazine.

Lubang Jeriji Saléh is a limestone cave complex in Indonesia, located within the Sangkulirang-Mangkalihat Karst in the remote jungle of the Bengalon district of East Kutai Regency, East Kalimantan province, on the island of Borneo. In 2018, a team of researchers announced the discovery of what was then believed to be the oldest known work of figurative art in the world among the cave paintings, dating back 40,000 years. However, the same team has since found and dated an elaborate therianthrope rock art panel in the Leang Bulu' Sipong 4 cave in Sulawesi's Maros-Pangkep karst to approximately 44,000 years ago.

== Cave paintings ==
The Lubang Jeriji Saléh site is one of many caves embedded in the steep mountains of East Kalimantan. Its walls and ceiling are covered with hundreds of stencils, outlines of hands and outstretched fingers, within bursts of red-orange ochre or iron oxide paint, as well as figurative cave paintings. An updated analysis of the cave walls suggests that the oldest of the stencils of hands date back approximately 52,000 years, and the earliest painting, a depiction of a banteng bull, was created approximately 40,000 years ago, tens of thousands of years earlier than previous estimates. The bull, part of a trio of rotund bovine creatures, is more than 5 ft (1.5 m) across and also made from reddish-orange ochre on the cave's limestone walls.

Based on 2018 Uranium dating of small limestone crust samples, three phases of decoration were identified. The oldest phase includes the bull depiction and red-orange ochre hand stencils. During the second phase, stencils in a mulberry colour hue, along with intricate motifs and human figures, were created. Human figures, boats, and geometric designs are attributed to the third and youngest phase.

=== Investigation ===
The Kalimantan caves were explored in 1994, and the paintings were first spotted by French caver Luc-Henri Fage. Lubang Jeriji Saléh (initially called Ilas Kenceng in the Kalimanthrope publications) was discovered by Pindi Setiawan, Luc-Henri Fage, and Jean-Michel Chazine in September 1998, guided by Pak Saleh, a Dayak swallow nest hunter. The surveys and the study of the paintings were carried out during three subsequent missions. This vast fossil cavity, located 300 meters above a small river, runs parallel to the cliff and connects to the outside through three successive porches beneath a summit called Ilas Kenceng.

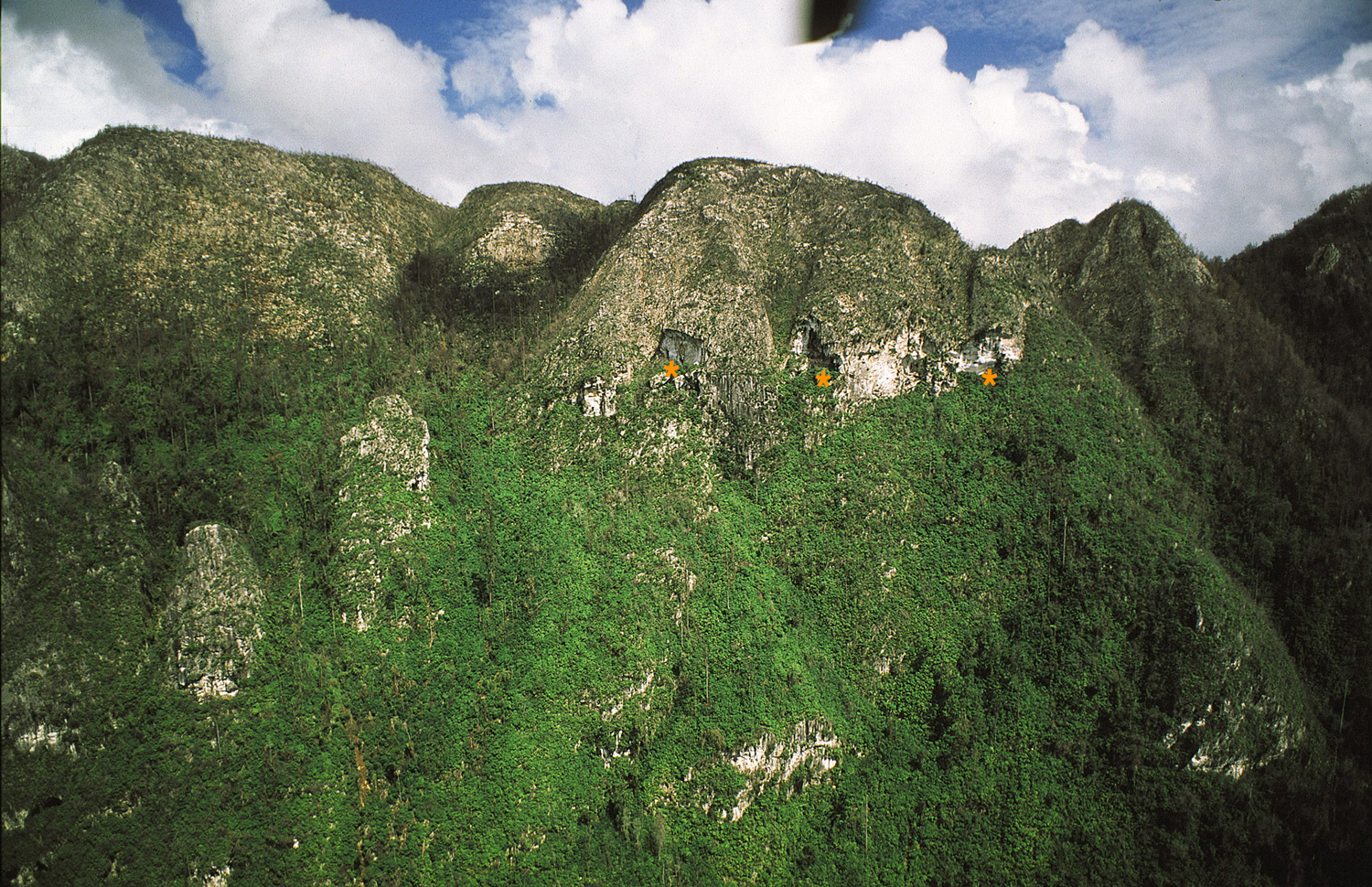
Helicopter view of Marang Mountains (Kalimantan, Indonesia) with the three aligned porches of the Lobang Jerihi Saleh fossil cave (ex-Ilas Kenceng)

The paintings, which are highly varied, are located in ten specific zones. In addition to the ceiling with bovids, a notable element is described as a "bouquet of hands" since it consists of related stencils of five left hands and one right hand.

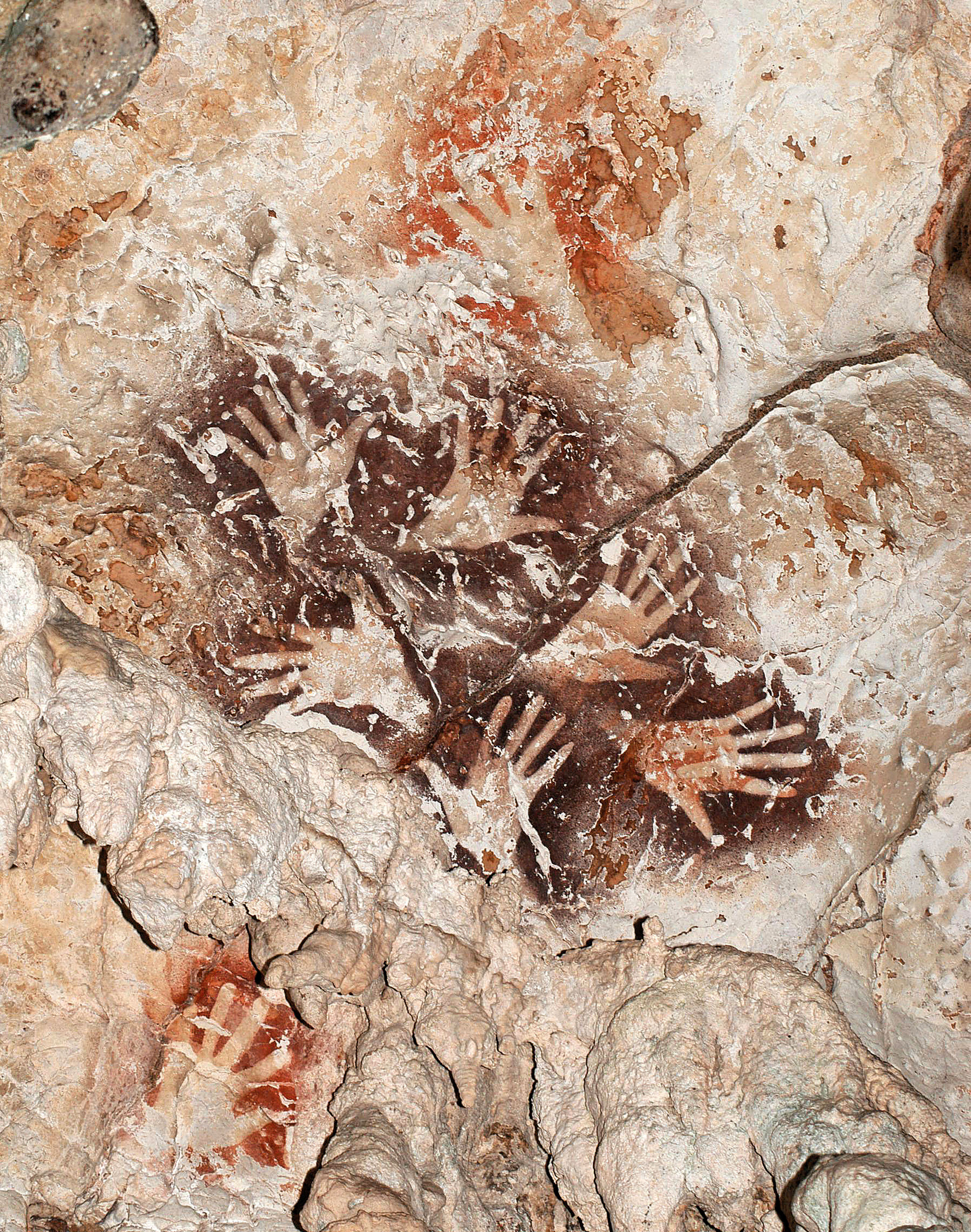
The "bouquet of hands", a remarkable example of Bornean rock art, features six hands arranged in an eternal graphic circle that includes five left hands and one right hand. Notice the older, orange-red hand stencils beneath and above the circular motif.

Luc-Henri Fage's 2003 inventory lists 328 negative hands and 43 representations, primarily anthropomorphs, mammals, and zoomorphs, along with a few signs (stick, barbed wire signs, etc.). Dating published in 2003 on a calcite formation covering two handprints indicated an age of 9,900 years (U/Th combined with C14), providing the first evidence of this Borneo rock expression dating back to the Pleistocene. The 2018 team of researchers and scientists, led by Maxime Aubert from Griffith University, Australia, and Pindi Setiawan from the Bandung Institute of Technology, Indonesia, investigated the site, identified the rock paintings as the world's oldest known figurative art, and published the results in the Nature journal by the end of the year. According to a 2019 publication, the team has since discovered and dated an elaborate therianthrope rock art panel in the Leang Bulu’ Sipong 4 cave in Sulawesi to being approximately 44,000 years old. To date the paint pigments, the team applied Uranium series dating techniques to the calcium carbonate (limestone) particles encrusting the depictions.

=== Importance ===
The discovery of the cave paintings is significant within human cultural history, as it supports the view that cave art was created simultaneously in Southeast Asia and Europe. However, the identity of the people who created the paintings and their subsequent fate remain unknown.

Francesco d'Errico, an expert in prehistoric art at the University of Bordeaux, described the investigation as a "major archaeological discovery", but also suggested that the discovery offered little information on the geographical origins of art.

== See also ==
- Art of the Upper Paleolithic
- List of fossil sites
- List of human evolution fossils
- List of Stone Age art
- Prehistoric art
- Timeline of human evolution
