= East Kutai coal mine =

Coal mine in Indonesia

East Kutai Coal Mine
- Location: East Kutai Regency, Indonesia
- Products: Coking coal

The East Kutai Coal Mine is a coal mine located in the East Kutai Regency. The mine has coal reserves amounting to 2.73 billion tonnes of coking coal, one of the largest coal reserves in Asia and the world. The mine has an annual production capacity of 30 million tonnes of coal.
