= Cape Mangkalihat =

Peninsula on Borneo

Native name: Tanjung Mangkalihat
- Location within Borneo

Geography
- Location: South East Asia
- Coordinates: 1°15′00″N 118°15′00″E

Administration
- Indonesia
- Province: East Kalimantan

Cape Mangkalihat, also known as Cape Sangkulirang, is a cape in eastern Borneo. It is located in the Indonesian province of East Kalimantan, in the regencies of Berau (in the north) and East Kutai (in the south).

The cape, as part of the Sangkulirang-Mangkalihat Karst, is notable for its rock art, dating to between 35,000 and 40,000 years ago.

== Geography ==
Cape Mangkalihat separates the Celebes Sea in the north from the Makassar Strait in the south. It lies north of the Kutai Basin, and is separated from it by the Karangan River. The town of Benua Baru (in the district of Sangkulirang) lies at the base of the peninsula, and the northeastern Makassar Strait forms the Sangkulirang Bay in its south.
