= East Kutai Regency =

Regency in East Kalimantan, Indonesia

East Kutai Regency Kabupaten Kutai Timur
- Regency
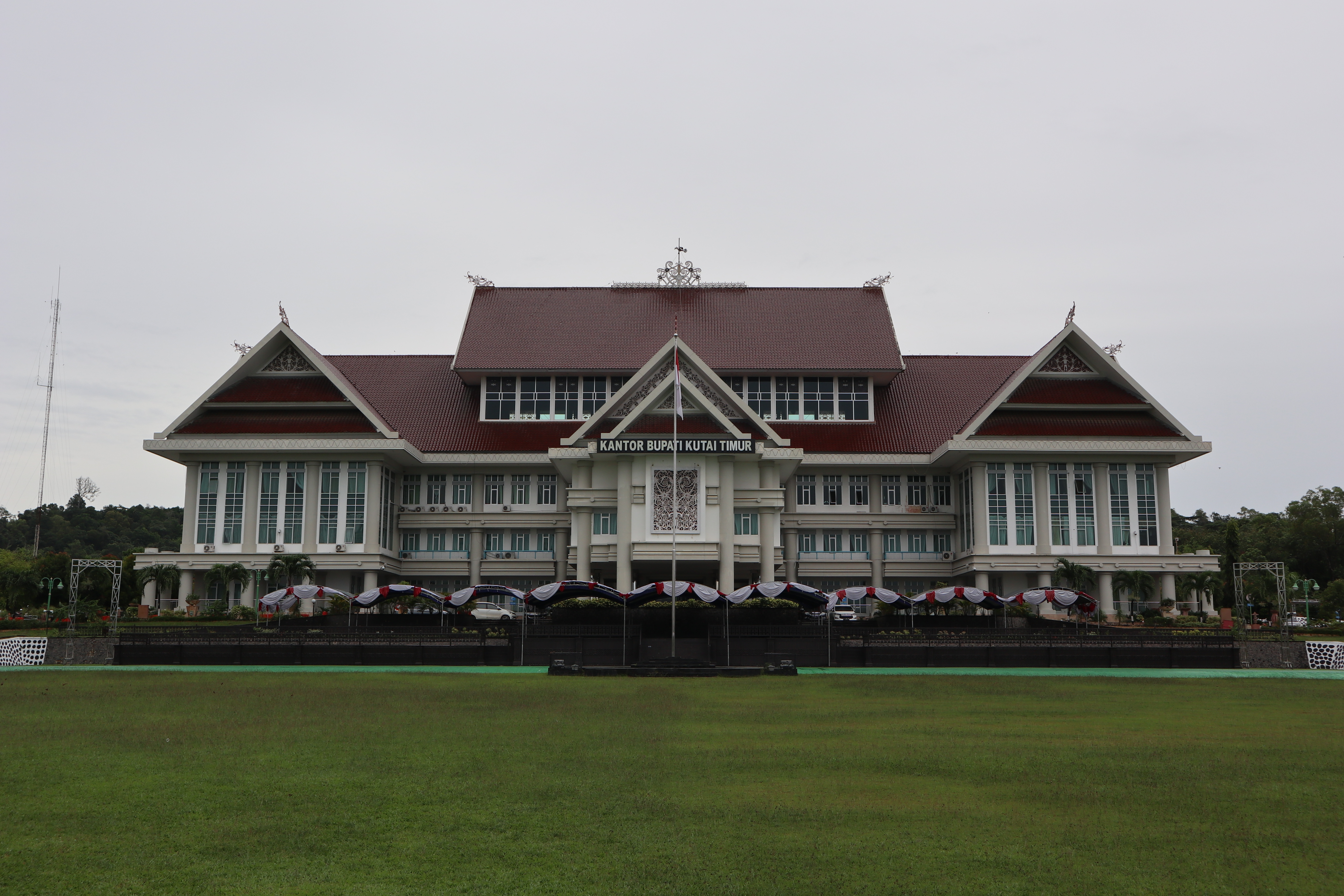
- Regent office building

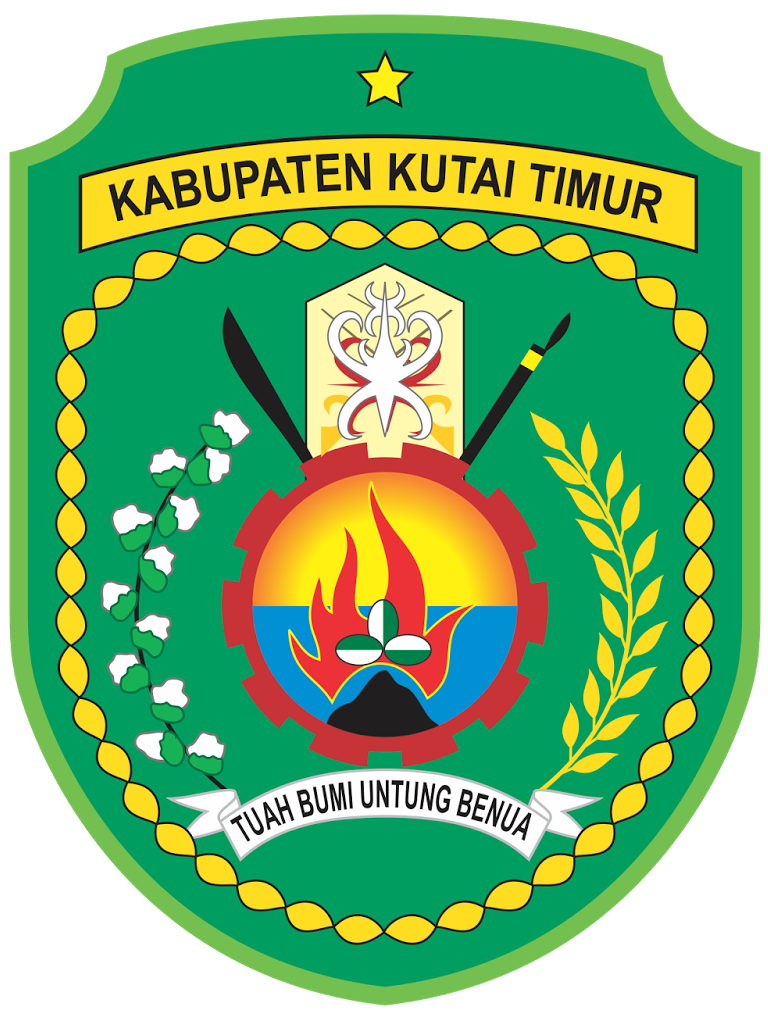
- Coat of arms

- Location within East Kalimantan

- Location in Kalimantan and Indonesia East Kutai Regency (Indonesia)
- Coordinates: 1.03769°N 117.83112°E
- Country: Indonesia
- Province: East Kalimantan
- Capital: Sangatta

Government
  - Regent: Ardiansyah Sulaiman
  - Vice Regent: Mahyunadi

Area
  - Total: 31,819.79 km^{2} (12,285.69 sq mi)

Population (mid 2025 estimate)
  - Total: 464,294
  - Density: 14.5914/km^{2} (37.7914/sq mi)
- Time zone: UTC+8 (ICST)
- Area code: (+62) 549
- Website: kutaitimurkab.go.id

East Kutai Regency (Indonesian: Kabupaten Kutai Timur; pronounced [kabuˌpat̪ɛn ˌkut̪ai̯ ˈt̪imʊr], abbreviated as Kutim) is a regency of East Kalimantan province, Indonesia. It has an area of 31,819.79 km^{2} and had a population of 253,904 at the 2010 census and 434,459 at the 2020 census; the official estimate as at mid 2025 was 464,294 people (comprising 248,235 males and 216,059 females), The town of Sangatta is the capital of the regency.

There are several coal mining companies with concessions around this regency, including Kaltim Prima Coal, one of the largest coal mining companies in Indonesia. The regency also contains one of the largest coal mines in Asia - the East Kutai coal mine.

East Kutai is home to the world's oldest known figurative art at Lubang Jeriji Saléh.

== Administrative districts ==
East Kutai Regency is divided into eighteen districts (kecamatan), tabulated below with their areas and their 2010 and 2020 census populations, together with the official estimates as at mid 2025. The table also includes the locations of the district administrative centres, the number of administrative villages in each district (a total of 139 rural desa and 2 urban kelurahan), and its postal codes.

The districts are grouped for convenience into three geographical sectors (non-administrative), reflecting proposals which have been considered for dividing the present regency into three new regencies:

- (i) The western sector is entirely inland, and equates to what was proposed as a new North Kutai Regency (Indonesian: Kabupaten Kutai Utara), with its proposed capital at Muara Wahau. The district of Muara Kaman (in Kutai Kartanegara Regency) is situated immediately south of this area and is effectively a continuation of it.
- (ii) The southeastern sector includes all of the districts along the southeast coast of the regency, including the most heavily populated areas around the town of Sangatta and the independent city of Bontang.
- (iii) Finally, the last five districts listed in the table below form the northeast corner of the regency, comprising the southern slopes of the Sambaliung Mountains (Pegunungan Sambaliung), which here creates a large peninsula (whose northern half is in Berau Regency) projecting eastwards into the Makassar Strait, and drained by the Karengen River, which reaches at sea at the main town of Sangkulirang; here the proposal was to separate off these five districts to create a new Sangkulirang Regency (Indonesian: Kabupaten Sangkulirang) with its proposed capital at Sangkulirang.

Kode Wilayah	Name of District (kecamatan)	Area in km^{2}	Pop'n census 2010	Pop'n census 2020	Pop'n estimate mid 2025	Admin centre	No. of villages	Post codes
64.08.01	Muara Ancalong	2,281.29	12,511	15,246	15,819	Kelinjau Ilir	9	75656 ^{(a)}
64.08.06	Busang	3,642.17	4,326	6,396	6,213	Long Lees	6	75556
64.08.18	Long Mesangat	238.15	4,250	7,168	7,672	Sumber Sari	7	75654: 75656
64.08.02	Muara Wahau	4,997.22	15,734	35,963	33,375	Muara Wahau	10	75655
64.08.07	Telen	1,711.30	5,766	10,829	10,406	Juk Ayaq	8	75554
64.08.08	Kongbeng	1,096.02	15,631	27,609	33,037	Miau Baru	7	75555
64.08.03	Muara Bengkal	757.95	11,331	14,030	14,007	Muara Bengkal Ulu	7	75656
64.08.17	Batu Ampar	759.22	4,201	7,673	10,007	Batu Timbau	7	75654
Sub-totals	North Kutai sector	15,483.31	73,750	124,914	130,536		61	
64.08.04	North Sangatta (Sangatta Utara)	333.57	72,156	120,873	132,250	Sangatta Utara	4 ^{(b)}	75681
64.08.09	Bengalon	3,389.98	22,698	45,314	46,141	Sepaso	11	75618
64.08.13	Teluk Pandan ^{(c)} (Pandan Bay)	924.94	12,208	18,791	15,465	Teluk Pandan	6	75682
64.08.12	South Sangatta (Sangatta Selatan)	1,201.04	18,194	30,117	33,235	Sangatta Selatan	4 ^{(d)}	75680
64.08.14	Rantau Pulung	916.02	7,203	12,167	15,425	Kebon Agung	9	75683
Sub-totals	Sangatta sector	6,766.53	132,459	227,262	242,555		34	
64.08.05	Sangkulirang ^{(e)}	2,073.13	16,181	26,449	26,131	Benua Baru Ilir	15	75686
64.08.10	Kaliorang	337.09	7,998	15,355	20,344	Bukit Makmur	7	75617
64.08.11	Sandaran ^{(f)}	2,929.05	6,494	12,604	12,214	Manubar	9	75685
64.08.15	Kaubun	544.77	9,622	14,867	19,091	Bumi Etam	8	75619
64.08.16	Karangan	3,685.83	9,133	13,008	13,421	Karangan Hilir	7	75684
Sub-totals	Sangkulirang sector	9,569.87	49,428	82,283	91,203		46	
	Totals	31,819.71	255,637	434,459	464,294	Sangatta	141	

Notes: (a) except the village of Kelinjau Ulu (which has a postcode of 75556). (b) includes the kelurahan of Teluk Lingga.
(c) the most southern district within the regency, Teluk Pandan District largely surrounds the independent city of Bentong on its landward side.
(d) includes the kelurahan of Singa Geweh. (e) includes 16 islands off the coast of Kalimantan. (f) includes 8 islands off the coast of Kalimantan.

== Climate ==
Sangatta, the seat of the regency has a tropical rainforest climate (Af) with moderate rainfall from July to October and heavy rainfall from November to June.

Climate data for Sangatta
Month	Jan	Feb	Mar	Apr	May	Jun	Jul	Aug	Sep	Oct	Nov	Dec	Year
Mean daily maximum °C (°F)	30.0 (86.0)	30.2 (86.4)	30.4 (86.7)	30.4 (86.7)	30.6 (87.1)	30.1 (86.2)	29.7 (85.5)	30.2 (86.4)	30.3 (86.5)	30.9 (87.6)	30.6 (87.1)	30.3 (86.5)	30.3 (86.6)
Daily mean °C (°F)	26.4 (79.5)	26.6 (79.9)	26.8 (80.2)	26.8 (80.2)	27.1 (80.8)	26.7 (80.1)	26.3 (79.3)	26.7 (80.1)	26.7 (80.1)	27.2 (81.0)	26.9 (80.4)	26.7 (80.1)	26.7 (80.1)
Mean daily minimum °C (°F)	22.9 (73.2)	23.0 (73.4)	23.2 (73.8)	23.3 (73.9)	23.7 (74.7)	23.4 (74.1)	22.9 (73.2)	23.3 (73.9)	23.2 (73.8)	23.5 (74.3)	23.3 (73.9)	23.2 (73.8)	23.2 (73.8)
Average rainfall mm (inches)	157 (6.2)	142 (5.6)	190 (7.5)	203 (8.0)	201 (7.9)	157 (6.2)	107 (4.2)	115 (4.5)	117 (4.6)	123 (4.8)	193 (7.6)	190 (7.5)	1,895 (74.6)
Source: Climate-Data.org
