= Makassar Strait =

Waterway between the islands of Borneo and Sulawesi

- Selat Makassar (Indonesian)
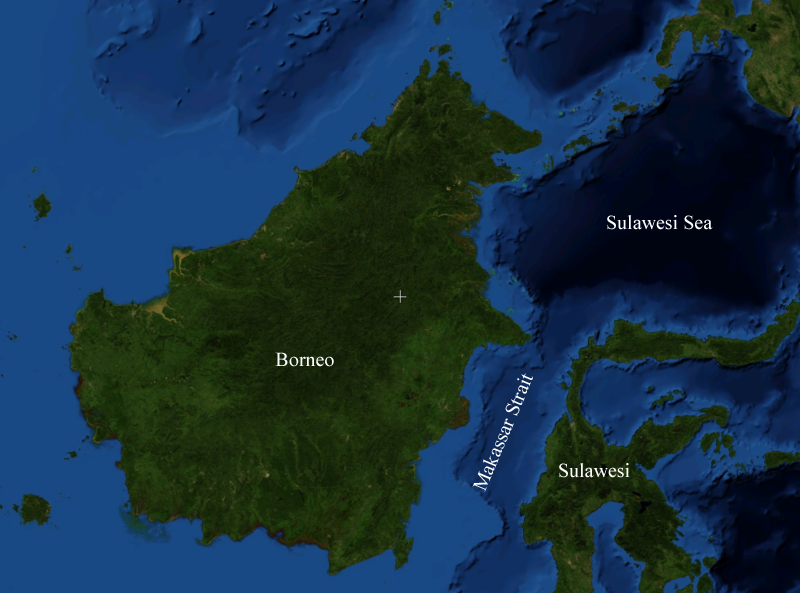
- Makassar Strait Map

- Location of Makassar Strait Makassar Strait (Indonesia) Makassar Strait (Southeast Asia)
- Location: Indonesia
- Coordinates: 0°0′0″N 118°30′00″E
- Type: strait
- Basin countries: Indonesia
- Islands: +100
- Settlements: Balikpapan, Bontang (Kalimantan); Makassar, Palu, Parepare (Sulawesi)
- References: Macassar Strait: OS (Oceans) National Geospatial-Intelligence Agency, Bethesda, MD, USA

Makassar Strait (Indonesian: Selat Makassar) is a strait between the islands of Borneo and Sulawesi in Indonesia. To the north it joins the Celebes Sea, while to the south it connects to the Java Sea. To the northeast, it forms the Sangkulirang Bay south of the Mangkalihat Peninsula. The strait is an important regional shipping route in Southeast Asia.

The Mahakam River and Karangan River of Borneo empty into the strait.

Ports along the strait include Balikpapan and Bontang in Borneo, and Makassar, Palu, and Parepare in Sulawesi. The city of Samarinda is 48 km (30 mi) from the strait, along the Mahakam.

== Extent ==
The International Hydrographic Organization (IHO) defines the Makassar Strait as being one of the waters of the East Indian Archipelago. The IHO defines its limits as follows:

The channel between the East coast of Borneo and the West coast of Celebes [Sulawesi], is bounded:

On the North. By a line joining Tanjong Mangkalihat, Borneo (1°02′N 118°57′E) and Stroomen Kaap (Cape Binar), Celebes (1°20′N 120°52′E).

On the South. By a line from the Southwestern extreme of Celebes (5°37′S 119°27′E), through the Southern point of Tana Keke, to the Southern extreme of Laoet (4°06′S 116°06′E) thence up the West coast of that island to Tanjong Kiwi and thence across to Tanjong Petang, Borneo (3°37′S 115°57′E) at the Southern end of Laoet Strait.

== Geology ==
The Makassar Strait and North Makassar Basin is the result of back-arc extension due to the subduction of a small tectonic slab to the east. Rifting began in the Eocene, with high sedimentation rates filling the extension basin throughout the Eocene through Miocene. These Miocene basin sediments hold very large amounts of oil and natural gas deposits, especially in the hydrocarbon rich Kutei Basin.

The arrival of the Benggai Sula microplate has rotated the Island of Sulawesi in a counter-clockwise direction, allowing opening of the southern Makassar Basin with accommodation by the Adang/Paternoster Fault.

== Gallery ==
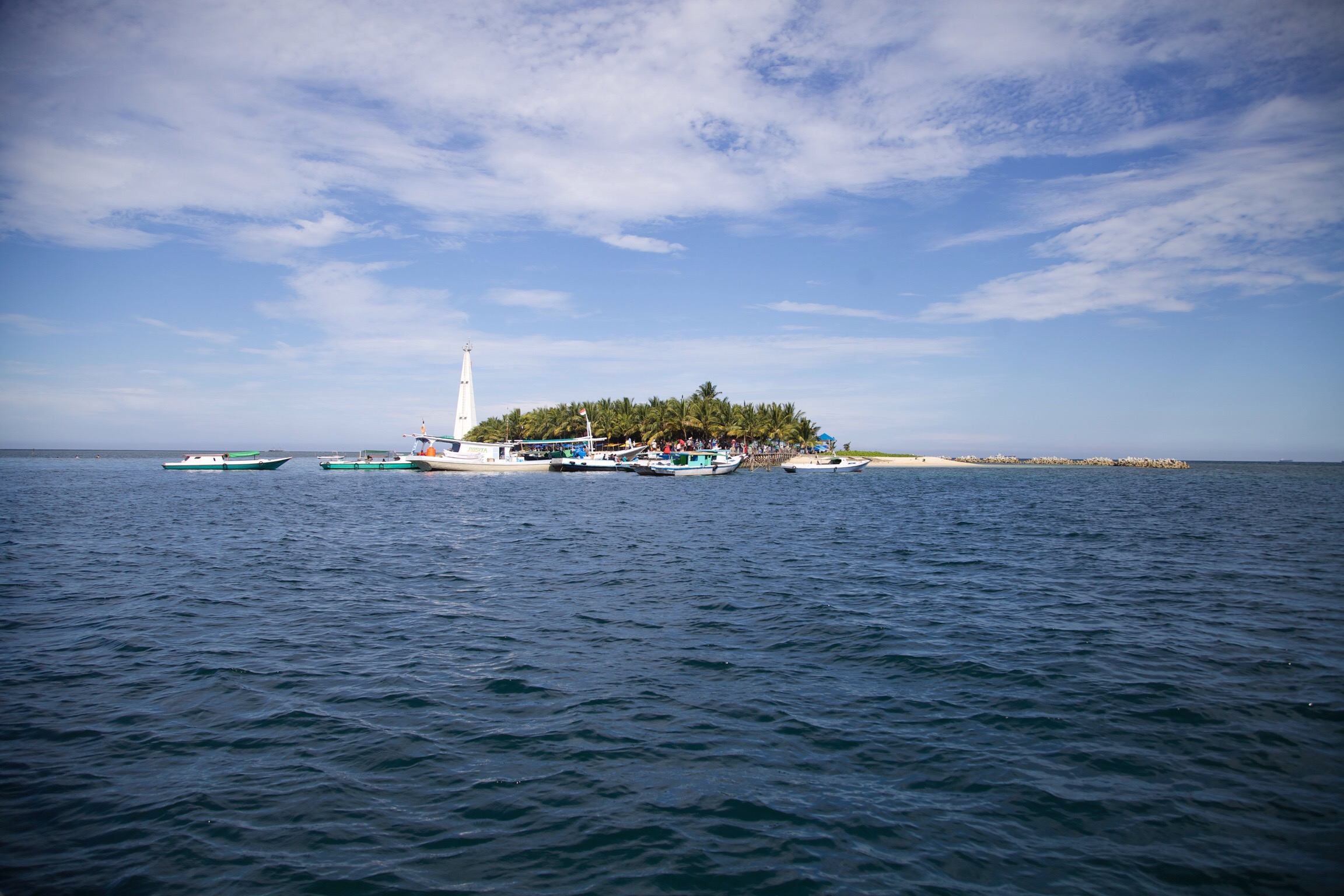
Beras Basah Island in Makassar Strait, administrative part of Bontang.

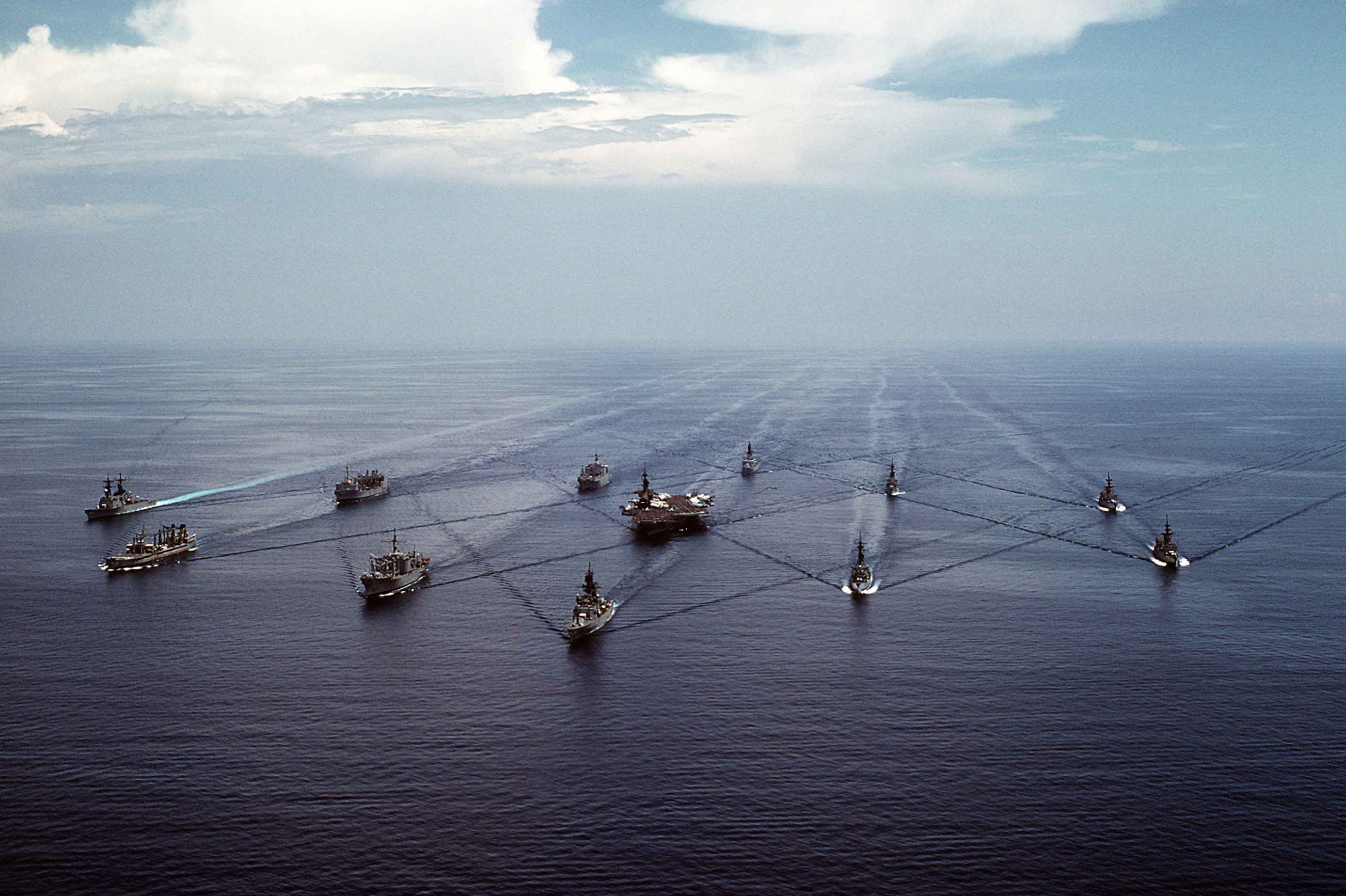
USS Midway (CV-41) and other warships in Makassar Strait, 28 September 1985.

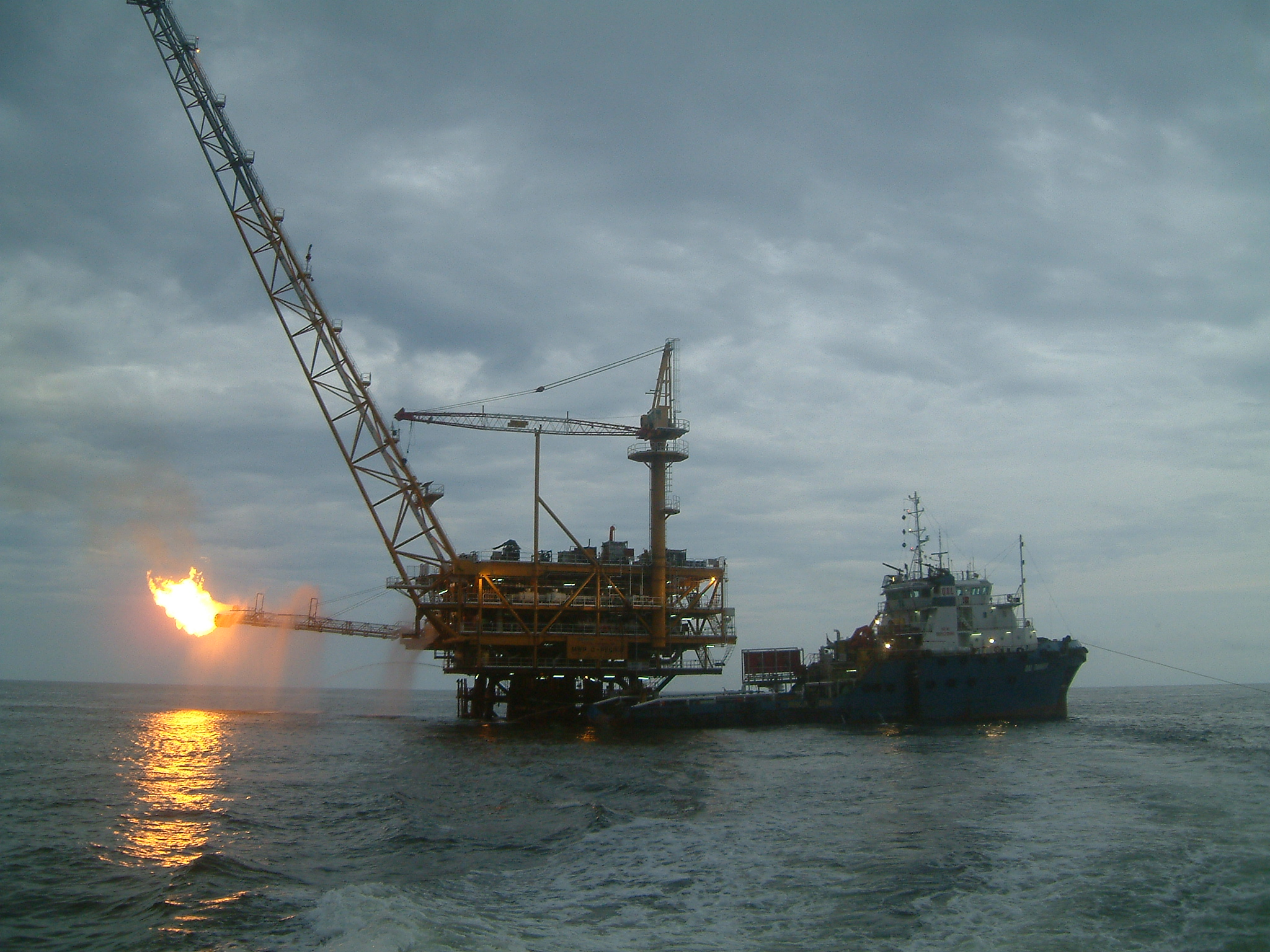
Offshore oil rig in Makassar Strait, 2005.

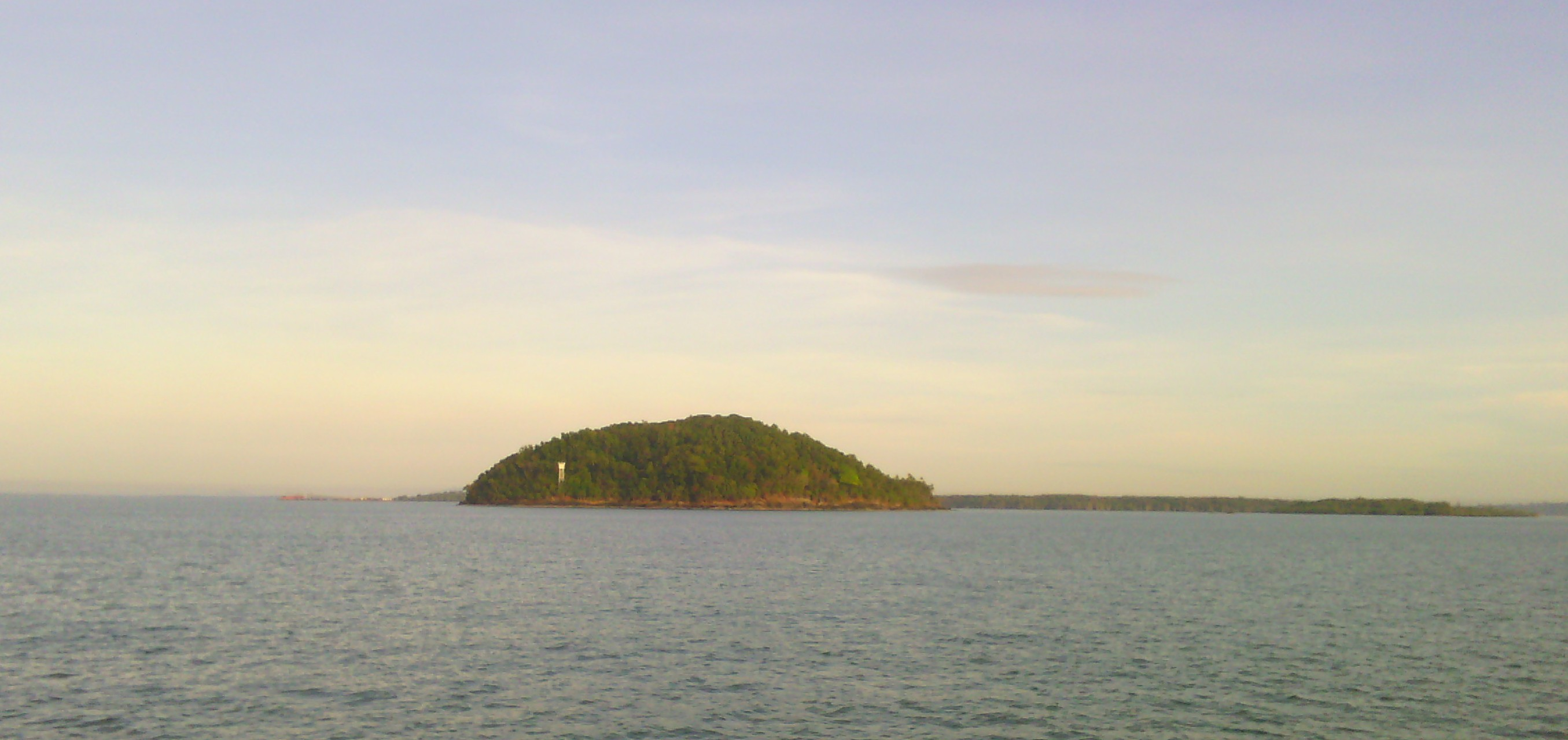
Aur island, administrative part of South Kalimantan.

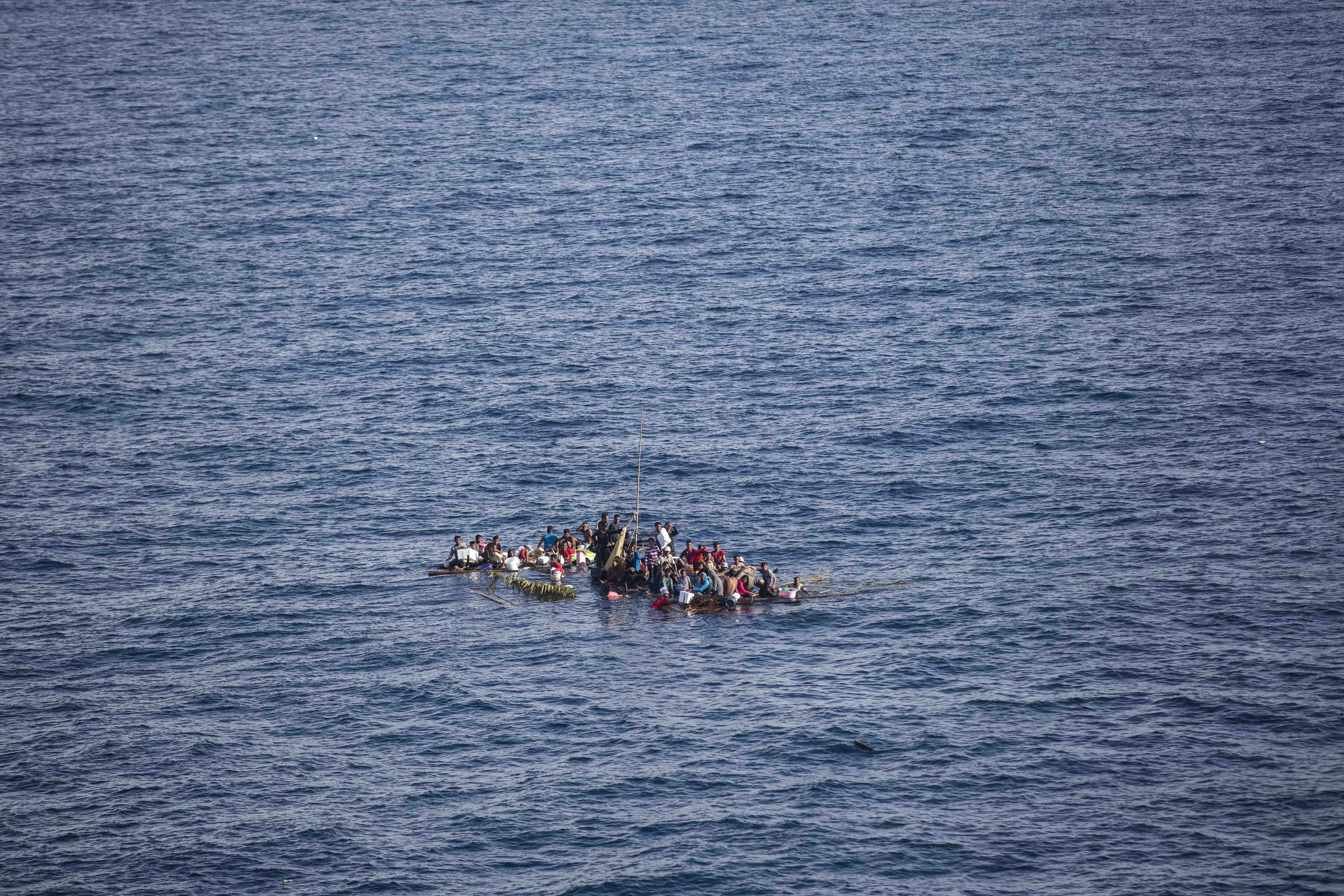
KM Arista ship sunk in Makassar Strait, 10 June 2015.

== See also ==
- Battle of Makassar Strait
- USS Makassar Strait
- Strait of Malacca
- Sunda Strait
- Lombok Strait
- Wallace Line
- Sadang River
