= Rukun warga =

Local administrative division in Indonesia

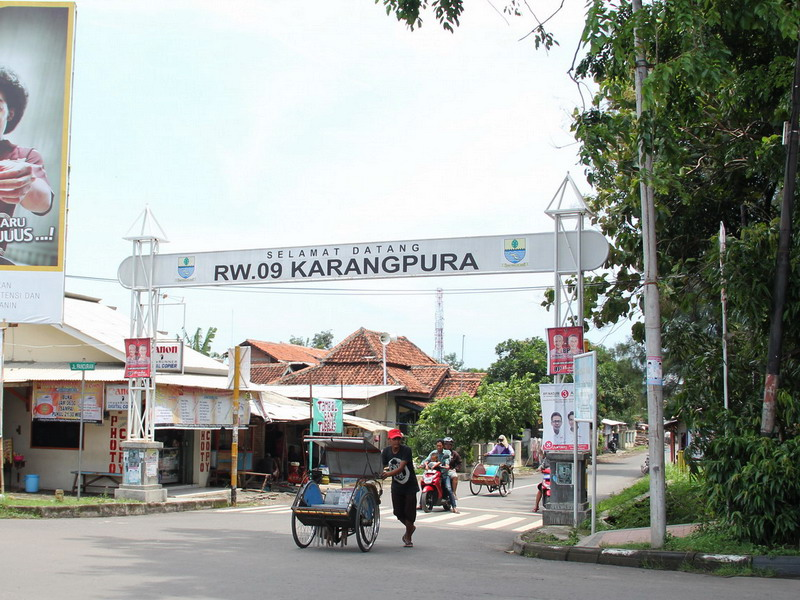
A welcome gate to a rukun warga in Cirebon, West Java

A rukun warga (literally "association of residents"; pronounced [ˌrukʊn ˈwarɡa]), abbreviated as RW, is an administrative division of Indonesia under the village or kelurahan (or under: dusun or village). The formation of local communities is through consultation in the framework of community service set by the village or villages. An RW is further divided into rukun tetangga (RT). Most information about governance and functioning of the RW and RT is in Indonesian. Some non-Indonesian anthropologists have written about the functions and issues of the RW.

== See also ==
- Barangay
- Tonarigumi
