= Rukun tetangga =

Local administrative division in Indonesia

A rukun tetangga (literally "association of neighbours"; pronounced [ˌrukʊn̪ t̪əˈt̪aŋɡa]), abbreviated as RT, is an administrative division of a village in Indonesia, under a rukun warga. The RT is the lowest administrative division of Indonesia, with over 1 million rukun tetangga across the country as of 2021.

The rukun tetangga operates through consultation in the framework of community service, set by the village or villages.

The local level of governance of rukun warga and rukun tetangga also includes the rukun kampung

A rukun tetangga is chaired by a ketua RT elected by its citizens. An RT consists of a number of households (KK).

Most information about governance and functioning of the RT and RW is in Indonesian. Some non-Indonesian anthropologists have written about the functions and issues.

== Malaysia ==
In Malaysia, the Rukun Tetangga refers to the Neighbourhood Watch Scheme introduced by the government in 1975 at the height of the Communist insurgency in Malaysia. Its objective is to foster national unity and security among the people in the neighbourhood watch areas (Kawasan Rukun Tetanga). After the communist insurgency ended in 1990, Rukun Tetangga was converted into an organization for maintaining the well-being of the people in the urban and rural neighbourhood areas.

== See also ==
- Barangay
- Tonarigumi
- People's Association
