= 2026 East Kalimantan protests =

Indonesian protests

- Part of the aftermath of 2025 Indonesian protests
- Date: 21 April 2026
- Location: Samarinda, East Kalimantan, Indonesia
- Caused by: Controversies involving Rudy Mas'ud; Opposition to nepotism
- Goals: See #Demands

Parties
(East Kalimantan) Protesters: East Kalimantan Society Struggle Alliance	Government of East Kalimantan

Lead figures
(East Kalimantan) Erly Sopiansyah; Field Coordinator of the Alliance	Rudy Mas'ud; Governor of East Kalimantan Seno Aji; Deputy Governor of East Kalimantan

Number
2,000–7,000	

Large-scale demonstrations against the Governor of East Kalimantan Rudy Mas'ud were held by the East Kalimantan Society Struggle Alliance on 21 April 2026 in the city of Samarinda. Two locations became centre of the protests: front of East Kalimantan Regional House of Representatives Building and East Kalimantan Governor's Office.

== Background ==
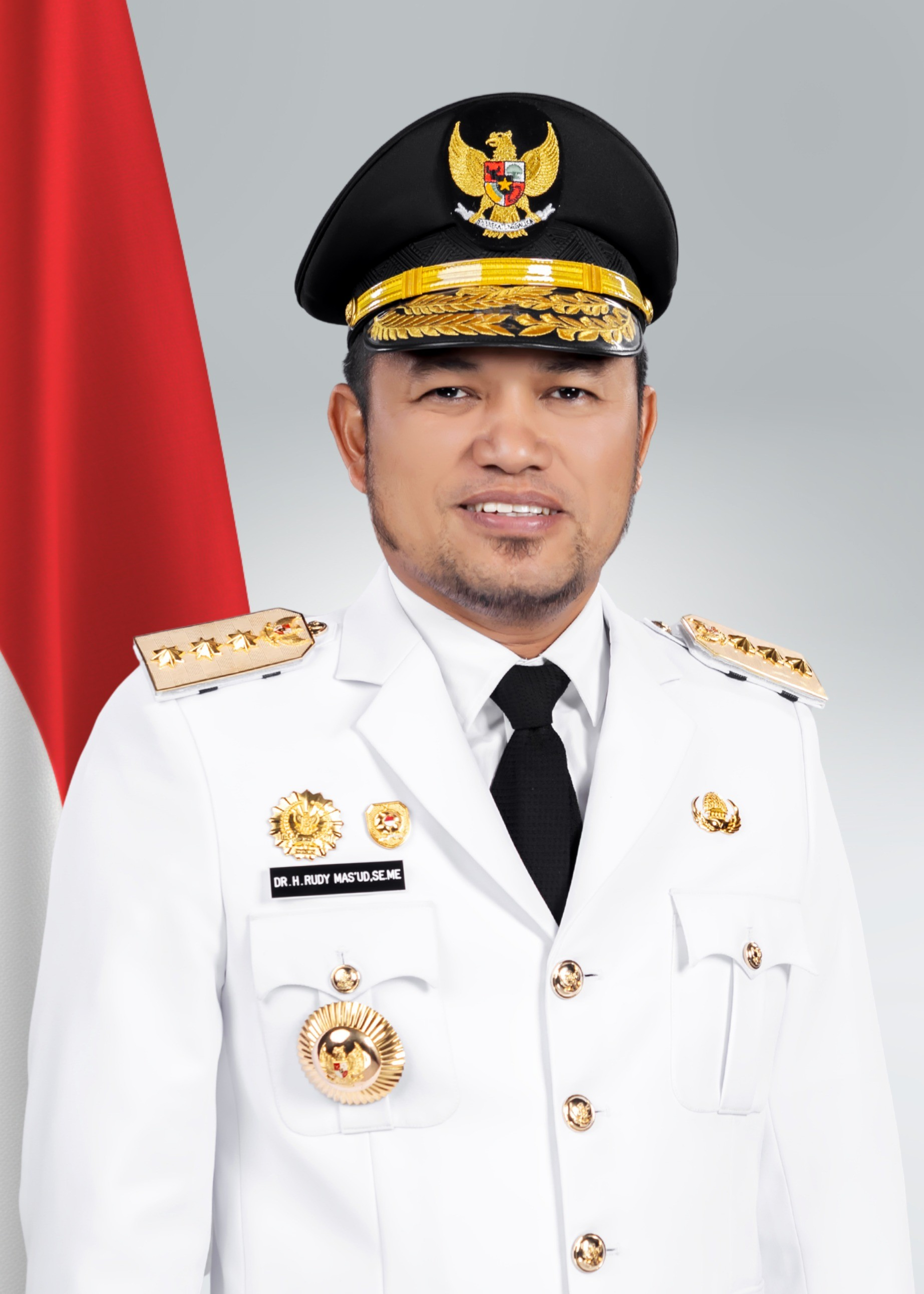
Rudy Mas'ud

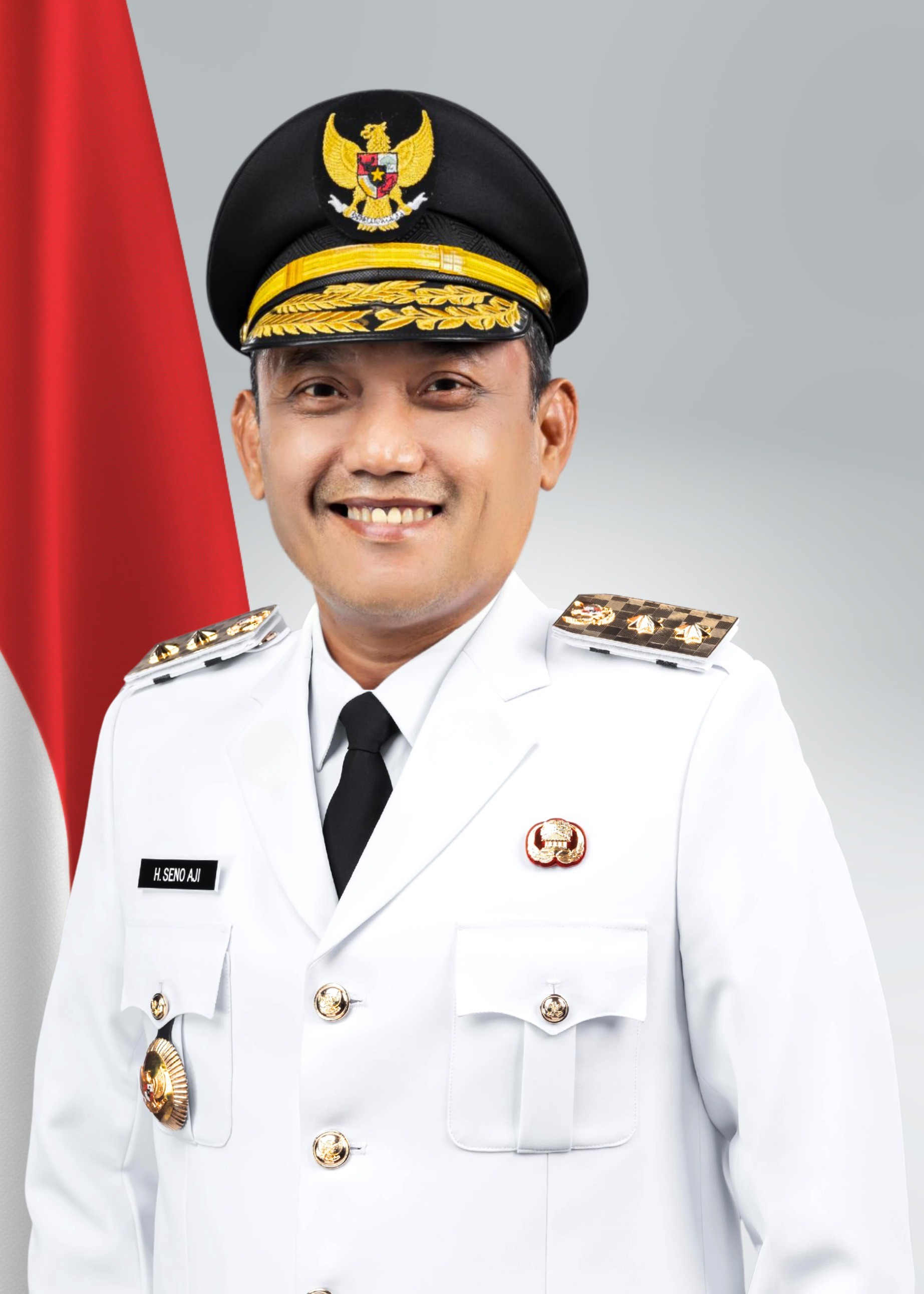
Seno Aji

Governor and Deputy Governor of East Kalimantan, the winners of 2024 election

Rudy Mas'ud is part of the Mas'ud political family, which includes brothers Balikpapan mayor Rahmad Mas'ud (2021–), Penajam North Paser regent Abdul Gafur Mas'ud (2018–2022), and his wife, House of Representatives (DPR) member Sarifah Suraidah (2024–). Before engaging into politics, they were involved in fuel oil trade and shipping businesses through PT Barokah Bersaudara Perkasa and PT Barokah Gemilang Perkasa. Rudy's political career began when he was elected as a DPR member for Golkar in 2019, and soon appointed as the chairman for its East Kalimantan branch, as well as the Deputy Secretary General of the Defence Sector of Golkar. Together with his running mate Seno Aji, he became the Governor of East Kalimantan after winning 55.66% of votes in the 2024 election, beating their opponents Isran Noor and Hadi Mulyadi.

Since 2025, Rudy Mas'ud has attempted to use great amounts of public funds in ways contrary to the Presidential Instruction Number 1 of 2025, which has called for budget cuts. In November 2025, his government attempted to procure an official Range Rover 3.0 Autobiography LWB worth IDR 8,499,936,000, following an auction process with CV Afisera Samarinda, but the car itself remained at East Kalimantan Relational Agency building at Jakarta. On 26 February next year, he defended to the journalists that the procurement should be done in order to maintain "dignity of his province" as home to the future capital of Indonesia (i.e. in Sepaku). However, on 2 March, he officially pulled back this procurement plan following public outcry. Following this incident, the aforementioned company had to return the funds to the regional treasury within 14 days.

== Lead-ups ==
East Kalimantan Society Struggle Alliance (Indonesian: Aliansi Penjuangan Masyarakat Kalimantan Timur), which initially consisted of 4,075 protesters from 44 mass organisations, non-governmental organisations, and labour unions, has selected 21 April as the date of their protests. According to Erly Sopiansyah, its field coordinator, the protests would be held in conjunction with the Kartini Day, out of respect for women's roles in the household economy. He also rejected accusations of backing from Rudy's political rivals.

In Samarinda, East Kalimantan Society Struggle Alliance began to install command post tents in order to facilitate logistics for the 21 April protests, initially at M. Yamin Road, Milono Road, and next to the East Kalimantan governor office. Donations ranged from snacks, drinks, wrapped rice, to cash. Later, the tents soon spread into Paser and Penajam North Paser. The coordinator of 3rd command post, Ivan, claimed that they have received almost 150 cartons of mineral water bottles. Initially, around 4,075 people from 44 mass organisations had joined to participate in the demonstration.

Mobile Brigade Corps from East Kalimantan Regional Police, consisting of 6 Company-Level Units of the riot squad, 2 escape teams, and one Platoon-Level Unit of drone and anti-drone teams were preparing for security at the protests, and several tactical vehicles were deployed. Journalists were prohibited from covering the protest at East Kalimantan governor office. In order to anticipate for injuries during the protests, Health Service of East Kalimantan installed tents at East Kalimantan Governor Office, Military Resort Command 091, Samarendah Park, and Public Works and Housing Service building. Government-owned hospitals, private hospitals, Indonesian Red Cross, and other volunteers took participation.

== Demands ==
Protesters in East Kalimantan have brought three main demands:

1. audit of controversial procurement policies by Rudy Mas'ud;
2. halting of corruption, collusion, and nepotism (KKN) practices throughout East Kalimantan; and
3. urging East Kalimantan Regional House of Representatives to exercise its supervisory function optimally and independently.

== Protests ==
=== DPRD Office ===
Thousands of protesters from East Kalimantan Society Struggle Alliance began to walk from their assembly point in Samarinda Islamic Center Mosque at Slamet Riyadi Road, towards the building of East Kalimantan Regional House of Representatives (DPRD) at 10:30 a.m. Upon their arrival, the first speech was opened by the Forum for the Care of Persons and Athletes with Disabilities with demands regarding planned social aids (which had been stopped at the time of Rudy's rise of power) and employment issues, then followed by Paser Dayaks coming from Penajam North Paser. Several university students climbed and teared a billboard featuring the speaker of DPRD and other members, replacing it with their banner with three protest demands.

The Deputy Speaker of East Kalimantan DPRD, Ekti Imanuel met the masses and listened to their demands, while its Speaker, Hasanuddin Mas'ud was not in Samarinda. The legislature announced in a signed document that they will respond to their demands as well as to prompt an audit process of the government's policies. The Chairman of Golkar Fraction at East Kalimantan DPRD, Muhammad Husni Fahruddin also made an apology to the protesters and acknowledged that their budgeting and supervisory functions did not work well. Maulana, a student from the Faculty of Law at Mulawarman University, was found unconscious following clashes at the entrance, and evacuated by doctors from East Kalimantan Regional Police and Samarinda Regional Police.

=== Governor Office ===
Meanwhile, protesters at front of the East Kalimantan governor office successfully infiltrated the barbed wire fences, then attempting to push through the sides of building's main fences. Some of them have entered the office's front page. Field General of the East Kalimantan Society Struggle Alliance, Faturrahman, calmed down the masses, calling them to wait for the arrival of Rudy Mas'ud and Seno Aji. Medical team from the Kalimantan Javanese Families Friendship (SIJAKA) was on standby at the governor office, and they have handled 5 protesters who suffered either asphyxiation or fatigue. One provocateur was found carrying flare and smoke bomb and later arrested. Street vendors inside the location saw increases of their earnings during the demonstration.

Entering 6:40 p.m., the protesters began to throw blunt objects, such as glass bottles, large stones, and pieces of wood towards security guards. As a result, one policeman suffered wounds from thrown stones, and this attack was possibly done by infiltrating provocateurs. Following this, the police forcibly dispersed the protesters with a water cannon car. Rudy quitted from the office building at 9:10 p.m. with escort, ignoring protesters or journalists, as the government decided to not accept the masses who requested for audience.

== Reactions ==
Mayor of Samarinda Andi Harun announced that public services would continue to open in the 21 April protests. Ombudsman Representative Chairman in East Kalimantan, Mulyadin, requested to the police to strictly follow standard operational procedures (SOP) and reminded them not to act intimidatively, but rather with humanist and persuasive approach.

== See also ==
- 2025 Pati demonstrations
