= Ihwan Datu Adam =

Indonesian politician (1964–2021)

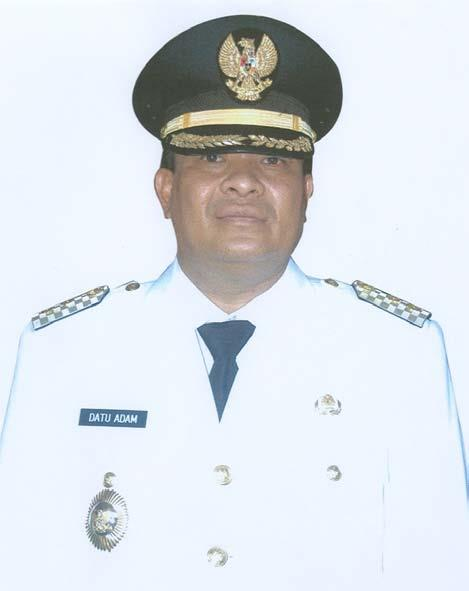

Member of People's Representative Council
- In office 10 January 2017 – 1 October 2019
- President: Joko Widodo
- Constituency: East Kalimantan

Member of East Kalimantan Regional People's Representative Council
- In office 31 August 2009 – 14 May 2012
- Governor: Awang Faroek Ishak

Regent of North Penajam Paser (Acting)
- In office 12 September 2007 – 31 July 2008
- Governor: Yurnalis Ngayoh
- Preceded by: Yusran Aspar
- Succeeded by: Andi Harahap

Vice Regent of North Penajam Paser
- In office 10 July 2003 – 12 September 2007
- Governor: Suwarna Abdul Fatah; Yurnalis Ngayoh
- Preceded by: office established
- Succeeded by: Mustaqim M.Z.

Personal details
- Born: October 10, 1964 Makassar, South Sulawesi
- Died: January 25, 2021 (aged 56) Jakarta, Indonesia
- Party: Democratic Party
- Other political affiliations: Indonesian Democratic Party of Struggle (2002-2011); Golkar (before 2002)

Ihwan Datu Adam (10 October 1964 – 28 January 2021) was an Indonesian politician who became the Vice Regent of North Penajam Paser from 2003 until 2007, member of the Regional People's Representative Council of East Kalimantan from 2009 until 2012, and as the member of the People's Representative Council from 2017 until 2019.

== Early life and education ==
Ihwan was born on 10 October 1964 in Makassar, the capital of South Sulawesi. Ihwan studied at the Muhammadiyah Elementary School in Luwuk and graduated in 1977. Ihwan continued his studies at the Toli-Toli State Junior High School No. 1 in 1981 and Toli-Toli State High School No. 1 in 1984. He continued his studies at the Surapati University and graduated with a degree in economics (S.E.) in 2004.

== Political career ==
=== Vice Regent of North Penajam Paser ===
Ihwan started his political career in 2002. He joined the Indonesian Democratic Party of Struggle (PDIP) that year and became the running mate of Yusran Aspar in the 2003 North Penajam Paser regency election. The election, in which only members of the Regional People's Representative Council of North Penajam Paser could vote, was won by Ihwan and Yusran. The pair garnered 13 votes and won with a margin of a vote against their opponent. Ihwan and Yusran was inaugurated a month after the elections.

In 2007, Yusran Aspar was convicted of corrupting funds for the construction of civil servants housing. Yusran was reprimanded from his office, and Ihwan succeeded him as the acting regent on 12 September 2007.

=== 2008 North Penajam Paser regency election ===
Several months into his tenure as acting regent, Ihwan announced his candidacy in the second North Penajam Paser regency election. Ihwan chose Nursyamsa Hadis as his running mate. He was endorsed by PDIP and the Patriot Party. The couple obtained 13,457 votes (19.26% of the total votes) and lost the elections to Andi Harahap and Mustaqim MZ. Ihwan, the acting regent, handed over his office to Andi Harahap on 31 July 2008.

=== 2009 legislative election ===
A year after his failed candidacy in the North Penajam Paser regency election, Ihwan ran as a candidate for the Regional People's Representative Council of East Kalimantan in the 2009 legislative election. He ran as a candidate from the 2nd East Kalimantan electoral district, which covers Balikpapan, North Penajam Paser, and Paser. Ihwan won the election and was subsequently inaugurated on 31 August 2009. Ihwan was initially seated in the Commission I of the council, which handles governance, law and human rights, but was reassigned some time later to Commission II, which handles finance and economy.

=== 2011 Banggai regency election ===
Ihwan had announced his intentions to run in the 2011 Banggai regency election since 2009. Ihwan stated that he was endorsed by PDIP. Wawan Abdul Rahman, a youth activist from Banggai, recommended that Ihwan should pick a Democratic Party member as his running mate. Ihwan eventually chose Mustar Labalo, a Banggai parlementarian from the Democratic Party, as his running mate. In his campaign promise, Ihwan stated that he "would not create a divider between himself and the people" and that he would "establish camps in district offices that would accommodate people's aspiration".

However, the chairman of PDIP in Banggai, Suryanto, stated that the party has never endorsed Ihwan. Ihwan's candidacy resulted in his expulsion from the party and his dismissal from the East Kalimantan Regional People's Representative Council. The General Elections Commission in Banggai later declared Ihwan as ineligible to run in the elections, leading to the beating of the commission's chairman by one of Ihwan's supporters. After his expulsion from PDIP, Ihwan joined the Democratic Party in 2012.

=== 2014 legislative election ===
Ihwan ran as a candidate for the People's Representative Council in the 2014 legislative election, this time as a member of the Democratic Party. Ihwan was listed as candidate number three in the ballot. The Democratic Party won only one seat from the East Kalimantan electoral district in the election, excluding Ihwan.

=== 2015 Central Sulawesi gubernatorial election ===
At the 2015 Central Sulawesi gubernatorial election, Ihwan was chosen by Rusdy Mastura as his running mate. Rusdy and Ihwan officially registered themselves as a candidate on 27 July 2015. The couple adopted the abbreviation Rusdihwan and the tagline "Humble Leader and Pro People" (Pemimpin Sederhana dan Pro Rakyat). Rusdy and Ihwan was supported by the Golkar Party and People's Conscience Party. The couple was also supported by non-parliamentary parties such as the People's Democratic Party.

In advance of the gubernatorial election, a debate was held in November 2015. However, the second round of the debate prematurely ended during the second segment, after the moderators forgot to bring the envelopes containing the question. The envelopes were left at the General Elections Commission building, causing the debate to end due to a lack of available questions asked to the contestants. Chaos soon ensued in the debate venue, and members of the General Elections Commission were escorted outside the building by police; Rusdy and Ihwan later left the venue. Antara remarked that the incident was the first case where a gubernatorial debate prematurely ended. Several days later, Rusdy and Ihwan announced their refusal to participate in the third round of the debates, citing the prior commotion as their reason.

Elections were held on 9 December 2015, in line with other elections held during the 2015 Indonesian local elections. Initial quick counts favored Ihwan's opponent, Longki Djanggola and Sidarto. Official results were announced ten days after the election, declaring Longki and Sidarto as the winner. Rusdy and Ihwan obtained 620,011 votes (45,50% of the total votes).

== Member of the People's Representative Council ==
=== Background ===
Norbaiti Isran Noor, the Democratic Party MP from East Kalimantan, resigned in 2015 after being nominated in the 2015 Indonesian local elections. As Noorbaiti was the first candidate on the ballot, the candidate after her, Adji Farida Padmo Ardans, replaced her on 15 December 2015. Farida later died on 22 March 2016, leaving the succession to Ihwan. Ihwan replaced Farida after being inaugurated on 10 January 2017.

=== Commission assignment ===
Ihwan was assigned in the Commission VII of the People's Representative Council, which handles energy, natural mineral resources, research and technology, and environment.

== Death ==
Ihwan died at 00.00 on 25 January 2021 in Jakarta, Indonesia. Chairman of the Democratic Party Agus Harimurti Yudhoyono delivered his condolences. He was buried at a public cemetery in North Penajam Paser the following day, with the Vice Regent of North Penajam Paser, Hamdam, delivering the eulogy.
