= 2018 East Kalimantan gubernatorial election =

← 2013	27 June 2018	2024 →
- Turnout: 58.1%
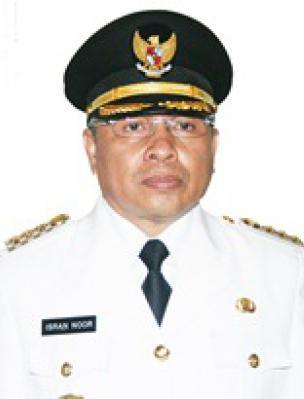

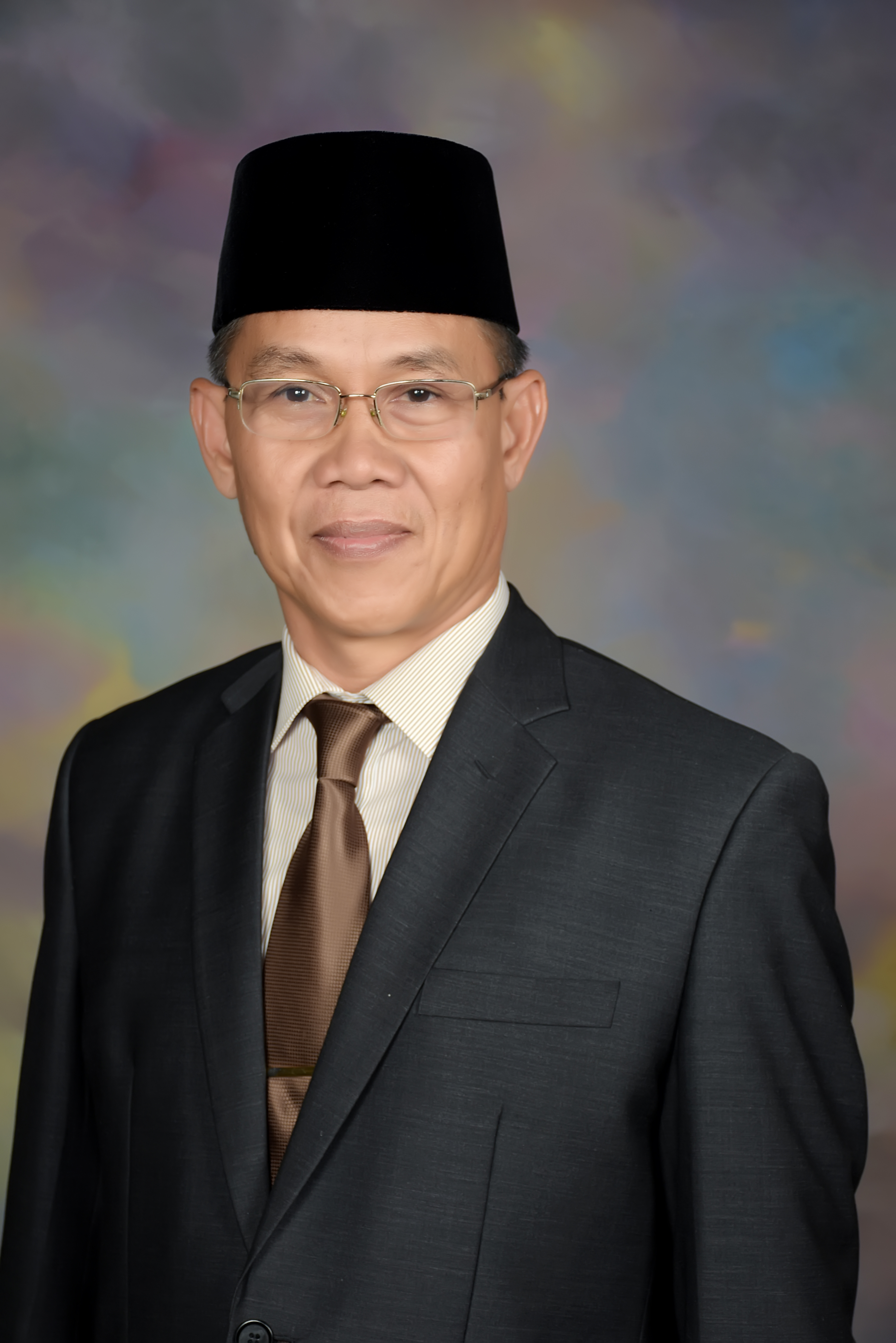

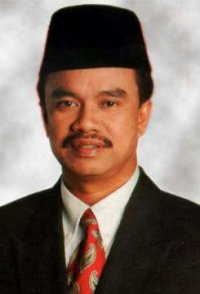

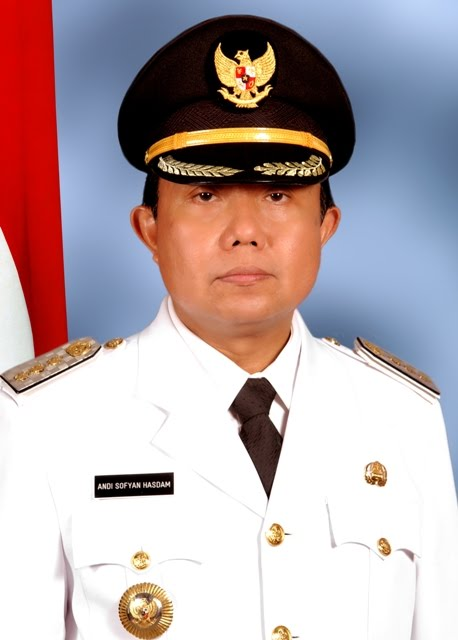
Nominee	Isran Noor	Rusmadi
Party	Independent	PDI-P
Running mate	Hadi Mulyadi	Safaruddin
Popular vote	417,711	324,226
Percentage	31.33%	24.32%
Nominee	Syaharie Ja'ang	Andi Sofyan Hasdam
Party	Demokrat	Golkar
Running mate	Awang Ferdian Hidayat	Rizal Effendi
Popular vote	302,987	288,166
Percentage	22.73%	21.62%
- Results by regency/city. Regencies/cities won by Isran Noor are in dark red (■), Syaharie in blue (■), Andi Sofyan in gold (■), Rusmadi in yellow (■).
Governor before election
Awang Faroek Ishak
Elected Governor
Isran Noor

The 2018 East Kalimantan gubernatorial election took place on 27 June 2018 as part of the simultaneous local elections. It was held to elect the governor of East Kalimantan along with their deputy, whilst members of the provincial council (Dewan Perwakilan Rakyat Daerah) will be re-elected in 2019.

With incumbent Awang Faroek Ishak having served two terms, former regent of East Kutai won a four-way race with 31 percent of the votes. Other candidates are mayors of Samarinda Syaharie Ja'ang and Bontang Andi Sofyan Hasdam, in addition to the provincial secretary Rusmadi Wongso.

== Timeline ==
Registration for party-backed candidates were opened between 8 and 10 January 2018, while independent candidates were required to register earlier in late 2017. The final voter count was set at 2,330,156 in June 2018. The campaigning period would commence between 15 February and 24 June, with a three-day election silence before voting on 27 June.

== Candidates ==
#	Candidate	Position	Running mate	Parties
1	Andi Sofyan Hasdam	Mayor of Bontang (2001-2011)	Rizal Effendi	Golkar; Nasdem
2	Syaharie Ja'ang	Mayor of Samarinda	Awang Ferdian Hidayat	Demokrat; PKB; PPP
3	Isran Noor	Regent of East Kutai (2009-2015)	Hadi Mulyadi	Gerindra; PKS; PAN
4	Rusmadi	Provincial secretary of East Kalimantan	Safaruddin	PDI-P; Hanura

Two-term former Bontang mayor Andi Sofyan Hasdam ran with the backing of Golkar and Nasdem. Hasdam initially ran with Nasdem member Nusyirwan Ismail, but the latter passed away before the election and was replaced by Rizal Effendi, Balikpapan mayor.

Another mayor, Syaharie Ja'ang of Samarinda, also ran in the election with the support of Demokrat, PPP and PKB. His running mate Awang Ferdian Hidayat was a People's Representative Council member from PDI-P.

Former regent of East Kutai, Isran Noor, received the backing of Gerindra, PAN, and PKS. He ran with PKS People's Representative Council member Hadi Mulyadi.

PDI-P and Hanura supported Rusmadi Wongso-Safaruddin, who were the provincial secretary and a police inspector general, respectively.

== Results ==
Area	Andi-Rizal		Syaharie-Awang		Isran-Hadi		Rusmadi-Safaruddin	
Area	Votes	%	Votes	%	Votes	%	Votes	%
Kutai Kartanegara	58,007	21.36	59,736	22.0	96,045	35.37	57,729	21.26
West Kutai	3,198	5.02	25,992	40.78	9,891	15.52	24,657	38.68
Berau	13,060	17.2	23,476	30.92	23,650	31.15	15,738	20.73
Bontang	26,882	41.19	5,864	8.98	19,423	29.76	13,097	20.07
Mahakam Ulu	404	2.99	7,434	55.05	2,748	20.35	2,917	21.6
East Kutai	17,254	17.09	32,464	32.15	30,949	30.65	20,296	20.1
Balikpapan	82,488	32.13	22,115	8.61	68,647	26.74	83,491	32.52
Paser	20,716	22.55	24,257	26.4	29,715	32.34	17,185	18.71
Samarinda	43,575	13.95	81,741	26.16	113,372	36.29	73,746	23.6
Penajam North Paser	22,582	27.83	19,908	24.54	23,271	28.68	15,370	18.94
Total	288,166	21.62	302,987	22.73	417,711	31.33	324,226	24.32
