= 2024 East Kalimantan gubernatorial election =

- 27 November 2024
- Turnout: 66.72% (▲8.56pp)
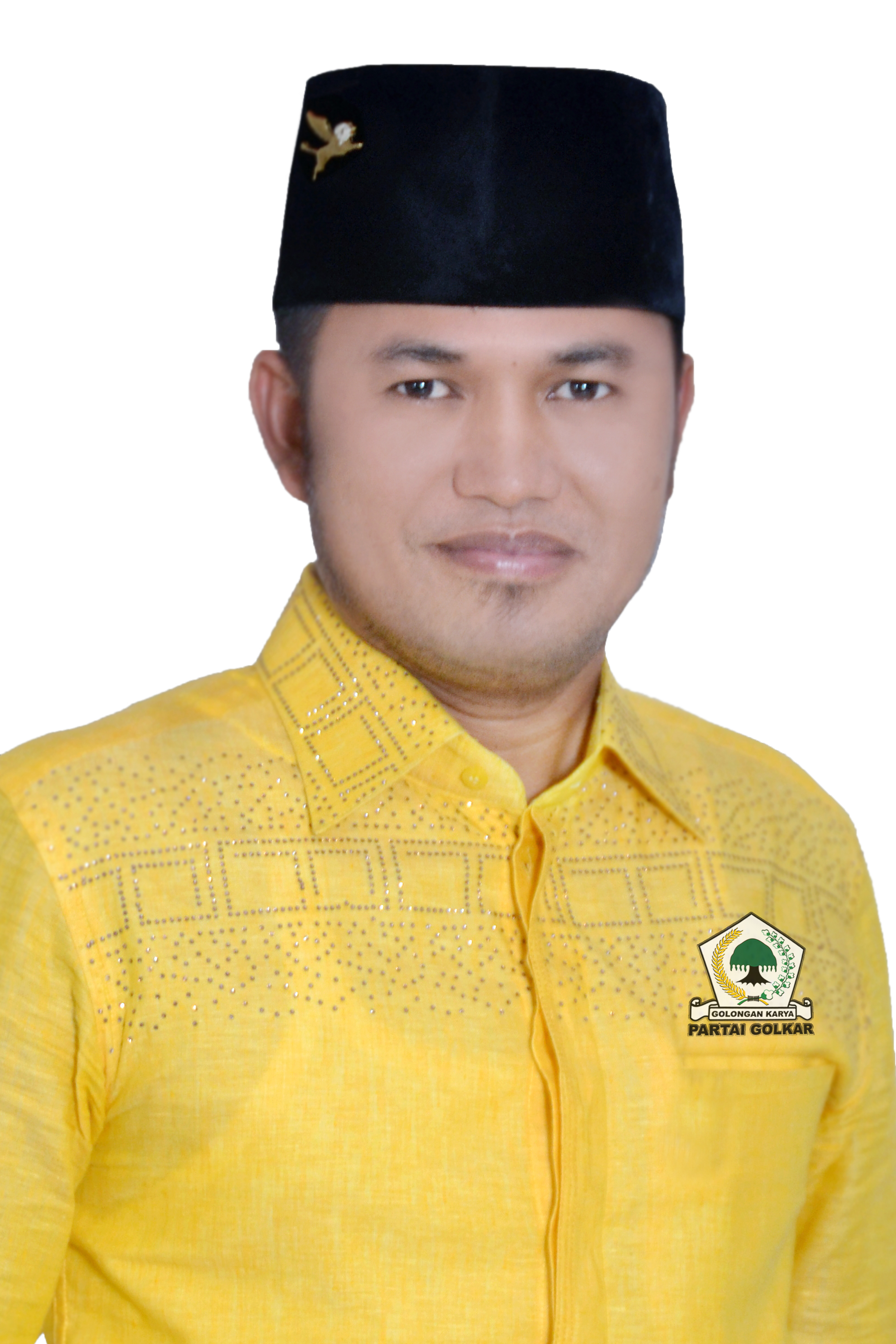

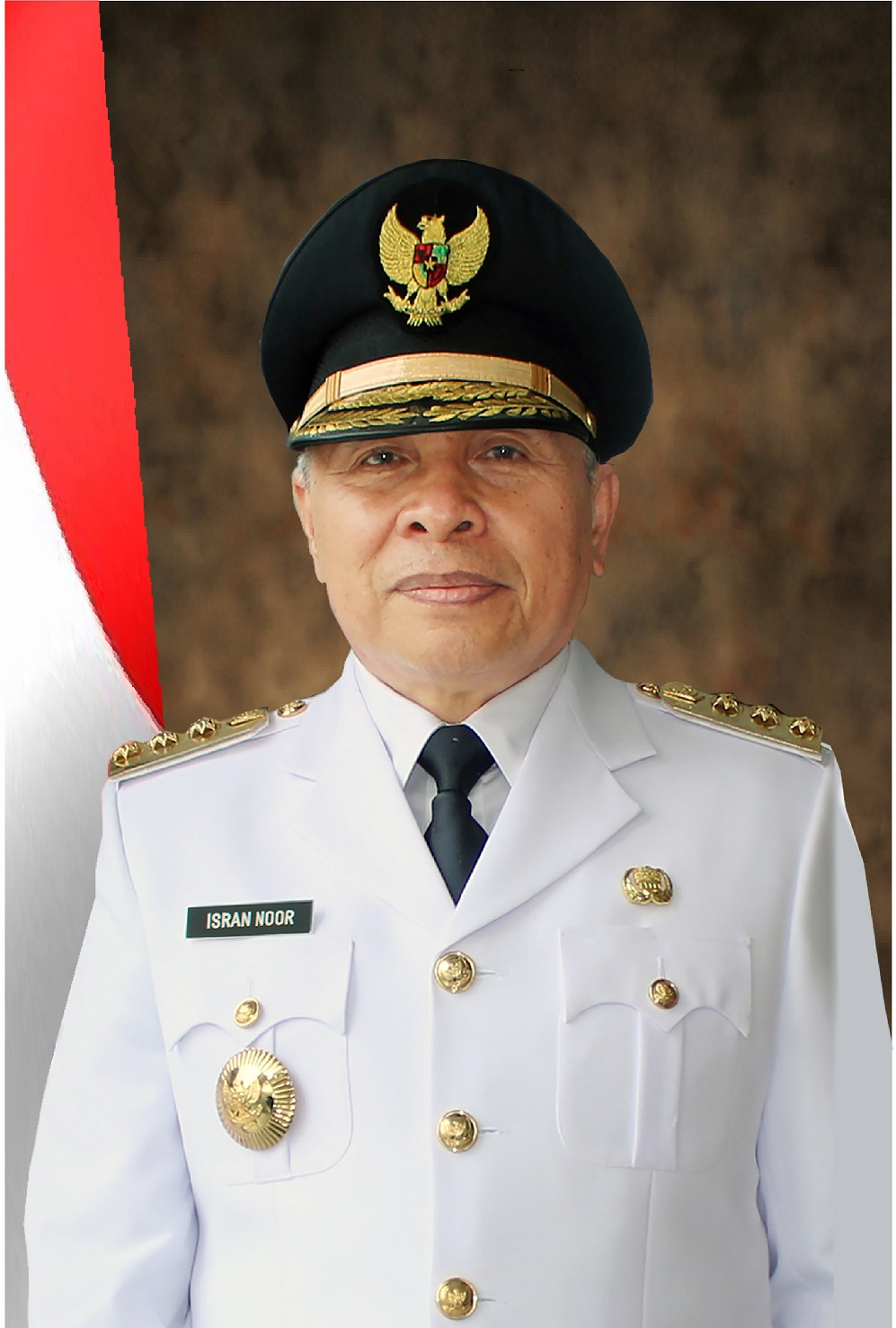
Candidate	Rudy Mas'ud	Isran Noor
Party	Golkar	Demokrat
Alliance	KIM Plus	–
Running mate	Seno Aji	Hadi Mulyadi
Popular vote	996,399	793,793
Percentage	55.66%	44.34%
- Results map by district
Governor before election
Akmal Malik (acting)
Independent
Elected Governor
Rudy Mas'ud
Golkar

The 2024 East Kalimantan gubernatorial election was held on 27 November 2024 as part of nationwide local elections to elect the governor and vice governor of East Kalimantan for a five-year term. The previous election was held in 2018. Former member of the House of Representatives, Rudy Mas'ud of Golkar, won the election with 55% of the vote. He defeated former Governor Isran Noor of the Democratic Party, who received 44%.

== Electoral system ==
The election, like other local elections in 2024, follow the first-past-the-post system where the candidate with the most votes wins the election, even if they do not win a majority. It is possible for a candidate to run uncontested, in which case the candidate is still required to win a majority of votes "against" an "empty box" option. Should the candidate fail to do so, the election will be repeated on a later date.

== Candidates ==
According to electoral regulations, in order to qualify for the election, candidates were required to secure support from a political party or a coalition of parties controlling 11 seats (20 percent of all seats) in the East Kalimantan Regional House of Representatives (DPRD). The Golkar party, which won 15 of 55 seats in the 2024 legislative election, is the only party eligible to nominate a candidate without forming a coalition with other parties. However, following a Constitutional Court of Indonesia decision in August 2024, the political support required to nominate a candidate was lowered to between 6.5 and 10 percent of the popular vote. Candidates may alternatively demonstrate support to run as an independent in form of photocopies of identity cards, which in East Kalimantan's case corresponds to 236,185 copies. No independent candidates registered with the General Elections Commission (KPU) prior to the set deadline.

=== Potential ===
The following are individuals who have either been publicly mentioned as a potential candidate by a political party in the DPRD, publicly declared their candidacy with press coverage, or considered as a potential candidate by media outlets:

- Isran Noor (Demokrat), previous governor (2018–2023).

- Hadi Mulyadi (Gelora), previous vice governor (2018–2023; as running mate).

- Rudy Mas'ud (Golkar), member of the House of Representatives.
- Mahyudin, deputy speaker of the Regional Representative Council.

== Political map ==
Following the 2024 Indonesian legislative election, nine political parties are represented in the East Kalimantan DPRD:

Political parties	Seat count
Party of Functional Groups (Golkar)	15 / 55
Great Indonesia Movement Party (Gerindra)	10 / 55
Indonesian Democratic Party of Struggle (PDI-P)	9 / 55
National Awakening Party (PKB)	6 / 55
National Mandate Party (PAN)	4 / 55
Prosperous Justice Party (PKS)	4 / 55
NasDem Party	3 / 55
Democratic Party (Demokrat)	2 / 55
United Development Party (PPP)	2 / 55

== Results ==
Candidate	Running mate	Party	Votes	%
Rudy Mas'ud	Seno Aji	Golkar	996,399	55.66
Isran Noor	Hadi Mulyadi	Democratic Party	793,793	44.34
Total			1,790,192	100.00
Valid votes			1,790,192	95.10
Invalid votes			92,199	4.90
Total votes			1,882,391	100.00
Registered voters/turnout			2,821,202	66.72
Source: KPU Kalimantan Timur
