= Governor of East Kalimantan =

Head executive of East Kalimantan

- Coat of arms of East Kalimantan

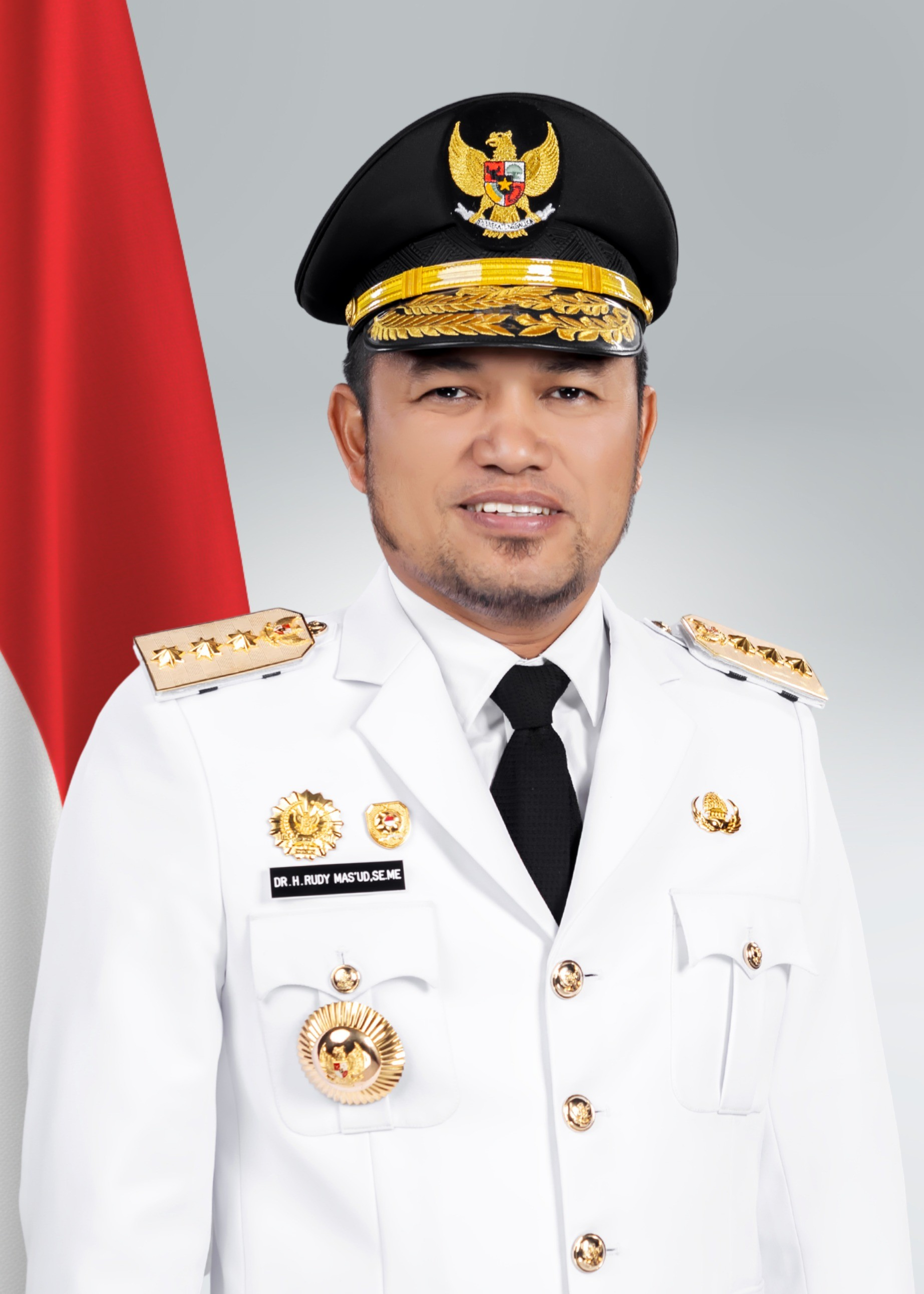
- Incumbent; Rudy Mas'ud since 20 February 2025
- Term length: Five years, two terms
- Inaugural holder: A.P.T. Pranoto
- Formation: 1957
- Deputy: Vice Governor
- Salary: Rp3 million (since 2000)
- Website: kaltimprov.go.id

The Governor of East Kalimantan is the executive head of the Indonesian province of East Kalimantan. The current officeholder is Rudy Mas'ud since 20 February 2025.

== List of governors ==
This is a list of governors since the province's creation in 1957.

#	Portrait	Name	Took office	Left office	Term	Note	Vice Governor
1		A.P.T. Pranoto	1957	1959	1		
2		Inche Abdoel Moeis	3 March 1959	27 May 1959	2		
(1)		A.P.T. Pranoto	1959	1961	3	(Note: In 1961, he was dismissed for being held in Jakarta on charges of corruption)	
—		Prodjosoemarto	1961	1962	3	(Note: Resident helper(now acting) in 8 months)	
3		Abdoel Moeis Hassan	10 August 1962	14 September 1966	4		
4		Soekadio	1966	1967	5		
5		Abdoel Wahab Sjahranie	1967	1978	6		
5		Abdoel Wahab Sjahranie	1967	1978	7		
6		Erry Soepardjan	22 May 1978	5 June 1983	8		
7		Soewandi Roestam	7 June 1983	25 June 1988	9		Muhammad Ardans
8		Muhammad Ardans	25 June 1988	25 June 1993	10		Harsono
8		Muhammad Ardans	25 June 1993	25 June 1998	11		Suwarna Abdul Fatah
9		Suwarna Abdul Fatah	1998	2003	12	(Note: In 2006 was dismissed due to a corruption case)	Chaidir Hafidz
9		Suwarna Abdul Fatah	2003	2006	13		Yurnalis Ngayoh
—		Yurnalis Ngayoh	8 December 2006	10 March 2008	13	(Note: Previously, he was deputy governor until in 2006 he became Acting Governor, replacing Suwarna A.F. who were arrested for corruption cases. Then, on March 10, 2008 Yurnalis Ngayoh was appointed Governor of East Kalimantan until December 2008)	—
10		Yurnalis Ngayoh	10 March 2008	25 June 2008	13		—
—		Syaiful Teteng (Daily acting)	25 June 2008	3 July 2008	—		—
—		Tarmizi Abdul Karim (Acting)	3 July 2008	17 December 2008	—	(Note: As Acting Governor of East Kalimantan because the East Kalimantan 2008 Governor Election lasted two rounds so the new governor could not be sworn in, which was planned in July 2008 to be December 2008 after the East Kalimantan Election 2008 was completed)	—
11		Awang Faroek Ishak	17 December 2008	17 December 2013	14		Farid Wadjdy
11		Awang Faroek Ishak	17 December 2013	20 September 2018	15	(Note: Resigned for running for Indonesian legislative elections 2019)	Mukmin Faisyal
—		Meiliana (Daily Acting)	20 September 2018	22 September 2018	15		—
—		Restuardy Daud (Acting)	22 September 2018	1 October 2018	15		—
12		Isran Noor	1 October 2018	1 October 2023	16		Hadi Mulyadi
—		Akmal Malik (Acting)	1 October 2023	20 February 2025			
13		Rudy Mas'ud	20 February 2025	Incumbent	17		Seno Aji
