= Public broadcasting in Indonesia =

Public Broadcasting Institutions in Indonesia (Indonesian: Lembaga Penyiaran Publik, abbreviated as LPP) currently consists of three separate entities: Radio Republik Indonesia (RRI), Televisi Republik Indonesia (TVRI), and Local Public Broadcasting Institutions (Lembaga Penyiaran Publik Lokal or LPPL). This classification is based on Act No. 32 of 2002 on Broadcasting (Undang-Undang Nomor 32 Tahun 2002 tentang Penyiaran), followed by Government Regulation No. 11 of 2005 on the Broadcasting Provision of Public Broadcasting Institutions (Peraturan Pemerintah Nomor 11 Tahun 2005 tentang Penyelenggaraan Penyiaran Lembaga Penyiaran Publik).

According to Act No. 32 of 2002, a "public broadcasting institution" is defined as a "legal entity established by the state; independent, neutral, not commercial; and function to provide services for the public benefit."

Funding for broadcasters, as stated in Act No. 32 of 2002, comes from several sources, including broadcasting fees, the annual state budget, community contributions, advertisements, and other legal efforts related to their broadcasting operations. While the annual budget appropriation for RRI and TVRI is approved by the national government and parliament (DPR), the annual budget for LPPL is approved by the respective local government and local parliament. Funding sources for RRI and TVRI outside the annual budget are currently classified as "non-tax state revenue" and are regulated by government regulations.

== National broadcasters ==
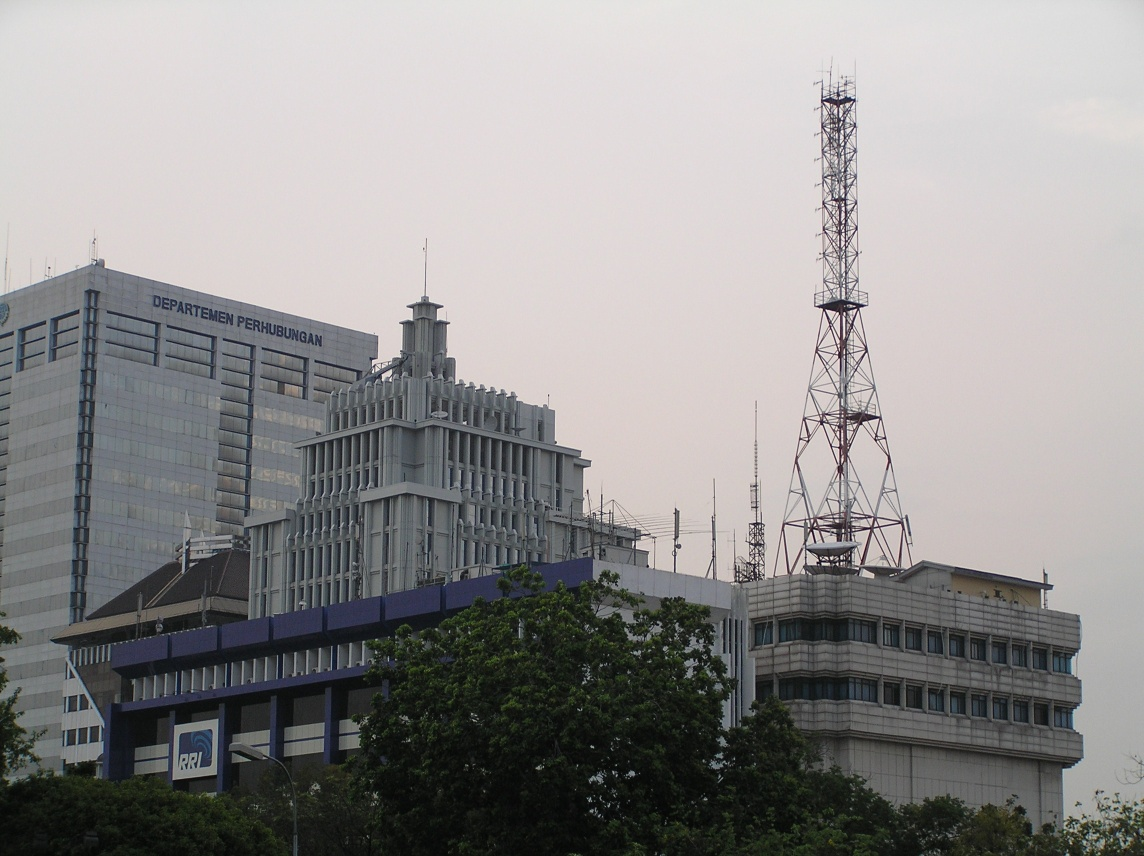
RRI national headquarters in Jakarta.

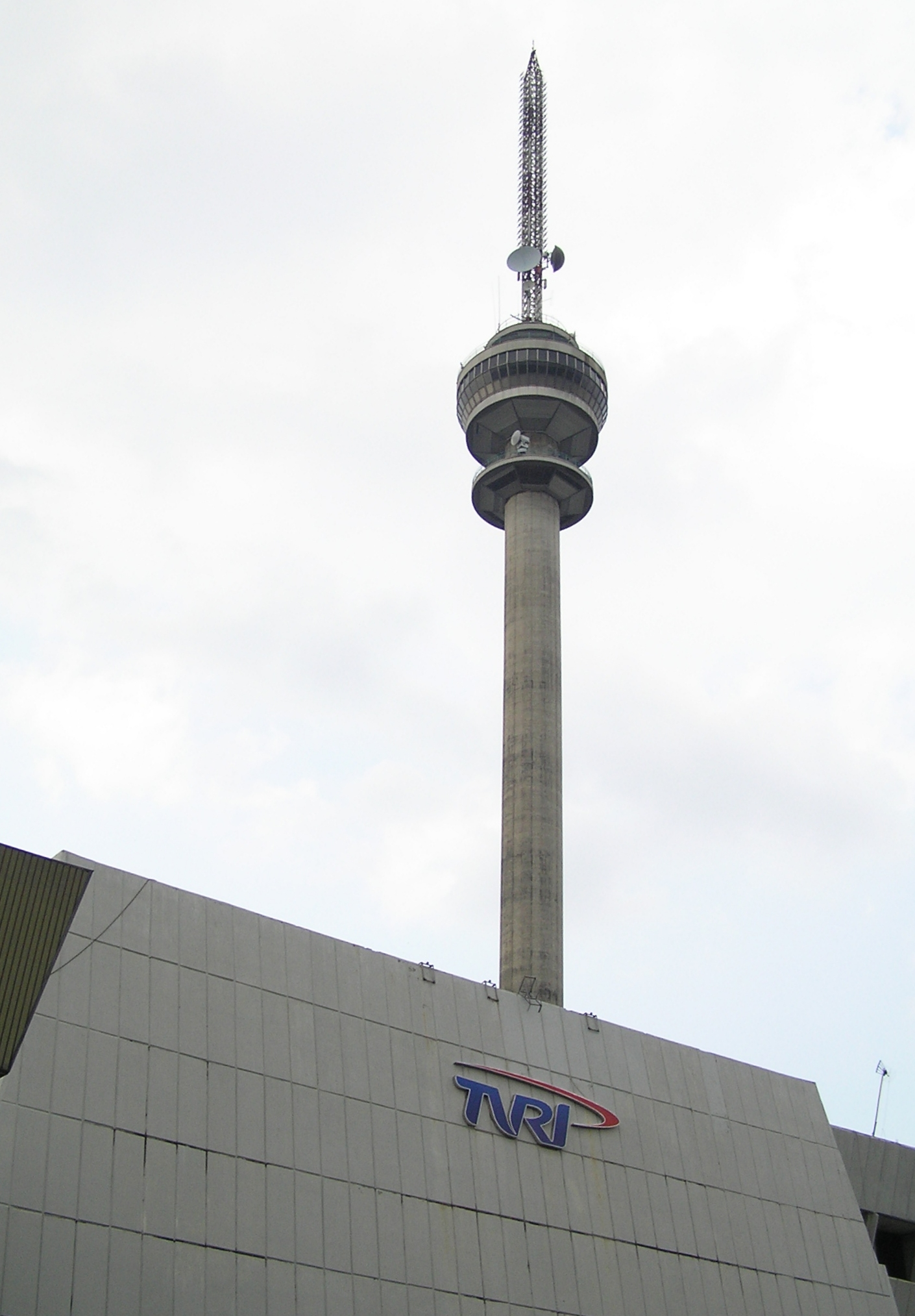
TVRI national headquarters in Jakarta.

The national-scale public broadcasters are RRI, the national radio network, and TVRI, the national television network.

RRI and TVRI were initially established as corporations separate from the central government but were later incorporated into the Department of Information (Departemen Penerangan) in 1946 and 1975, respectively. Concerns about repositioning RRI and TVRI as public broadcasters grew after the Reformation period. These concerns culminated in 2000, during Abdurrahman Wahid's administration, when the Department of Information was dissolved. This led to RRI and TVRI being gradually removed from direct government control. (The department was later reestablished as the Ministry of Communication and Informatics).

In the same year, RRI and TVRI were restructured as service corporations (Perusahaan Jawatan or Perjan) under the Ministry of Finance. TVRI was subsequently reorganized as a state-owned enterprise in 2002, and both broadcasters officially became independent public service broadcasters in 2005.

- RRI was established on 11 September 1945. It currently operates four radio networks: RRI Pro 1, RRI Pro 2, RRI Pro 3, and RRI Pro 4, which are carried by some or all of its almost 100 local stations (including small-scale stations). RRI Pro 3 functions as a centralized programming network. Additionally, RRI operates an international radio service, Voice of Indonesia.
- TVRI began public broadcasts on 24 August 1962, coinciding with the opening day of the 1962 Asian Games, following a trial broadcast during the 1962 Indonesian Independence Day celebrations. TVRI currently operates three national television channels—TVRI, TVRI World, and TVRI Sport—as well as 35 regional stations across the country.

A proposed new broadcasting act currently under development aims to merge RRI and TVRI into a single entity called RTRI (Radio Televisi Republik Indonesia or Radio Television of the Republic of Indonesia).

== Local broadcasters ==
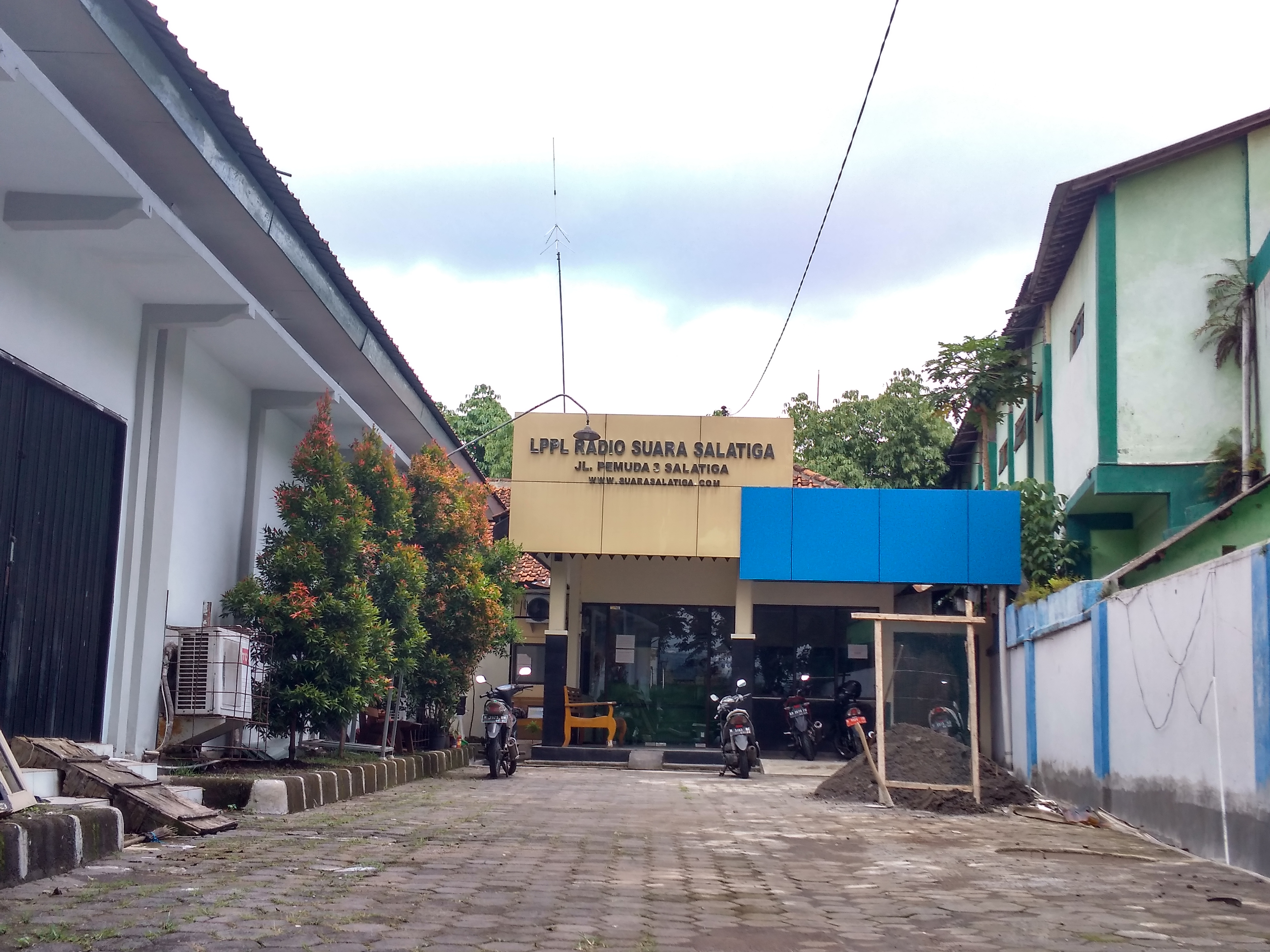
LPPL Radio Suara Salatiga, a local public radio station in Salatiga, Central Java.

Local public broadcasting institutions (LPPL) refer to local public broadcasters that are not owned or operated by RRI or TVRI. These broadcasters are sometimes, but not always, located in cities, regencies, or provinces without an existing RRI or TVRI station. According to Government Regulation No. 11 of 2005, LPPL broadcasters are required to network with RRI (for radio stations) and TVRI (for television stations).

Before the Reformation, several radio stations were owned and operated by city or regency governments. These stations were known as Local Government Broadcast Radio (Radio Siaran Pemerintah Daerah or RSPD). Examples include RSPD Top FM in Sukoharjo, Central Java, which began broadcasting in 1968, and RSPD Berau in Berau, East Kalimantan, which first aired in 1975.

There were no local government-owned television stations at the time, as all government-owned television operations, including local stations (typically located in provincial capitals), were managed by TVRI. Act No. 32 of 2002 introduced the term "local public broadcasting institutions," aiming to transform local government media into public broadcasters. This transformation was later regulated by Government Regulation No. 11 of 2005.

Currently, there are several local public broadcaster unions in the country, such as the All-Indonesia Radio and Television LPPL Association (Asosiasi LPPL Radio dan Televisi Se-Indonesia), which was formed in 2018, and the Indonesian Local Public Radio and TV Association (Persatuan Radio TV Publik Daerah se-Indonesia), branded as Persada.id or Indonesiapersada.id, which was formed in 2019.

Few local public broadcasters in the country, such as TV Kutim, previously operated under another legal entity type known as Technical Implementer Unit (UPT), but it has since closed down due to its own legality issues.

== Criticism ==
Apni Jaya Putra, a former director of news and programming at TVRI, stated that the "public broadcasting institution" status is not recognized within the Indonesian state-established agency structure. The closest equivalent to this status is the "public service agency" (badan layanan umum or BLU), however the BLUs are usually under the auspices of a government ministry instead of an independent agency.

== See also ==
- Media in Indonesia
