= TV Kutim =

Indonesian television channel

UPTD TV Kutim
- Country: Indonesia
- Broadcast area: Sangatta
- Headquarters: Sangatta, Indonesia

Programming
- Language: Indonesian

Ownership
- Owner: East Kutai Regency

History
- Launched: 2003; 23 years ago (first iteration); 13 April 2016; 10 years ago (second iteration)
- Closed: 2014 (first iteration); November 2016 (second iteration)

Links
- Website: Pre-2014 website

UPTD or UPT Televisi Kutai Timur (Note: UPTD or UPT as a type of entity stands for [Regional] Technical Implementer Unit (Indonesian: Unit Pelaksana Teknis [Daerah]).), better known as TV Kutim (Indonesian pronunciation: [ˈtifi ˈkutɪm]), was an Indonesian television station operated by the local government of East Kutai Regency. Operating from their own headquarters located behind the office of East Kutai regent, its broadcast coverage had been always historically restricted into the town of Sangatta in East Kalimantan.

TV Kutim was established in 2003 by the regent of East Kutai at the time, Awang Faroek Ishak and stopped broadcasting in late 2014 to make room for mass-scale changes. The channel's activities were then resumed in 2016 only for several months, and it closed in November due to the airing of pornographic content and the lack of required legalities.

== History ==
TV Kutim was a local public broadcasting service (LPPL) founded in 2003 by the government of East Kutai and its launch was inaugurated by its first regent Awang Faroek Ishak. Soon after their launch, they organised a presenter debut contest and initiated a cooperation with Publik Khatulistiwa TV (PKTV) from Bontang to ripen the quality of their own crews. The first iteration of TV Kutim stopped broadcasting in late 2014, and it was subsequently followed by massive-scale improvements. The channel had migrated from analog into digital technology and received one unit of production truck, while the electrical capacity of its transmitter was increased from 500 watts to 10,000 watts.

In preparation for the resumption of TV Kutim, the local government of East Kutai allocated funds for TV Kutim in 2015, ranging from IDR 9 billion to 10 billion, way larger than the allocations for other local entities such as the Regional Library and Archiving Agency. Chairman of Transportation, Communication, and Informatics Service, Johansyah Ibrahim, admitted that an attempt to establish a cooperation with TVRI East Kalimantan had been failed. Instead, they would cooperate with around 30 entrepeneurs from the cable television businesses in North Sangatta and South Sangatta by giving away set-top boxes and antennas two months ahead from its relaunch date through the chairman of Cable Television Association of Sangatta. On 13 April 2016, TV Kutim finally resumed their activities as test broadcasts in the Rainbow Hill (Bukit Pelangi) area, and they initially aired only 5 news per day, aside from talk shows. It was expected that TV Kutim could expand their reach into all over Sangatta.

Unfortunately, the channel's existence did not last for very long time, after it caught airing an uncensored version of Gods of Egypt in November 2016, sparking outrage throughout East Kutai since the film itself features semi-pornographic scenes. This controversy attracted multiple reactions from the locals. The chairman of Muslim Students' Association branch in East Kutai, Alpian Sinu viewed the incident as incompatible with East Kutai's cultural values. Meanwhile, the chairman of Penjara NGO branch in East Kutai, Supiansyah, called for a direct apology from the board besides recommending for innovation in the television sector.

The chairman of TV Kutim, Dia Budi along with its other crews finally made an apology regarding to this controversy, and claimed that the incident happened due to negligence. But not long after, the regional branch of Indonesian Broadcasting Commission (KPID) in East Kalimantan organised a plenary meeting on 23 November 2016 and decided that TV Kutim had to cease broadcasts. They cited that this channel had been operating illegally without either a permit or a regent's regulation, aside from the failures on censorship of pornographic content, resulting in breaches of Law No 32/2002 on Broadcasting.

In 2017, the application to establish TV Kutim as a Technical Implementer Unit (UPT) was rejected by the provincial government of East Kalimantan, unlike the other 93 entities, ultimately due to lack of numerous operational permits. Whether TV Kutim could resume their broadcasts, its existence now requires new permits, including a regional regulation. The East Kutai government was securing all assets of former TV Kutim which amounted up to dozens of billions of rupiahs, while civil servant staffs and regional workforce under contract had to be returned into the local Communication and Informatics, Cryptography, and Statistics Service (Diskominfo). The regent of East Kutai at the time, Ismunandar decided not to reestablish the legal unit of TV Kutim in 2017, since he judged the channel's management as "unprofessional" as evident from the pornography controversy last year.

Since its closure, there have been demands from several local government elites to resume the business activities of TV Kutim, such as from the chairman of Diskominfo East Kutai, Ery Mulyadi in 2021, and the acting regent of East Kutai, Agus Hari Kesuma in 2024. Despite the existence of Regional Regulation Number 3 of 2018 regarding the local public broadcasting system within the regency, with its legal name is being changed to LPPL TV Kutai Timur, this channel's return has not been materialised until this day.

== Visual identity ==
=== Logos ===
External videos
- TV Kutim's ident from 2003–2014
- TV Kutim's last ident from 2016

TV Kutim logo before 2014

The earliest logo of TV Kutim as its first iteration much resembled the 2001 logo of Trans TV. It consisted of a larger ligature formed out from the individual letters "T" and "V", squeezed by smaller inscriptions in upper case "KU" and "IM" to the left and right. Both logos have shared blue tints, but unlike Trans TV, the ligature did not form a rhombus, but rather a downward arrow. Meanwhile, its station identification consisted of a slide show of TV Kutim's logo in 3D rotating counterclockwise on a spiral against a colour-changing background and the lightnings. However, its on-air bug sometime in the 2000s only consisted of an uppercase inscription "TV KUTIM" against a blue background.

As the channel reestablished itself in 2016, TV Kutim did also change its logo in a very drastic way. It featured a large inscription in the lower case "tv" against a map highlighting the location of East Kutai inside the Borneo island, and another smaller upper-case italic inscription "KUTIM" to the right. This logo had multiple colours: the "tv" inscription had a red tint with white shadows and traditional Dayak ornaments on itself, the Borneo map was in yellow with pale pink portions for pre-2012 East Kalimantan and purple for East Kutai, and the "KUTIM" inscription was in white. Their latest ident in 2016 featured scenes of agriculture, fishing economy, and the urban life in Sangatta within a minute, and only two people were officially named as the creators of this ident: "Fandy" and "Dhuro".

=== Slogans ===
- Wada' .... leh (2003–2014)
- TV-nya orang Kutim
- Gerbang Desa Madu (Note: This is an abbreviation for the Independent and Integrated Village Development Movement, a program instituted by the government of East Kutai under its former regent Ismunandar.) (2016)

== See also ==
- Publik Khatulistiwa TV
- Samarinda TV
