= Rudy Mas'ud =

Indonesian politician (born 1981)

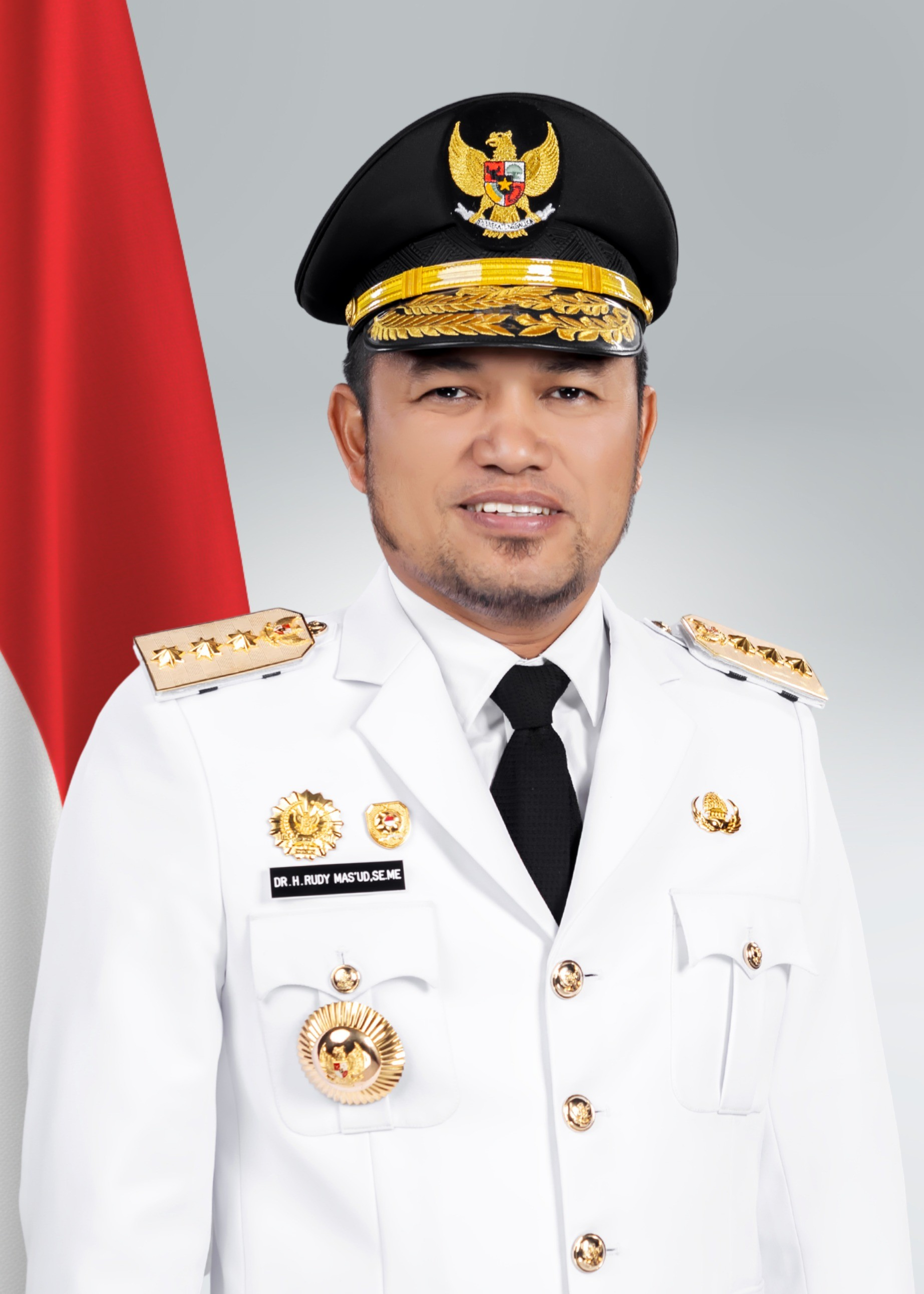
- Rudy Mas'ud in 2025

Governor of East Kalimantan
- Incumbent
- Assumed office 20 February 2025
- Deputy: Seno Aji
- Preceded by: Isran Noor; Akmal Malik (act.)

Member of the House of Representatives
- In office 1 October 2019 – 24 September 2024
- Constituency: East Kalimantan

Personal details
- Born: 7 December 1981 (age 44) Balikpapan, East Kalimantan, Indonesia
- Party: Golkar
- Spouse: Sarifah Suraidah
- Children: 13
- Relatives: Rahmad Mas'ud (brother); Abdul Gafur Mas'ud (brother)
- Occupation: Businessman; politician

Rudy Mas'ud (born 7 December 1981) is an Indonesian politician serving as governor of East Kalimantan since 2025. From 2019 to 2024, he was a member of the House of Representatives.

Following his controversial remarks, Rudy is facing protests demanding his resignation on 21 April 2026.
