= Norbaiti Isran Noor =

Indonesian politician (1969–2023)

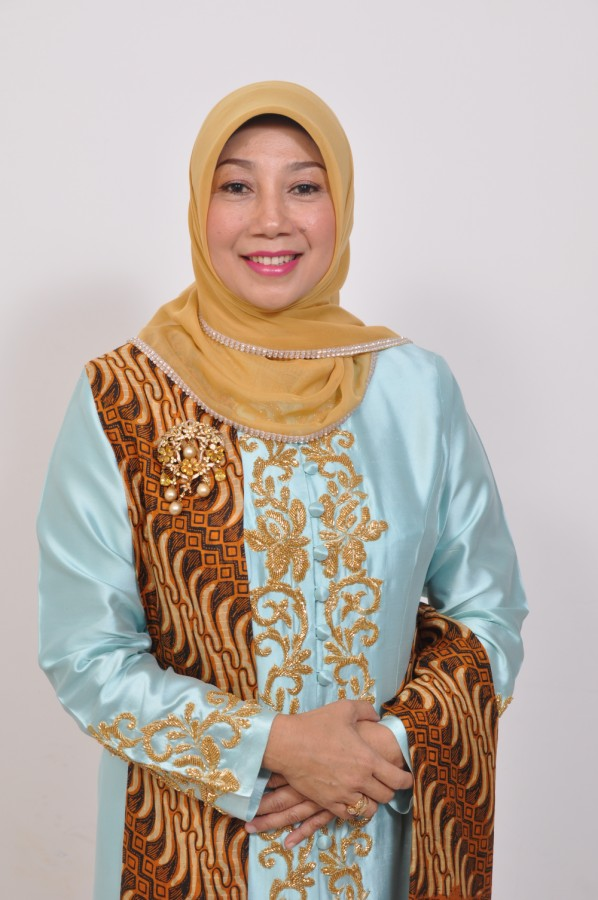
- Noor in 2023

Member of the People's Representative Council
- In office 15 January 2014 – 15 December 2015
- Preceded by: Yusran Aspar
- Succeeded by: Adji Farida Padmo Ardans

Personal details
- Born: 30 January 1969 Loa Janan, East Kalimantan, Indonesia
- Died: 24 May 2023 (aged 54) Jakarta, Indonesia
- Party: PAN (from 2018)
- Other political affiliations: Democratic Party (2009–2018)
- Spouse: Isran Noor (m. 1991)
- Children: 3
- Education: Mulawarman University (A.Md.)

Norbaiti Isran Noor (30 January 1969 – 24 May 2023) was an Indonesian politician who served as a member of the People's Representative Council from 2014 until 2015. She was the wife of the incumbent governor of East Kalimantan, Isran Noor.

== Early life and education ==
Norbaiti Isran Noor was born on 30 January 1969 in Loa Janan, a small town in East Kalimantan, as the daughter of Amlan bin Tasin and Mastika. She was the first of four children of her parents.

Upon completing her high school education in Samarinda in 1988, Noor studied English literature at the Mulawarman University. She graduated in 1990 with an associate degree.

== Personal life and career ==
After finishing higher education, on 15 March 1991 Norbaiti married Isran Noor. At that time, Mr. Noor was working as a civil servant at the East Kalimantan's governor office. Norbaiti then joined Dharma Wanita, a social organization for the wives of civil servants. The couple had three children from the marriage.

In the 2009 Indonesian legislative election, Noor was nominated by the Democratic Party as a candidate for the People's Representative Council from the East Kalimantan constituency. She failed to secure a seat in the council, but was later called to replace Democratic Party MP Yusran Aspar, who had to resign as MP in order to run in East Kalimantan local elections. She was installed on 15 January 2014. During her first term, which lasted less than a year, Noor was assigned to Commission X of the People's Representative Council, which handles matters relating to education, sports, and history.

Noor decided to run for a second term in the 2014 Indonesian legislative election. She was re-elected in the election with 53,283 votes. She, alongside Mahyudin from East Kutai, were the only MPs from East Kalimantan who were re-elected. In her second term, Noor was assigned to Commission VII, which handles matters relating to energy, research, technology, and environment.

Less than a year into her term as a member of the People's Representative Council, Noor decided to run as a candidate for the Regent of East Kutai. Her husband, who at that time was holding the position, resigned from the position prematurely. He stated that his resignation had nothing to do with his wife's candidacy and that he wanted to have a break from politics. Isran was later replaced by his deputy, Ardiansyah Sulaiman, on 9 June 2015.

Noor resigned from her seat in the People's Representative Council on 15 December 2015 in order to become a candidate in the East Kutai election. She had to face her husband's subordinates in the election: Isran Noor's deputy Ardiansyah Sulaiman and Isran Noor's regional secretary Ismunandar. Noor, who obtained only a minuscule share of votes, lost the election to Ismunandar.

In July 2018, Noor announced her intention to run again as a candidate for the People's Representative Council from the National Mandate Party. Noor secured her nomination, but the party failed to gain a majority of votes in her constituency.

== Death ==
Norbaiti Isran Noor died on the night of 24 May 2023 at the National Brain Hospital in Jakarta due to brain cancer. She was 54. Noor had suffered from the disease for a prolonged period and had undergone chemotherapy several times. Prior to her death, Noor went into a coma for three days. Noor was buried at the backyard of her house in East Kalimantan.
