= Yurnalis Ngayoh =

Indonesian civil servant (1942–2021)

Petrus Kanisius Yuvenalis Yurnalis Ngayoh
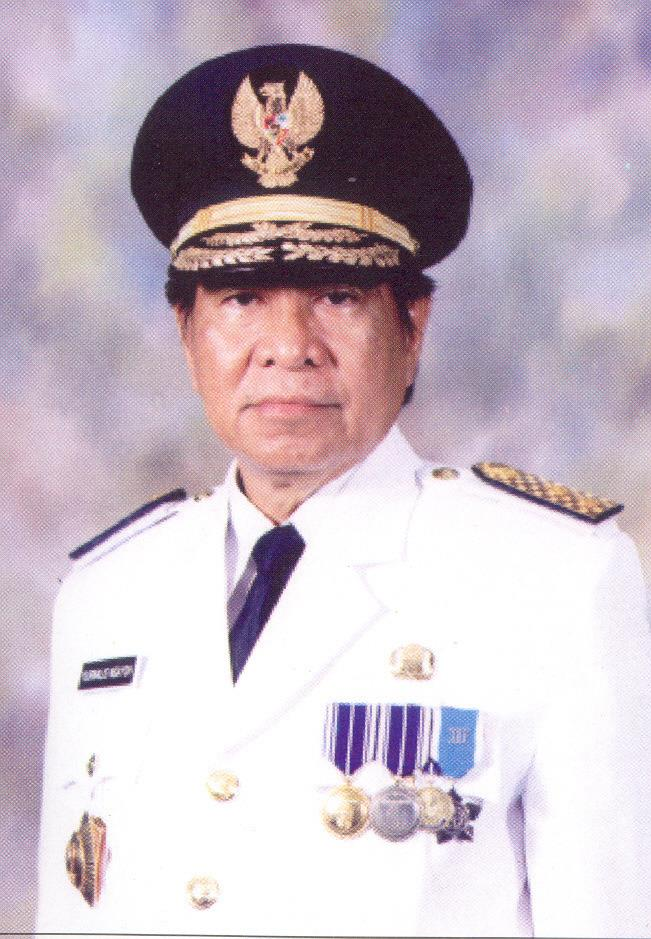

Governor of East Kalimantan
- In office 8 December 2006 – 25 June 2008; Acting until 10 March 2008
- President: Susilo Bambang Yudhoyono
- Preceded by: Suwarna Abdul Fatah
- Succeeded by: Syaiful Teteng (acting); Tarmizi Abdul Karim (acting); Awang Faroek Ishak

Vice Governor of East Kalimantan
- In office 1999 – 8 December 2006 Serving with Chaidir Hafidz (until 2003)
- Governor: Suwarna Abdul Fatah
- Preceded by: Chaidir Hafidz
- Succeeded by: Farid Wadjdy

Personal details
- Born: Yurnalis Ngayoh; 20 August 1942 Barong Tongkok, West Kutai, Kalimantan, Japanese Dutch East Indies
- Died: 8 February 2021 (aged 78) Samarinda, East Kalimantan, Indonesia

Petrus Kanisius Yuvenalis Yurnalis Ngayoh (20 August 1942 – 8 February 2021) was an Indonesian bureaucrat and politician. He was the Vice Governor of East Kalimantan from 2003 until 2006 and the Governor of East Kalimantan from 2006 until 2008 and was the first Dayak as well as Roman Catholic governor of East Kalimantan.

== Early life and education ==
Yurnalis Ngayoh was born on 20 August 1942 at a small village in Barong Tongkok, West Kutai. His father was a high-ranking official in the village. At the age of six, his father enrolled him at a Catholic school owned by People's Education, Teaching, and Development Foundation. Before he studied in the school, he had to pass an entrance examination, which is to cross his arm above his head until one of his fingers reached his ear. Ngayoh succeeded in the examination and he began studying in the school on 2 August 1948.

While he was in the fourth grade, a teacher closely related to his family approached him and offered to baptize him. The teacher asked Ngayoh if he wanted to take Yurnalis as his baptismal name. Ngayoh nodded although he did not know the meaning of Yurnalis.

Although his father was not a Catholic, his father allowed him to be baptized as a Catholic. Ngayoh was baptized with his full baptismal name of Petrus Kanisius Yuvenalis Yurnalis Ngayoh. His baptismal or Christian name was taken from the saint Peter Canisius and the poet Juvenalis. He later used Yurnalis Ngayoh as his common full name.

Ngayoh graduated from the school after finishing the final exam in 1955. He was then enlisted by his father to attend a junior high school in Samarinda. During his study in Samarinda, he lived in a dilapidated presbyter owned by a pastor and a monseigneur. Ngayoh studied in the junior high school until 1958 and continued to learn at the Samarinda High School. After he graduated from the high school in 1961, he then moved to Yogyakarta and enrolled at the Gadjah Mada University. He graduated from the university in 1968 with a degree in economic studies (S.E.).

During his term as vice governor, Ngayoh pursued a master's degree in management at the Wijaya Putra University in Surabaya. After finishing his studies in the university, he pursued a doctor of management degree at the 17 August University and graduated with the degree in 2010.

== Career ==
Ngayoh began his career as a bureaucrat in the Department of Internal Affairs. Ngayoh became the treasurer of the Institute of Governance of Home Affairs in 1969 and was promoted three years later to become the Assistant III to the director of the institute until 1975. He was then transferred to his home province, where he became the regional secretary of the Paser Regency from 1975 until 1980 and regional secretary of the Tenggarong Regency from 1980 until 1987.

After serving in regencial government for twelve years, Ngayoh was promoted as the Assistant to the Governor of East Kalimantan for the Southern Territory. During this period, Ngayoh was one of the few Dayaks who could hold high positions in the government. Ngayoh was then appointed the Chairman of the LP2SM Daya Sejahtera (Lembaga Pembinaan dan Pengembangan Swadaya Masyarakat Daya Sejahtera), an organization aiming to improve the standard of living of the Dayak people.

Ngayoh ran as a candidate for the Governor of East Kalimantan in the 1993 East Kalimantan gubernatorial election. The election, in which only members of the East Kalimantan Regional People's Representative Council could vote, was won by Muhammad Ardans with 36 votes. Ngayoh only gained four votes in the election. Ngayoh was later dismissed from his office and transferred to the regional secretary. He became the assistant for public administration and assistant for development administration.

== Vice Governor of East Kalimantan ==
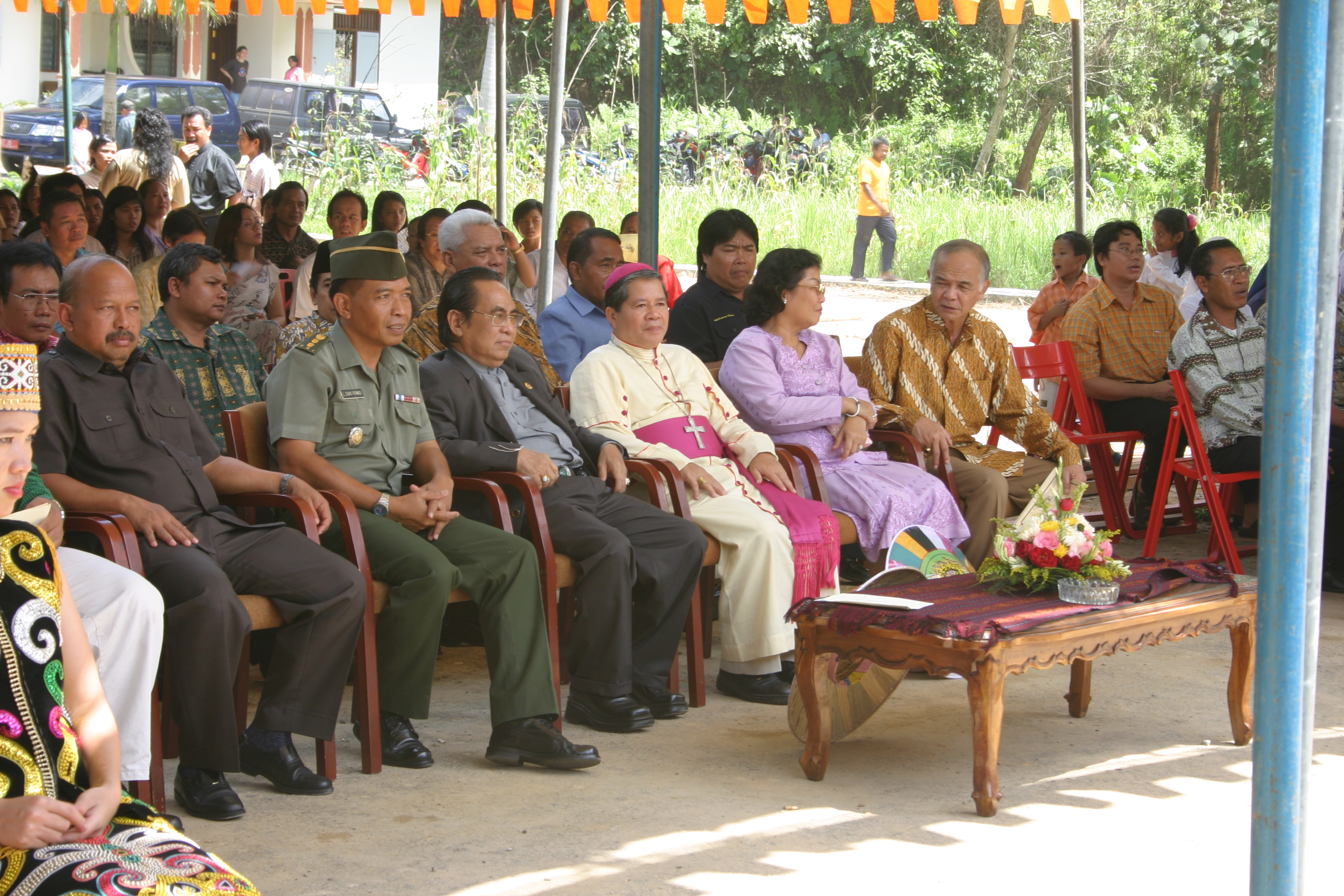
Ngayoh (third from left) as the vice governor at the opening of the Catholic Church Center of the Archdiocese of Samarinda in 2005.

Ngayoh became the vice governor for people's welfare in 1999 by Governor Suwarna A.F., ending the office's year-long vacancy. Ngayoh's appointment was seen by Akiko Morishita, a political researcher, as a way to garner support from the Dayaks. Ngayoh's work scope as a vice governor was expanded in 2000 to include matters relating to the development of the province.

After Suwarna's term was set to expire in 2003, a gubernatorial election was held to elect a new governor. As Suwarna had only served for a single term, he was eligible to run in the elections. Suwarna picked Ngayoh as his running mate and funded Dayak community meetings in East Kalimantan to attract support from the Dayaks. In return, the Dayaks made Suwarna their tribal chief and instructed Dayaks to support Suwarna.

The gubernatorial election, which was held on 2 June 2003, saw three pairs of candidates running for the office of Governor and Vice Governor. Suwarna Abdul Fatah and Yurnalis Ngayoh ran as independent candidates, Awang Faroek Ishak and Abu Thalib Chair were endorsed by the National Mandate Party and the National Awakening Party, and Imam Mundjiat and Hifnie Syarkawie were endorsed by the Indonesian Democratic Party of Struggle (PDIP). Although PDIP officially supported Mundjiat and Syarkawie, Suwarna's electoral team bribed PDIP MPs to vote for Suwarna and Ngayoh. PDIP's defection from their candidate resulted in a victory for Suwarna and Ngayoh with 24 out of 45 votes. Suwarna and Yurnalis were inaugurated for a second term on 25 June 2003. Suwarna's governorship was later supported by PDIP at the expense of Imam Mundjiat, PDIP's chairman in East Kalimantan.

The Dayaks lauded Suwarna and Ngayoh's victory in the election. At an opening statement in an all-Dayak conference, a speaker stated that "God has given us a chance in this reformation era. We have a governor who understands our situation and an indigenous [Dayak] as the vice governor."

== Governor of East Kalimantan ==
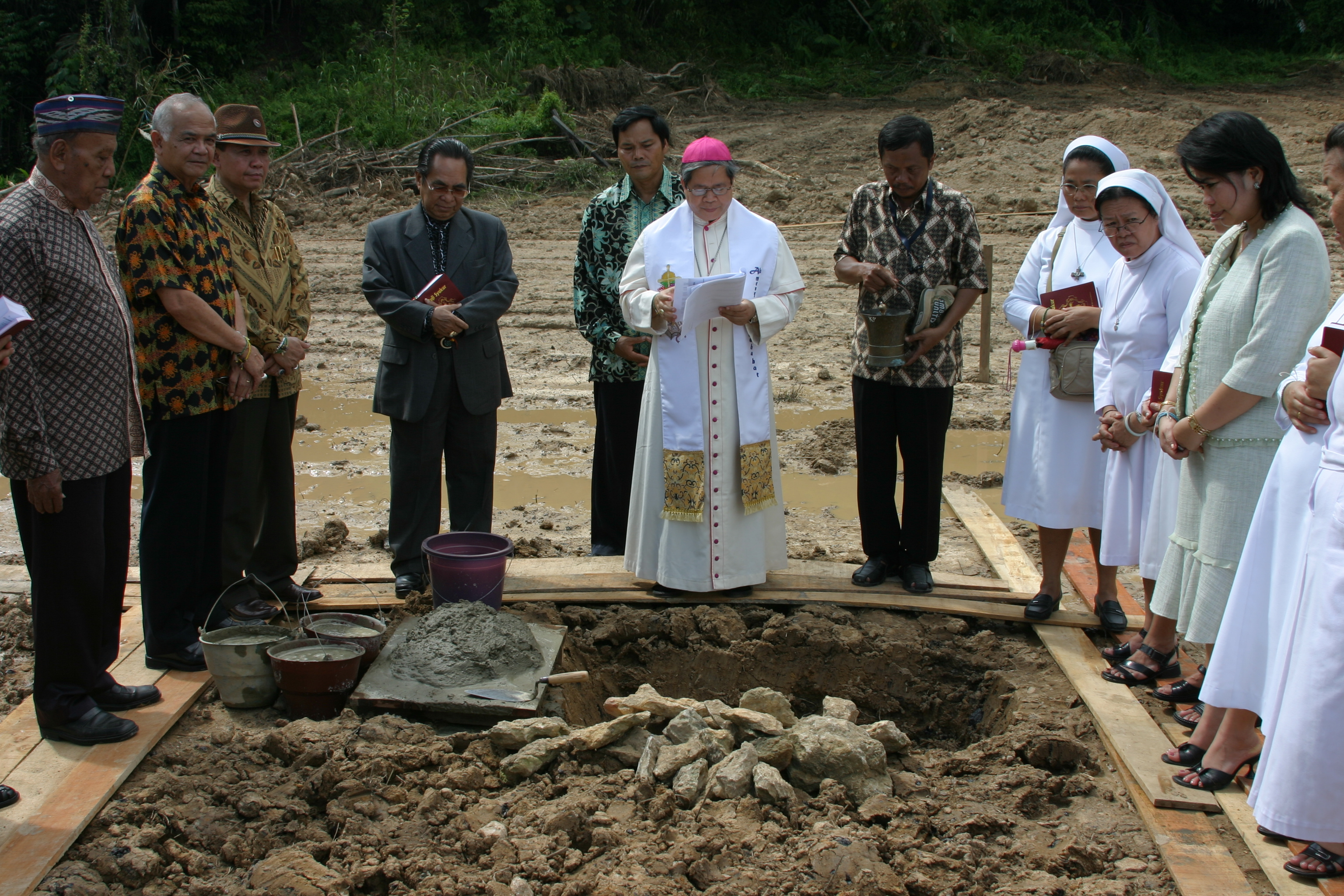
Ngayoh (fourth from left) as the acting governor at the opening of the bishop's residence of the Archdiocese of Samarinda in 2007

Suwarna's PDIP's support base did not last long, as the party later lost the 2004 Indonesian presidential election. Golkar replaced PDIP as the dominant political power in Indonesia. Consequently, Suwarna's longtime political opponent, Syaukani H.R., reported Suwarna to the Corruption Eradication Commission and accused him of releasing 147,000 hectares of forest area for oil palm plantations without any guarantee, causing state losses up to 440 billion rupiahs. Suwarna was arrested on 19 June 2006 and was sentenced to seven years in prison on 2 March 2007. Ngayoh, as the second most powerful official in the province, assumed office as the acting governor on 8 December 2006.

After a year serving as Acting Governor, Ngayoh was approved by East Kalimantan's Parliament to become the definitive governor on 28 January 2008. Ngayoh was sworn in as definitive Governor on 10 March and ended his term as definitive Governor on 25 June. During his brief stint as definitive governor, Ngayoh opposed the increase of fuel prices and encouraged the populace to protest against the policy. He also opposed direct cash relief for the compensation.

In the midst of his term as definitive Governor, Ngayoh applied for PDIP and Golkar endorsement as a candidate in the 2008 gubernatorial election. However, PDIP and Golkar rejected Ngayoh's application, causing furor amongst the Dayak populace. A group of Dayaks raided an event held by PDIP, while another group burned a Golkar office in Malinau. A coalition of various Dayak organizations representing the Dayak populace also declared that Dayaks would not participate in the elections. However, Ngayoh defied the coalition statement and encouraged Dayaks to vote in the election instead.

== Later life and death ==
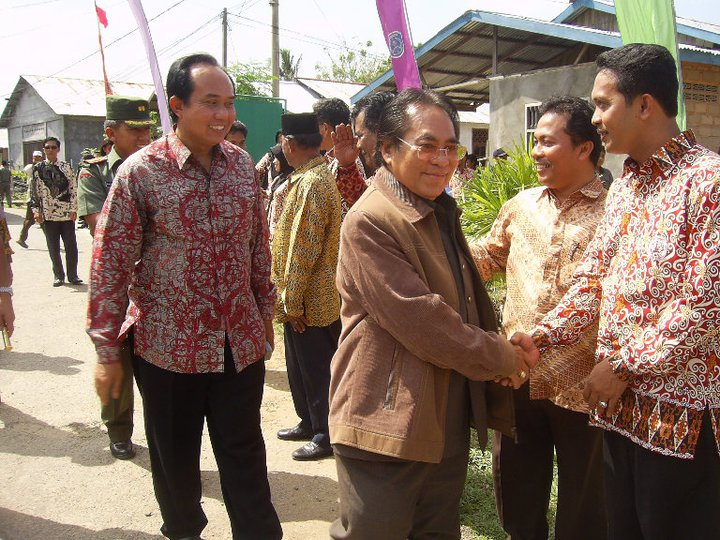
Yurnalis Ngayoh (wearing brown leather jacket) in 2010.

After his retirement from the government, Ngayoh was elected by the stockholders of the East Kalimantan Fertilizer Company as the Commissioner of the company. He was elected in a stockholders' meeting on 22 July 2009. Ngayoh also held a position as a lecturer and as the chairman of the Advisory Council in the Samarinda 17 August University.

Ngayoh died at 6.30 on 8 February 2021 in Abdul Wahab Sjahranie Regional Central Hospital, Samarinda. His body lay a day after his death at a funeral home in Vorvo Street, Samarinda and a requiem was held on the same day at the Santo Lukas Cenderawasih Cathedral. Yurnalis was buried on 10 February at the Sungai Siring Catholic Cemetery in Samarinda, with the Head of the East Kalimantan Transportation Agency A.F.F. Sembiring delivering his eulogy.

== Personal life ==
Ngayoh was married to Helena Nontje, a former English teacher in Tenggarong. The marriage produced four children, Adrianus Inu Natalisanto, Irene Yuriantini, Viktor A Yulian, and Ayang Viktoria Meity. Helena died on 2 March 2015.
