= Isran Noor =

Indonesian politician (born 1959)

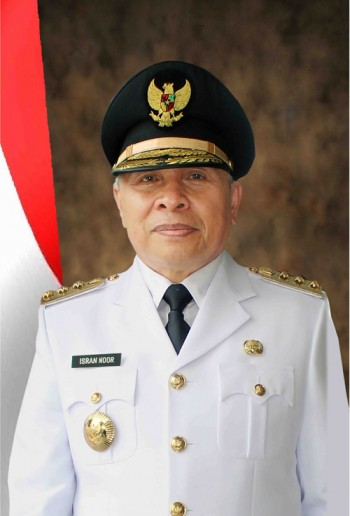

12th Governor of East Kalimantan
- In office 1 October 2018 – 1 October 2023
- Deputy: Hadi Mulyadi
- Preceded by: Awang Faroek Ishak; Restuardy Daud (acting)
- Succeeded by: Akmal Malik (acting); Rudy Mas'ud

3rd Regent of East Kutai
- In office 4 February 2009 – 30 March 2015
- Preceded by: Mahyudin
- Succeeded by: Ardiansyah Sulaiman

2nd Vice-regent of East Kutai
- In office 13 February 2006 – 4 February 2009
- Preceded by: Mahyudin
- Succeeded by: Ardiansyah Sulaiman

Chairman of PKPI acting
- In office 23 June 2015 – 27 August 2016
- Preceded by: Sutiyoso
- Succeeded by: Hendropriyono

Personal details
- Born: 20 September 1959 (age 67) Sangkulirang, East Kalimantan, Indonesia
- Party: Demokrat
- Other political affiliations: Nasdem (2020–2023); PKPI (2015–2016)
- Spouse: Norbaiti Isran Noor (m. 1991; died 2023)
- Education: Mulawarman University

Isran Noor (born 20 September 1959) is an Indonesian politician and academic who was the governor of East Kalimantan from 2018 to 2023.

Before becoming governor, he was active in the province's civil servantry, and later became the regent of East Kutai Regency for 6 years until he resigned before his first term expired.

== Background ==
Born to a farming family in the town of Sangkulirang on 20 September 1959, he completed his early education there before finishing highschool in the provincial capital at Samarinda. Afterwards, he completed his bachelors at Mulawarman University, graduating in 1980.

Later on, he would obtain his masters from Dr. Soetomo University in Surabaya (2003) and a PhD from Padjadjaran University in Bandung (2014).

== Career ==
After obtaining his bachelor's degree, Noor became a civil servant, working as an educator for farmers in the province between 1981 and 1995. In 1996, he was promoted to the head of agriculture, and was promoted again in 2001 to become the assistant for economy and development in East Kutai Regency.

=== East Kutai ===
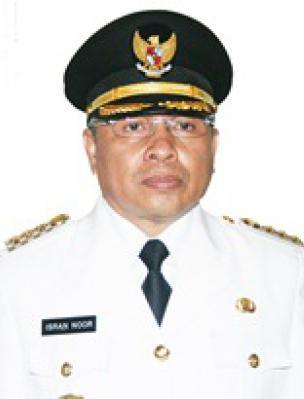
Isran Noor as Regent of East Kutai

in 2005, he ran in the local election for East Kutai Regency as a running mate of Awang Faroek Ishak and the pair won, being sworn in on 13 February 2006. When Ishak was elected governor, Noor was appointed as regent to replace him, being sworn in on 4 February 2009 In 2010, he ran in the local election with Ardiansyah Sulaiman and won, securing 51.1 percent of the votes.

During his term as regent, he shut down several coal mines for violating operating permits including one owned by Churchill Mining. When brought to the International Court of Arbitration, the court upheld the government's decision and rejected demands for $2 billion in damages.

In 2014, he had his staff report a Facebook user for slandering him. During the trial of Muhammad Nazaruddin, Nazaruddin mentioned him as having received Rp 5 billion to issue a coal mining permit.

Close to the end of his term, he decided to resign in 2015. When questioned, he cited a law which transfers management rights of certain sectors, including mineral and forestry resources, to the provincial government from the regencies. His resignation was accepted on 30 March 2015.

=== Political parties ===
In 2014, he participated in the national convention of Demokrat, attempting to be selected as the party's presidential candidate. When he failed, he participated in a "people's convention" which states that its aim was to "provide alternative presidential candidates".

Later, he was active in PKPI when Sutiyoso resigned as chairman, appointing Noor as acting chairman on 23 June 2015. On 27 August 2016, he was replaced by Hendropriyono.

=== Governor ===
He ran in the East Kalimantan 2018 gubernatorial election with the support of PKS, PAN and Gerindra, winning 31.6 percent of the votes and securing the gubernatorial seat with Hadi Mulyadi as his deputy. He was sworn into office on 1 October 2018.
