= Awang Faroek Ishak =

Indonesian politician (1948–2024)

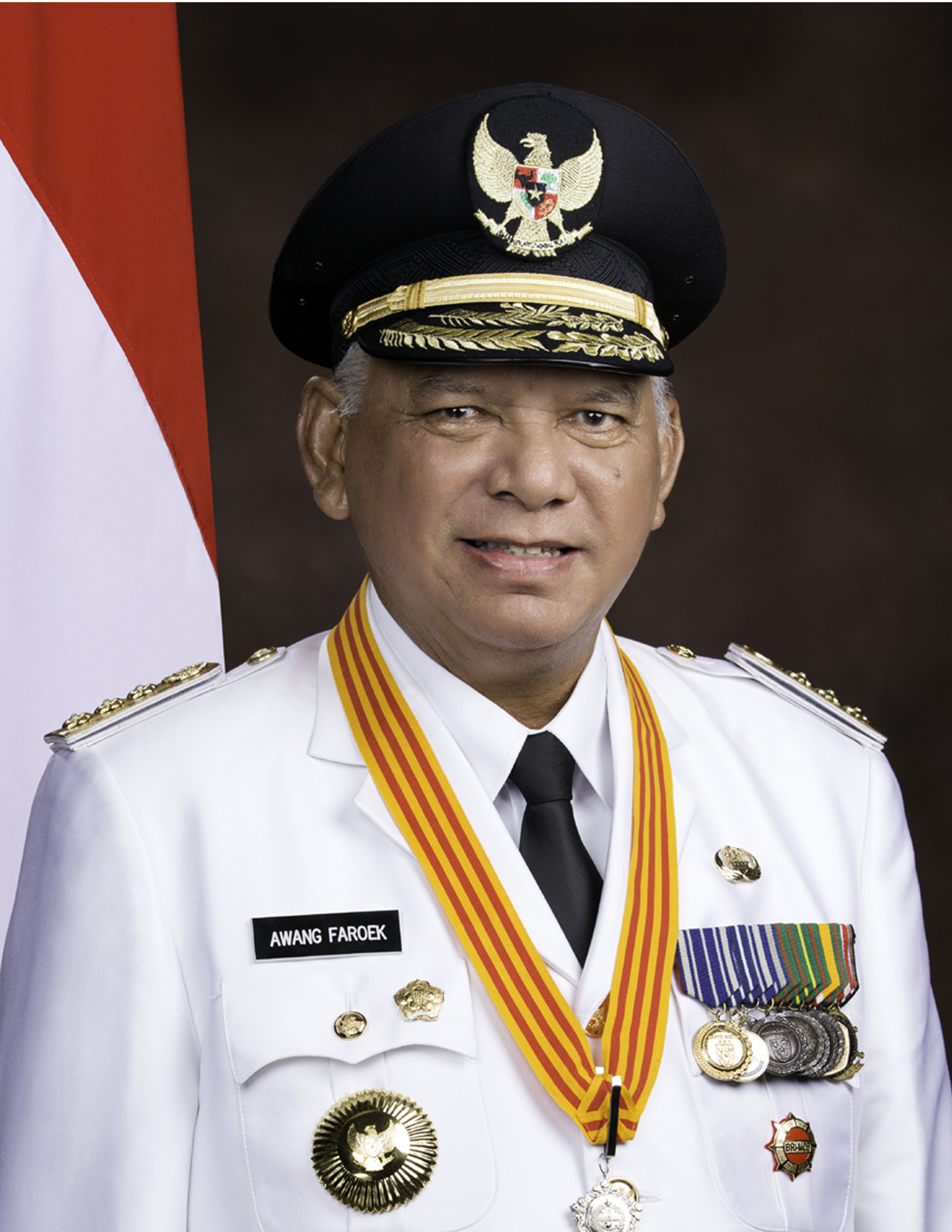

11th Governor of East Kalimantan
- In office 17 December 2008 – 18 September 2018
- Deputy: Farid Wadjdy (2008–2013); Mukmin Faisyal (2013–2017); Vacant (2017–2018)
- Preceded by: Yurnalis Ngayoh; Syaiful Teteng (acting); Tarmizi Abdul Karim (acting)
- Succeeded by: Meiliana (acting); Restuardy Daud (acting); Isran Noor

1st Regent of East Kutai
- In office 1999–2003
- Deputy: Mahyudin
- Preceded by: Position Established
- Succeeded by: Mahyudin

Member of People's Representative Council
- In office 1 October 2019 – 1 October 2024
- Constituency: East Kalimantan
- In office 1 October 1987 – 1 October 1997
- Constituency: East Kalimantan

Personal details
- Born: 31 July 1948 Tenggarong, East Kalimantan, Indonesia
- Died: 22 December 2024 (aged 76) Balikpapan, East Kalimantan, Indonesia
- Party: Golkar Party (1976–2016); NasDem Party (2016–2024)
- Spouse: Ence Amelia
- Children: Awang Ferdian Hidayat; Dayang Dona Faroek
- Education: IKIP Malang (S.Pd.); University of Indonesia (M.Si.)

Awang Faroek Ishak (31 July 1948 – 22 December 2024) was an Indonesian politician who served as the eleventh governor of East Kalimantan from 2008 to 2018. Originally, his tenure ended in December 2018, but he resigned on 4 September 2018 in order to run in the 2019 Legislative Election, competing for a seat in the People's Representative Council from East Kalimantan and then got elected.

== Early life ==
Ishak was born in Tenggarong on 31 July 1948. He is the eleventh child of thirteen siblings from couple of Awang Ishak and Dayang Johariah.

Ishak studied at the Malang Teachers' Institute (IKIP Malang, today State University of Malang) for a bachelor's degree of social education in 1973.

== Political life ==
During his term as the first regent of East Kutai, he inaugurated the launching of public broadcast service TV Kutim in 2003. Awang Faroek Ishak shortly resigned from the office in 2003 to run as a candidate for governor of East Kalimantan, although he lost in a vote inside the Regional House of Representatives of East Kalimantan against incumbent Suwarna Abdul Fatah. Nonetheless, he returned as a regent of East Kutai following a local election in 2005.

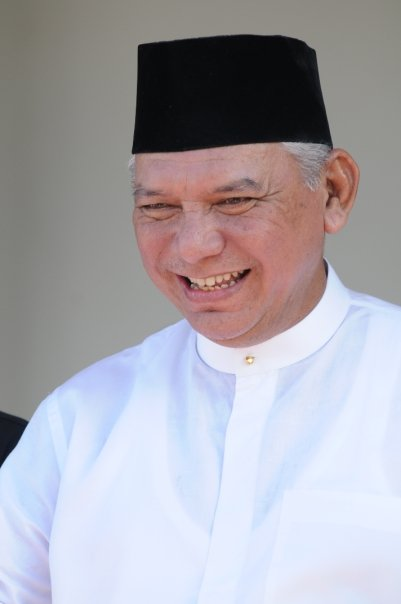
Awang Faroek Ishak at 2017.

Ishak re-took the Regent position from Mahyudin after winning the East Kalimantan gubernatorial election in 2008 in two rounds. In the first round, Ishak and his running mate Farid Wadjdy won first place, defeating Achmad Amins and Jusuf SK. But because Ishak did not poll strongly enough to win outright (less than the 30% of the ballot needed to be declared the winner), the KPU (Election Committee) declared that a second round would be necessary with Ishak and Achmad Amins as the two runoff candidates.

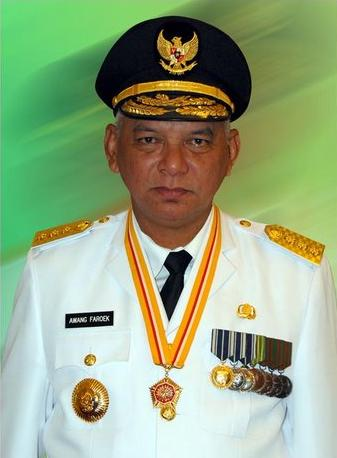
Awang Faroek Ishak at his first term as governor

In 2018, he declared his intention to run for the People's Representative Council, resigning from the governorship on 18 September. He won a seat as a NasDem Party legislator, but was not reelected for another term in 2024.

== Death ==
Ishak died at Kanujoso Hospital in Balikpapan, on 22 December 2024, at the age of 76. Before his death, he was diagnosed of Bell's palsy in 2014. He was buried a day later at the Islamic cemetery of Sukarame, Tenggarong.

== Honours ==
- Star of Service, (1st Class) (Bintang Jasa Utama) - 2014
- Star of the Indonesian Veteran Legion (Bintang Legiun Veteran Indonesia)
- Badge of Melati (Lencana Melati)
- Badge of Darma Bakti (Lencana Darma Bakti)
- Medal for Service in the Field of Social Welfare (Satyalancana Kebhaktian Sosial)
- Medal for Contributing in the National Development (Satyalancana Pembangunan)
- Medal for Providing an Example of Meritorious Personality (Satyalancana Wira Karya)
- Civil Servants' Long Service Medal (Satyalancana Karya Satya)

Political offices
Preceded by Office created	Regent of East Kutai, Indonesia; 1999–2003	Succeeded by Mahyudin
Preceded by Mahyudin	Regent of East Kutai, Indonesia; 2006–2008	Succeeded by Isran Noor
Preceded by Yurnalis Ngayoh	Governor of East Kalimantan, Indonesia; 2008–2018	Succeeded by Isran Noor
