= Mayor of Balikpapan =

- Wali Kota Balikpapan
- Coat of arms of Balikpapan

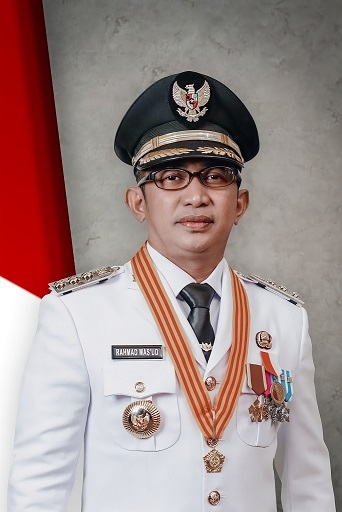
- Incumbent; Rahmad Mas'ud since 31 May 2021
- Term length: 5 years
- Inaugural holder: Aji Raden Sayid Mohammad
- Formation: 1960
- Website: Official website

Mayor of Balikpapan is the head of the second-level region who holds the government in Balikpapan, Indonesia, together with the Vice Mayor and 45 members of the Balikpapan City Regional House of Representatives. The mayor and vice mayor of Balikpapan are elected through general elections held every 5 years. The first mayor of Balikpapan was Aji Raden Sayid Mohammad, who governed the city period from 1960 to 1963.

== List ==
The following is a list of the names of the Mayors of Balikpapan from time to time.

| Num. | Portrait | Mayor | Beginning of office | End of Term | Political Party / Faction | Period | Notes | Vice mayor |
|---|---|---|---|---|---|---|---|---|
| 1 | | Aji Raden Sayid Mohammad | 1960 | 1963 | PNI | 1 | (Note: Previously served as Wedana of South Kutai, based in Balikpapan.) | N/A |
| 2 | | Bambang Sutikno | 1963 | 1965 | ABRI–AD | 2 | (Note: Dishonorably discharged because he was accused of being affiliated with the PKI.) | N/A |
| 3 | | Imat Saili | 1965 | 1967 | ABRI–AD | 3 | | N/A |
| 4 | | Zainal Arifin | 1967 | 1973 | ABRI–Polri | 4 | | N/A |
| 5 | | Asnawi Arbain | 1974 | 1981 | ABRI–Polri | 5 | | N/A |
| 6 | | Syarifuddin Yoes | 1981 | 1989 | ABRI–AD | 6 | | N/A |
| 7 | | Tjutjup Suparna | 1991 | 2001 | ABRI–AD | 7 | | N/A |
| 8 | | Imdaad Hamid | June 2001 | June 2006 | Independent | 8 | | Mukmin Faisyal |
| 8 | | Imdaad Hamid | June 2006 | 29 May 2011 | Independent | 9 (2006) | | Rizal Effendi |
| 9 | | Rizal Effendi | 29 May 2011 | 29 May 2016 | Independent | 10 (2011) | | Heru Bambang |
| 9 | | Rizal Effendi | 30 May 2016 | 30 May 2021 | Nasdem | 11 (2015) | | Rahmad Mas'ud |
| 10 | | Rahmad Mas'ud | 31 May 2021 | 20 February 2025 | Golkar | 12 (2020) | | N/A |
| 10 | | Rahmad Mas'ud | 20 February 2025 | Incumbent | Golkar | 13 (2024) | | Bagus Susetyo |

== Temporary replacement ==
In the government stack, a regional head who submits himself to leave or temporarily resigns from his position to the central government, then the Minister of Home Affairs prepares a replacement who is a bureaucrat in the regional government or even a vice mayor, including when the mayor's position is in a transition period.

| Portrait | Mayor | Party | Beginning | End | Duration | Definitive | Ref. |
|---|---|---|---|---|---|---|---|
| | Hermain Okol (Acting) | Independent | 1989 | 1991 | 1–2 years | Transition (1989–1991) | |
| | Sayid Muhammad Nur Fadly (Daily executive) | Independent | 30 May 2021 | 31 May 2021 | 1 day | Transition (2021) | |
| | Ahmad Muzakkir (Temporary acting) | Independent | 25 September 2024 | 23 November 2024 | 12 days (2020) (Note: Incumbent Mayor Rahmad Mas'ud is on campaign leave for the 2024 Balikpapan mayoral election from 25 September 2024 to 23 November 2024, the position of interim mayor is held by Temporary Acting Mayor Ahmad Muzakkir.) | Rahmad Mas'ud | |

== See also ==
- Balikpapan
- List of incumbent regional heads and deputy regional heads in East Kalimantan
