= List of incumbent regional heads and deputy regional heads in East Kalimantan =

The following is an article about the list of Regional Heads and Deputy Regional Heads in 10 regencies/cities in East Kalimantan who are currently still serving.

== List ==
Regency/ City	Photo of the Regent/ Mayor	Regent/ Mayor	Photo of Deputy Regent/ Mayor	Deputy Regent/ Mayor	Taking Office	End of Office (Planned)	Ref.
Berau; Regency List of Regents/Deputy Regents		Sri Juniarsih Mas		Gamalis	15 April 2025	15 April 2030	
West Kutai; Regency List of Regents/Deputy Regents		Frederick Edwin		Nanang Adriani	20 February 2025	20 February 2030	
Kutai Kartanegara; Regency List of Regents/Deputy Regents		Aulia Rahman Basri		Rendi Solihin	23 June 2025	23 June 2030	
East Kutai; Regency List of Regents/Deputy Regents		Ardiansyah Sulaiman		Mahyunadi	20 February 2025	20 February 2030	
Mahakam Ulu; Regency List of Regents/Deputy Regents		Angela Idang Belawan		Suhuk	23 September 2025	23 September 2030	
Paser; Regency List of Regents/Deputy Regents		Fahmi Fadli		Ikhwan Antasari	20 February 2025	20 February 2030	
Penajam North Paser; Regency List of Regents/Deputy Regents		Mudyat Noor		Abdul Waris Muin	20 February 2025	20 February 2030	
Balikpapan; City List of Mayors/Deputy mayors		Rahmad Mas'ud		Bagus Susetyo	20 February 2025	20 February 2030	
Bontang; City List of Mayors/Deputy mayors		Neni Moerniaeni		Agus Haris	20 February 2025	20 February 2030	
Samarinda; City List of Mayors/Deputy mayors		Andi Harun		Saefuddin Zuhri	20 February 2025	20 February 2030	

Notes

- "Commencement of office" is the inauguration date at the beginning or during the current term of office. For acting regents/mayors, it is the date of appointment or extension as acting regent/mayor.
- Based on the Constitutional Court decision Number 27/PUU-XXII/2024, the Governor and Deputy Governor, Regent and Deputy Regent, and Mayor and Deputy Mayor elected in 2020 shall serve until the inauguration of the Governor and Deputy Governor, Regent and Deputy Regent, and Mayor and Deputy Mayor elected in the 2024 national simultaneous elections as long as the term of office does not exceed 5 (five) years.

== See also ==
- East Kalimantan
