= Ipong =

Ipong can be both a given name and a surname. Notable people with the name include:

- Ipong Muchlissoni (born 1967), Indonesian diplomat
- Boy Ipong (1945–1983), Philippine dissident
