= Wahyuni =

Wahyuni can be both a middle name and a surname. Notable people with the name include:

- Sri Wahyuni Agustiani (born 1994), Indonesian weightlifter
- Sri Wahyuni (born 1967), Indonesian politician
