= Imdaad Hamid =

Indonesian politician (1944–2022)

Mayor of Balikpapan
- In office June 2001 – 29 May 2011
- Preceded by: Tjutjup Suparna
- Succeeded by: Rizal Effendi

Personal details
- Born: 5 July 1944 Tenggarong, Japanese-occupied Dutch East Indies
- Died: 3 August 2022 (aged 78) Jakarta, Indonesia
- Education: Mulawarman University

Imdaad Hamid (5 July 1944 – 3 August 2022) was an Indonesian politician. He served as mayor of Balikpapan from 2001 to 2011. He contested East Kalimantan's 2013 gubernatorial election with Ipong Muchlissoni as his running mate, but lost to Awang Faroek Ishak.

Imdaad died in Jakarta on 3 August 2022, at the age of 78.
