= 2024 Balikpapan mayoral election =

- 27 November 2024
- Turnout: 60.54%
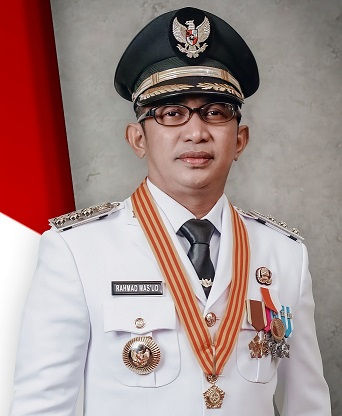

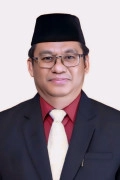

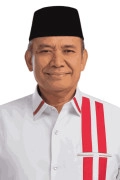
Candidate	Rahmad Mas'ud	Muhammad Sa'bani	Rendi Susiswo Ismail
Party	Golkar	Demokrat	PDI-P
Running mate	Bagus Susetyo	Syukri Wahid	Eddy Sunardi Darmawan
Popular vote	177,290	76,187	45,668
Percentage	59.27%	25.47%	15.27%
Mayor before election
Rahmad Mas'ud
Golkar
Elected mayor
Rahmad Mas'ud
Golkar

The 2024 Balikpapan mayoral election was held on 27 November 2024 as part of nationwide local elections to elect the mayor and vice mayor of Balikpapan, East Kalimantan for a five-year term. The previous election was held in 2020. Mayor Rahmad Mas'ud of Golkar won the election in a landslide with 59% of the vote. The Democratic Party's Muhammad Sa'bani placed second with 25%, followed by Rendi Susiswo Ismail of the Indonesian Democratic Party of Struggle (PDI-P), who received 15%.

== Electoral system ==
The election, like other local elections in 2024, follow the first-past-the-post system where the candidate with the most votes wins the election, even if they do not win a majority. It is possible for a candidate to run uncontested, in which case the candidate is still required to win a majority of votes "against" an "empty box" option. Should the candidate fail to do so, the election will be repeated on a later date.

== Candidates ==
According to electoral regulations, in order to qualify for the election, candidates were required to secure support from a political party or a coalition of parties controlling 9 seats (20 percent of all seats) in the Balikpapan Regional House of Representatives (DPRD). The Golkar party, with 16 seats from the 2024 legislative election, is the only party eligible to nominate a candidate without forming a coalition with other parties. Candidates may alternatively demonstrate support to run as an independent in form of photocopies of identity cards, which in Balikpapan's case corresponds to 38,212 copies. One candidate registered to run as an independent, but did not submit sufficient proofs of support to the General Elections Commission (KPU). The candidate Joy Nashar Utamajaya only submitted eight copies, claiming that his team had collected 30 thousand proofs of support but still did not have enough, and that his registration was "symbolic".

=== Potential ===
The following are individuals who have either been publicly mentioned as a potential candidate by a political party in the DPRD, publicly declared their candidacy with press coverage, or considered as a potential candidate by media outlets:

- Rahmad Mas'ud (Golkar), incumbent mayor.
- Eddy Sunardi Darmawan (PDI-P), member of the East Kalimantan Regional House of Representatives.

== Political map ==
Following the 2024 Indonesian legislative election, nine political parties are represented in the Balikpapan DPRD:

Political parties	Seat count
Party of Functional Groups (Golkar)	16 / 45
NasDem Party	7 / 45
Great Indonesia Movement Party (Gerindra)	6 / 45
Indonesian Democratic Party of Struggle (PDI-P)	4 / 45
National Awakening Party (PKB)	4 / 45
Prosperous Justice Party (PKS)	3 / 45
United Development Party (PPP)	2 / 45
People's Conscience Party (Hanura)	2 / 45
Democratic Party (Demokrat)	1 / 45

== Results ==
Candidate	Running mate	Party	Votes	%
Rahmad Mas'ud	Bagus Susetyo	Golkar	177,290	59.27
Muhammad Sa'bani	Syukri Wahid	Democratic Party	76,187	25.47
Rendi Susiswo Ismail	Eddy Sunardi Darmawan	Indonesian Democratic Party of Struggle	45,668	15.27
Total			299,145	100.00
Valid votes			299,145	94.84
Invalid/blank votes			16,279	5.16
Total votes			315,424	100.00
Registered voters/turnout			520,986	60.54
Source: KPU
