= Markum Singodimedjo =

Indonesian politician (1945–2022)

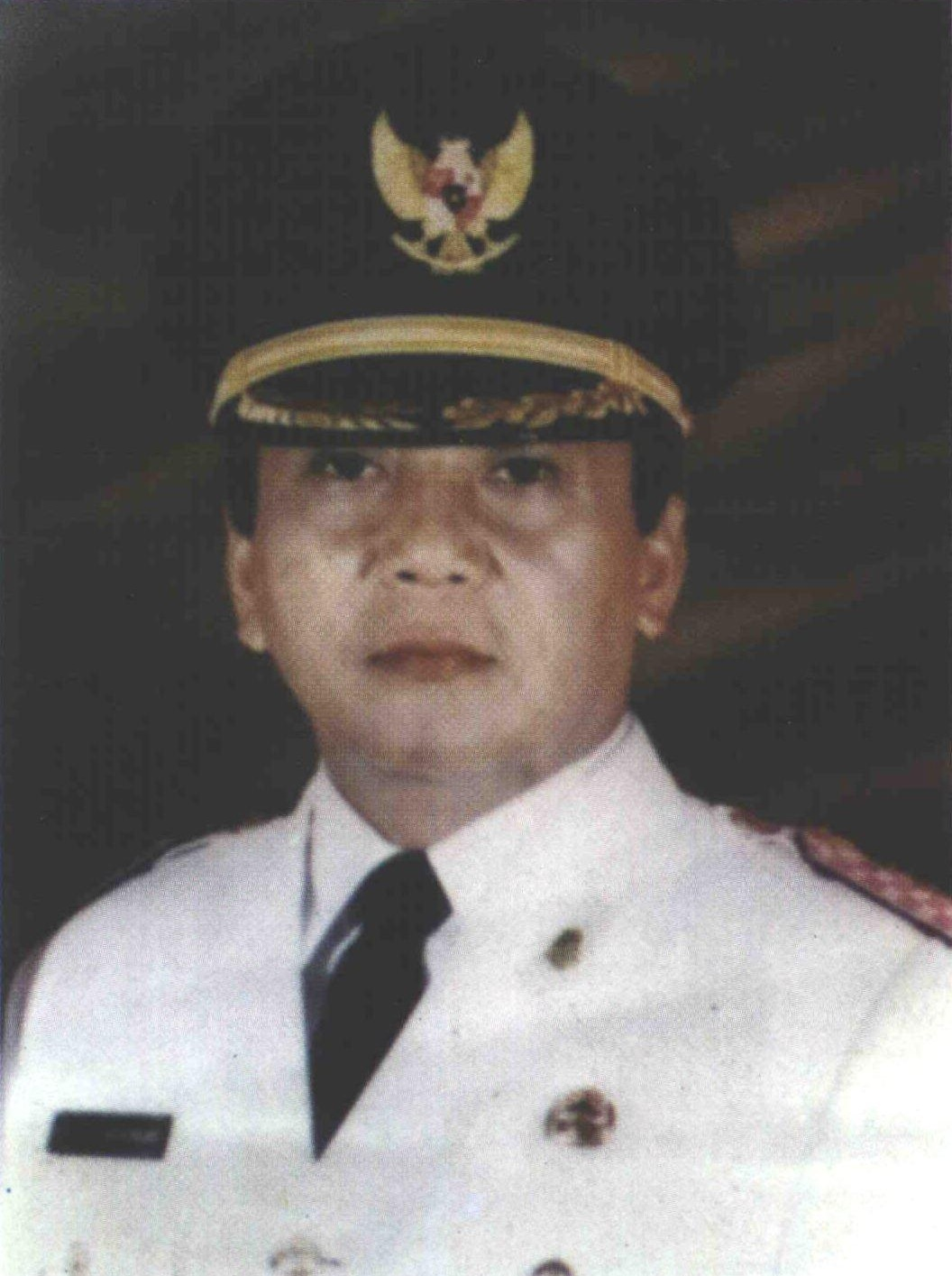
- Singodimedjo as regent

Member of the House of Representatives
- In office 20 September 2010 – 1 October 2014
- Preceded by: Mustokoweni Murdi
- In office 1 October 2004 – 1 October 2009

Regent of Ponorogo
- In office 2000–2004
- In office 19 December 1994 – 19 December 1999
- Preceded by: Gatot Soemani
- Succeeded by: Muryanto (act.); Muhadi Suyono

Personal details
- Born: 16 August 1945 Malang Regency, Japanese-occupied Dutch East Indies
- Died: 30 April 2022 (aged 76) Surabaya, East Java, Indonesia
- Party: Golkar

Markum Singodimedjo (16 August 1945 – 30 April 2022) was an Indonesian civil servant and politician of the Golkar party. He served as a member of the House of Representatives from 2004 to 2009 and 2010 to 2014, and he was the regent of Ponorogo Regency in East Java from 1994 to 2004.

== Early life ==
Markun Singodimedjo was born on 16 August 1945 in Malang Regency. After completing elementary school in 1958 and middle school in 1961, he moved to Surabaya for further education, completing high school in 1964. He then enrolled at the IPN, graduating in 1967. He received another degree from 17 August 1945 University Surabaya in 1970. He obtained a master's degree from the University of Surabaya in 1994.

== Career ==
Singodimedjo began his career as a government employee in the 1970s, and in 1977 he became head of the municipal information office in Bondowoso Regency. In 1984, he was reassigned to the same position in Surabaya, before being appointed to head the provincial information office in Aceh in 1986. While in Aceh, he also became a member of its provincial electoral commission for the 1987 election. He then was assigned to Riau from 1989 to 1992 in a similar capacity before returning to East Java, again becoming head of its information office in 1992–1994.

Following a six-month election process described as "intense", Singodimedjo was sworn in as regent of Ponorogo on 19 December 1994 by governor Basofi Sudirman. During his first term as regent, Singodimedjo promoted Ponorogo's history and culture, and initiated an annual Reog festival to celebrate Ponorogo's founding date. He further sponsored a monthly Reog show which involved local performance groups. A number of new municipal buildings were also constructed in his first term, including one for the municipal legislature.

In 2000, Singodimedjo (a Golkar member) faced an uphill race as the municipal legislature was dominated by Indonesian Democratic Party of Struggle members, but he managed to secure re-election after lobbying Reog groups who in turn pressured local legislators to vote for him. Singodimedjo in his second term issued a circular letter to municipal workers in Ponorogo to take part in a Golkar party event (a standard practice during the New Order period), which resulted in a lawsuit. In 2002, he received a fake honoris causa professorship from the "Northern California Global University", a diploma mill, which resulted in a brief scandal.

In 2004, Singodimedjo ran in the 2004 Indonesian legislative election and won a seat in the House of Representatives. Due to this election, he would resign from his post as regent. He ran for a second term from East Java's 7th electoral district in the 2009 election, but was not elected. In July 2010, legislator Mustokoweni Murdi who had been Golkar's elected representative from East Java VII died, and Singodimedjo was sworn in as her replacement on 20 September 2010. In the 2014 legislative election, he ran for a seat in the Regional Representative Council in East Java, but failed to win a seat.

== Later life ==
Singodimedjo died at his home in Surabaya on 30 April 2022, and was buried at the Keputih Public Cemetery in the city. He was married to Hendriyetti Markum, and the couple had two children.
