= Rizal Effendi =

Indonesian journalist and politician

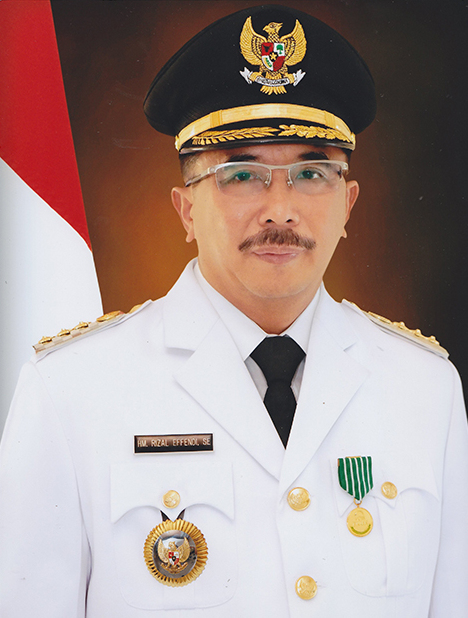

Mayor of Balikpapan
- In office 29 May 2011 – 29 May 2021
- Governor: Awang Faroek Ishak; Isran Noor
- Deputy: Heru Bambang (2011–2016); Rahmad Mas'ud (2016–2021)
- Preceded by: Imdaad Hamid
- Succeeded by: Rahmad Mas'ud

Deputy Mayor of Balikpapan
- In office 2006–2011
- Mayor: Imdaad Hamid
- Succeeded by: Heru Bambang

Member of People's Consultative Assembly
- In office 1994–1995

Personal details
- Born: 27 August 1958 (age 68) Balikpapan, East Kalimantan
- Education: Mulawarman University

M. Rizal Effendi is an Indonesian journalist and politician who served as the mayor of Balikpapan, East Kalimantan for two terms between 2011 and 2021.

A graduate of Mulawarman University, Effendi briefly served as a member of the People's Consultative Assembly and headed a local newspaper before becoming a deputy mayor. Following his first term, he was elected the city's mayor in 2011 and again in 2016. He was also a vice governor candidate in the 2018 election, although he failed to win the seat.

== Background ==
Rizal Effendi was born in Balikpapan on 27 August 1958. He completed his education in the city of Samarinda, and earned his bachelor's degree in economics at Mulawarman University there in 1995. He is married to Yohana Palupi Arita, with three children.

== Career ==
=== Journalism ===
During his time at university, Effendi was active in the campus newspaper. He entered journalism and eventually, after a one-year appointment at the People's Consultative Assembly between 1994 and 1995, he became the head of the editorial board of Kaltim Pos in 1995, a position he held until 2006. He also became the deputy chair of the national journalist association. Effendi was also named chief executive officer of the local electrical company at Samarinda between 2003 and 2006.

=== Politics ===
In 2006, he ran as deputy mayor in the mayoral election for Balikpapan, being the running mate of incumbent Imdaad Hamid. In 2011, Rizal run as mayor (with Hamid being barred by term limits) with Heru Bambang as his running mate. The pair won after securing 59.8 percent (127,807 votes), winning in all five subdistricts of the city.

His program involved the development of an industrial zone in the city, meant to become a manufacturing hub for raw materials from the hinterlands of the city, in addition to developing coastal areas as a trade and services zone.

He managed to secure a second term in the 2015 local elections, with his deputy changed to Rahmad Mas'ud.

In 2018, he ran in the province's gubernatorial election as running mate to Andi Sofyan Hasdam, although the pair lost. The pair placed last in the four-way race, winning 288,166 votes (21.32%). After his tenure as mayor ended, he joined the NasDem Party and unsuccessfully ran for a seat in the national House of Representatives representing East Kalimantan in the 2024 legislative election.
