= Muhadi Suyono =

Indonesian politician (1945–2012)

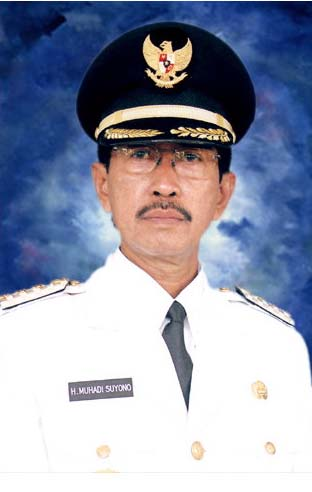

Regent of Ponorogo
- In office 2005–2010
- Preceded by: Muryanto (act.); Markum Singodimedjo
- Succeeded by: Amin

Personal details
- Born: 28 December 1945 Ponorogo, East Java, Indonesia
- Died: 12 September 2012 (aged 66) Ponorogo, East Java, Indonesia

Muhadi Suyono (28 December 1945 – 12 September 2012) was an Indonesian civil servant and politician. He served as the regent of Ponorogo Regency in East Java from 2005 to 2010 as its first directly elected leader.

== Early life ==
Muhadi Suyono was born in Ponorogo Regency on 28 December 1945. Both his parents were active members of the Nahdlatul Ulama (NU) Muslim organization, and Suyono would also become an active NU member during his studies. He studied law at the Brawijaya University in Malang, during which he joined the Indonesian Islamic Students Movement.

== Career ==
After graduating from Brawijaya, Suyono worked for a time as a lecturer at Ponorogo's Merdeka University, before he became a civil servant. By 1997, he had become the regional secretary of Probolinggo Regency, a post he held until 2005.

=== Regent ===
In 2005, Suyono ran in Ponorogo's first direct regency election with Amin as running mate, the pair being supported by the National Awakening Party. Suyono and Amin won 222,647 votes (45.2%), defeating four other candidate pairs. During Suyono's tenure as regent, a brief controversy occurred in 2007 due to a Malaysian government website which listed Ponorogo's reog as a Malaysian cultural tradition (as a result of past migration of Ponorogo's inhabitants to Malaysia), and Suyono declared that the Ponorogo regency government would "pursue legal action" against the Malaysian government. The controversy later settled down, with Suyono attending an invitation to the Malaysian Embassy in Jakarta.

Suyono ran for a second term in 2010, but was defeated by his former deputy Amin who ran on a separate ticket. Suyono secured 166,870 votes (32.15%) to Amin's 248,651 (46.3%) in the three-way race.

== Death ==
Suyono died on the evening of 12 September 2012 at Ponorogo's Regional Hospital, and he was buried at the Tamanarum cemetery in Ponorogo.
