= Mayor of Samarinda =

Executive head of Samarinda City, Indonesia

- Wali Kota Samarinda
- Coat of arms of Samarinda

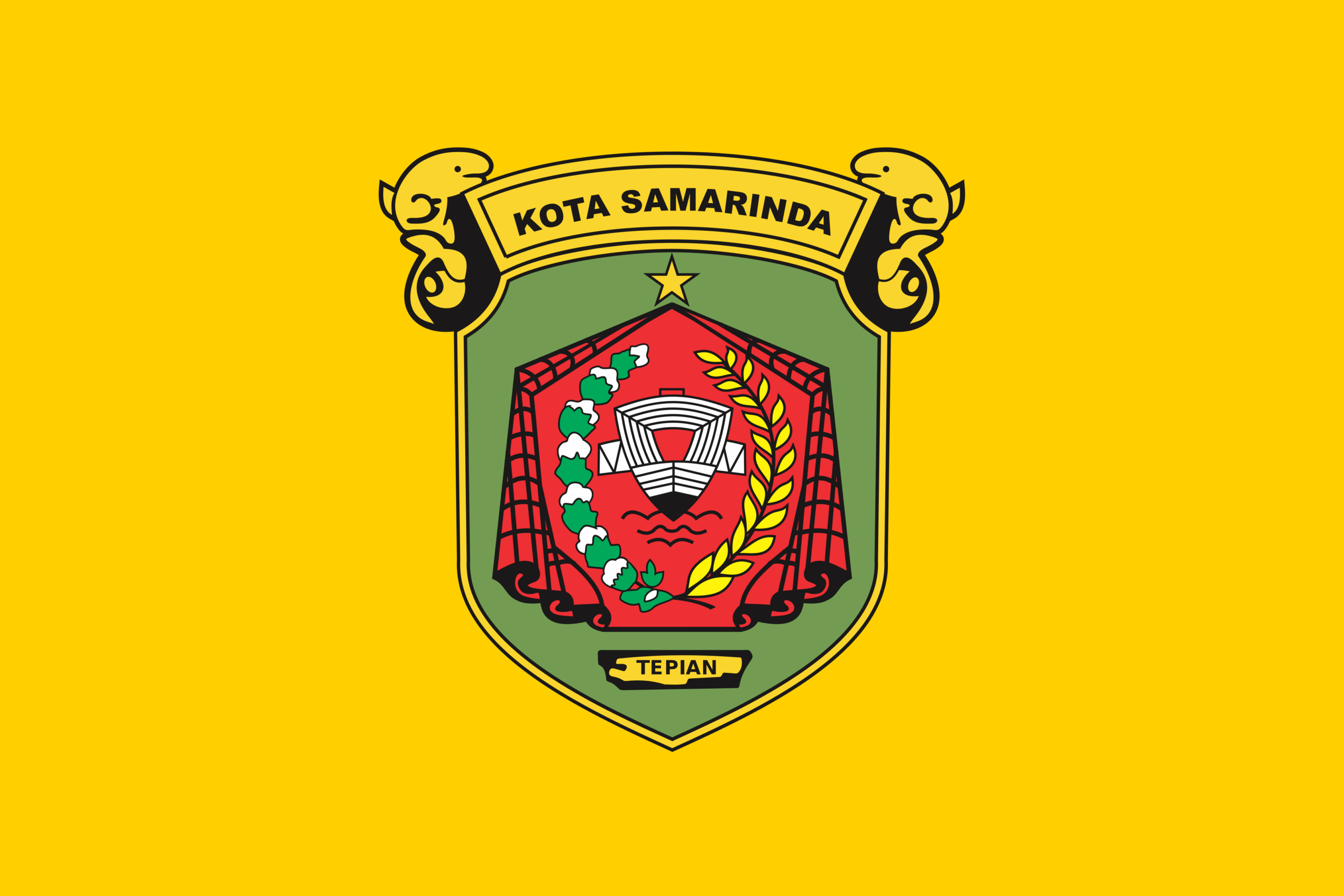
- Flag of Samarinda

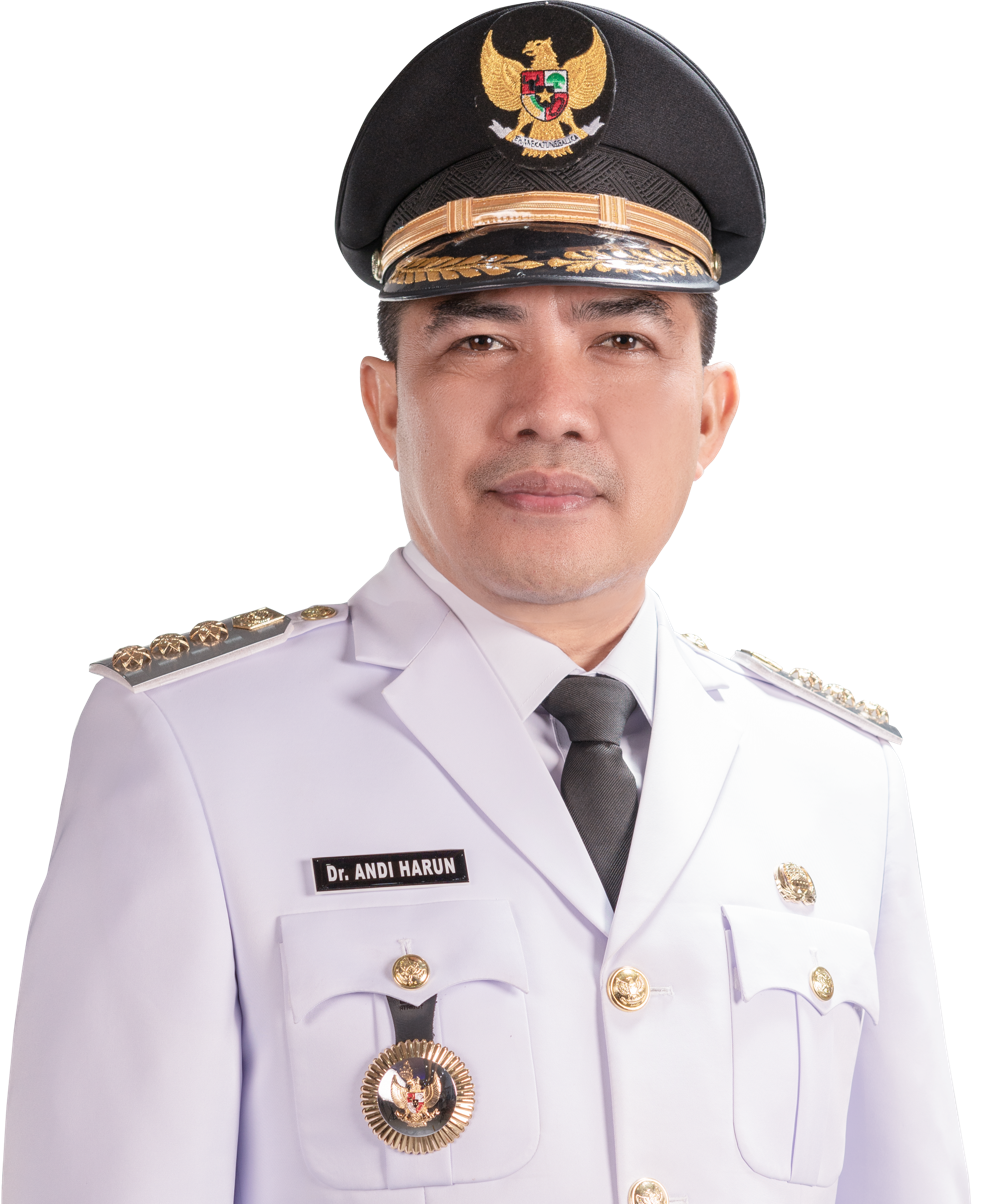
- Incumbent; Andi Harun since 26 February 2021
- Type: Mayor
- Appointer: Elected by the citizenry
- Term length: Five years, renewable once
- Inaugural holder: Soedjono AJ
- Formation: 1960
- Deputy: Vice Mayor of Samarinda
- Salary: Rp 2.1 million per month (since 2000)
- Website: samarindakota.go.id

The Mayor of Samarinda (Indonesian: Wali Kota Samarinda) is the executive head of the Indonesian city of Samarinda, as well as Government of Samarinda City (Indonesian: Pemerintah Kota Samarinda). The current officeholder is Andi Harun, a member of Gerindra Party, since 26 February 2021.

During Indonesian liberal democracy period from 1950 to 1959, Samarinda was governed by residents as capital of East Kalimantan Residency from 1950 to 1957, then governors or regional head from 1957 to 1959 as capital of East Kalimantan Province since 1957. In addition, Samarinda became the capital of the Special Region of Kutai ruled by Sultan of Kutai Kartanegara, Aji Muhammad Parikesit from 1953 until 1956.

The first inaugural mayor of Samarinda is Soedjono Anton Joedhotedjoprawiro from 1960 to 1961, (Note: Soedjono served as mayor for twenty months.) after Samarinda was given status of township (Indonesian: kotapraja) on 21 January 1960, (Note: The township status was passed on 26 June 1959, and enacted on 4 July 1959. However, the official ceremony was just held on 21 January 1960 to commemorate the arrival of Bugis people from Wajo in an area now called Samarinda Seberang on 21 January 1668. The event took place with the signing of the official handover document from Sultan Parikesit of Kutai to Cpt. Soedjono, who became the first mayor of Samarinda Township, which signified the formation of the Government of Samarinda City.) in which celebrated as the city anniversary ever since. Afterwards, in the penultimate year of Indonesian guided democracy period, Samarinda was given status of municipality (Indonesian: kotamadya) in 1965. Finally, after the fall of Indonesian new order period, Samarinda’s status as a municipality was reaffirmed and redefined as city proper (Indonesian: kota)—synonymously known as autonomous city (Indonesian: kota otonom)—under the decentralization reforms during the presidency of B. J. Habibie in 1999.

The longest-serving mayor has been Kadrie Oening (1967–1980) who was in office for nearly thirteen years (two successive five-year terms), with the interval from 1972 to 1975 served as acting mayor for approximately three years. The next longest-serving mayors have been Abdul Waris Husain (1985–1995) and Achmad Amins (2000–2010) whom was in office uninterrupted for ten years (two consecutive five-year terms), and Syaharie Jaang (2010–2015 and 2016–2021) who was in office for a total of ten years (two successive five-year terms). The shortest terms in office since 1960 has been Sugeng Chairuddin served as daily acting mayor for one week (from 18 to 25 February 2021). Meanwhile, the shortest-serving mayor has been Iswanto Rukin who was in office for under one month (from 11 February to 7 March 1985) due to passing away shortly after taking office.

Overall, Samarinda has been governed by ten mayors and five vice mayors, with three acting mayors. Out of ten mayors, Kadrie Oening was the first and only mayor known to have been born in Samarinda. Extensively, out of three acting mayor, Meiliana is the only acting mayor born in the city. Additionally, Syaharie Jaang (born in 1964) is the first mayor born after the city government's inception in 1960.

== Mayors ==
=== Mayor of Samarinda Township (1960–1965) ===
1. Soedjono Anton Joedhotedjoprawiro (1960–1961)
2. Ngoedio (1961–1965)

=== Mayor of Samarinda Municipality (1965–1999) ===
2. Ngoedio (1965–1967)
3. M. Kadrie Oening (1967–1980, acting during 1972–1975)
4. Anang Hasyim (1980–1985)
5. Iswanto Rukin (1985)
6. Abdul Waris Husain (1985–1995)
7. Lukman Said (1995–1999)

=== Mayor of Samarinda (since 1999) ===
7. Lukman Said (1999–2000)
8. Achmad Amins (2000–2010)
9. Syaharie Jaang (2010–2015 and 2016–2021)
10. Andi Harun (incumbent since 2021)

=== Acting mayors ===
- Meiliana (2015–2016)
- Zairin Zain (2018) as temporary acting mayor
- Sugeng Chairuddin (2021) as daily acting mayor

== See also ==
- Samarinda
- List of incumbent regional heads and deputy regional heads in East Kalimantan
