= Andi Harun =

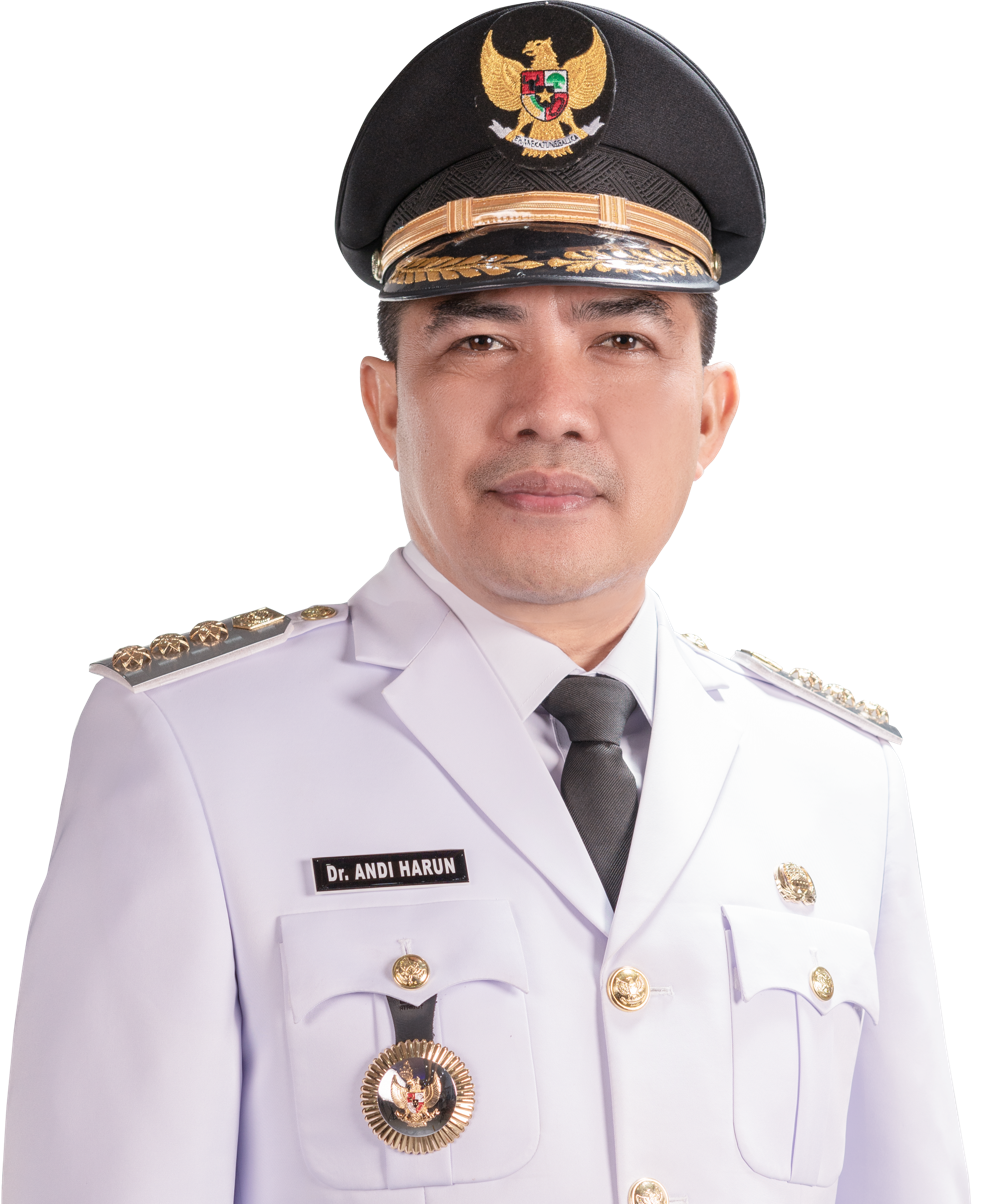
- Official picture, 2021

10th Mayor of Samarinda
- Incumbent
- Assumed office 26 February 2021
- President: Joko Widodo; Prabowo Subianto
- Governor: Isran Noor; Akmal Malik (acting); Rudy Mas'ud
- Vice Mayor: Rusmadi Wongso (2021–2025); Saefuddin Zuhri (2025–present)
- Preceded by: Syaharie Jaang

Member of East Kalimantan DPRD
- In office 2 September 2019 – 6 October 2020
- In office 1999 – 4 September 2018

Personal details
- Born: 12 December 1972 (age 53) Bone, South Sulawesi, Indonesia
- Party: Gerindra
- Other political affiliations: Golkar (2013–2016); Patriot Party (2006–2013); PAN (1998–2006)
- Spouse: Rinda Wahyuni (m. 1995)
- Children: 3
- Education: UVRI Makassar (S.T.); UMI Makassar (S.H. and Dr.); Mulawarman University (M.E.)

Andi Harun (born 12 December 1972) is an Indonesian politician of the Gerindra Party who has served as the mayor of Samarinda, East Kalimantan since 2021. Before being elected as mayor, he had been elected for five terms as a member of East Kalimantan's Provincial Regional House of Representatives.

== Early life ==
Andi Harun was born in Bone Regency, in South Sulawesi, on 12 December 1972. His parents were rice farmers and merchants at a local market. After completing high school in Sinjai, he received a degree in mining engineering at the Indonesian Muslim University in Makassar. He briefly moved to Jakarta after graduating before getting a job in mining and moved again to East Kalimantan in 1995.

He would later receive a bachelor's degree in law from the Indonesian Muslim University and a master's degree in economics from Mulawarman University.

== Career ==
In 1998, Harun took part in student protests in Jakarta leading up to the fall of Suharto, before returning again to East Kalimantan. There, he took part as a candidate in the 1999 legislative election and won a seat in the Provincial Regional House of Representatives as a member of the National Mandate Party (PAN). He was reelected to the body in 2004, still as a PAN member, and became its deputy speaker. During his time at PAN, he was deputy chairman of the provincial branch between 1998 and 2001, and chairman between 2001 and 2006. For the 2009, he moved to the Patriot Party and retained his seat in the legislature.

Harun ran in the 2010 mayoral election for Samarinda with the support of Patriot, Golkar, and Gerindra, placing third out of seven candidates with 57,979 votes (19%). By 2013, he had moved to Golkar and became the party's branch chairman in Bontang the following year. He was elected for a fourth term in the provincial DPRD in 2014 as a Golkar member. In the middle of this term, he moved to Gerindra, and following a series of internal disputes and lawsuits Golkar replaced him in the provincial parliament on 4 September 2018. He was elected for a fifth term in 2019 as a Gerindra legislator, becoming deputy speaker for a second time.

In the 2020 Samarinda mayoral election, Harun ran again, with PDI-P cadre Rusmadi as running mate. The ticket won the election after securing 102,592 votes (36.12%) in the three-way race. Harun was sworn in as mayor on 26 February 2021. During his term as mayor, the city developed a new water treatment facility for freshwater needs and worked with the provincial government to improve infrastructure and housing in the city's slums. He also started the construction of Samarinda Tunnel. He ran for reelection unopposed in the 2024 election, securing 88.1% of votes against an empty ballot.

== Family ==
Harun married Rinda Wahyuni in 1995, and the couple has three children. His eldest child Muhammad Afif Reyhan became a member of the Samarinda City Regional House of Representatives in 2021 as a Gerindra member replacing a resigning member.
