= 2024 Samarinda mayoral election =

- 27 November 2024
- Turnout: 59.77%
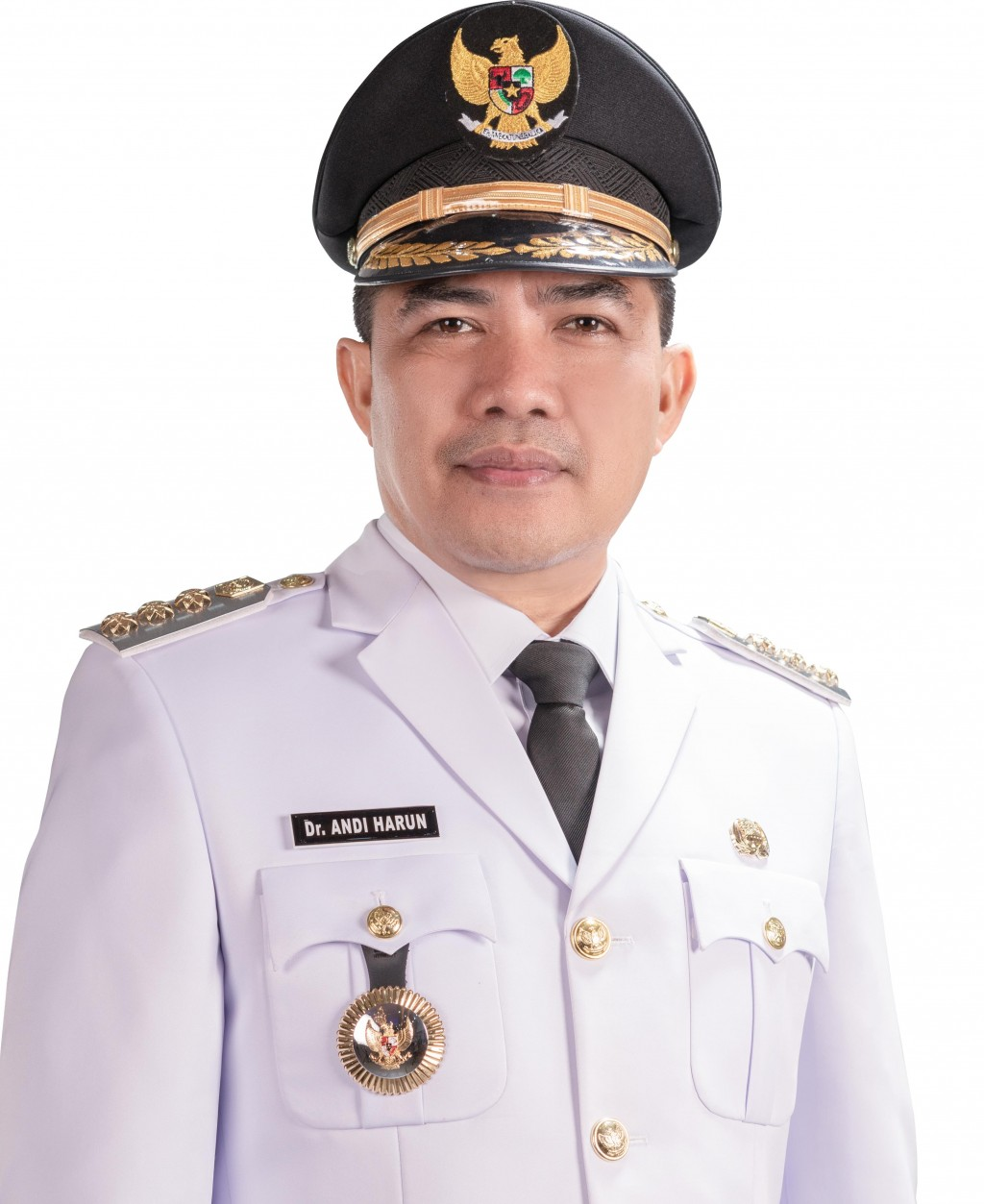

Candidate	Andi Harun	Blank box
Party	Gerindra
Running mate	Saefuddin Zuhri
Popular vote	306,392	41,301
Percentage	88.12%	11.88%
Mayor before election
Andi Harun
Gerindra
Elected mayor
Andi Harun
Gerindra

The 2024 Samarinda mayoral election was held on 27 November 2024 as part of nationwide local elections to elect the mayor and vice mayor of Samarinda, East Kalimantan for a five-year term. The previous election was held in 2020. Mayor Andi Harun of the Gerindra Party was re-elected unopposed with 88% of the vote. Blank ballots accounted for 11% of all valid votes cast.

== Electoral system ==
The election, like other local elections in 2024, follow the first-past-the-post system where the candidate with the most votes wins the election, even if they do not win a majority. It is possible for a candidate to run uncontested, in which case the candidate is still required to win a majority of votes "against" an "empty box" option. Should the candidate fail to do so, the election will be repeated on a later date.

== Candidates ==
According to electoral regulations, in order to qualify for the election, candidates were required to secure support from a political party or a coalition of parties controlling 9 seats (20 percent of all seats) in the Samarinda Regional House of Representatives (DPRD). The Gerindra Party, with 9 seats, is the only party eligible to nominate a candidate without forming a coalition. Candidates may alternatively demonstrate support to run as an independent in form of photocopies of identity cards, which in Samarinda's case corresponds to 45,332 copies. Incumbent mayor Andi Harun registered in this manner, submitting nearly 49 thousand proofs of support to the General Elections Commission (KPU) to run as an independent.

=== Potential ===
The following are individuals who have either been publicly mentioned as a potential candidate by a political party in the DPRD, publicly declared their candidacy with press coverage, or considered as a potential candidate by media outlets:

- Andi Harun (Gerindra), incumbent mayor.
- Rusmadi Wongso (PDI-P), incumbent vice mayor.
- Zairin Zain, former acting mayor of Samarinda, former head of the development bureau at the East Kalimantan provincial government.

== Political map ==
Following the 2024 Indonesian legislative election, nine political parties are represented in the Samarinda DPRD:

Political parties	Seat count
Great Indonesia Movement Party (Gerindra)	9 / 45
Party of Functional Groups (Golkar)	8 / 45
Indonesian Democratic Party of Struggle (PDI-P)	6 / 45
NasDem Party	5 / 45
Prosperous Justice Party (PKS)	5 / 45
Democratic Party (Demokrat)	4 / 45
National Mandate Party (PAN)	4 / 45
National Awakening Party (PKB)	2 / 45
United Development Party (PPP)	1 / 45
Gelora Party	1 / 45

== Results ==
Candidate	Running mate	Party	Votes	%
Andi Harun	Saefuddin Zuhri	Gerindra Party	306,392	88.12
Blank box			41,301	11.88
Total			347,693	100.00
Valid votes			347,693	95.03
Invalid/blank votes			18,173	4.97
Total votes			365,866	100.00
Registered voters/turnout			612,072	59.77
Source: KPU
