= Sugiri Sancoko =

Indonesian politician (born 1971)

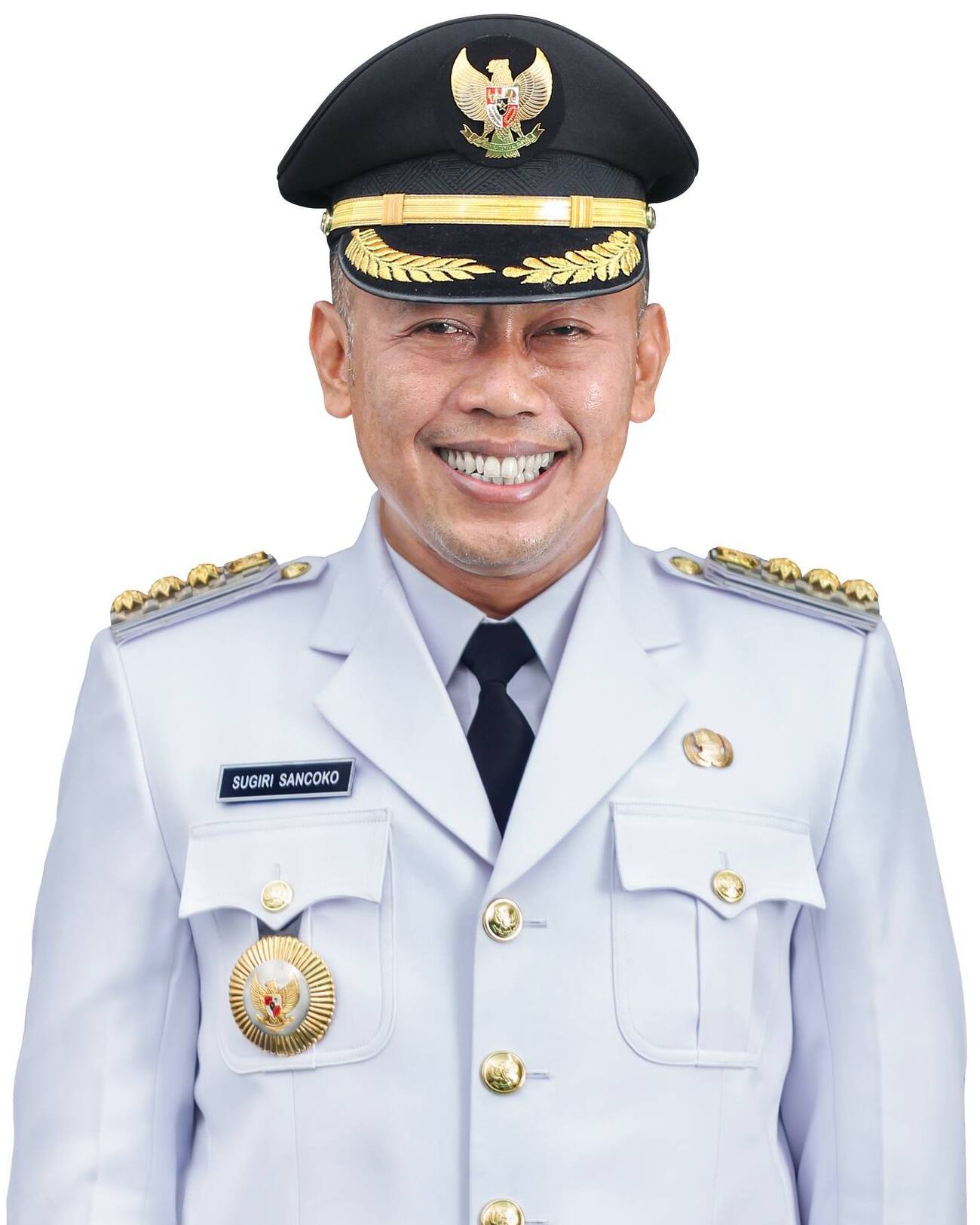
- Sugiri as regent

Regent of Ponorogo
- In office 26 February 2021 – 7 November 2025
- Preceded by: Ipong Muchlissoni
- Succeeded by: Lisdyarita

Member of East Java DPRD
- In office 31 August 2009 – 2015

Personal details
- Born: 26 February 1971 (age 55) Ponorogo, East Java, Indonesia
- Party: PDI-P; Demokrat (until 2015)

Sugiri Sancoko (born 26 February 1971) is an Indonesian politician of the Indonesian Democratic Party of Struggle. He served as the regent of Ponorogo Regency in East Java between 2021 and his arrest by the Corruption Eradication Commission in November 2025, and previously was member of East Java's provincial legislature from 2009 to 2015. He is currently serving a prison sentence for a corruption case.

== Early life and education ==
Sugiri Sancoko was born in the hamlet of Darat, in Sampung district of Ponorogo Regency, on 26 February 1971. His parents, Sinto and Situn, were farmers, and Sugiri was the sixth of seven children. He completed elementary school at his home village, and later enrolled at a trade school in Ponorogo where he graduated in 1990. He later obtained a bachelor's degree in economics in 2006 and a master's in 2016.

== Career ==
After his graduation, Sugiri worked as a newspaper journalist for some time within the Jawa Pos Group. He then entered the billboard business. In 2009, he was elected to the East Java Regional House of Representatives as a Demokrat candidate, and was re-elected for a second term in 2014.

In 2015, Sugiri secured the support of Golkar, Demokrat, PKS and Hanura to run as regent in Ponorogo, winning 205,587 votes (36.8%) but losing to Ipong Muchlissoni in a four-way race. According to Sugiri, after his 2015 loss, he travelled to Aceh and invested in an unsuccessful maize plantation. He also weighed running as a vice-regent candidate in Banyuasin Regency in South Sumatra (which had a significant number of migrants from Ponorogo), but ultimately did not do so.

Sugiri ran again against Muchlissoni in Ponorogo's 2020 election, with PDI-P, PAN, PPP and Hanura's support. Sugiri secured 352,047 votes (61.7%) and defeated Muchlissoni. He was sworn in as regent on 26 February 2021. He would be reelected in the 2024 regency election, again defeating Muchlissoni with 300,790 votes (54.2%).

As Ponorogo's regent, Sugiri stated that his focus would be to develop tourism in Ponorogo, claiming that industrial development in Ponorogo was extremely difficult due to geographical constraints.

=== Corruption case ===
On the evening of 7 November 2025, the Corruption Eradication Commission (KPK) arrested Sugiri on charges of receiving bribes for government positions and construction projects related to Ponorogo's public hospital. His vice regent Lisdyarita took over his post and became acting regent on 10 November. According to a KPK spokesperson, Sugiri had accumulated debts to fund his 2024 reelection campaign, and used funds from the bribes to pay it back. The corruption case held its first trial on 10 April 2026. On 14 August 2026, the Surabaya Anti-Corruption Court sentenced Sugiri to 6.5 years in prison, plus a Rp 300 million fine.

== Personal life ==
He is married to Susilowati, and the couple has three children.
