= Amin (politician) =

Indonesian politician (born 1953)

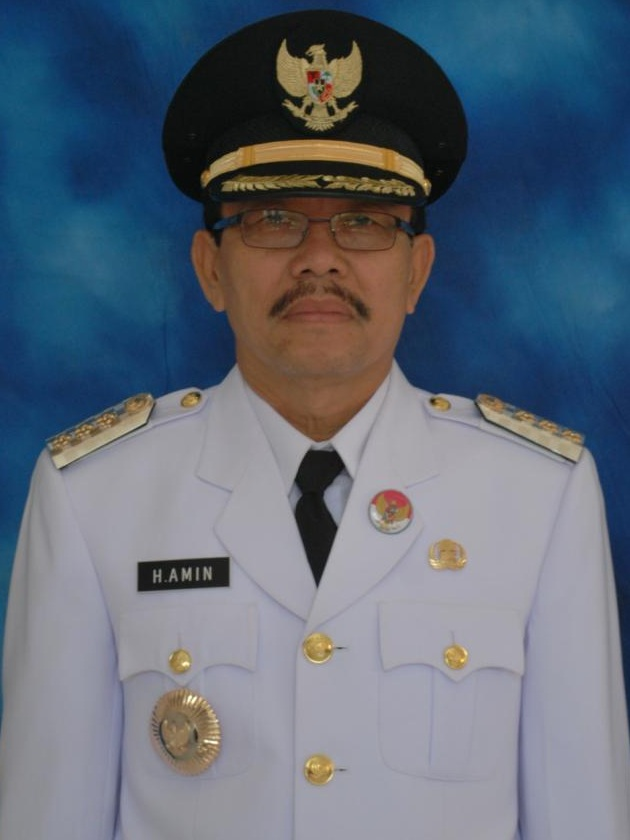

Regent of Ponorogo
- In office 12 August 2010 – 12 August 2015
- Preceded by: Muhadi Suyono
- Succeeded by: Ipong Muchlissoni

Personal details
- Born: 7 August 1953 (age 72) Ponorogo, East Java, Indonesia

Amin (born 7 August 1953) is an Indonesian businessman and former politician. He served as the regent of Ponorogo in East Java for one term between 2010 and 2015, and previously served as Ponorogo's vice regent from 2005 to 2010.

== Early life and education ==
Amin was born on 7 August 1953 in Tosanan Kauman village in Ponorogo Regency. He completed elementary school in 1967, but did not enroll in middle school until he was an adult. He received his middle school diploma in 1987 and high school diploma in 2002, later receiving a bachelor's in law from Ponorogo's Merdeka University in 2010. He was also a member of the GP Ansor youth organization, heading its branch in his home village.

== Career ==
=== Ponorogo politics ===
Prior to entering electoral politics, Amin had been head of his home village in Ponorogo for 15 years from 1990 to 2005. In 2005, Amin ran as the running mate of Muhadi Suyono in Ponorogo's first direct regency election, the pair being supported by the National Awakening Party. Suyono and Amin won 222,647 votes (45.2%), defeating four other candidate pairs. Amin contested the 2010 regency election as a regent candidate supported by Golkar and PKNU, securing 46.3 percent of votes and defeating Suyono in the three-way race. He was sworn in on 12 August 2010.

Amin's tenure as regent saw the construction of the Ponorogo City Center shopping mall, the renovation of the regency's main alun-alun (city square), and the development of an integrated public service building for municipal services. Amin in 2012 opposed a central government move to cut fuel subsidies, publicly signing a student petition against it. His tenure also saw his deputy, Yuni Widyaningsih, arrested for corruption and sentenced to six years in prison. In 2015, Amin ran for reelection, but was defeated by Ipong Muchlissoni with Amin placing third in the four-way race with 22.2 percent of votes.

=== Later career ===
In February 2020, Amin was questioned as a witness by the Corruption Eradication Commission related to an investigation on Nganjuk former regent Taufiqurrahman. He was named as a potential candidate in the 2020 regency election, but ultimately did not run in the election.

As of 2024, Amin was no longer active in politics, although he operated a poultry farm in Ponorogo and owned a palm oil plantation in Borneo. He was also a commissioner at a cigarette company. In 2025, the Ponorogo Regency government announced that they would name the public service building (constructed during Amin's term in 2015) after him.
