= Ipong Muchlissoni =

Indonesian politician (born 1967)

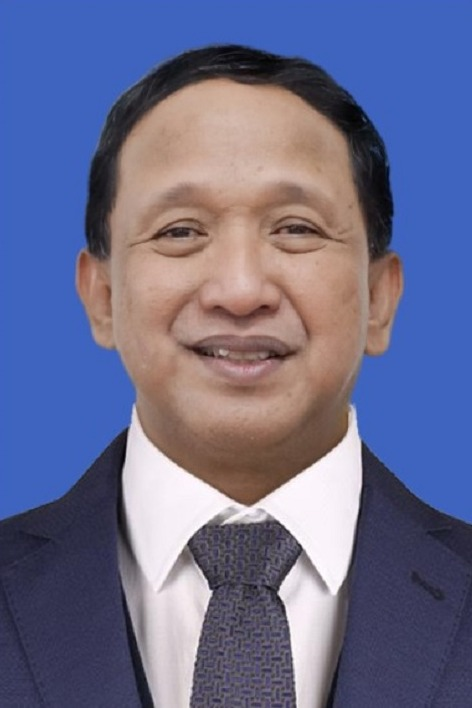
- Election portrait, 2024

Regent of Ponorogo
- In office 17 February 2016 – 17 February 2021
- Preceded by: Amin
- Succeeded by: Sugiri Sancoko

Member of East Kalimantan DPRD
- In office 1999–2009

Personal details
- Born: 29 April 1967 (age 59) Lamongan, East Java, Indonesia

Ipong Muchlissoni (born 29 April 1967) is an Indonesian politician of the Nasdem Party. He served as the regent of Ponorogo Regency in East Java from 2016 to 2021, and as a member of East Kalimantan's Regional House of Representatives between 1999 and 2009.

== Early life ==
Ipong Muchlissoni was born in Lamongan Regency, in East Java, on 29 April 1967. His grandfather, Subandi, had been a Nahdlatul Ulama figure in Ponorogo Regency. During his youth, he migrated to East Kalimantan for work, and he obtained his degree there at Mulawarman University.

== Career ==
In East Kalimantan, Muchlissoni initially worked as a human resources staffer, and in 2000 he became a commissioner for a company. He entered politics in 1999, being elected to East Kalimantan's Regional House of Representatives and he was reelected for a second term in 2004. In 2013, Muchlissoni ran as a vice-gubernatorial candidate in East Kalimantan's 2013 election with Imdaad Hamid as gubernatorial candidate. The pair lost to Awang Faroek Ishak. He had also unsuccessfully run as mayor of Samarinda in 2010.

=== Regent ===
Muchlissoni in 2015 ran in the election for Ponorogo Regency with the backing of Nasdem Party and PAN, campaigning on infrastructure repairs and agricultural development. He won the four-way race with 219,916 votes (39.35%), defeating incumbent regent Amin and Demokrat candidate Sugiri Sancoko. He was sworn in as regent on 17 February 2016.

As regent, Muchlissoni in 2018 announced a ban on motorcycle rickshaws, citing tourism reasons and pushing for motorcycle rickshaw drivers to convert to cycle rickshaws. Late in his tenure, he obtained a Rp 200 billion (USD 13 million) low-interest loan from the central government for infrastructure projects, citing budget allocation cuts that year due to the COVID-19 pandemic. In 2020, he ran for reelection, but lost to Sugiri Sancoko with Muchlissoni securing 218,073 votes (38.3%).

After his 2020 loss, Muchlissoni ran as a Nasdem candidate in the 2024 Indonesian legislative election in East Java's 1st electoral district (Surabaya and Sidoarjo), but failed to win a seat after securing 55,160 votes. He ran again against Sugiri in the 2024 Indonesian local elections, and during election debates he claimed that the quantity of good roads in Ponorogo increased during his tenure but declined during Sugiri's. Muchlissoni again lost in the 2024 election, with 254,618 votes (45.8%).

== Personal life ==
Muchlissoni is a car collector, and in a State Officials' Wealth Report in 2015 he reported that he owned 15 different cars along with 3 motorbikes. He is married to Sri Wahyuni, who served in the House of Representatives as a Nasdem member between 2019 and 2024 but was not reelected in 2024. One of the couple's children, Zata Mahardika, ran for a seat in the 2024 election also as a Nasdem candidate, but also failed to win a seat along with Wahyuni and Muchlissoni.
