= Aji Raden Sayid Mohammad =

First Mayor Of Balikpapan

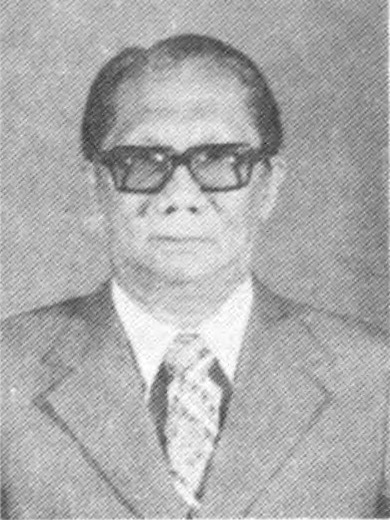

Mayor of Balikpapan
- In office 1960–1963
- President: Sukarno
- Governor: A.P.T. Pranoto; Abdoel Moeis Hassan
- Preceded by: None
- Succeeded by: Bambang Soetikno

Member of People's Consultative Assembly
- In office 1982–1987
- Constituency: East Kalimantan
- In office 1977–1982

Personal details
- Born: 15 December 1918 (age 107) Tenggarong, Dutch East Indies
- Party: Indonesian National Association (1946–1950); PNI; Golkar
- Profession: Politician

H. Aji Raden Sayid Mohammad, commonly abbreviated as A.R.S. Mohammad or A.R.S. Muhammad (born 15 December 1918, death date unknown), was the first Mayor of Balikpapan. He was appointed by Governor A.P.T. Pranoto in 1960 and served until 1963, when he was replaced by Lieutenant Colonel Bambang Sutikno after being ousted by the Commander of the IX/Mulawarman Military Region, Brigadier General Soehario Padmodiwirio. (Note: Magenda made a mistake by writing Zainal Arifin as Mohammad's successor)

During the National Revolution, he joined the Indonesian National Association and later became a member of the Indonesian National Party (PNI) after INI merged with the party. During the New Order, he then joined Golkar. After stepping down as mayor, Mohammad served in various government positions at the provincial level before retiring in 1975. After retirement, he was reappointed as the Head of the Regional Regional Inspectorate (Irwilda) of East Kalimantan and became a member of MPR. He was assigned as the Chief Assistant of Governor Abdul Wahab Sjahranie.

== Life and early career ==
Mohammad was born in Tenggarong on 15 December 1918. He had Arabic ancestry and came from the background of Kutai nobility, as indicated by his title, Aji Raden. He previously held the title of Aji Bambang. He was the second son of Aji Bambang Husein Baraqbah and Aji Siti, the daughter of Sultan Aji Muhammad Sulaiman. Mohammad began his education in HIS and graduated in 1935. He then continued his studies at OSVIA Makassar and finished them in 1940.

Upon graduation, he worked as pangreh praja (Inlands Bestuur) employee for Kutai Sultanate in Balikpapan. During the Indonesian National Revolution, Mohammad held various positions such as head of subdistrict (onderdistrict) and district as well as district chieftain (wedana) in Kutai Ulu. In 1946, he joined the Indonesian National Association and served as the second secretary in the party.

After the transfer of sovereignty, Mohammad joined PNI after INI merged with the party in 1950. He served as the Vice Chairman of the PNI branch in Samarinda and a plenary member of the party's East Kalimantan Regional Council (DD). He also ran for the 1955 Indonesian Constitutional Assembly election as a Constitutional Assembly candidate of PNI from East Kalimantan. He continued his career in civil service by serving in various positions such as district head (kepala distrik) in Kutai, district head assigned to the Ministry of Home Affairs and Head of Special Region of Kutai, and district chieftain (wedana) in East and South Kutai (based in Balikpapan).

== Mayor of Balikpapan ==
After the Special Region of Kutai dissolved on 20 January 1960, the area was divided into three regions, one of them was Balikpapan Municipality. A.P.T. Pranoto appointed Mohammad as Mayor of Balikpapan. His appointment as mayor was undergone by Pranoto to strengthen the political position of the Kutai nobility. His tenure did not last long. In 1963, Mohammad was ousted by Colonel Soehario and was replaced by Soehario's chosen person, Lt. Col Bambang Sutikno. Soehario took that action to enhance his political power and undermine both Abdoel Moeis Hassan and the PNI, which was based in Samarinda. Mohammad, as a party member, was affected by this power shift.

== Post-Mayoral career ==
After ceasing to be mayor, Mohammad became an employee of the East Kalimantan Governor's Office. He briefly worked as the Main Assistant to the Governor for Development (on par with the Deputy Governor) in 1969 during the tenure of Governor Abdoel Wahab Sjahranie until his retirement in 1975. His appointment was made to undermine PNI's strength, which gained more power during Abdoel Moeis Hassan's tenure within the provincial government. Besides, he also worked as the head of Irwilda of East Kalimantan from 1970 to 1973 before being reappointed and served until 1976. Mohammad was also elected as a member of MPR, representing Golkar in 1977 and 1982.

In addition to his career in government, he also became a member of the East Kalimantan Korpri Advisory Board in 1972, a member of the East Kalimantan Golkar Advisory Council Level I in 1980, and was involved in scouting by becoming Daily Chairman of the Advisory Council of the East Kalimantan Regional Scout Movement.

== Legacy ==
His name is immortalized as a street name in Klandasan Ulu subdistrict, Balikpapan.

== Bibliographies ==
- Amin, Mohammad Asli (1979). Dari Swapraja ke Kabupaten Kutai (PDF). Jakarta: Departemen Pendidikan dan Kebudayaan RI.
- Kementerian Penerangan (1956). Kumpulan Peraturan-Peraturan untuk Pemilihan Konstituante. Kementerian Penerangan.
- Lembaga Pemilihan Umum (1977). Ringkasan Riwayat Hidup dan Riwayat Perjuangan Anggota Majelis Permusyawaratan Rakyat Hasil Pemilihan Umum Tahun 1977. Jakarta: Lembaga Pemilihan Umum.
- Lembaga Pemilihan Umum (1982). Ringkasan Riwayat Hidup dan Riwayat Perjuangan Anggota Majelis Permusyawaratan Rakyat Hasil Pemilihan Umum Tahun 1982 yang Bukan Anggota Dewan Perwakilan Rakyat. Jakarta: Lembaga Pemilihan Umum.
- Magenda, Burhan Djabier (2010). East Kalimantan: The Decline of a Commercial Aristocracy. Singapura: Equinox Publishing. ISBN 978-602-8397-21-6.
- Panitia Pemilihan Daerah Tingkat I Kalimantan Timur (1977). Pelaksanaan Pemilihan Umum Tahun 1977 di Kalimantan Timur.
- Sarip, Muhammad (2023). Histori Kutai: Peradaban Nusantara di Timur Kalimantan dari Zaman Mulawarman hingga Era Republik. Samarinda: RV Pustaka Horizon.

Political offices
Preceded by None	Mayor of Balikpapan; 1960–1963	Succeeded by Bambang Soetikno
