= Sri Wahyuni =

Indonesian politician (born 1967)

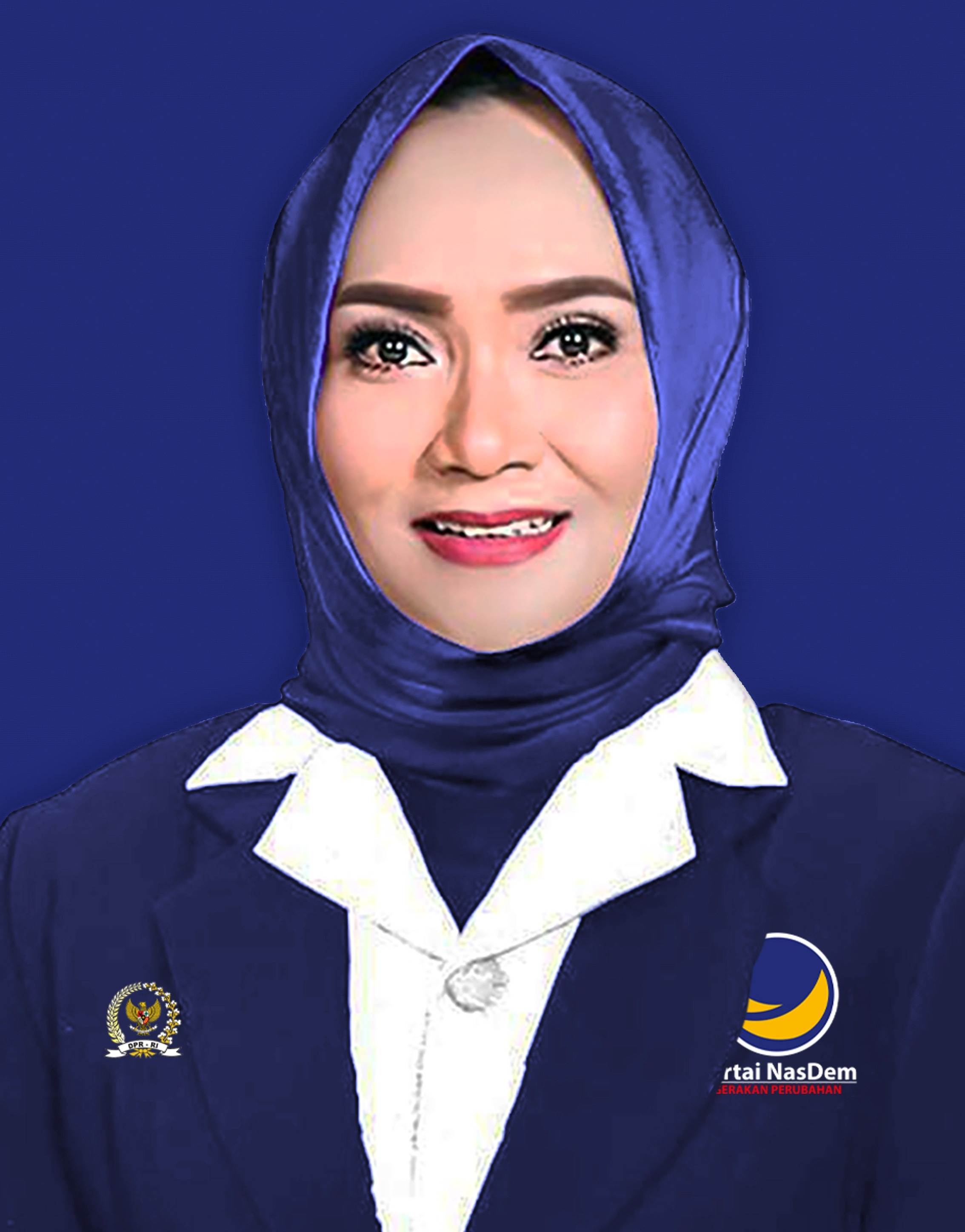

Member of the House of Representatives
- In office 1 October 2019 – 1 October 2024
- Constituency: East Java VII
- Majority: 161,102

Personal details
- Born: 8 June 1967 (age 59) Tabalong, South Kalimantan, Indonesia
- Party: Nasdem

Sri Wahyuni (born 8 June 1967) is an Indonesian politician of the Nasdem Party. She served as a member of the House of Representatives from 2019 to 2024.

== Early life ==
Wahyuni was born in Tabalong Regency, in South Kalimantan, on 8 June 1967. She studied there, graduating from a public high school at the regency seat in Tanjung in 1986. She received her bachelor's degree in 1995 from the 17 August University in Samarinda, East Kalimantan.

== Career ==
In the 2019 Indonesian legislative election, Wahyuni ran for a seat in the House of Representatives as a Nasdem Party candidate, in East Java's 7th electoral district (Pacitan, Ponorogo, Trenggalek, Magetan and Ngawi). She secured a seat after winning 161,102 votes. Within the legislature, she was appointed to the Fifth Commission. As a legislator, Wahyuni called for the government to implement price monitoring on public transportation during the mudik season, and in Ponorogo Regency specifically, she promoted a tourists' village which opened in 2022. In 2020, during the COVID-19 pandemic, she called for the government to delay the repatriation of Indonesian overseas workers to slow down the spread of the disease. She later sued a news website which she claimed had represented her statement as denying the repatriation of the workers.

She ran for a second term in the 2024 election from the same district, securing 81,260 votes, but failed to win a seat with Nasdem losing its sole seat in the district.

== Personal life ==
Wahyuni's husband, Ipong Muchlissoni, served as the regent of Ponorogo Regency in East Java from 2016 to 2021. In 2024, Muchlissoni along with their son M. Zata Mahardika also ran for DPR seats as Nasdem candidates, but both also failed to win seats.
