= Rahmad Mas'ud =

Indonesian politician (born 1976)

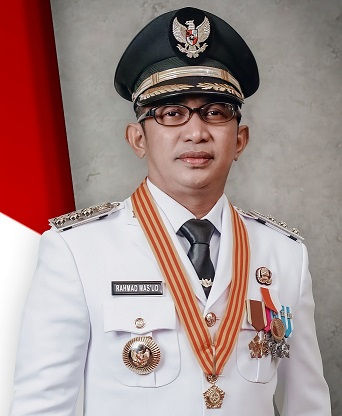
- Official portrait

Mayor of Balikpapan
- Incumbent
- Assumed office 31 May 2021
- Preceded by: Rizal Effendi

Vice Mayor of Balikpapan
- In office 30 May 2016 – 30 May 2021
- Mayor: Rizal Effendi

Personal details
- Born: 12 May 1976 (age 50) Balikpapan, East Kalimantan, Indonesia
- Party: Golkar

Rahmad Mas'ud (born 12 May 1976) is an Indonesian politician of the Golkar party and businessman who is the current mayor of Balikpapan, East Kalimantan, serving since 2021. He was previously the city's vice mayor between 2016 and 2021.

== Early life ==
Rahmad Mas'ud was born on 12 May 1976 in Balikpapan. He was the son of Mas'ud, and he had seven siblings. He studied in the city, graduating from a state-funded high school there (State High School No. 3 Balikpapan) in 1995. He then studied at the Maritime Training Center in Makassar, but one year into his studies, his father died and the younger Mas'ud returned to Balikpapan to take over the family's log driving and shipping business. He would later obtain a bachelors degree from Tri Dharma University in Balikpapan in 2016, and later a masters degree from Mulawarman University in 2022. Mas'ud graduated from Mulawarman simultaneously with four of his siblings, and they held a graduation party to celebrate the occasion.

== Career ==
As he continued to work on his shipping business, the company formed a partnership with Pertamina and became the sole provider of bunkering services to Pertamina's ships in the Balikpapan area. He also joined Pemuda Pancasila in 2000 and became a local leader of the group. Additionally, he had a stint as manager of the Persiba Balikpapan football club between 2000 and 2004, the club being promoted to the national Premier Division during his time there.

In the 2015 mayoral election for Balikpapan, Mas'ud ran as the running mate to incumbent mayor Rizal Effendi, and the pair was elected with 116,113 votes. They were sworn into office on 30 May 2016. He ran for mayor in the 2020 mayoral election in an uncontested race, winning 160,929 votes (62.5%) against the blank option. He was sworn in as mayor on 31 May 2021. After his inauguration, he stated his priorities as mayor to include flood mitigation and improvements in the city's drinking water supply, in addition to modernizing the city's street lighting.

He is a member of Golkar, and he was elected as the party's Balikpapan chairman for 2021–2026.

== Family ==
He is married to Nurlena, and the couple has seven children. Of his siblings, several are active in politics, namely Rudy Mas'ud (member of the House of Representatives), Hasanuddin Mas'ud (speaker of the East Kalimantan Regional House of Representatives), and Abdul Gafur Mas'ud (regent of Penajam North Paser).
