= Mulawarman University =

Public university in Samarinda, East Kalimantan, Indonesia

Universitas Mulawarman
- Universitas Mulawarman
- Motto: The First State University of East Kalimantan
- Type: Public university
- Established: September 27, 1962
- Rector: Ir. H. Abdunnur
- Faculty: 928
- Administrative staff: 541
- Students: 35,268
- Undergraduates: 32,898
- Postgraduates: 2,254
- Doctoral students: 116
- Other students: 42
- Location: Jalan Kuaro, Kampus Gunung Kelua, Samarinda, Indonesia 75117, Samarinda, East Kalimantan, Indonesia; 0°28′6.3732″S 117°9′14.778″E
- Campus: Gunung Kelua, Pahlawan, Banggeris, and Flores
- Colors: Golden yellow
- Nickname: UNMUL
- Website: www.unmul.ac.id

The Universitas Mulawarman is a public university located in Samarinda, East Kalimantan, Indonesia. It was established on September 27, 1962, making it the oldest tertiary education institution in East Kalimantan. With more than 35,000 students, Universitas Mulawarman is the university with the most students in Kalimantan. Its main campus is in Gunung Kelua, while other campuses are in Pahlawan Road, Banggeris Street and Flores Street of Samarinda.

== History ==
The name "Mulawarman" is taken from the legendary king Mulavarman Nala Dewa of the Kutai Martadipura Kingdom who ruled in the 4th-5th century CE, historically one of the earliest Hindu kingdoms in Indonesia, located in current Kutai Kartanegara Regency, East Kalimantan.

=== Beginnings ===
On June 6, 1962, the Governor of East Kalimantan Province, Aji Pangeran Tumenggung Pranoto, founded Perguruan Tinggi Mulawarman (Mulawarman College), located in Samarinda. Then the Indonesian Ministry of Education and Culture approved the establishment as Universitas Mulawarman on September 28, 1962 and officially confirmed by the President on April 23, 1963. The date of September 27, 1962 was set as the date of the founding of the Universitas Mulawarman.

At first the Universitas Mulawarman had four faculties: Faculty of State and Trade Administration, Faculty of Agriculture, Faculty of Forestry and Faculty of Mining in Balikpapan. Only the Faculty of State and Trade Administration could be started at the opening in 1962, the Faculty of Agriculture followed in 1964. In 1966, the Faculty of State and Trade Administration was split into the Faculty of Social and Political Sciences and Faculty of Economics.

=== 1970s-1980s ===
Due to difficulty to find teaching staff, the Faculty of Mining, in Balikpapan, was closed in 1970. In 1978, the Samarinda Teaching and Education Sciences Institute was integrated into Universitas Mulawarman as the Faculty of Teaching and Education Sciences on March 20. Thus since September 7, 1982, there were five faculties in Universitas Mulawarman: Faculty of Agriculture, Faculty of Economics, Faculty of Forestry, Faculty of Teaching and Education Sciences, and Faculty of Social and Political Sciences.

On December 3, 1985, Universitas Mulawarman Polytechnic was established.

=== 1990s-2000s ===
Since the 1990s, Universitas Mulawarman established new faculties: Faculty of Fisheries and Marine Sciences in 1996, Faculty of Mathematics and Natural Sciences in 2001, Faculty of Medicine in 2001, Faculty of Law in 2005, Faculty of Public Health in 2005, Faculty of Engineering in 2007, Faculty of Pharmacy in 2008, and Faculty of Cultural Studies in 2009.

On April 28, 1997, Universitas Mulawarman Polytechnic was formed into Samarinda State Polytechnic, separated from Universitas Mulawarman.

=== 2010s onwards ===
In 2010, the university established the Faculty of Information and Communication Technology.

Universitas Mulawarman rector is Prof. Dr. H. Zamruddin Hasid, S.E. since 2010.

== Schools ==
The university has several courses in 15 faculties and program:

- Faculty of Agriculture
1. Agribusiness (Bachelor's degree)
2. Agricultural technology (Bachelor's degree)
3. Agrotechnology (Bachelor's degree)
4. Animal husbandry (Bachelor's degree)
5. Plant cultivation (Diploma)
- Faculty of Cultural Studies
1. English literature (Bachelor's degree)
2. Indonesian literature (Bachelor's degree)
3. Ethnomusicology (Bachelor's degree)
- Faculty of Economics
1. Accounting (Diploma, Bachelor's degree, and professional degree)
2. Economics (Bachelor's degree)
3. Management (Bachelor's degree and master's degree)
4. Islamic Economics (Bachelor's degree)
- Faculty of Engineering
1. Chemical engineering (Bachelor's degree)
2. Civil engineering (Bachelor's degree)
3. Environmental engineering (Bachelor's degree)
4. Mining engineering (Diploma and bachelor's degree)
5. Industrial engineering (Bachelor's degree)
6. Electronic engineering (Bachelor's degree)
7. Mechanical engineering (Bachelor's degree)
8. Architecture (Bachelor's degree)
9. Geological engineering (Bachelor's degree)
10. Petro and Oleo Chemistry (Diploma)
11. Survey and Mapping (Diploma)
- Faculty of Fishery and Marine Sciences
1. Aquaculture (Bachelor's degree)
2. Water resource management (Bachelor's degree)
3. Fishery agribusiness (Bachelor's degree)
- Faculty of Forestry
1. Forestry (Bachelor's degree, Master's degree and Doctoral degree)
- Faculty of Technology Information and Computer Sciences
1. Computer engineering (Bachelor's degree)
2. Computer Sciences (Bachelor's degree)
- Faculty of Law
1. Law (Bachelor's degree and master's degree)
- Faculty of Mathematics and Natural Sciences
1. Biology (Bachelor's degree)
2. Chemistry (Bachelor's degree and master's degree)
3. Physics (Bachelor's degree)
4. Geophysics (Bachelor's degree)
5. Statistics (Bachelor's degree)
6. Mathematics (Bachelor's degree)
- Faculty of Medicine
1. Medicine (Bachelor and professional degree)
2. Dentistry (Bachelor's degree and Professional degree)
3. Nursing (Diploma
- Faculty of Pharmacy
1. Pharmacy (Diploma, Bachelor's degree and Professional degree)
- Faculty of Public Health
1. Public Health (Bachelor's degree)

- Faculty of Social and Political Sciences
1. Communication (Bachelor's degree)
2. Political and Governmental Science (Bachelor's degree)
3. International Relations (Bachelor's degree)
4. Office administration (Diploma)
5. Psychology (Bachelor's degree)
6. Secretary (Diploma)
7. Sociatry (Bachelor's degree)
8. Public Administration (Bachelor's degree)
9. Tourism (Diploma)
10. Business Administration (Diploma and bachelor's degree)
- Faculty of Teaching and Education Sciences
1. Biology education (Bachelor's degree)
2. Chemistry education (Bachelor's degree)
3. Civics education (Bachelor's degree)
4. Computer education (Bachelor's degree)
5. Education counselling (Bachelor's degree)
6. Early childhood education (Bachelor's degree)
7. Economics education (Bachelor's degree)
8. Elementary education (Bachelor's degree)
9. English Education (Bachelor's degree)
10. Indonesian and regional language-literature (Bachelor's degree)
11. Mathematics education (Bachelor's degree)
12. Outschooling education (Bachelor's degree)
13. Physical and health education (Bachelor's degree)
14. Physics education (Bachelor's degree)
15. Teaching (Professional degree)
- Postgraduate Program
1. Environmental sciences (Master's degree)

== Campuses ==
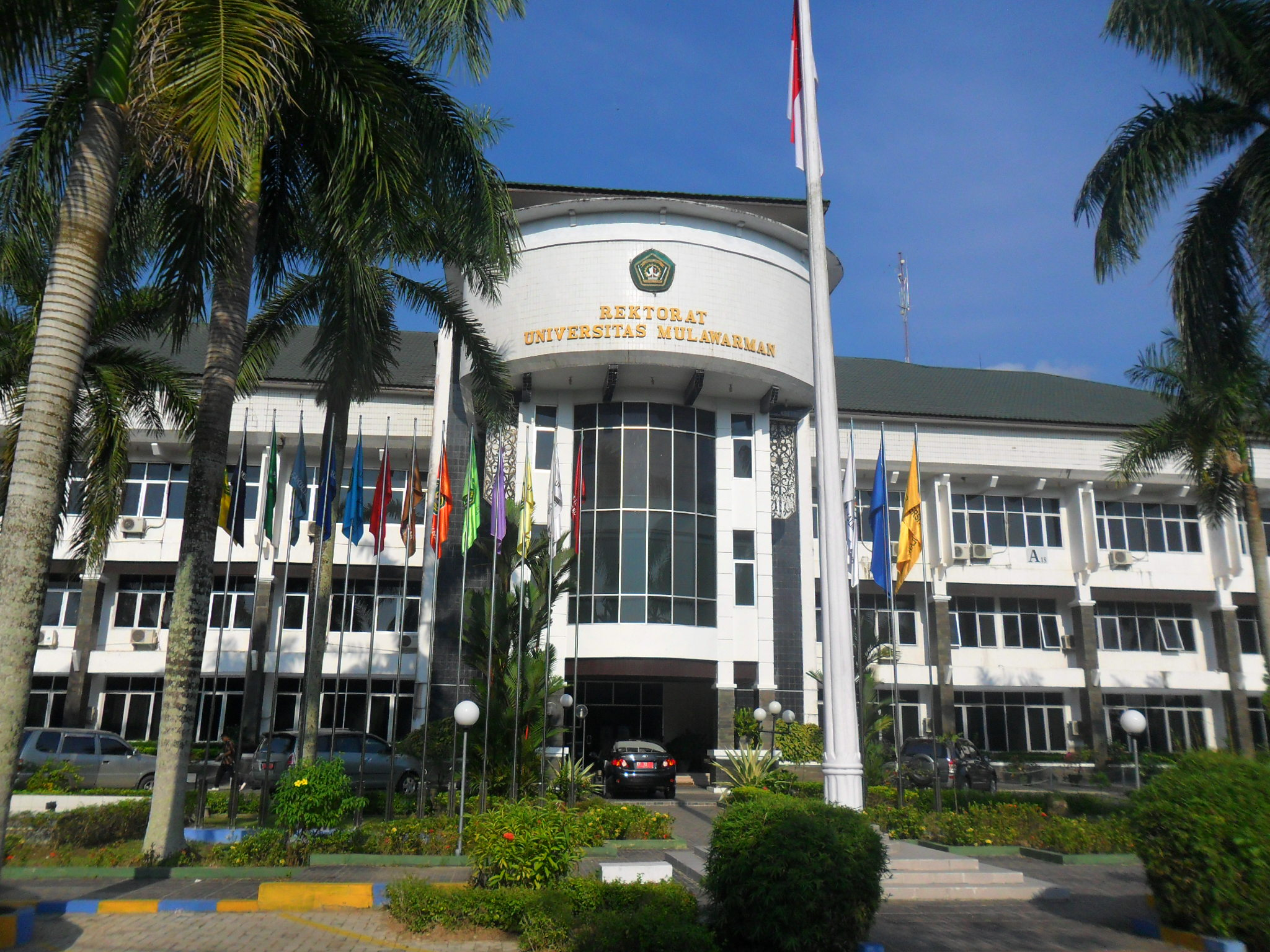
Rectorate building of Mulawarman University at Gunung Kelua campus.

There are four campuses of Universitas Mulawarman:

- Gunung Kelua campus is the main campus, located in Gunung Kelua area, Samarinda, where most of the faculties, administrative office and student services can be found. Its main entrance is on Muhammad Yamin road. Public transport is the Angkutan Kota route C.
- Pahlawan campus is on Harmonika street (crossing the Pahlawan road), Samarinda. It is the location for Education for Language Sciences Studies of the Faculty of Teaching and Education Sciences. Public transport is Angkutan Kota route A, B and C.
- Banggeris campus is on Banggeris street, Samarinda, near the Islamic Center. The Education for Social Sciences Studies of the Faculty of Teaching and Education Sciences is here. Public transport is Angkutan Kota route A.
- Flores campus is on Flores street, Samarinda, near the city center. It is the location of the Faculty of Cultural Sciences, the Economics Studies postgraduate programs and the Language Center. It was the first main campus of Universitas Mulawarman. Public transport is Angkutan Kota route B.

Some faculties also has other teaching locations:

- The program of Integrated Governmental Sciences of the Faculty of Social and Political Sciences in Kalian street.
- Abdul Wahab Sjahranie General Hospital as the teaching hospital for the Faculty of Medicine.
- Laboratories of the Faculty of Forestry in Samboja, Bukit Soeharto and Tanahmerah.
- Laboratories of the Faculty of Agriculture in Telukdalam and Berambah.

== Facilities and services ==
Most facilities and services available to support the student are located in the main campus of Gunung Kelua, such as auditorium, banks and ATMs (Bank Negara Indonesia, Bank Muamalat, Bank Tabungan Negara, Bank Kaltim and Bank Mandiri), clinic of the Faculty of Medicine, guest house, Language Center (in Flores campus), library, mosque of Al-Fatihah, radio Metro Mulawarman, security, sport facilities: Kurusetra football field, September 27 Sport Hall, including badminton, basketball, tennis, and volleyball courts, and also wall climbs and jogging track, student accommodation, Student Activity Center and Student Co-op.

=== Technical Operational Units ===
Several services are managed under technical operational units: Academics Development Center (for teaching capacity improvement), Bukit Soeharto Research and Education Forest in Kutai Kartanegara and Penajam North Paser, Business Management Development, Center for Social Forestry, Computer Center, Distance Learning Unit, Fundamental Science Laboratory, Language Center (in Flores campus, providing courses of foreign language, especially English), Library of Universitas Mulawarman (with more than 90,000 titles), Personality Development Unit, Quality Assurance, and Universitas Mulawarman Samarinda Botanical Garden in North Samarinda.

== Student activities ==
The highest organizational body for students is the Students Executive Board. The organization is led by an elected president, who runs the office with help from a vice president, a Secretary General, a Treasurer and several Ministries. The Board is responsible to the Students Representative Council, the highest student legislative organization in the university. There are several students activity unit, such as: (Music) Band, Football, IMAPA (environmental preservation, adventuring, forest mountaineering, rock climbing, and rafting), Journalism, KBMK (Christian religious activities) KSR (volunteering, in cooperation with the Indonesian Red Cross), PUSDIMA (Islamic dakwah center), PSM (university student choir), Pramuka (scouting), Softball, Taekwondo and Yupa Theater. Many student activities are maintained in the Student Activity Center.

== Institutes ==
=== Research Institute ===
The Research Institute of Universitas Mulawarman is the backbone of the science and technology development in Kalimantan. The institute is an independent unit which coordinates, evaluates, monitors, and assesses the research activities which are carried out by the university research centers and staff.

The research centers in the institute are:

- Environmental research center
- Gender research center
- Humanity studies research center
- Natural resources research center
- Regional development research center
- Tropical rainforest research center

=== Community Service Institute ===
The Community Service Institute is a place to implement science and technological invention from research into the community. The development centers in the institute are:

- Assessment, action and development of regional potential center
- Community education center
- Community empowerment and internship center
- Small and medium scale trade and entrepreneurship development center
- Technology and research implementation center

== Admissions ==
There are several ways of admission:

- SNMPTN (National Selection for University Entrance), through Selected Invitation path or National Examination path for undergraduate program
- SMMPTN (Independent Selection for University Entrance), through university Independent Examination for undergraduate program
- Independent selection for postgraduate program

== Scholarships ==
Scholarships for students include:

- Award from the Ministry of Education and Culture
  - Bidik Misi Award, given for selected first-year students, in coordination with the selection for university entrance.
  - BBM Award and PPA Award, given for selected second-year students.
  - Darmasiswa Scholarship Program for international students who want to study Indonesian language and culture.
- Kaltim Cemerlang Award from the Government of East Kalimantan.
- Other scholarships given from many regional governments, corporates and foundations.

== Awards ==
Webometrics Ranking of World Universities in 2011 placed Universitas Mulawarman 8571st in the world and 86th in Indonesia.

"4International Colleges and Universities" in 2012 ranked Universitas Mulawarman 5000th in the world and 50th in Indonesia.
