= Onward Indonesia Cabinet =

2019–2024 Indonesian government

Onward Indonesia Cabinet Kabinet Indonesia Maju
- 41st Cabinet of Indonesia
- 2019–2024
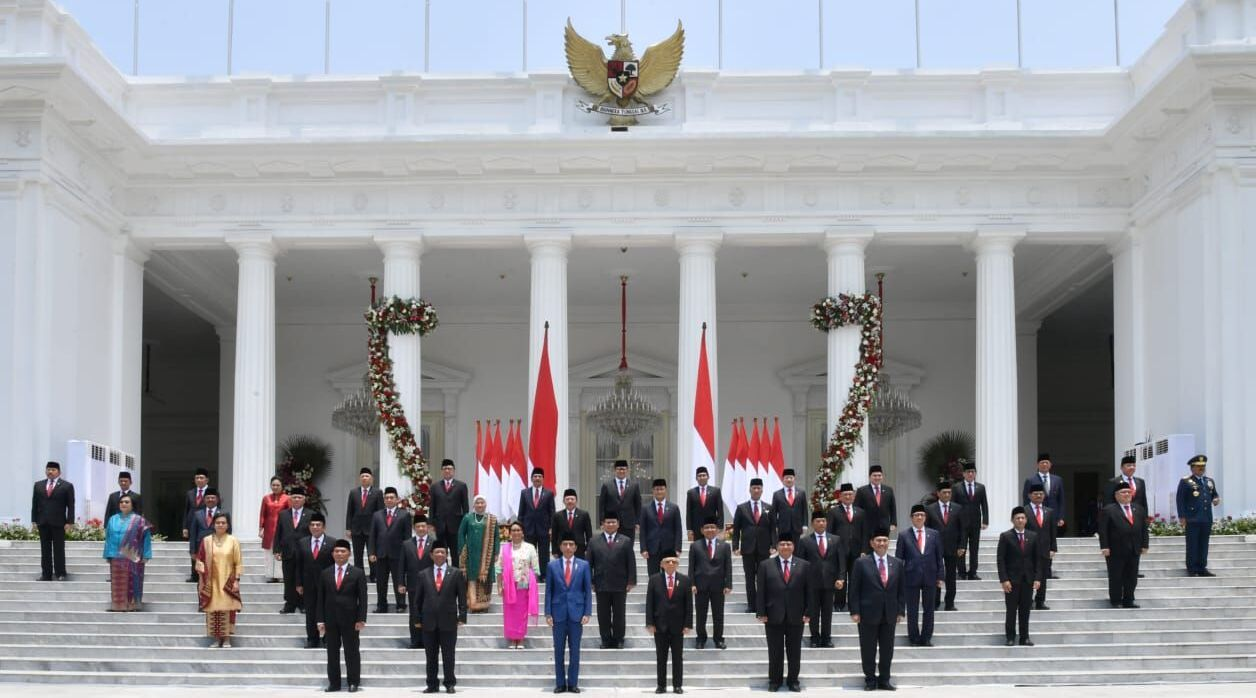
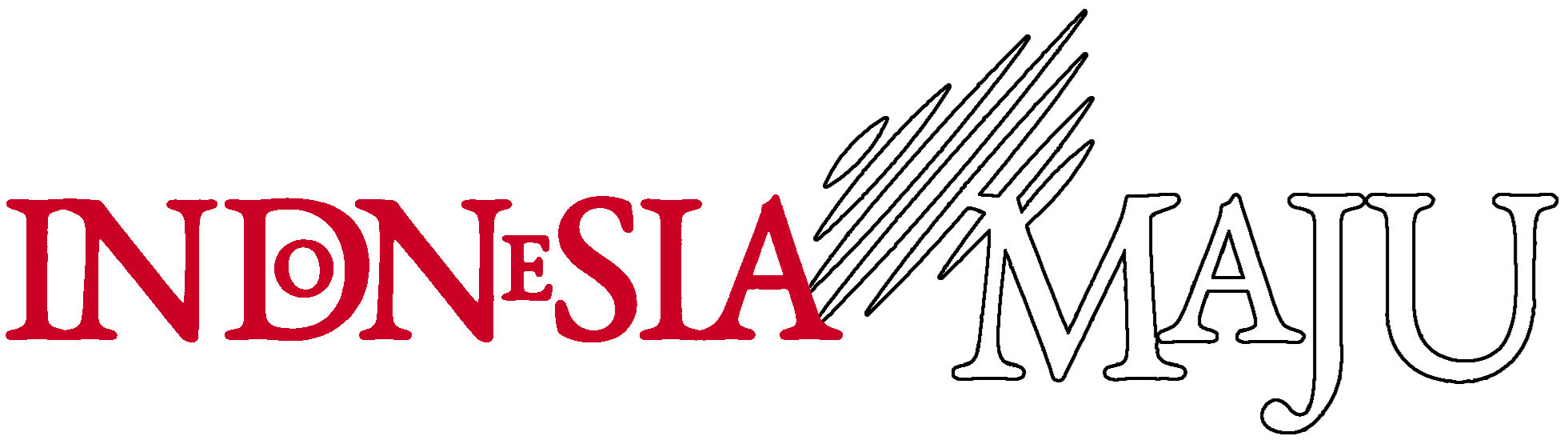
- Date formed: 23 October 2019
- Date dissolved: 20 October 2024

People and organisations
- Head of government: Joko Widodo
- No. of ministers: 34 ministers; 19 deputy ministers
- Member parties: Onward Indonesia Coalition: Indonesian Democratic Party of Struggle; Gerindra Party; NasDem Party; Golkar Party; National Awakening Party; National Mandate Party; United Development Party; Indonesian Solidarity Party; Perindo Party; Crescent Star Party; Democratic Party (2024); Independent
- Status in legislature: Supermajority coalition 525 / 575
- Opposition parties: Prosperous Justice Party; Democratic Party (2019–2024)

History
- Election: 2019 Indonesian presidential election
- Predecessor: Working Cabinet
- Successor: Red and White Cabinet

The Onward Indonesia Cabinet (Indonesian: Kabinet Indonesia Maju) was sworn in on 23 October 2019 by President Joko Widodo. The president reshuffled this cabinet 13 times. The last reshuffle occurred on 11 September 2024.

== Lineup ==
=== Heads of the cabinet ===
President	Vice President
Joko Widodo	Ma'ruf Amin

=== Coordinating ministers ===
Portfolio	Minister	Took office	Left office	Party
Coordinating Minister for Political, Legal, and Security Affairs	Mahfud MD	23 October 2019	2 February 2024	Independent
Coordinating Minister for Political, Legal, and Security Affairs	Tito Karnavian (acting)	2 February 2024	21 February 2024	Independent
Coordinating Minister for Political, Legal, and Security Affairs	Hadi Tjahjanto	21 February 2024	20 October 2024	Independent
Coordinating Minister for Economic Affairs	Airlangga Hartarto	23 October 2019	20 October 2024	Golkar
Coordinating Minister for Maritime and Investment Affairs	Luhut Binsar Pandjaitan	23 October 2019	20 October 2024	Golkar
Coordinating Minister for Human Development and Cultural Affairs	Muhadjir Effendy	23 October 2019	20 October 2024	Independent

=== Ministers ===
Portfolio	Minister	Took office	Left office	Party
Minister of State Secretariat	Pratikno	23 October 2019	20 October 2024	Independent
Minister of Home Affairs	Tito Karnavian	23 October 2019	20 October 2024	Independent
Minister of Foreign Affairs	Retno Marsudi	23 October 2019	20 October 2024	Independent
Minister of Defense	Prabowo Subianto	23 October 2019	20 October 2024	Gerindra
Minister of Law and Human Rights	Yasonna Laoly	23 October 2019	19 August 2024	PDI-P
Minister of Law and Human Rights	Supratman Andi Agtas	19 August 2024	20 October 2024	Gerindra
Minister of Finance	Sri Mulyani	23 October 2019	20 October 2024	Independent
Minister of Energy and Mineral Resources	Arifin Tasrif	23 October 2019	19 August 2024	Independent
Minister of Energy and Mineral Resources	Bahlil Lahadalia	19 August 2024	20 October 2024	Golkar
Minister of Industry	Agus Gumiwang Kartasasmita	23 October 2019	20 October 2024	Golkar
Minister of Trade	Agus Suparmanto	23 October 2019	23 December 2020	PKB
Minister of Trade	Muhammad Lutfi	23 December 2020	15 June 2022	Independent
Minister of Trade	Zulkifli Hasan	15 June 2022	20 October 2024	PAN
Minister of Agriculture	Syahrul Yasin Limpo	23 October 2019	6 October 2023	NasDem
Minister of Agriculture	Arief Prasetyo Adi (acting)	6 October 2023	25 October 2023	Independent
Minister of Agriculture	Amran Sulaiman	25 October 2023	20 October 2024	Independent
Minister of Environment and Forestry	Siti Nurbaya Bakar	23 October 2019	20 October 2024	NasDem
Minister of Transportation	Budi Karya Sumadi	23 October 2019	20 October 2024	Independent
Minister of Marine Affairs and Fisheries	Edhy Prabowo	23 October 2019	25 November 2020	Gerindra
Minister of Marine Affairs and Fisheries	Luhut Binsar Pandjaitan (interim)	25 November 2020	2 December 2020	Golkar
Minister of Marine Affairs and Fisheries	Syahrul Yasin Limpo (interim)	2 December 2020	23 December 2020	NasDem
Minister of Marine Affairs and Fisheries	Sakti Wahyu Trenggono	23 December 2020	20 October 2024	Independent
Minister of Manpower	Ida Fauziyah	23 October 2019	1 October 2024	PKB
Minister of Manpower	Airlangga Hartarto (acting)	1 October 2024	20 October 2024	Golkar
Minister of Public Works and Housing	Basuki Hadimuljono	23 October 2019	20 October 2024	Independent
Minister of Health	Terawan Agus Putranto	23 October 2019	23 December 2020	Independent
Minister of Health	Budi Gunadi Sadikin	23 December 2020	20 October 2024	Independent
Minister of Education, Culture, Research, and Technology (Previously named the Minister of Education and Culture)	Nadiem Makarim	23 October 2019	20 October 2024	Independent
Minister of Agrarian Affairs and Spatial Planning (Head of National Land Agency)	Sofyan Djalil	23 October 2019	15 June 2022	Independent
Minister of Agrarian Affairs and Spatial Planning (Head of National Land Agency)	Hadi Tjahjanto	15 June 2022	21 February 2024	Independent
Minister of Agrarian Affairs and Spatial Planning (Head of National Land Agency)	Agus Harimurti Yudhoyono	21 February 2024	20 October 2024	Demokrat
Minister of Social Affairs	Juliari Batubara	23 October 2019	6 December 2020	PDI-P
Minister of Social Affairs	Muhadjir Effendy (acting)	6 December 2020	23 December 2020	Independent
Minister of Social Affairs	Tri Rismaharini	23 December 2020	6 September 2024	PDI-P
Minister of Social Affairs	Muhadjir Effendy (acting)	6 September 2024	11 September 2024	Independent
Minister of Social Affairs	Saifullah Yusuf	11 September 2024	20 October 2024	PKB
Minister of Religious Affairs	Fachrul Razi	23 October 2019	23 December 2020	Independent
Minister of Religious Affairs	Yaqut Cholil Qoumas	23 December 2020	20 October 2024	PKB
Minister of Communications and Informatics	Johnny G. Plate	23 October 2019	19 May 2023	NasDem
Minister of Communications and Informatics	Mahfud MD (acting)	19 May 2023	17 July 2023	Independent
Minister of Communications and Informatics	Budi Arie Setiadi	17 July 2023	20 October 2024	Independent
Minister of Research and Technology (Head of National Research and Innovation Agency) (merged to Ministry of Education and Culture)	Bambang Brodjonegoro	23 October 2019	28 April 2021	Independent
Minister of Cooperatives and Small & Medium Enterprises	Teten Masduki	23 October 2019	20 October 2024	PDI-P
Minister of Women Empowerment and Child Protection	I Gusti Ayu Bintang Darmawati	23 October 2019	20 October 2024	PDI-P
Minister of State Apparatus Utilization and Bureaucratic Reform	Tjahjo Kumolo	23 October 2019	20 June 2022	PDI-P
Minister of State Apparatus Utilization and Bureaucratic Reform	Mahfud MD (interim)	20 June 2022	4 July 2022	Independent
Minister of State Apparatus Utilization and Bureaucratic Reform	Tito Karnavian (interim)	4 July 2022	16 July 2022	Independent
Minister of State Apparatus Utilization and Bureaucratic Reform	Mahfud MD (acting)	16 July 2022	7 September 2022	Independent
Minister of State Apparatus Utilization and Bureaucratic Reform	Abdullah Azwar Anas	7 September 2022	20 October 2024	PDI-P
Minister of Villages, Development of Disadvantaged Regions, and Transmigration	Abdul Halim Iskandar	23 October 2019	1 October 2024	PKB
Minister of Villages, Development of Disadvantaged Regions, and Transmigration	Muhadjir Effendy (acting)	1 October 2024	20 October 2024	Independent
Minister of National Development Planning (Head of National Development Planning Agency)	Suharso Monoarfa	23 October 2019	20 October 2024	PPP
Minister of State-Owned Enterprises	Erick Thohir	23 October 2019	20 October 2024	Independent
Minister of Tourism and Creative Economy (Head of Tourism and Creative Economy Agency)	Wishnutama	23 October 2019	23 December 2020	Independent
Minister of Tourism and Creative Economy (Head of Tourism and Creative Economy Agency)	Sandiaga Uno	23 December 2020	20 October 2024	PPP
Minister of Youth and Sports	Zainudin Amali	23 October 2019	13 March 2023	Golkar
Minister of Youth and Sports	Muhadjir Effendy (interim)	13 March 2023	3 April 2023	Independent
Minister of Youth and Sports	Dito Ariotedjo	3 April 2023	20 October 2024	Golkar
Minister of Investment (Head of Investment Coordinating Board)	Bahlil Lahadalia	28 April 2021	19 August 2024	Golkar
Minister of Investment (Head of Investment Coordinating Board)	Rosan Roeslani	19 August 2024	20 October 2024	Independent

=== Deputy ministers ===
Portfolio	Minister	Took office	Left office	Party
Deputy Minister of Communications and Informatics	Nezar Patria	17 July 2023	20 October 2024	Independent
Deputy Minister of Communications and Informatics	Angga Raka Prabowo	19 August 2024	20 October 2024	Gerindra
Deputy Minister of Foreign Affairs	Mahendra Siregar	25 October 2019	19 July 2022	Independent
Deputy Minister of Foreign Affairs	Vacant	20 July 2022	17 July 2023	Vacant
Deputy Minister of Foreign Affairs	Pahala Mansury	17 July 2023	20 October 2024	Independent
Deputy Minister of Defense	Sakti Wahyu Trenggono	25 October 2019	23 December 2020	Independent
Deputy Minister of Defense	Muhammad Herindra	23 December 2020	20 October 2024	Independent
Deputy Minister of Religious Affairs	Zainut Tauhid	25 October 2019	17 July 2023	PPP
Deputy Minister of Religious Affairs	Saiful Rahmat Dasuki	17 July 2023	20 October 2024	PPP
Deputy Minister of Finance	Suahasil Nazara	25 October 2019	20 October 2024	Independent
Deputy Minister of Finance	Thomas Djiwandono	18 July 2024	20 October 2024	Gerindra
Deputy Minister of Trade	Jerry Sambuaga	25 October 2019	20 October 2024	Golkar
Deputy Minister of Public Works and Housing	John Wempi Wetipo	25 October 2019	15 June 2022	PDI-P
Deputy Minister of Home Affairs	John Wempi Wetipo	15 June 2022	27 September 2024	PDI-P
Deputy Minister of Environment and Forestry	Alue Dohong	25 October 2019	20 October 2024	Independent
Deputy Minister of Villages, Development of Disadvantaged Regions, and Transmigration	Budi Arie Setiadi	25 October 2019	17 July 2023	Independent
Deputy Minister of Villages, Development of Disadvantaged Regions, and Transmigration	Paiman Raharjo	17 July 2023	20 October 2024	Independent
Deputy Minister of Agrarian Affairs and Spatial Planning (Deputy Head of National Land Agency)	Surya Tjandra	25 October 2019	15 June 2022	PSI
Deputy Minister of Agrarian Affairs and Spatial Planning (Deputy Head of National Land Agency)	Raja Juli Antoni	15 June 2022	20 October 2024	PSI
Deputy Minister of State-Owned Enterprises	Budi Gunadi Sadikin	25 October 2019	23 December 2020	Independent
Deputy Minister of State-Owned Enterprises	Pahala Mansury	23 December 2020	17 July 2023	Independent
Deputy Minister of State-Owned Enterprises	Kartika Wirjoatmodjo	25 October 2019	20 October 2024	Independent
Deputy Minister of State-Owned Enterprises	Rosan Roeslani	17 July 2023	25 October 2023	Independent
Deputy Minister of Tourism and Creative Economy (Deputy Head of Tourism and Creative Economy Agency)	Angela Tanoesoedibjo	25 October 2019	20 October 2024	Perindo
Deputy Minister of Health	Dante Saksono Harbuwono	23 December 2020	20 October 2024	Independent
Deputy Minister of Law and Human Rights	Eddy Hiariej	23 December 2020	7 December 2023	Independent
Deputy Minister of Agriculture	Harvick Hasnul Qolbi	23 December 2020	18 July 2024	Independent
Deputy Minister of Agriculture	Sudaryono	18 July 2024	20 October 2024	Gerindra
Deputy Minister of Manpower	Afriansyah Noor	15 June 2022	20 October 2024	PBB
Deputy Minister of Investment	Yuliot Tanjung	18 July 2024	20 October 2024	Independent

=== Other positions ===
Portfolio	Minister	Took office	Left office	Party
Cabinet Secretary	Pramono Anung	23 October 2019	22 September 2024	PDI-P
Cabinet Secretary	Pratikno (acting)	22 September 2024	20 October 2024	Independent
Chief of Presidential Staff	Moeldoko	23 October 2019	20 October 2024	Independent
Presidential Spokesperson	Fadjroel Rachman	23 October 2019	26 October 2021	Independent
Head of Presidential Communication Office	Hasan Nasbi	19 August 2024	Incumbent	Independent
Head of Nusantara Capital City Authority	Bambang Susantono	10 March 2022	3 June 2024	Independent
Head of Nusantara Capital City Authority	Basuki Hadimuljono (acting)	3 June 2024	Incumbent	Independent

== Reshuffles ==
=== First reshuffle ===
On 22 December 2020, the president replaced six ministers. The most notable addition to the cabinet was businessman Sandiaga Uno. His admission into the cabinet following his former running mate in the 2019 presidential election Prabowo Subianto, made it the first time in Indonesia's history that all former contestants of a single presidential election were in the same cabinet. The new ministers were sworn in on 23 December 2020. Five deputy ministers were also appointed, three of them to new deputy minister positions.

=== Second reshuffle ===
On 30 March 2021, the president proposed to the People's Representative Council changes to the structure of his cabinet, seeking to merge the Ministry of Research and Technology and the Ministry of Education and Culture into a single ministry named the Ministry of Education, Culture, Research, and Technology. He also proposed a new ministry, the Ministry of Investment to be spun off from the Coordinating Ministry for Maritime and Investments Affairs, but remaining under the latter's coordination, while the National Research and Innovation Agency would be separated as a new non-ministerial agency. On 9 April 2021, the People's Representative Council approved the changes. On 13 April 2021, presidential spokesman Ali Mochtar Ngabalin said the second reshuffle would take place in the second week of April. However, the reshuffle was announced on 28 April 2021. Unusually, it not only reshuffled some ministers, but also disbanded a ministerial institution during the mid-term.

=== Third reshuffle ===
Since the National Mandate Party joined the government coalition on 25 August 2021, there has been controversy over a potential third cabinet reshuffle to allow the party to join the cabinet. On 23 September 2021, the party stated to be ready to take place and contributing together with the government in the cabinet. It was said that the third reshuffle will take place between the end of September 2021 and early October 2021; however, the deadline passed and no reshuffle took place. On 25 October 2021, President Spokesperson Fadjroel Rachman was appointed as Indonesian Ambassador to Kazakhstan, leaving his post vacant. The position was then filled by Joko Widodo himself.

On 17 November 2021, the question of the third reshuffle arose again. However, sources from unnamed president officials revealed that the future reshuffle was not because of issues regarding minister performance, but due to replacement after several ministers contracted COVID-19 and became physically disabled, severely limiting their ability to serve in their positions. Since the end of 2020, Joko Widodo opened many deputy minister posts in many ministries, however, the positions are yet to be filled. This includes the Deputy Minister post at Ministry of Energy and Mineral Resources, adding to the long list of vacant deputy minister posts created in his presidency. On 18 November 2021, the People's Consultative Assembly formally requested Joko Widodo to conduct a reshuffle as fast as possible due to the large number of vacant deputy minister positions.

On 8 March 2022, a question of the third reshuffle arose again. This time there was a rumor that National Mandate Party will gain a position in the cabinet and the reshuffle will be done in late March 2022. The rumor was quickly dispelled by Zulkifli Hasan, the party leader himself. In fact, the third reshuffle realized on 10 March 2022. In the third reshuffle, Bambang Susantono was inaugurated as the Head of Nusantara Capital City Authority, and Dhony Rahajoe was inaugurated as the Deputy Head of Nusantara Capital City Authority.

=== Fourth reshuffle ===
On 15 June 2022, the fourth reshuffle occurred. In this reshuffle, 2 ministers reshuffled, and 3 deputy ministers were set up. A Deputy minister post, Deputy Minister of Public Works and Housing is vacated. The reshuffle marked as the first time an Indonesian cabinet is reshuffled four times since the era of the National Unity Cabinet under Wahid's administration.

=== Fifth reshuffle ===
On 24 June 2022, Tjahjo Kumolo reported contracted unknown illness and replaced by Mahfud MD as ad interim Minister of Administrative and Bureaucratic Reform. He died after being hospitalized at Abdi Waluyo Hospital in Jakarta on 1 July 2022. Potential fifth reshuffle will be announced later after mourning period. Fifth reshuffle likely done after 15 July 2022, coincidentally at the day with the end of mourning period and Tito Karnavian limit of ad interim. On 15 July, Mahfud MD appointed as acting Minister of Administrative and Bureaucratic Reform. On 7 September 2022, Abdullah Azwar Anas become Minister of Administrative and Bureaucratic Reform in the fifth reshuffle.

=== Sixth reshuffle ===
Nasdem Party declared Joko Widodo's political rival, Anies Baswedan, as a presidential candidate on October 3, 2022. As the result, pro-Joko Widodo side voiced and promoted the reshuffle and expelled Nasdem Party from the cabinet. On 23 December 2022, Joko Widodo announced he will reshuffle his cabinet, although not giving much detail which minister that will be reshuffled. The Executive Office of the President of the Republic of Indonesia confirmed that the reshuffle will be realized in January 2023, but it never happened until the time past.

Zainuddin Amali expressed his intention to step down his position as Minister of Youth and Sport Affairs after being elected as Indonesian Football Association vice president. His intention finally realized and Joko Widodo accepted his resignation on 13 March 2023. On 16 March 2023, Zainuddin Amali stepped down from the minister position and replaced with Muhadjir Effendy as acting minister. The sixth reshuffle took place 3 April 2023. In this occasion, Dito Ariotedjo of Golkar Party, appointed as replacement of Zainuddin Amali. He was the first Indonesian millennial appointed as the minister.

=== Seventh reshuffle ===
On 17 May 2023, Minister of Communication and Information Technology Johnny G. Plate arrested due to corruption, leaving potential seventh reshuffle opened. On 19 May 2023, Mahfud MD appointed as acting minister. On 17 July 2023, Joko Widodo reshuffled his cabinet. In this reshuffle, he placed Budi Arie Setiadi placed as the new minister of Communication and Information Technology. He also placed other deputy ministers as well.

=== Eighth reshuffle ===
On 3 August 2023, Amarulla Octavian, appointed as the Deputy Chairman of National Research and Innovation Agency.

=== Ninth reshuffle ===
Potential ninth reshuffle currently opened after several ministers suspected to be involved in legal cases. In same time, on 2 October 2023, Susilo Bambang Yudhoyono met Joko Widodo, further opening speculation of incoming reshuffle.

Nasdem Party confirmed that Syahrul Yasin Limpo resigned as Minister of Agriculture on 5 October 2023 over corruption case. Istana Negara also confirmed the incoming reshuffle will be happened. On 6 October 2023, Arief Prasetyo Adi appointed as acting Minister of Agriculture. On 25 October 2023, Amran Sulaiman, Minister of Agriculture of Joko Widodo's previous administration recalled from his retirement and assumed the post again.

=== Tenth reshuffle ===
On 21 February 2024, Joko Widodo reshuffled his cabinet. In this occasion, Hadi Tjahjanto became Coordinating Minister of Political, Legal, and Security Affairs replacing Mahfud MD and Agus Harimurti Yudhoyono became Minister of Agrarian Affairs and Spatial Planning/Head of National Land Agency replacing Hadi Tjahjanto.

Joko Widodo said that he might reshuffle his cabinet again despite only having 8 months remaining in his presidency.

The tenth reshuffle further cemented Joko Widodo's political position in his remaining period of his presidency, with almost all parties in legislature except Prosperous Justice Party currently on his administration side. With the joining of Democratic Party to Joko Widodo side, for the first time since its formation, Democratic Party joined a PDI-P backed government. The joining of Democratic Party also showed Joko Widodo's separation from PDI-P's power and influence.

=== Eleventh reshuffle ===
Eleventh reshuffle happened on 18 July 2024. In this reshuffle, Deputy Ministers for Agriculture, Investment, and Finance were appointed. In this reshuffle, Thomas Djiwandono become Second Deputy Minister of Finance. Sudaryono become Deputy Minister of Agriculture replacing Harvick Hasnul Qolbi. Yuliot Tanjung become Deputy Minister of Investment.

In unusual move, Thomas Djiwandono, Prabowo's nephew and member of Prabowo's Presidential Transitional Team made into Deputy Minister of Finance. This is for the first time in Indonesia history, a part of transitional team of future administration entering outgoing administration for transitional purpose.

=== Twelfth reshuffle ===
On 15 August 2024, Joko Widodo signed formation of two of Prabowo's future cabinet-level agencies, Presidential Communication Office (subsuming previous Presidential Spokesperson office and strategic communication section of Executive Office of the President of the Republic of Indonesia) and National Nutrition Agency to facilitate Prabowo's free lunch program.

On 19 August 2024, Joko Widodo reshuffled the cabinet. More members of Prabowo's Presidential Transitional Team joined his cabinet. In this reshuffle, the Minister of Law and Human Rights, Minister of Investment, and Minister of Energy and Mineral Resources were replaced. A Deputy Minister, Second Deputy Minister of Communication and Information Technology, added. Two chiefs of future cabinet-level agencies of Prabowo, the Presidential Communication Office and National Nutrition Agency, were also appointed, activating them even before his administration started.

=== Thirteenth reshuffle ===
On 11 September 2024, Saifullah Yusuf replaced Tri Rismaharini as Minister of Social Affairs.

== See also ==
- Politics of Indonesia
