= Nusantara =

Planned capital of Indonesia

Nusantara IKN
- Future national capital city of Indonesia
- Nusantara Capital City; Ibu Kota Nusantara
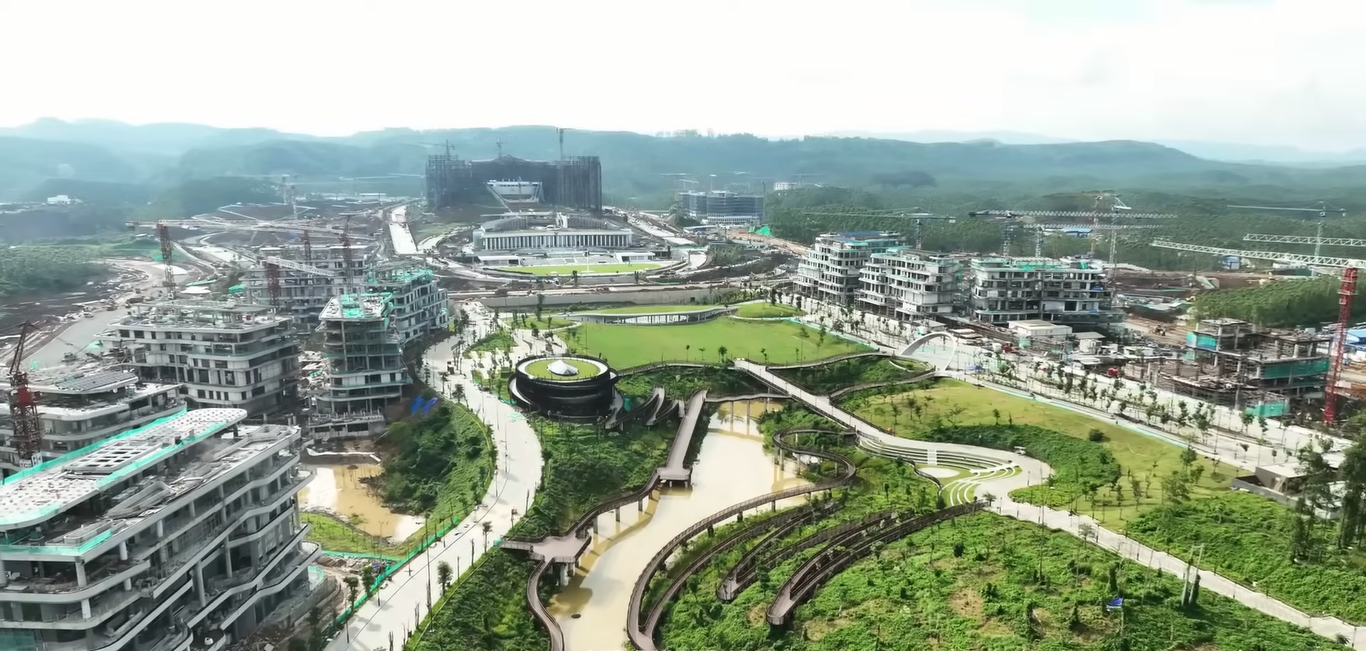
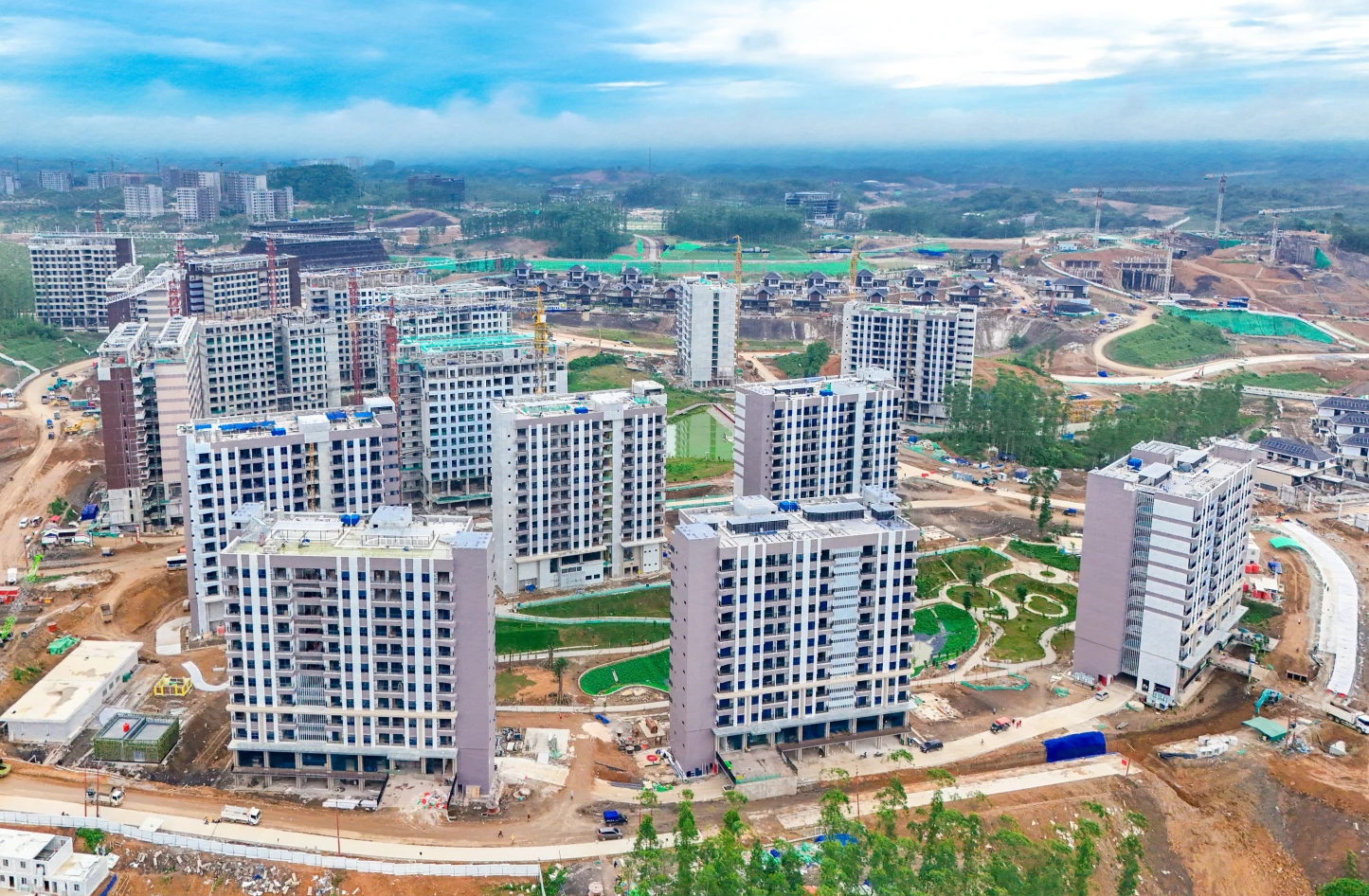
- Panoramic view of central government offices and presidential palace as of June 2024 Garuda Palace State Palace Residential towers

- Emblem
- Etymology: Old Javanese nūsāntara (lit. 'islands; archipelago'), the national endonym for Indonesia
- Motto: “Menuju Visi Indonesia 2045 — Kota dunia untuk semua” (in Indonesian) (lit. 'Towards the 2045 Golden Indonesia — a Global City for all')
- Location within Indonesia Location within Asia
- Coordinates: 0°58′23″S 116°42′31″E
- Country: Indonesia
- Province: East Kalimantan
- Established: 22 February 2022; 4 years ago

Government
  - Body: Capital City Authority
  - Head: Basuki Hadimuljono
  - Deputy Head: Vacant

Area
  - Total: 2,562 km^{2} (989 sq mi)
- Elevation: 33 m (108 ft)

Population (2025)
  - Total: 147,430
  - Density: 57.54/km^{2} (149.0/sq mi)
- Time zone: UTC+08:00 (WITA)
- Area code: (+62) 542
- Website: ikn.go.id

Nusantara, (Note: Indonesian pronunciation: [nusanˈtara]) officially Nusantara Capital City (Indonesian: Ibu Kota Nusantara, abbreviated IKN), is a city under construction that, upon completion, is planned to be the capital city of Indonesia. It occupies land in the East Kalimantan regencies of Penajam North Paser (where the Main Governmental Zone is being built) and Kutai Kartanegara on the east coast of the island of Borneo. Nusantara is planned to be its own national capital region (Indonesian: daerah khusus ibu kota negara) at the provincial level, replacing Jakarta to save the city from overpopulation and land sinking. Nusantara is adjacent to the port city of Balikpapan, which serves as the main gateway to the new capital.

After being postponed due to the COVID-19 pandemic in Indonesia, construction of the city began in 2022, starting with land clearing and creating access roads. The project is estimated to be worth Rp 523 trillion (US$35 billion) and will be built in five phases lasting until 2045, to coincide with the 100th anniversary of Indonesia. Phase 1, known as the "Main Governmental Area" zone, started in August 2022. Around 150,000 to 200,000 workers from around Indonesia participated in this project with an additional workforce around the Nusantara region to ensure the participation of local workers.

By the end of Joko Widodo's presidency, many buildings had been completed such as the State Palace, ministry offices, residential buildings, monuments and parks, as well as projects outside the government budget such as hotels, hospitals, and PSSI training centre. On 17 August 2024, Indonesia officially celebrated its Independence Day for the first time in Nusantara. Nusantara has attracted tourism, with daily visitors ranging between 3,000 and 5,000. The project continued during the presidency of Prabowo Subianto, who has allocated Rp 48.8 trillion (US$2.98 billion) for Phase 2 and has decided to include Nusantara as one of Indonesia's 2025–2029 National Strategic Projects.

The invested capital was provided by business entities, both domestic and foreign. As of September 2025, private investment outside the state budget (non-APBN) has reached Rp 65.3 trillion (US$4 billion) from 49 business actors (52 cooperation agreements).

== Etymology ==
“Nūsāntara” is an Old Javanese-origin term, meaning 'archipelago' or 'islands', referring to the geological nature of the Majapahit empire. The earliest evidence dates to the 1200s CE era of Singhasari (the predecessor state of Majapahit), its locus classicus being the Old Javanese inscription of Mula Malurung, found in East Java. The word itself is a portmanteau of the native Old Javanese ꦤꦸꦱ nūsa (lit. 'island') and Sanskrit loanword अन्तरा antarā, (lit. 'within; the interior part of a thing; place; property; peculiarity').

The term later entered several languages, especially those of peoples under Majapahit rule, including Kutainese, as recorded in the historical manuscript of Salasilah Kutai (lit. 'The genealogy of the Kutai kingdom'), which the area was referred to as Nusăntara (lit. 'land that is divided') before it was named Kutai in the 13th century CE according to the native Kutainese people.

It is chosen as the official name for the new capital city of Indonesia to embody the national geopolitical vision known as Wawasan Nusantara (lit. 'Nusantara Vision'; or 'Vision of the Indonesian archipelago'). It also reflects the country's status as an archipelagic state.

== History ==
=== Background ===
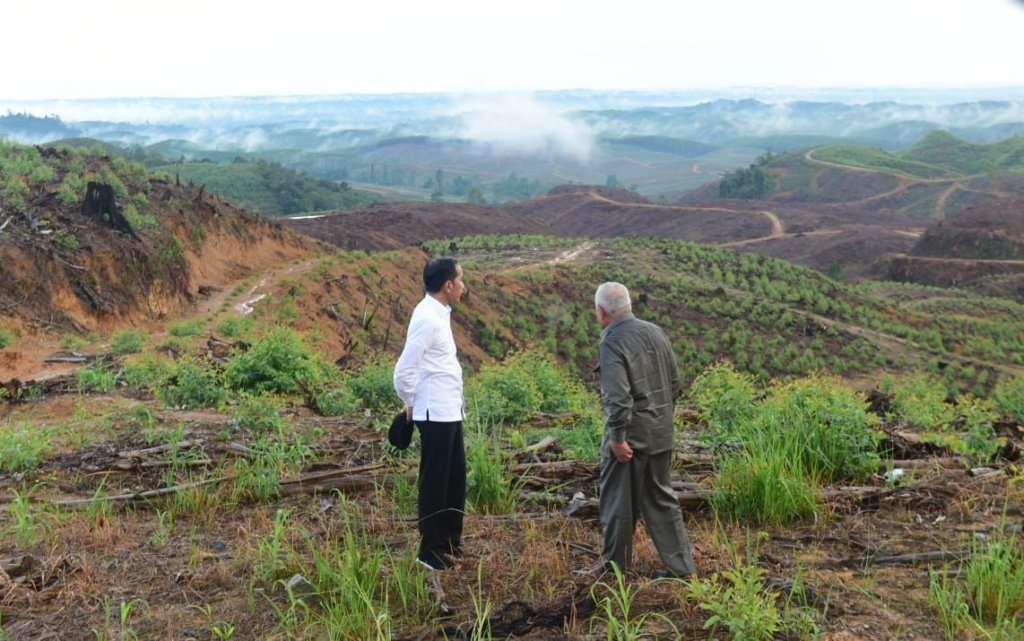
Then-president Joko Widodo alongside the then-governor of East Kalimantan Isran Noor visiting the location of Nusantara.

The relocation of Indonesia's capital from Jakarta has been proposed since the administration of the first president Sukarno, with Palangka Raya being planned as the future capital when he inaugurated the city in 1957. The relocation proposal kept being discussed for decades until the presidency of Susilo Bambang Yudhoyono who supported the idea to create a new political and administrative centre of Indonesia due to Jakarta's environmental and overpopulation problems.

In April 2017, the 7th president Joko Widodo ordered the Ministry of National Development Planning of Indonesia (Bappenas) to assess prospective alternative sites for new capital outside of Java. The plan was as part of a strategy to reduce developmental inequality between Java and other islands in the Indonesian archipelago and to reduce Jakarta's burden as Indonesia's primary hub.

In April 2019, a 10-year plan to transfer all government offices to a new capital city was announced. In August 2019, Widodo visited two alternative locations in Kalimantan, Bukit Soeharto in East Kalimantan, and the Triangle Area near Palangka Raya. The National Development Planning Ministry recommended the three provinces of South, Central, and East Kalimantan which Widodo visited, given that each met the requirements for a new capital—including being relatively free from earthquakes, tsunamis and volcanoes, as well as allowing for a maritime port.

=== Planning and design ===
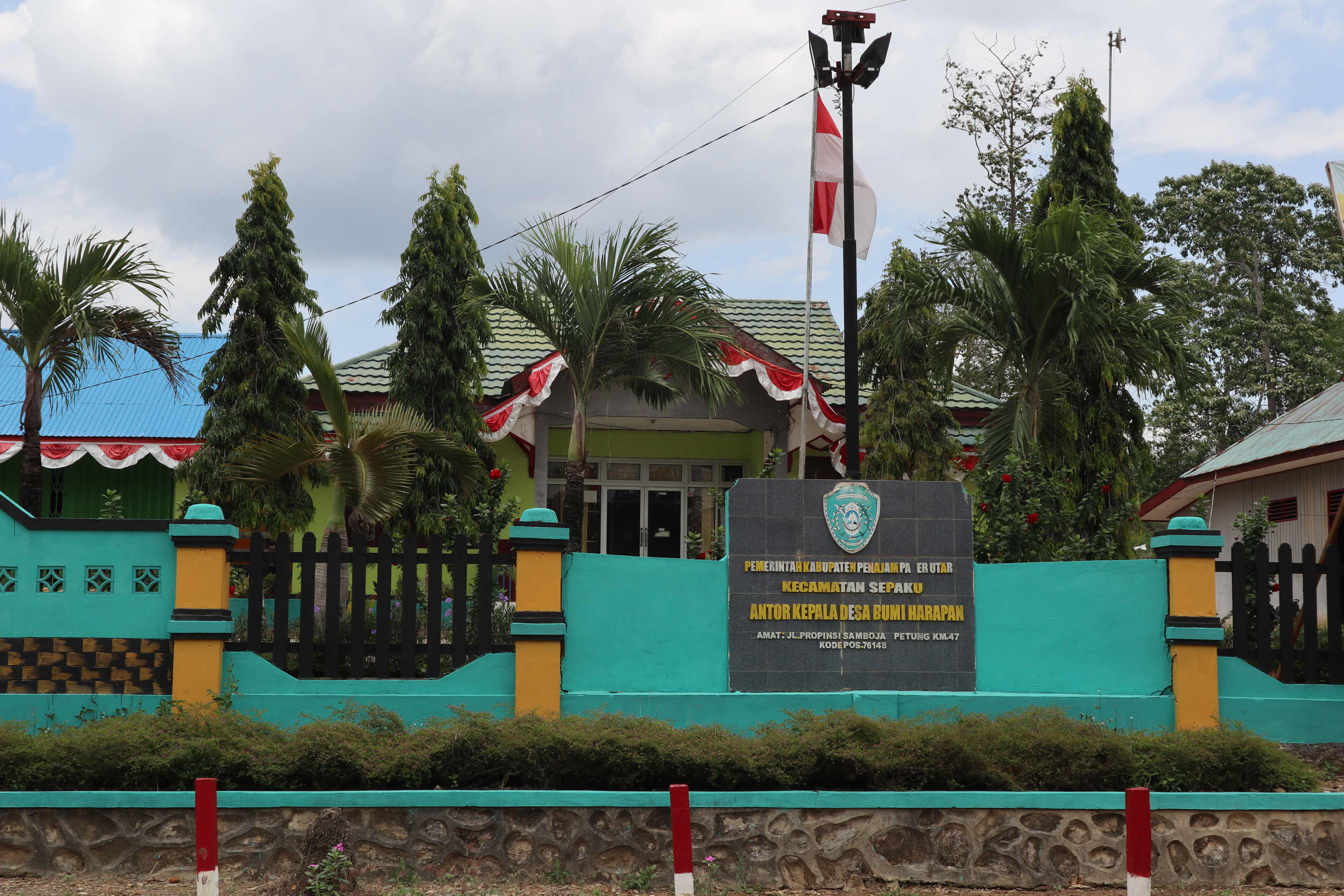
The village office of Bumi Harapan, the existing village in the core area of Nusantara.

On 23 August 2019, Widodo formally ratified the plan, Widodo made an announcement about moving the capital city to Kalimantan during his state address in parliament seven days earlier. In early September 2021, the bill for capital relocation was completed. On 29 September 2021, the Widodo administration submitted an omnibus bill for the capital relocation to the House of Representatives (the lower house of Indonesian legislature). Amongst many items prescribed in the bill, it contained the plan for the formation of a Capital City Authority (Otorita Ibu Kota Negara), a special agency responsible for the new capital and answering to the President. It would regulate how the Capital Authority will manage its funding, taxation, retribution, and assets.

The National Development Planning Ministry estimated the relocation cost to be Rp 466 trillion (US$32.7 billion) and that the government intended to cover 19% of the cost, the remainder coming mainly from public-private partnerships and direct investment by both state-owned enterprises and the private sector. At the same time, US$40 billion will be allocated to saving Jakarta from sinking in the next decade, which has also been widely reported as the fundamental underlying cause for the relocation of the capital. It was hoped that development of Nusantara would learn lessons from a similar relocation, when Brazil relocated its capital from Rio de Janeiro to Brasília in 1960.

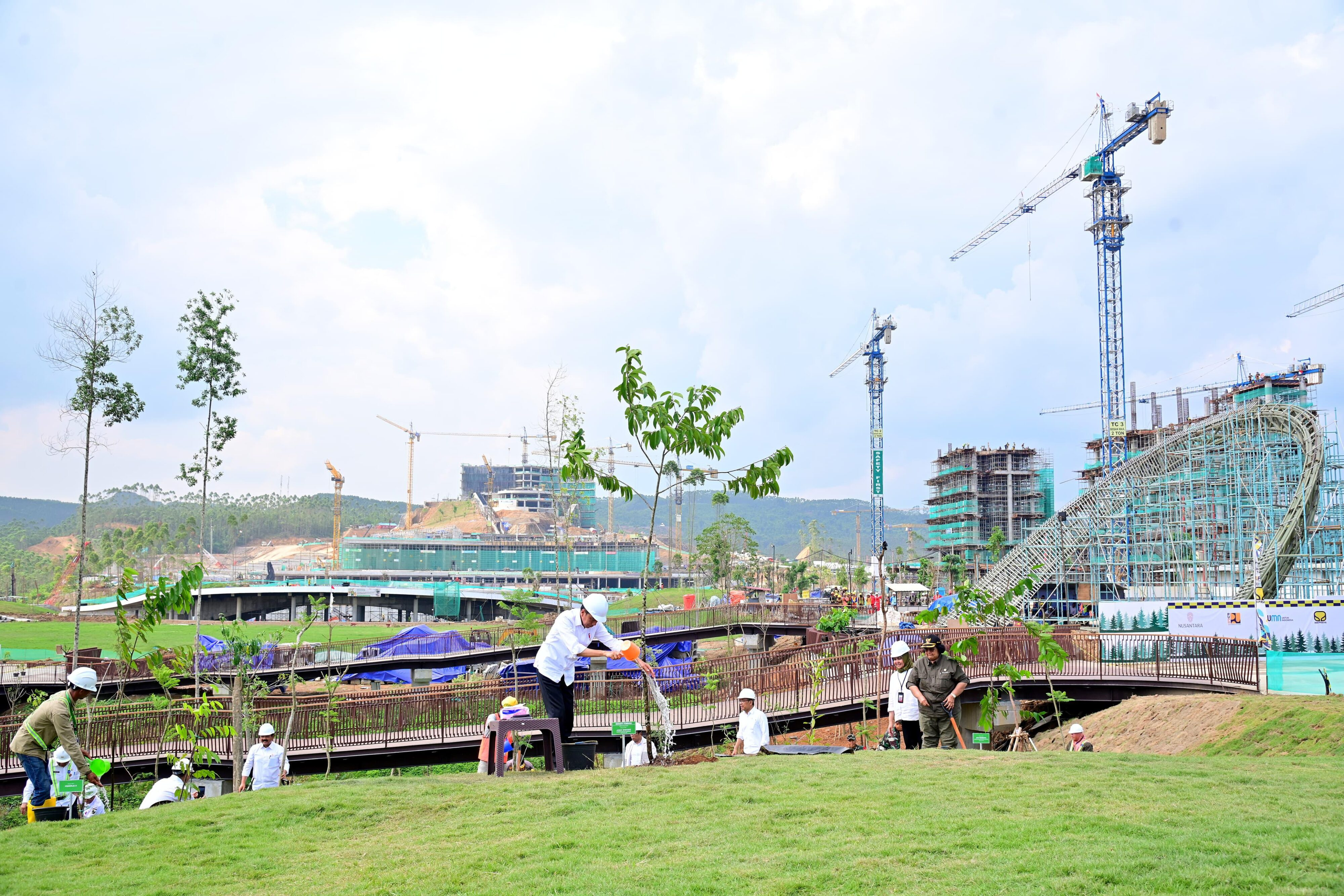
Trees being planted in Nusantara

The Ministry of Public Works and Public Housing organized a capital city design contest in late 2019. The winner, Nagara Rimba Nusa ('Forest Archipelagic Country') by Urban+ was officially announced on 23 December 2019. The government undertook to collaborate on the design of the winning team with that of the second- and third-placed teams, as well as international designers, to sharpen the final design process up to 2020. Designers from at least three countries, namely China, Japan, and the United States, had offered to be involved in the design. The name, which had been suggested about three months earlier, is aligned with the winner's main concept.

The city is designed for sustainability and protecting its surrounding Kalimantan forests, targeting 80% of mobility to be supported by public transport, cycling, or walking and drawing all of its energy from renewable sources and allocating 10% of its area to food production. However, critics have voiced many concerns about the impact of Nusantara on wildlife. On 17 January 2022, during a Special Committee Meeting, Minister of National Development Planning Suharso Monoarfa said the new nation's capital would be named Nusantara. In March 2022, the Ministry again organized a design contest for four structures, namely the vice-presidential palace, the legislatures' office complex, the judiciary's office complex, and a complex set for public worship next to Lake Pancasila.

=== Construction under Joko Widodo ===
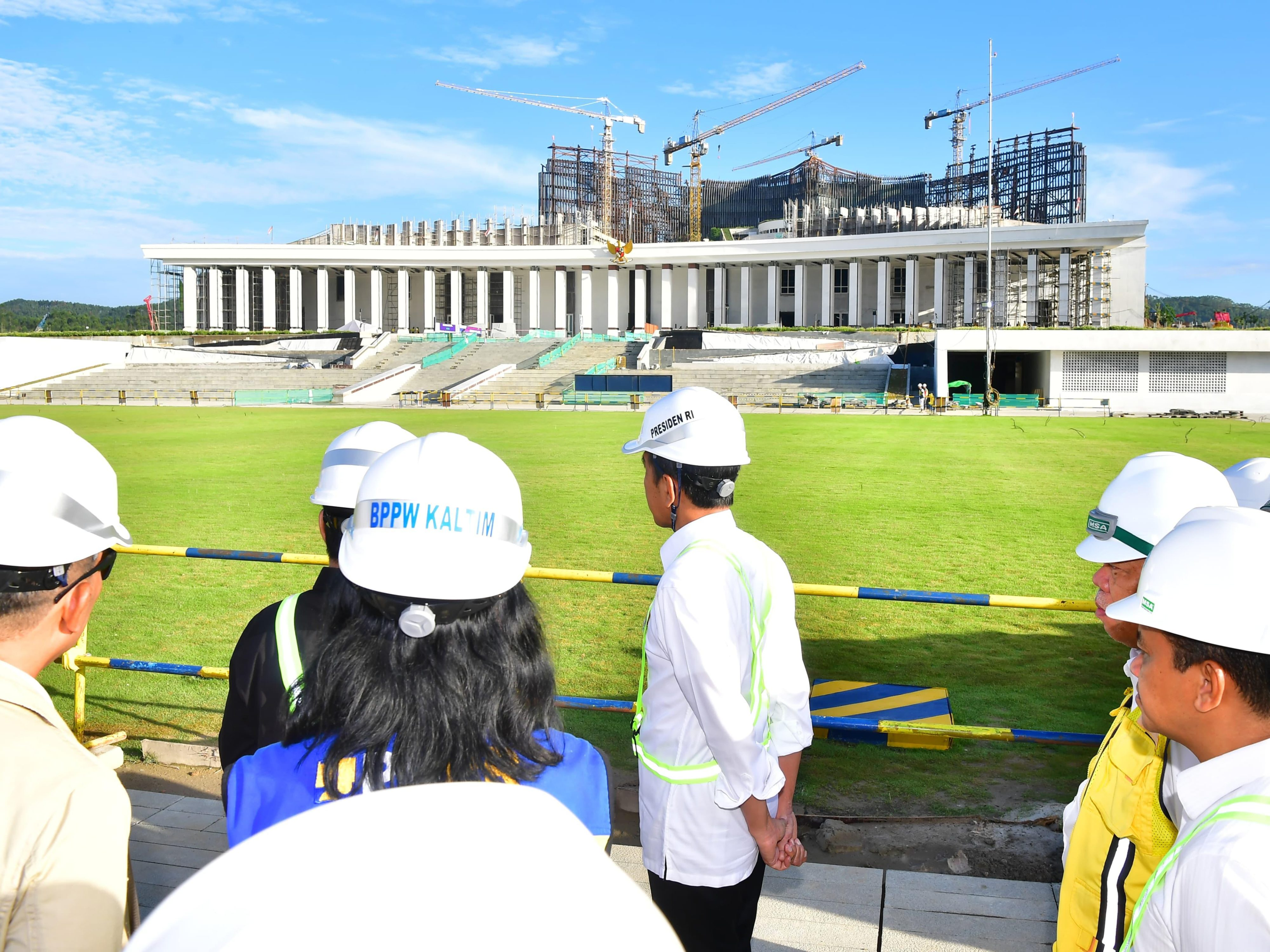
Widodo inspecting the Garuda Palace in June 2024, then under construction

Following the inauguration of Bambang Susantono as Head of the Authority, all 34 provinces across the country sent symbolic quantities of soil and water from historically or culturally significant sites in their respective provinces to be part of the new capital. East Kalimantan brought water and soil from Kutai Lama, where the historical Kutai Kartanegara kingdom was found. North Maluku brought a combination of soil and water from four main historical sultanates in Maluku, otherwise known as Maluku Kie Raha, which are Jailolo, Ternate, Tidore, and Bacan. Bengkulu brought soil from the location where Sukarno was exiled, while East Java also presented soil from sites of the former Majapahit Empire.

Initially, in July 2022, 100,000 workers from across Indonesia were deployed to the Nusantara site. However, this decision drew criticism from local organizations for not adequately involving local workers. In response to these concerns, President Joko Widodo instructed the Nusantara Capital City Authority to increase the workforce to between 150,000 and 200,000 to ensure the participation of local workers in the development of Nusantara.

Construction was delayed until after the COVID-19 vaccination campaign was completed in March 2022.

At a conference in Singapore in June 2023, Widodo tried to reassure investors that the project would continue irrespective of who would win the 2024 Indonesian presidential election, and that Nusantara was a "golden opportunity" for investment. By August 2023, the government had only allocated 20% of the total funds needed, and investors were reluctant to make up the shortfall because of political uncertainty and Indonesia's record of underinvestment in infrastructure.

In November 2023, Widodo admitted that not a single foreign investor had put money into Nusantara. Deputy for Funding and Investment at the IKN Authority, Agung Wicaksono, said that there were a number of foreign investors who were partners with domestic investors. These included Swissotel, which is owned by Accor Group, working with Hotel Nusantara and Sembcorp partnering with state-owned electricity company PLN. He also claimed there were 300 letters of intent. As of August 2024, IDR 56.2 trillion of investment had already entered Nusantara. On 13 September 2024, Swissôtel Nusantara, the first international 5-star accommodation in Nusantara was officially inaugurated by Widodo. Until the end of his presidency, Widodo had launched a total of eight groundbreaking ceremonies, with an investment value of Rp58,41 trillion from both local and foreign investors.

=== Transition and continuation under Prabowo Subianto ===
First Indonesia Independence Ceremony at the Garuda Palace, August 2024.

On 29 July 2024, outgoing Indonesian President Joko Widodo began working from the new presidential palace in Nusantara, where he planned to spend the final months of his presidency. On 12 August 2024, the first cabinet meeting session was held in Nusantara, marking the beginning of transition of political power from Jakarta to Nusantara.

On 3 June 2024, it was announced that Bambang Susantono, head of the Nusantara Capital City Authority, along with his deputy, Dhony Rahajoe, had resigned. Yusuf Wibisono, Director of the Institute for Demographic and Poverty Studies (Ideas), speculated that this might have been sparked by president-elect Prabowo being less enthusiastic about the project than Widodo was, he claimed Prabowo's statements at the time was the project would still continue, but would no longer be a priority. On 12 August 2024, Prabowo said he will continue the project and if possible he will finish it. He believes it will be long and difficult, but in 3–5 years the city can carry out its function as a capital well.

Nusantara was scheduled to be inaugurated as the capital city on 17 August 2024, coinciding with Indonesian Independence Day. However, the move did not take place. On that day Widodo held his first independence day celebration as President in the city. He initially said that 8,000 people were invited to the ceremony, but the number was later reduced to 1,300 due to concerns over unfinished facilities. The following week, Basuki Hadimuljono announced that Widodo's office may be moving there in September after the completion of IKN airport. Meanwhile, Widodo has said that he does not want to rush the planned transfer of civil servants to IKN in September if they are not ready yet despite the transfer.

President Prabowo Subianto has confirmed his administration's commitment to continuing the development of Nusantara as Indonesia's new capital. Prabowo envisions Nusantara, the capital city in East Kalimantan, as the political capital of Indonesia. In addition to building executive offices, buildings that will represent the other two branches of the Trias Politica—legislative and judicial—must also be completed. Prabowo emphasized this in his address at the final session of the Red White Cabinet Retreat in Magelang on 27 October 2024. Prabowo expressed hope that Nusantara could host the 2028 People's Consultative Assembly session, symbolizing the city’s role as the seat of government.

In February 2025, under the Presidential Instruction Number 1 of 2025, the budget allocated to the Ministry of Public Works for 2025 was reduced from 110.95 trillion to 29.57 trillion rupiahs, as an attempt to streamline state spending. As a result, the budget for the construction of IKN was blocked, and there were concerns of being stalled. The Nusantara Capital Authority is offering free land to foreign governments that establish their embassies in the new capital before 2028.

In later development, the head of Nusantara Capital City Authority, Basuki Hadimuljono, together with the Deputy Minister of Public Works, Diana Kusumastuti, stated that as of April 2025 the budget for IKN project was no longer blocked and the second phase of IKN constructed for the year 2025–2028 will be handled by Nusantara Capital City Authority. As of June 2025, investments acquired from various sources by Nusantara Capital City Authority for IKN project has reached around 135.1 trillion rupiahs.

On 30 July 2025, Prabowo signed Presidential Regulation Number 79 of 2025 concerning the government work plan update for 2025. In the regulation, Prabowo has ordered relocation of 1,700 to 4,100 civil servants to Nusantara within 2026, in order to achieve required target of readiness for Nusantara as national capital in 2028. With completion of the Vice Presidential Palace in January 2026, Office of the Vice President of Indonesia has begun relocation process to Nusantara shortly afterwards. Vice President Gibran Rakabuming Raka, Second Lady Selvi Ananda, and their 2 children will start to reside in Nusantara within 2026. Group B of the Presidential Security Force of Indonesia will move to Nusantara too along with the Second Family.

== Geography ==
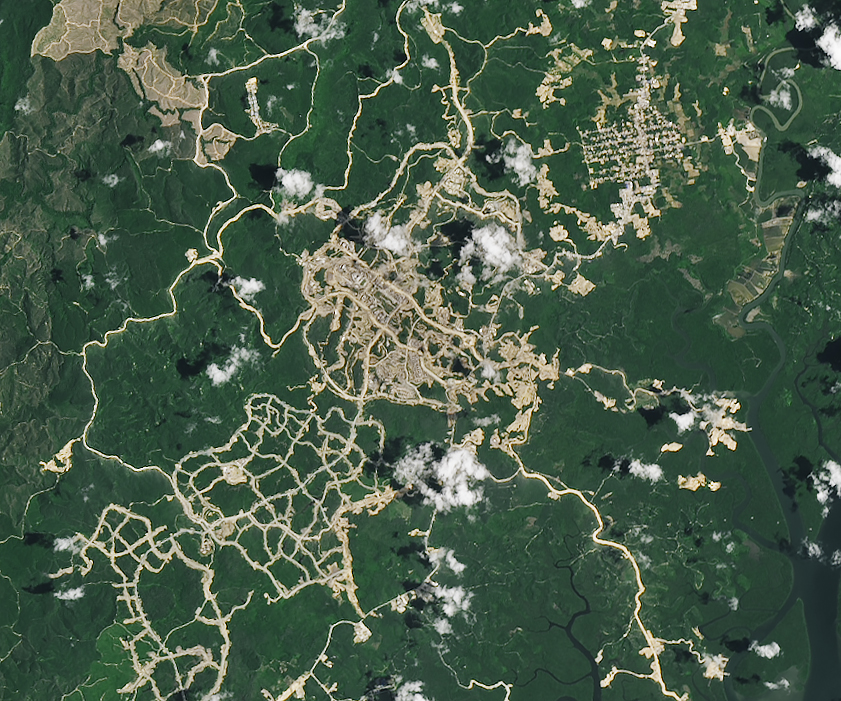
NASA's February 2024 Landsat image.

Nusantara is located on the east coast of Borneo, the world's third largest island. The city shares a land border with the province of East Kalimantan and has a coastal line that stretches eastward to the Makassar Strait and southward to Balikpapan Bay. Nusantara also has four islands (Benawa Besar, Batupayau, Jawang, and Sabut) located to the north of Balikpapan Bay. The city boasts a hilly landscape and was previously an industrial forest, with its concession owned by Sukanto Tanoto.

=== Zoning ===
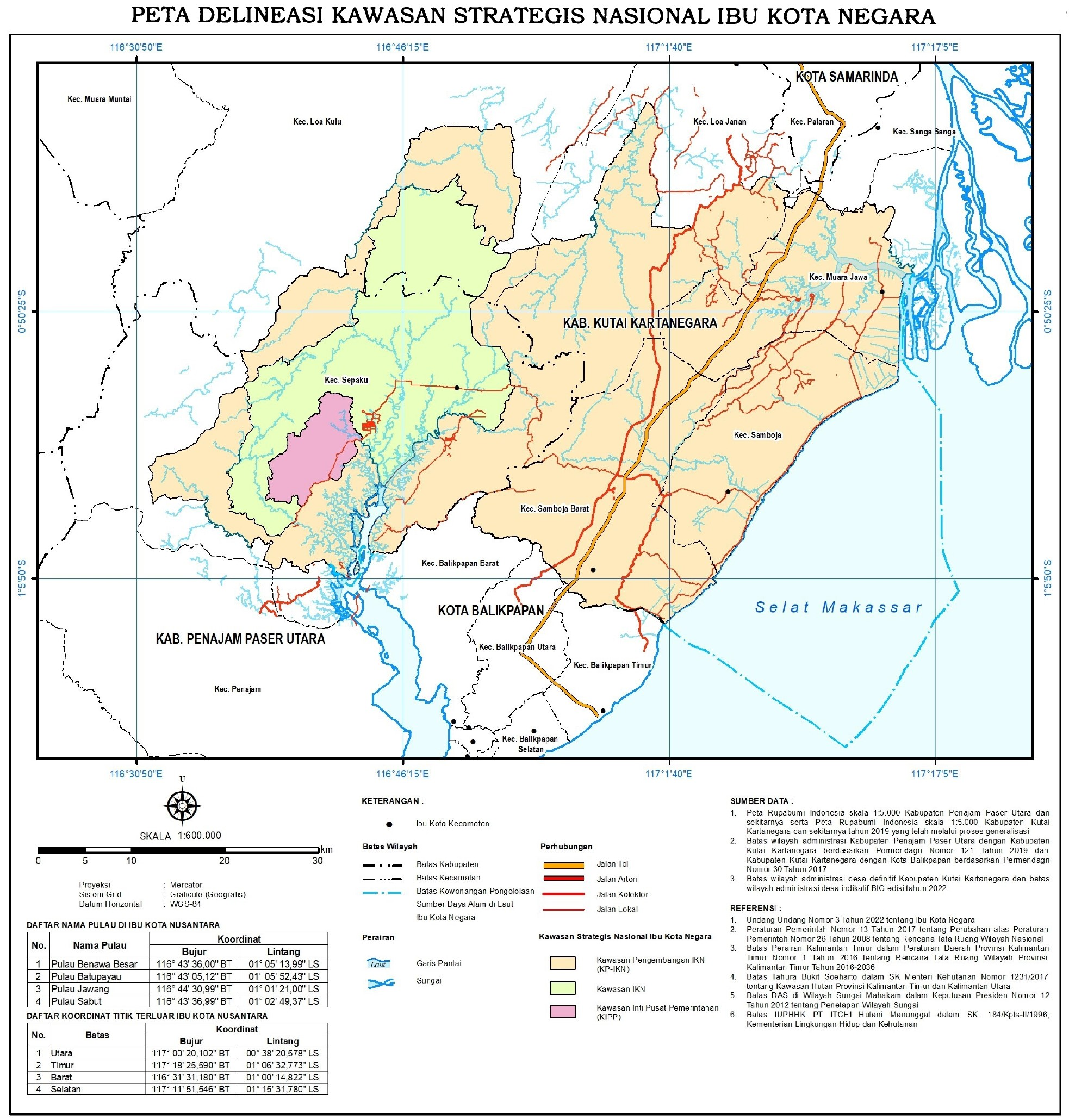
Map of Nusantara over the contemporary border of East Kalimantan. The pink area denotes the Main Governmental Area; the green area denotes the Capital City Area (encompassing parts of both Sepaku District in Penajam North Paser Regency and Loa Kulu District in Kutai Kartanegara Regency); the orange area denotes the Capital City Development Zone.

Nusantara encompasses an area of 2,560 km^{2} (990 mi^{2}) designated as National Strategic Area (Kawasan Strategis Nasional, KSN), with 68.56 km^{2} (26.47 mi^{2}) as the Main Governmental Zone (Kawasan Inti Pusat Pemerintahan, KIPP), 561.80 km^{2} (216.91 mi^{2}) as the Capital City Area (Kawasan Ibu Kota Negara), and the remainder as the Capital City Development Zone (Kawasan Pengembangan Ibu Kota Negara). The Nusantara metropolitan area will include the surrounding regencies and cities of East Kalimantan, such as Balikpapan and Samarinda.

Planned zoning in Nusantara
Zoning		Planned facilities
Main Governmental Zone		Presidential and vice-presidential palaces; Central government, legislatures, and judiciary office buildings; Cultural parks; and; Botanical gardens.
Capital City Area		Residences for civil servants, police, and armed forces; Education and medical facilities; University, and science and techno park; High-tech and clean industries; Research and development centers; Military bases; and; Other residential clusters.
Capital City Development Zone	Phase 1	A national park; Orangutan conservation facilities; and; Other residential clusters.
Capital City Development Zone	Phase 2	Metropolitan developments; and; Other developed areas connected to nearby provinces.

=== Climate ===
Nusantara features a tropical rainforest climate (Köppen: Af) as there is no real dry season. The city sees an average of 3,229 millimeters (127.1 inches) of rain per year.

Climate data for Nusantara (1991–2021 temperature, precipitation/rainfall, humidity, rainy days; 1999–2019 sunshine hours)
Month	Jan	Feb	Mar	Apr	May	Jun	Jul	Aug	Sep	Oct	Nov	Dec	Year
Mean daily maximum °C (°F)	29.1 (84.4)	29.4 (84.9)	29.5 (85.1)	29.4 (84.9)	29.2 (84.6)	28.8 (83.8)	28.5 (83.3)	29 (84)	29.6 (85.3)	29.9 (85.8)	29.5 (85.1)	29.3 (84.7)	29.3 (84.7)
Daily mean °C (°F)	25.2 (77.4)	25.3 (77.5)	25.4 (77.7)	25.5 (77.9)	25.6 (78.1)	25.3 (77.5)	25.1 (77.2)	25.3 (77.5)	25.7 (78.3)	25.8 (78.4)	25.5 (77.9)	25.4 (77.7)	25.4 (77.8)
Mean daily minimum °C (°F)	22.9 (73.2)	22.9 (73.2)	23 (73)	23.2 (73.8)	23.3 (73.9)	23.1 (73.6)	22.8 (73.0)	22.8 (73.0)	22.9 (73.2)	23.1 (73.6)	23.1 (73.6)	23.1 (73.6)	23.0 (73.4)
Average precipitation mm (inches)	331 (13.0)	296 (11.7)	352 (13.9)	359 (14.1)	277 (10.9)	223 (8.8)	186 (7.3)	149 (5.9)	158 (6.2)	226 (8.9)	315 (12.4)	357 (14.1)	3,229 (127.2)
Average precipitation days	20	18	20	20	21	19	18	15	15	18	20	21	225
Mean daily sunshine hours	7.6	7.6	7.4	7.3	7.2	7.2	7.2	7.4	7.7	7.7	7.5	7.7	7.5
Source: Climate-Data.org

== Government ==
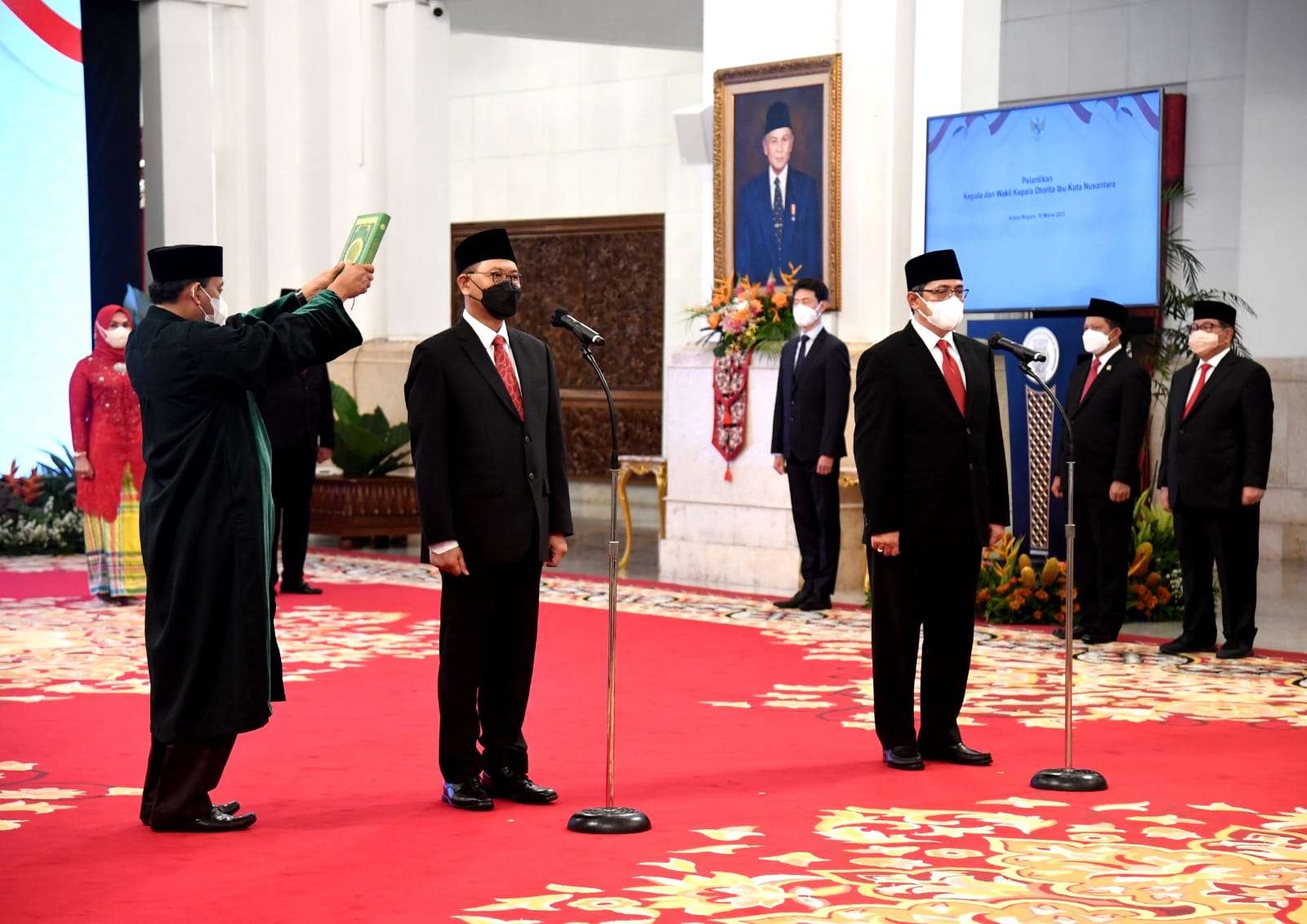
Inauguration of the head and deputy head of Nusantara Capital City Authority on 10 March 2022.

Nusantara is managed by an agency known as the Nusantara Capital City Authority (Indonesian: Otorita Ibu Kota Nusantara). Its structure differs from that of other cities in Indonesia, which are considered autonomous, self-governing entities separate from the central government. In contrast, the Capital City Authority is an agency directly accountable to the central government. It operates at the ministerial level and its Head is a cabinet-level official. Unlike governors, mayors, and regents, who are popularly elected in regional elections, the Head and Deputy Head of the Authority are appointed by the President.

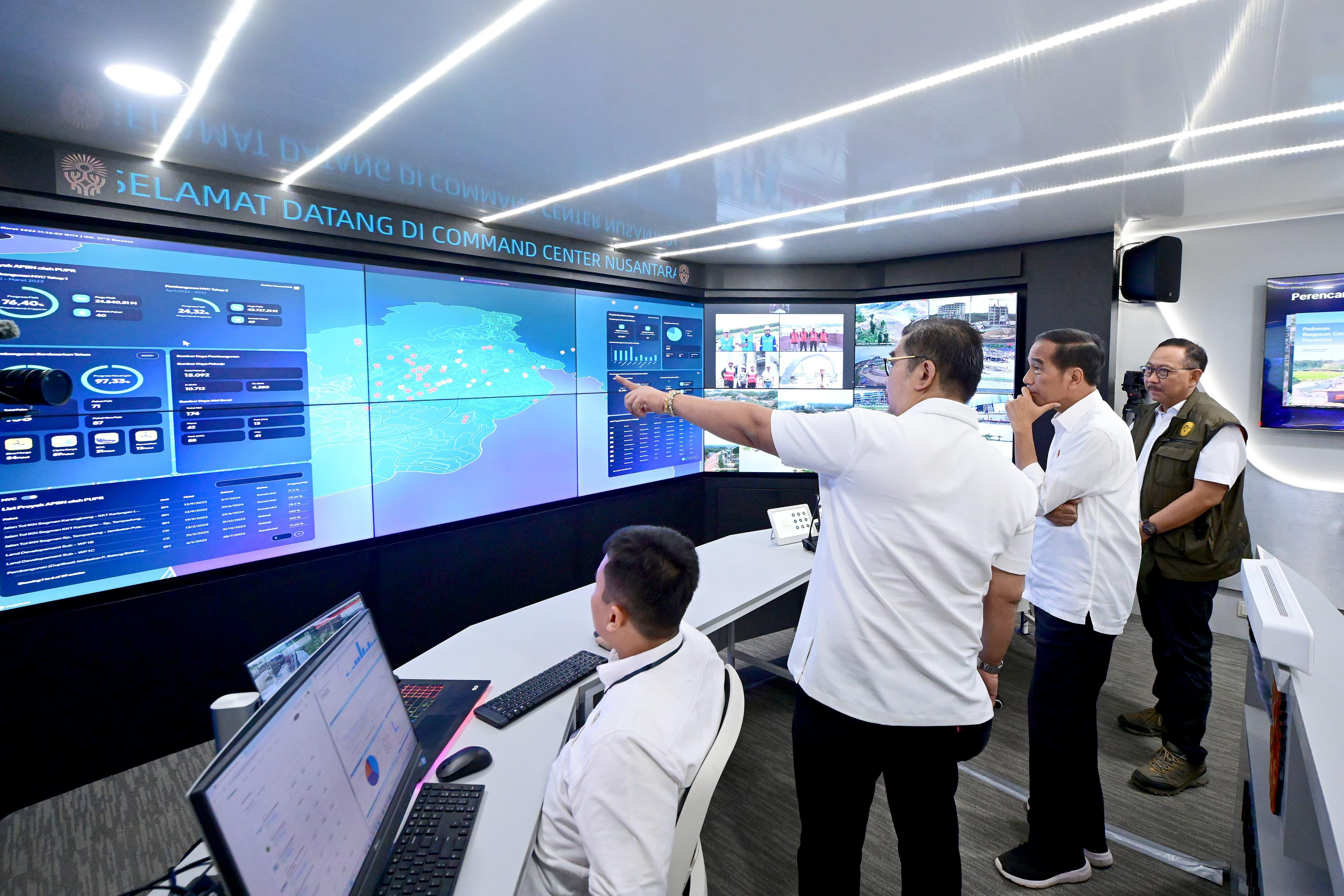
Nusantara Command Center, tasked with coordinating the capital development.

From March 2022 to June 2024, the authority was under the leadership of Head Bambang Susantono and Deputy Head Dhony Rahajoe. In June 2024, Bambang Susantono and Dhony Rahajoe resigned from their respective roles ahead of the inauguration of the city. Their motives is said to be personal reasons. Currently the head of the Nusantara Capital City Authority is Basuki Hadimuljono who was also the head of the Ministry of Public Works and Housing of Indonesia. While Bambang Susantono was appointed as the Republic of Indonesia Special Presidential Envoy for the International Cooperation on Nusantara.

The Capital City Authority announced that Nusantara would have special form of local governance and the administrative division of Nusantara would be different from other regions in Indonesia.

== Demographics ==
As of the end of 2025, its population was 147,320 people, living in the existing villages such as Bumi Harapan, Pemaluan, and Sepaku in the district of Sepaku.

== Transport ==
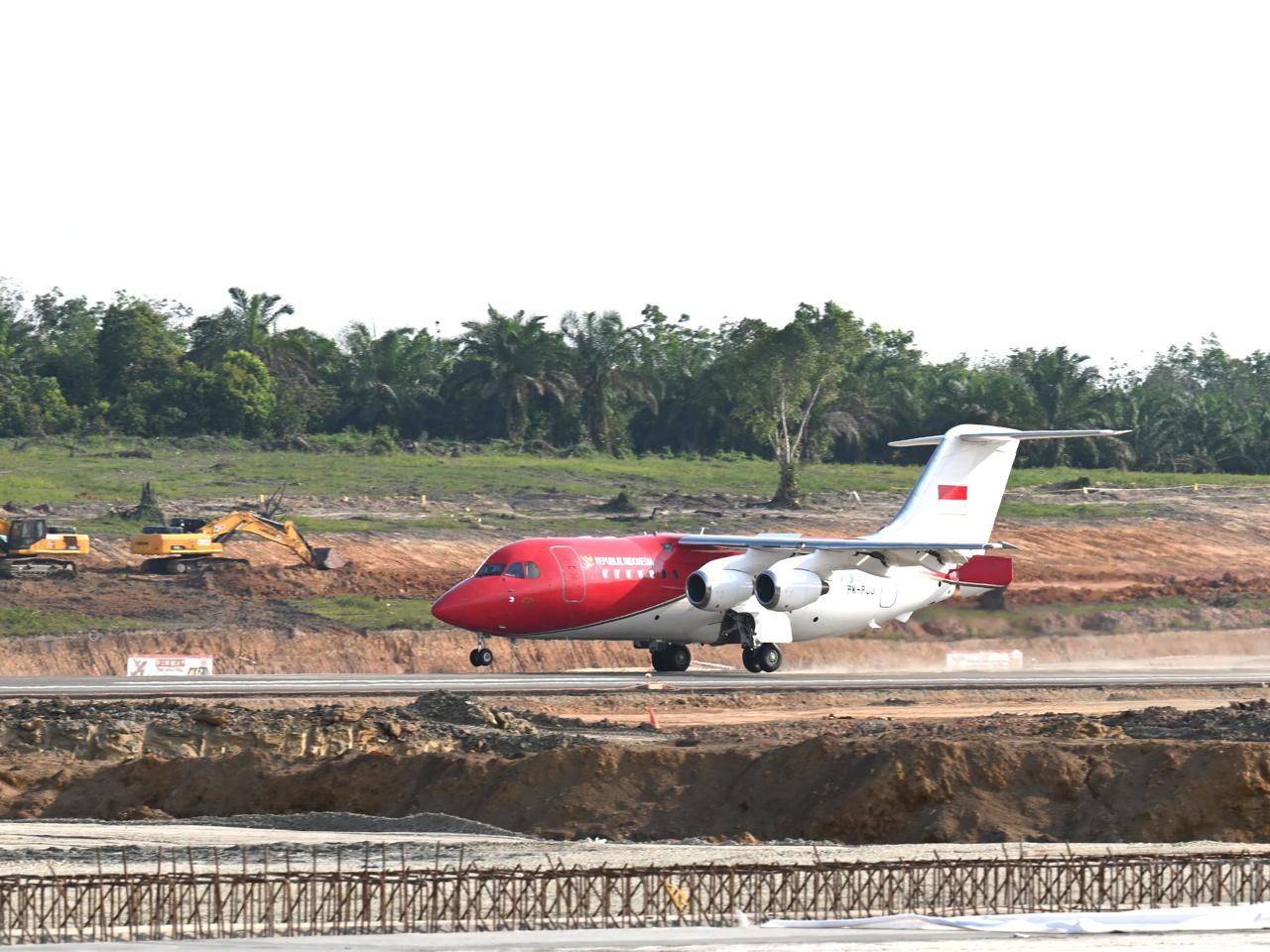
Indonesian presidential aircraft Avro RJ85 landing at Nusantara International Airport.

To achieve the goal of having 80% of transport supported by non-private means, a comprehensive public transportation network is planned for the new capital. The city's development focuses on creating dense, walkable areas and will feature a citywide network of cycling paths, two rail lines for a metro system, a bus rapid transit system, and autonomous minibuses as feeder services.

An automated guideway transit system will connect the new capital to the Balikpapan highway. However, trials of a Chinese-made Autonomous Rapid Transit (ART) were aborted in November 2024 when the vehicles were determined to be incapable of operating autonomously.

Additionally, a new intercity and regional rail system will be constructed to link the new capital with neighboring cities such as Samarinda and Balikpapan, forming part of the broader Trans Kalimantan Railway network that will connect the entire Indonesian side of Borneo Island with rail service.

A planned toll road spanning 47 km (29 mi) will be built to connect the government central area with Balikpapan. Nusantara will also be served by the nearby Aji Pangeran Tumenggung Pranoto International Airport located at Samarinda, the neighbouring city of the new capital, as well as Balikpapan's Sultan Aji Muhammad Sulaiman Sepinggan Airport. To support the two airports serving Nusantara, a new Nusantara International Airport will also be built in Penajam.

== Sports ==
The Indonesian government has prepared 50 hectares of land to be used as a training center for the Indonesia national football team, called the National Football Training Center. Construction began in September 2023, with an estimated investment of around IDR 180.6 billion. The facilities will include classrooms for tactical analysis, laundry rooms, and dedicated areas for physical training. There are also green open spaces, area roads, and parking areas. The long-term plan until 2026 includes the construction of a total of eight fields, a swimming pool, a tactical training area, and a mini stadium with a capacity of 600 seats. Therefore, the Football Association of Indonesia (PSSI) received the Gold Award from FIFA in the inaugural FIFA Forward Awards for the Asia and Oceania region, which was presented by FIFA President, Gianni Infantino, on 17 June 2025.

== International relations ==
=== Twin towns and sister cities ===
Nusantara is twinned with:

- Astana, Kazakhstan (2023)

=== Friendly cities ===
Nusantara also cooperates with:

- Brasília, Brazil
- Canberra, Australia
- Sejong, South Korea

== See also ==
- Capital of Indonesia – Historical capital cities of Indonesia
- Nusantara (archipelago) – Indonesian name of Maritime Southeast Asia
- Wawasan Nusantara – National vision of Indonesia
- List of purpose-built national capitals
