= Emblem of Nusantara =

Symbol of the planned capital city of Indonesia

Versions
- Version without logotype
- Armiger: Nusantara; Capital City Authority
- Alternative name(s): Pohon Hayat Nusantara
- Adopted: 30 April 2023

The emblem of Nusantara (Indonesian: Lambang Ibu Kota Nusantara) is the official emblem of the planned capital city of Indonesia, Nusantara. The emblem is themed the "Tree of Life of the Archipelago" (Indonesian: Pohon Hayat Nusantara) which is inspired by the symbolism of trees from the west to the east of Indonesia—the source of life as well as abundant natural wealth. The tree of life motif can be found in various cultures of Indonesia such as gunungan in Javanese puppetry, kalpataru motifs in various temples such as Borobudur and Pawon, Batang Garing of the Dayak people of Kalimantan, La Galigo literature of the Bugis people of South Sulawesi, to the pattern on the shield of the Asmat people of Papua.

== Elements and symbolism ==
The emblem of Nusantara consists of the following elements:

- Five roots symbolises the national ideology, Pancasila.
- Seven trunks symbolises the seven major island groups of Indonesia. The shape of the stream symbolises a maritime society that considers the sea and rivers as a link.
- A sphere with 17 blooming flowers symbolises eternal independence—17th of August being the date of the Proclamation of Indonesian Independence.

=== Font ===
The logotype "Nusantara" uses the "IKN Sutasoma" font inspired by Pallava script found on Yūpa inscription in Kutai, East Kalimantan, and is one of the oldest scripts in Southeast Asia.

== History ==
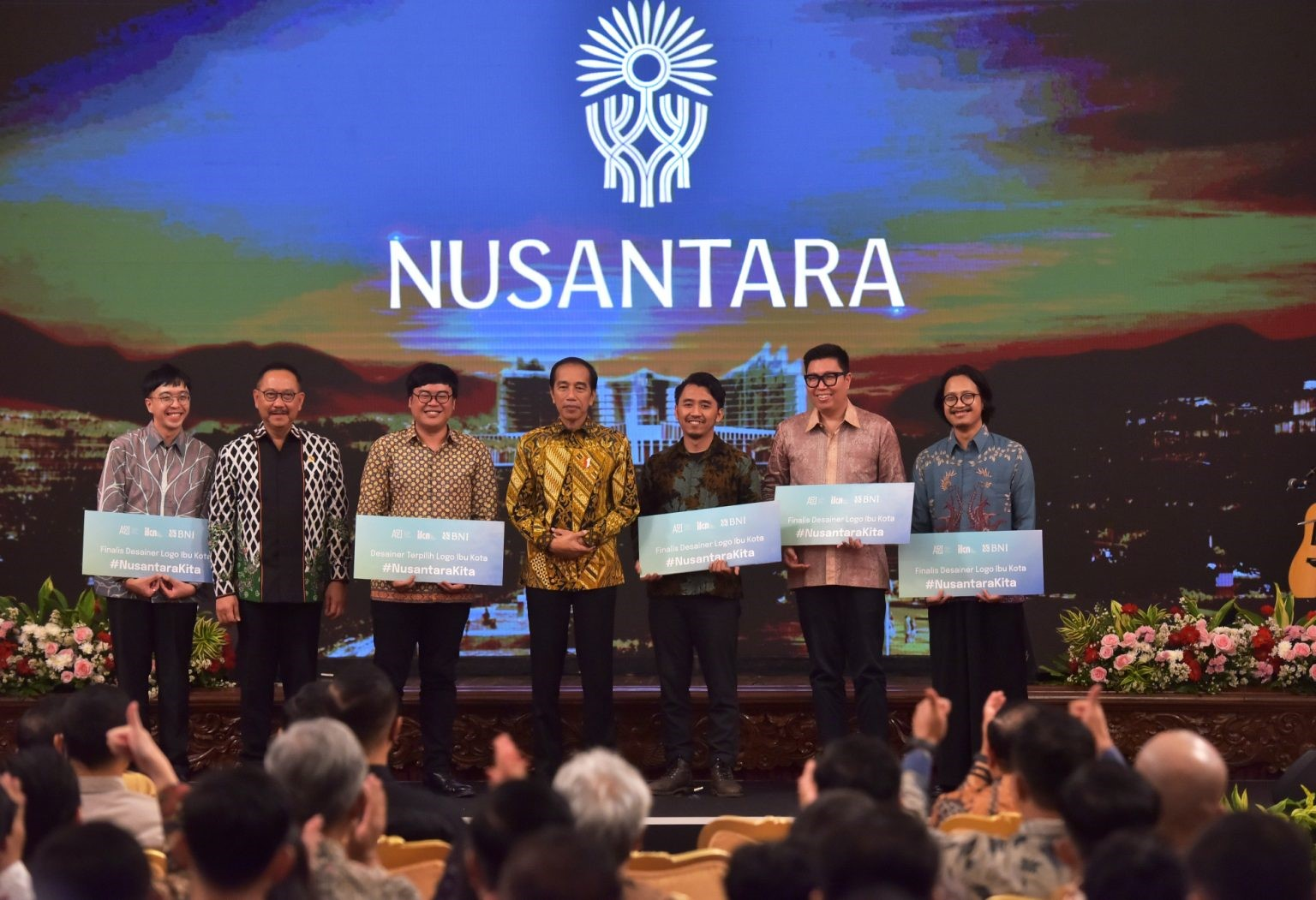
The emblem of Nusantara unveiled at the State Palace on 30th May 2023. Aulia Akbar (winner) can be seen on the third left.

The Nusantara Capital City Authority collaborated with the Indonesian Graphic Designers Association (ADGI) to design the city logo. Around 500 ADGI members sent their portfolios and CVs to be selected by the ADGI board of curators. The ten selected designers were asked to create their logo of Nusantara. President Joko Widodo then selected five out of the ten logos created to be made as public online voting through the Nusantara city website. The winner is entitled to a prize of 185 million rupiah.

Voting was conducted from 4th April to 20th May 2023. Ten electric bikes were raffled off to the public by providing their names and phone numbers during voting. More than 500 thousand people participated in the logo selection. On 30th April 2023, the Nusantara logo was officially unveiled at the State Palace with the winner being Aulia Akbar from Bandung.

Aulia Akbar is a graphic designer from Bandung and an alumnus of visual communication design at the National Institute of Technology (ITENAS) Bandung in 2014. Aulia is the co-founder of POT Branding House, a graphic design consultancy company in Bandung.

== Gallery ==
Initial promotional logo (2022‒2023)

Logo version without logotype

Logo of Radio Republik Indonesia station in Nusantara, featuring initial logo of the city (used until July 2024)

Logo of RRI IKN, featuring the current logo of the city (used since July 2024)
