= Nusantara Capital City Authority =

Capital government of Indonesia

- Otorita Ibu Kota Nusantara
- Emblem of Nusantara Initial promotional logo

Agency overview
- Formed: 22 February 2022; 4 years ago
- Jurisdiction: Indonesia (Nusantara)
- Agency executive: Basuki Hadimuljono, Head
- Website: ikn.go.id

Nusantara Capital City Authority (Indonesian: Otorita Ibu Kota Nusantara, abbreviated as OIKN) is a cabinet level-agency formed by the Indonesian government, working directly under the president of Indonesia. It is a special agency tasked with managing and governing the city of Nusantara, future capital of Indonesia located on Kalimantan.

A third cabinet reshuffle of Onward Indonesia Cabinet was done on 10 March 2022, with both the Head and Deputy Head of Nusantara Capital City Authority inaugurated at the reshuffle.

On 4 May 2022 the permanent constitution of the Authority, Presidential Regulation No. 62/2022 was published, formally establishing the Authority, although the date of the Decree backdated to 18 April 2022.

Since enactment of Presidential Decree No. 75/2024 on 11 July 2024, the authority also made as special region governing body of Nusantara, resulting the head of authority possessed political and governor power on par to a provincial governor.

== Powers ==
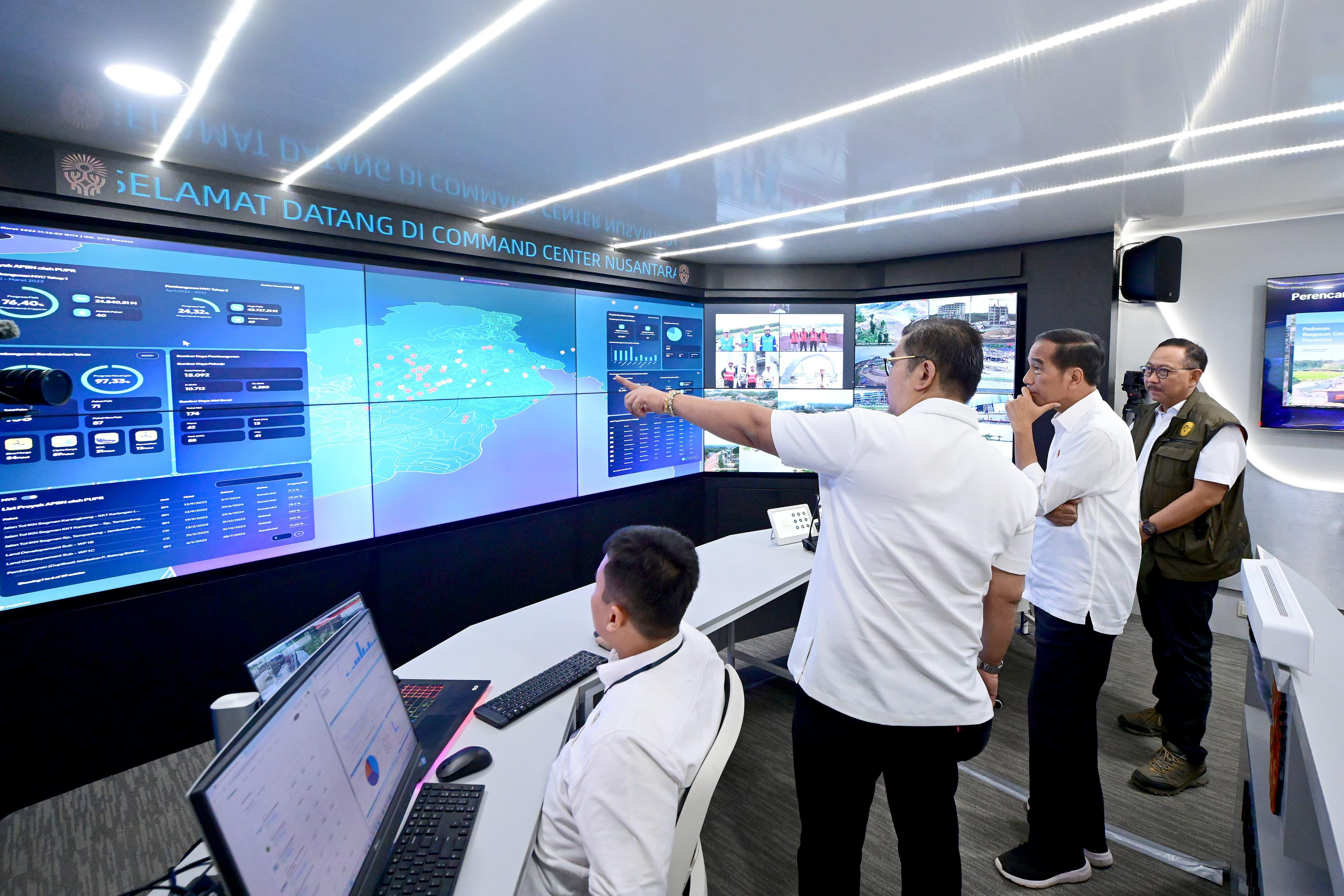
Nusantara Command Center, tasked with coordinating the capital development.

According to the State Capital Act, the Authority executive office has power and will enjoy the status of a ministerial office, but with additional unique powers vested to the office. The executive office shall hold both executive power (similar to all provincial governors) and legislative power of a provincial regional representative council, hence no election for provincial governor or legislative body shall ever be held in the future new capital. The capital residents will only participate in three elections: presidential, senatorial, and congressional elections, different from other provinces who may participate up to seven elections. These privileges resulted with the future capital of Indonesia in a unique position among other provinces of Indonesia, even from existing special regions of Indonesia.

Aside of the unique power given by the executive which combine the local executive and legislative function, the law also granted the executive office other powers in:

- Providing local investment licensing within Nusantara.
- Providing easiness for businesses within Nusantara.
- Providing special facilitation to parties which financially support the preparation, construction, and final move to the new capital.
- Providing development of Nusantara, its satellite cities, and surrounding areas.
- Managing finances and assets.
- Regulating and collecting its own local taxes imposed within Nusantara.
- Regulating land control, with special land rights and priority rights for purchasing land within Nusantara.
- Regulating environmental protection and management.
- Regulating disaster mitigation; and
- Implementing defense and security through integrated planning mechanisms as regulated through Nusantara Capital City Master Plan and the Strategic Plan for Nusantara Capital City National Strategic Area. For the defense and security affairs, it does not mean that the Authority having special forces under its control. The defense and security will still be provided by the central government, but its zonation determined by the Authority.

=== Government Regulation No. 27/2023 ===
On 15 May 2023, President Joko Widodo signed into law Government Regulation No. 27/2023, which detailed rights granted to the authority. Save for powers reserved for central government (namely, foreign policies, defense and security, legislation, national fiscal and monetary affairs, and religious affairs), the authority is granted special autonomy for:

1. Investment-related permits, ease of doing businesses, and special facilitations for government partners in capital city transition to Nusantara;
2. Spatial planning, land use management, environment management, and disaster countermeasures in Nusantara;
3. Strategic spatial planning, guidance, implementation, and monitoring in Nusantara; and
4. Strategic inter-institutional and inter-sectoral spatial planning use in Nusantara.

The regulation also specifies various public sectors of governance, usually granted in relations to regional governance, that is authorized for the Authority (a central government institution) to manage. For example, the Authority may add local contents in the curriculum for schoolchildren or implement stricter food safety code.

== Organization ==
On 4 May 2022, Presidential Regulation No. 62/2022 (Peraturan Presiden Nomor 62 Tahun 2022 tentang Otorita Ibu Kota Nusantara) was enacted as the founding document of the Authority, though the regulation itself was backdated to 18 April 2022. As of 31 January 2023, the head, deputy head, the Authority secretary, 3 deputies, head of Legal and Compliance Unit, and 10 directors and bureau heads have been appointed. The secretariat, deputies, as well as Legal and Compliance Unit are designated as the governing apparatus of the Authority (Perangkat Otorita Ibu Kota Nusantara), assigned to support the head and deputy head in executing their duties.

The structure of the Authority according to the Nusantara Capital City Authority Regulation No.1/2022 (Peraturan Kepala Otorita Ibu Kota Nusantara Nomor 1 Tahun 2022 tentang Organisasi dan Tata Kerja Otorita Ibu Kota Nusantara) is as follows:

=== Executives ===
- Head of the Capital City Authority (Indonesian: Kepala Otorita Ibu Kota Negara), which also a concurrent post with Governor of Special Capital Region of Nusantara (Indonesian: Kepala Pemerintah Daerah Khusus Ibu Kota Nusantara) since 11 July 2024; and
- Deputy Head of Capital City Authority (Indonesian: Wakil Kepala Otorita Ibu Kota Negara), whose main duties is to assist the head in executing their duties, filling for the head in their absence, and executing other duties as assigned, defacto Lieutenant Governor of the Special Capital Region.

=== Secretariat ===
The Authority Secretariat (Indonesian: Sekretariat Otorita Ibu Kota Negara), headed by a Secretary of the Authority, is tasked to coordinate Authority program implementation, to provide administrative guidance and support, as well as to handle the organizational administration of the Authority and its apparatus. To this end, the Secretariat is tasked to:

1. Prepare for the Authority's program planning, budget, institutions, and resources
2. Provide administrative guidance and support for the Authority management of human resources, finances, household affairs, archives, and documentations
3. Manage the Authority's public relations, protocols, and security details
4. Promote and foster forms of cooperation with the Authority
5. Guide and manage the Authority organization and administration
6. Manage various property, asset, and services that belonged to the State and/or the Authority, as well as its procurement.

The Secretariat is organized into several bureaus, as follow:

- Bureau of Planning, Organization, and Cooperations (Biro Perencanaan, Organisasi, dan Kerja Sama)
- Bureau of Human Resources and Public Relations (Biro Sumber Daya Manusia dan Hubungan Masyarakat)
- Bureau of General Affairs and Procurement (Biro Umum dan dan Pengadaan Barang/Jasa)
- Bureau of Finance, State-owned Properties, and Authority-controlled assets (Biro Keuangan, Barang Milik Negara, dan Aset Dalam Penguasaan).

=== Deputies ===
Seven Deputies (Indonesian: Deputi Kepala Otorita Ibu Kota Nusantara) are tasked to assist the Head and Deputy Head of the Authority, specifically concerning Capital City preparation, development, construction, and relocation from Jakarta. They are composed of:

- Deputy for Planning and Agrarian Affairs (Deputi Bidang Perencanaan dan Pertanahan)
  - Directorate of Macro Planning (Direktorat Perencanaan Makro)
  - Directorate of Micro Planning (Direktorat Perencanaan Mikro)
  - Directorate of Agrarian Affairs (Direktorat Pertanahan)
- Deputy for Development Monitoring (Deputi Bidang Pengendalian Pembangunan)
  - Directorate of Governance Monitoring and Building Permit (Direktorat Pengendalian Penyelenggaraan Pemerintahan dan Perizinan Pembangunan)
  - Directorate of Oversight, Monitoring, and Evaluation (Direktorat Pengawasan, Pemantauan, dan Evaluasi)
  - Directorate of Public Order (Direktorat Ketentraman dan Ketertiban Umum)
- Deputy for Socio-Cultural and Community Empowerment (Deputi Bidang Sosial, Budaya, dan Pemberdayaan Masyarakat)
  - Directorate of Basic Services (Direktorat Pelayanan Dasar)
  - Directorate of Community Empowerment (Direktorat Pemberdayaan Masyarakat)
  - Directorate of Culture, Tourism, and Creative Economy (Direktorat Kebudayaan, Pariwisata, dan Ekonomi Kreatif)
- Deputy for Green and Digital Transformation (Deputi Bidang Transformasi Hijau dan Digital)
  - Directorate of Development of Digital Ecosystem (Direktorat Pengembangan Ekosistem Digital)
  - Directorate of Green Transformation (Direktorat Transformasi Hijau)
  - Directorate of Data and Artificial Intelligence (Direktorat Data dan Kecerdasan Buatan)
- Deputy for the Environment and Natural Resources (Deputi Bidang Lingkungan Hidup dan Sumber Daya Alam)
  - Directorate of the Environment and Disaster Management (Direktorat Direktorat Lingkungan Hidup dan Penanggulangan Bencana)
  - Directorate of Development and Utilization of Forestry and Water Resource (Direktorat Pengembangan Pemanfaatan Kehutanan dan Sumber Daya Air)
  - Directorate of Food Security (Direktorat Ketahanan Pangan)
- Deputy for Finance and Investment (Deputi Bidang Pendanaan dan Investasi)
  - Directorate of Investment and Ease of Business (Direktorat Investasi dan Kemudahan Berusaha)
  - Directorate of Funding (Direktorat Pendanaan)
  - Directorate of Finances (Direktorat Pembiayaan)
- Deputy for Facilities and Infrastructures (Deputi Bidang Sarana dan Prasarana)
  - Directorate of Basic Facilities and Infrastructures (Direktorat Sarana Prasarana Dasar)
  - Directorate of Social Facilities and Infrastructures (Direktorat Sarana Prasarana Sosial)
  - Directorate of Building, Zoning, and Urban Management (Direktorat Pengelolaan Gedung, Kawasan dan Perkotaan).

=== Legal and Compliance Unit ===
The Legal and Compliance Unit of Nusantara Capital City Authority (Indonesian: Unit Satuan Kerja Hukum dan Kepatuhan Otorita Ibu Kota Nusantara), headed by a Unit Head, is tasked with providing the Authority with legal advice and advocacy, contract and legislation drafting, conducting internal supervision, coordinating compliance, violation prevention within the Authority.

The Unit is composed of several units, as follow:

- Directorate of Legal Affairs (Direktorat Hukum)
- Directorate of Compliance (Direktorat Kepatuhan)
- Directorate of Supervision and Internal Audit (Direktorat Pengawasan dan Audit Internal)

=== Advisory Staff ===
The Head is allowed to have up to 5 advisors (Indonesian: Staf Ahli Kepala Otorita dan Staf Khusus Kepala Otorita). They are tasked to advise the Head on matters relating to the administration of the Authority which is not previously handled by existing units.

=== Advisory board ===
The Presidential Regulation which founded the Authority, also allowed for the formation of a Nusantara Capital City Authority Advisory Board (Indonesian: Dewan Penasihat Otorita Ibu Kota Nusantara) by the President. The Advisory Board is not part of the Authority, which means that it does not have any governing role. As its name points out, it may only have advisory role within the administration of Nusantara.

It is yet to be known whether the board will have legislative powers alongside the Head of the Authority, as it has yet to be formed by the President.

== Funding ==
Indonesian Government allocated 71,8 trillion rupiahs for the operational of the Authority for 2022-2024 period from government fund. 5.5 trillion rupiahs for 2022, 27 trillion rupiahs for 2023, and 39.3 trillion rupiahs for 2024.

President-elect Prabowo Subianto expected to allocate 16 trillion rupiahs annually for the Authority during his presidency and will be so for the next 30 years by his successors. He expected during his presidency and 30 years in the future, foreign and domestic investment gradually will replace government spending in IKN development. On 22 January 2025, Prabowo approved 48.8 trillion rupiahs for 2025.

== History ==
=== Formation ===
The idea of moving Indonesia's national capital away from Java had been around for decades. In 2019 during the Widodo Administration, the plan to seriously move the center of power was put forward and announced to the public in a televised speech. During the annual 16 August address in 2019, in the presence of the People's Consultative Assembly, the president then officially inquired the two houses of the legislature for their support in the new capital initiative.

On 18 January 2022, the People's Representative Council (or DPR, the lower house of Indonesian legislature) passed the 2022 State Capital Act (Indonesian: Undang-Undang tentang Ibu Kota Negara), with the future capital named Nusantara. All factions in the house supported the passing of the bill into law except PKS, who questioned the necessity of moving the national capital in the middle of COVID-19 pandemic.

The capital will be governed by Nusantara Capital City Authority, governed by a Head and a Deputy Head, directly answerable to the President as a cabinet-level official. Meanwhile, the formation of the Authority, the appointment of officials, and the transfer of assets and personnel to Nusantara will happen following the issuance of relevant regulations.

=== Early leadership candidates ===
Four people were reported to have "higher probability" for the candidate:

- Abdullah Azwar Anas: former Regent of Banyuwangi Regency (2010-2015, 2016–2021).
- Basuki Tjahaja Purnama: former President Commissioner of Pertamina (2019–2024), former Governor of Jakarta (2014-2017), former Deputy Governor of Jakarta (2012-2014), and former Regent of East Belitung (2005-2006).
- Bambang Brodjonegoro: former Ministry of Research and Technology (2019-2021), head of the National Research and Innovation Agency (2019-2021), Minister of National Development Planning (2016-2019), and Minister of Finance (2014-2016).
- Tumiyana: current Chief Commissioner of Jakarta-Bandung high-speed railways project.

In addition, on 20 January 2022 President Widodo expressed his intention to set an architect and had experience in regional managing and governing as future CEO of the Authority. Currently, a few of people which met the criteria also added as candidates of the CEO position.

- Ridwan Kamil: architect, former mayor of Bandung, and former governor of West Java.
- Tri Rismaharini: architect and urban planner, former mayor of Surabaya, and current Minister of Social Affairs.
- Danny Pomanto: former architecture lecturer of Hasanuddin University, and current mayor of Makassar.

On 29 January 2022, the ruling party PDI-P, officially endorsed Basuki Tjahaja Purnama as candidate of the future CEO of Nusantara. Despite the official endorsement, the party stated that they would leave the choice up to the President. In addition to the endorsement of Purnama, PDI-P also officially confirmed its cadres as future CEO candidates aside of Purnama, Tri Rismaharini, Abdullah Azwar Anas, and Hendrar 'Hendri' Prihadi (the latter is the current mayor of Semarang).

Due to lack of Kalimantan politicians or officials or political figures as candidate of the post, local representative from South Kalimantan Regional Representative Council voiced concerns, as potentially the post might ignore any representation of local Kalimantan people. In response of the lack of native Kalimantan figures in the candidacies, on 15 February 2022 representatives of East Kalimantan locals, promoted their favored local candidates:

- Aji Muhammad Arifin, Sultan of Kutai Kartanegara Sultanate; and
- Aji Muhammad Jarnawi, Sultan of Paser Sultanate.

Both sultans are deemed as local figures respected by East Kalimantan people. Their names were sent to Jakarta to become the candidates of Nusantara CEO and Vice CEO for the President's consideration.

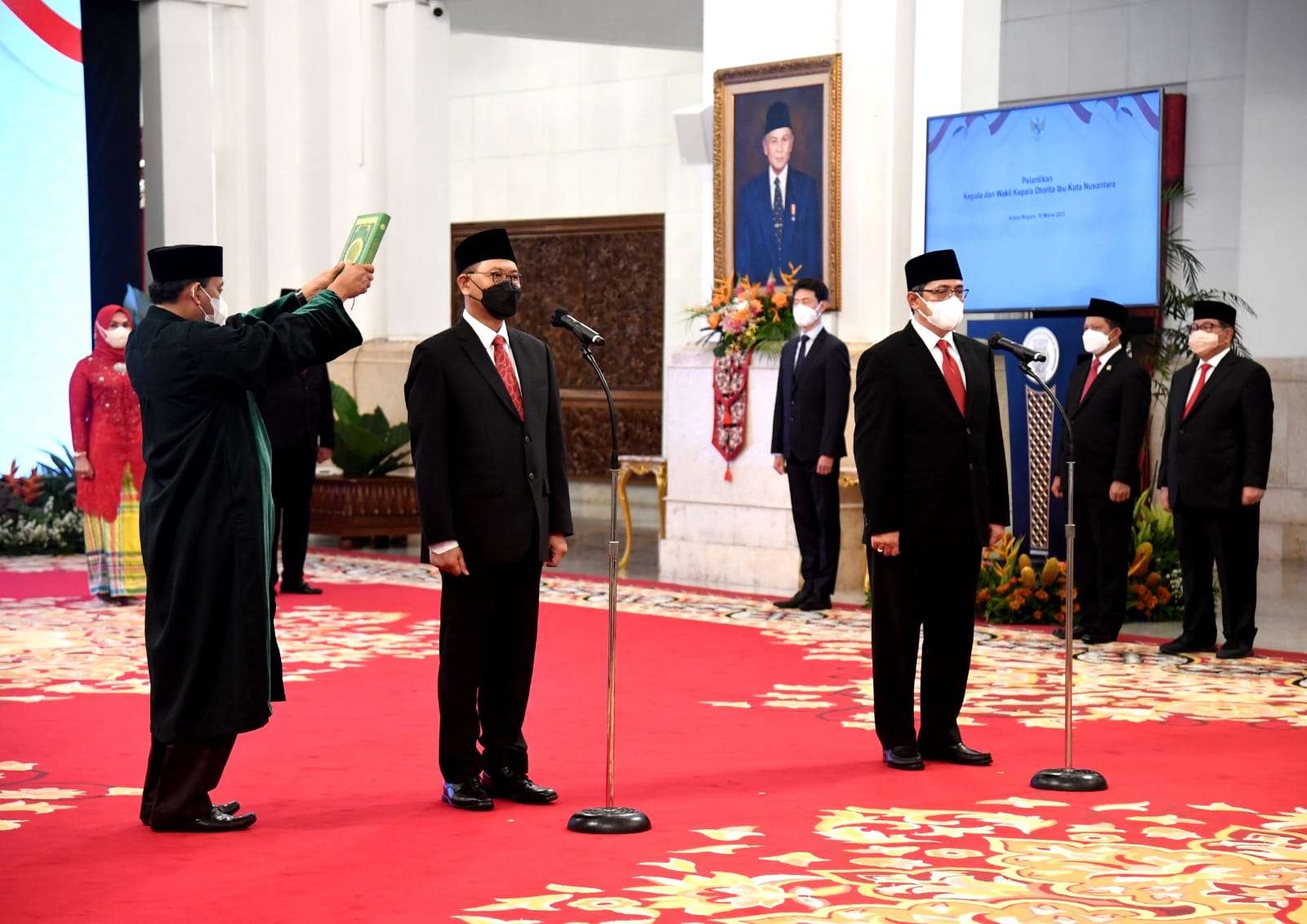
Inauguration of Susantono and Rahajoe as the first Head and Deputy Head of Nusantara Capital City Authority.

On 22 February 2022, Joko Widodo announced his own favored candidate for the executives. While he did not mentioned the name, his revelation of additional criteria of independent non-partisan expert for the office made the previous candidate names become unlikely. At the same time from Joko Widodo announcement, a new name was leaked to the press from unnamed officials that Bambang Susantono, former Vice Minister of Transportation during Second United Indonesia Cabinet (2009-2014) and the Vice President for Knowledge Management and Sustainable Development of the Asian Development Bank became the strongest possible candidate for the office holder. Reportedly Bambang Susantono who was the second choice candidate became front runner, after the first, Basuki Tjahaja Purnama turned down the offer from Joko Widodo.

On 9 March 2022 it was announced that Bambang Susantono and Dhony Rahajoe (managing director of the President Office in Sinar Mas Land) will be inaugurated as Head and Deputy Head of the Capital City Authority, and finally inaugurated on 10 March 2022.

=== Transition process ===
On 5 May 2022, Inter-ministerial Transition Team is activated thru State Minister Decree No. 105/2022. The Inter-ministerial Transition Team is tasked to provide support for the acceleration of preparation, development, and relocation of the State Capital. The team also tasked for supervising and garnering active role from the elements of the relevant ministries/institutions involved in the capital relocation process.

=== Activation ===
On 13 October 2022, the Authority formally activated with inauguration of some officers and deputies.

=== Resignation ===
On 3 June 2024, the Head of the Authority Bambang Susantono and his Deputy Dhony Rahajoe resigned. President Joko Widodo then appoint Basuki Hadimuljono as an acting Head and Raja Juli Antoni as its Deputy.

=== Move into the IKN ===
On 3 March 2025, all employees of the authority started working at their newly-built office in Nusantara. The building has five floors and complemented with facilities of technology, informatics, and communications. It is also located near to the Point Zero of Nusantara.

== Governance ==
=== Head of the Authority ===
The Head is the highest position inside the Nusantara Special Capital Region Authority (Indonesian: Pemerintah Daerah Khusus Ibu Kota Nusantara). The office is a cabinet-level office equal to a minister, which means the Head and the Authority is directly responsible to the president. As with most cabinet-level office, the appointment require prior consultation with the People's Representative Council.

The Head will serve for a five-year term, can be reappointed for another term, and can be dismissed during their term in office.

No.	Portrait	Name	Political affiliation	Office term		
No.	Portrait	Name	Political affiliation	Term start	Term end	Term length
1		Bambang Susantono	Independent	10 March 2022	3 June 2024	2 years, 85 days
—		Basuki Hadimuljono	Independent	3 June 2024	20 October 2024	139 days
2		Basuki Hadimuljono	Independent	5 November 2024	Incumbent	1 year, 358 days

Note: Italic denotes acting Head of the Authority

=== Deputy Head of the Authority ===
The office is equal to a deputy minister, which means the Deputy Head is also directly responsible to the president. The appointment require prior consultation with the People's Representative Council, despite the office of Deputy Head is not a cabinet-level official.

The Deputy Head will serve for a five-year term, can be reappointed for another term, and can be dismissed during their term in office.

No.	Portrait	Name	Political affiliation	Office term		
No.	Portrait	Name	Political affiliation	Term start	Term end	Term length
1		Dhony Rahajoe	Independent	10 March 2022	3 June 2024	2 years, 85 days
–		Raja Juli Antoni	Indonesian Solidarity Party	3 June 2024	20 October 2024	139 days
–	Vacant			20 October 2024	Incumbent	2 years, 9 days

Note: Italic denotes acting Deputy Head of the Authority

== Criticisms ==
Indonesian political scientists were alarmed due to the nature and power given to the Authority as institution and vas power is hold by the executives, and criticized the form since the bill under was discussion. Indonesian political scientists fear that with such large power given by the agency and the executives will lead into formation of "local autocracy" within Indonesia democracy.

On 2 February 2022, a group of citizens filed a constitutional review request to the Constitutional Court. They questioned the need and the legality of the Act, which was promulgated in a speedy manner in the middle of COVID-19 pandemic, as well as the constitutionality of having a capital region directly governed by the central government via the Authority.

National Research and Innovation Agency political researcher Wasisto Raharjo Jati commented, with such power and prestige hold by the Authority, the CEO post is very promising for politicians and there is a chance for the politicians use it as stepping stone for presidency.

Elements within the central government bureaucracy had voiced their reluctance to be transferred to the new capital, with some asked to be transferred to Jakarta local government instead, and thus stay in Jakarta.
