= Sulaiman Umar Siddiq =

Indonesian politician (born 1982)

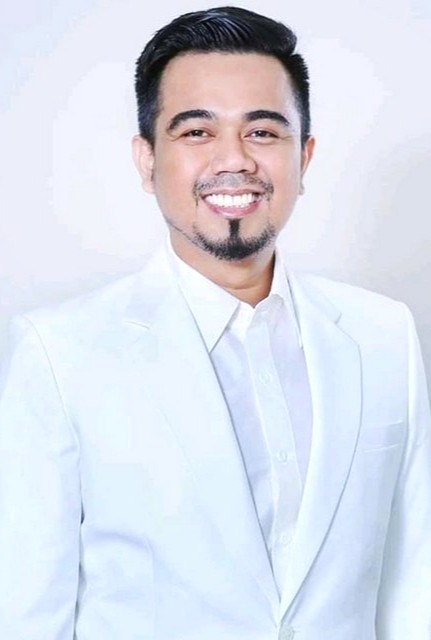

Deputy Minister of Forestry
- In office 21 October 2024 – 17 September 2025
- President: Prabowo Subianto
- Minister: Raja Juli Antoni
- Preceded by: Alue Dohong (as Deputy Minister of Environment and Forestry)
- Succeeded by: Rohmat Marzuki

Member of the House of Representatives
- In office 1 October 2019 – 10 August 2021
- Succeeded by: Novri Ompusunggu
- Constituency: South Kalimantan II

Personal details
- Born: 16 April 1982 (age 44)
- Party: PDI-P (until 2021)

Sulaiman Umar Siddiq (born 16 April 1982) is an Indonesian politician serving as deputy minister of forestry since 2024. From 2019 to 2021, he was a member of the House of Representatives. During the 2024 presidential election, he served as director of Prabowo Subianto's campaign in South Kalimantan.
