= Raja Juli Antoni =

Indonesian politician (born 1977)

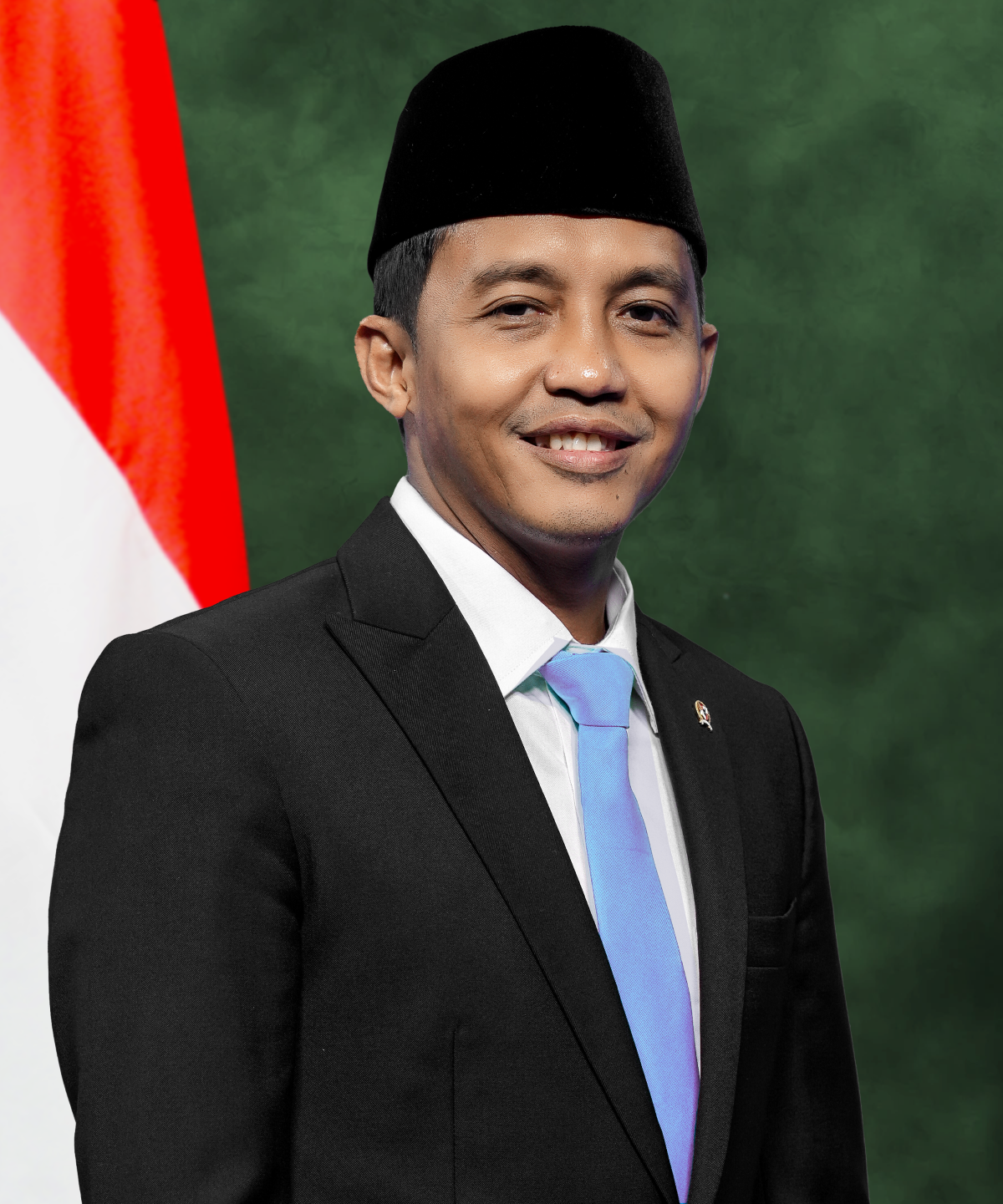
- Official portrait, 2025

11th Minister of Forestry
- Incumbent
- Assumed office 21 October 2024
- President: Prabowo Subianto
- Deputy: Sulaiman Umar Siddiq (2024–2025); Rohmat Marzuki (2025–)
- Preceded by: Siti Nurbaya Bakar (as Minister of Environment and Forestry)

2nd Deputy Minister for Agrarian Affairs and Spatial Planning
- In office 15 June 2022 – 20 October 2024
- President: Joko Widodo
- Minister: Hadi Tjahjanto; Agus Harimurti Yudhoyono
- Preceded by: Surya Tjandra

Acting Deputy Head of Nusantara Capital City Authority
- In office 3 June 2024 – 20 October 2024
- President: Joko Widodo
- Head: Basuki Hadimuljono (acting)
- Preceded by: Dhony Rahajoe

1st Secretary-General of Indonesian Solidarity Party
- Incumbent
- Assumed office 25 September 2023
- Chairman: Kaesang Pangarep
- Preceded by: Office established
- Succeeded by: I Putu Yoga Saputra (acting)

Personal details
- Born: July 13, 1977 (age 49) Pekanbaru, Riau, Indonesia
- Party: Independent
- Other political affiliations: PDI-P (2009–2014); PSI (2014–2026)
- Education: Syarif Hidayatullah State Islamic University Jakarta; University of Bradford; University of Queensland
- Occupation: Politician
- Website: https://rajajuliantoni.com/

Raja Juli Antoni (born 13 July 1977) is an Indonesian politician who currently serves as Minister of Forestry and Secretary General of the Indonesian Solidarity Party (PSI). He previously served as Deputy Minister of Agrarian Affairs and Spatial Planning in Indonesia between June 2022 and October 2024. He is one of the founders of the Indonesian Solidarity Party.

== Education ==
Raja Juli Antoni is the son of Raja Ramli Ibrahim, a Riau public figure who once served as Deputy Chair of the Muhammadiyah Riau Regional Leadership (PW).

Raja is an alumnus of the Darul Arqam Muhammadiyah Islamic Boarding School, Garut, West Java.

He received a bachelor's degree in Al-Qur'an and Tafsir Science from IAIN Syarif Hidayatullah in 2001 with a thesis Ayat-ayat Jihad: Studi Kritis terhadap Penafsiran Jihad sebagai Perang Suci (Jihad Verses: Critical Study of the Interpretation of Jihad as Holy War).

Raja then continued his master's degree at the Department of Peace Studies, University of Bradford, England, through a Chevening scholarship in 2004 and completed it with a thesis, The Conflict in Aceh: Searching for a Peaceful Conflict Resolution Process.

With the Australian Development Scholarship (ADS), Raja continued his doctoral studies at the School of Political Science and International Studies at the University of Queensland, Australia in 2010. He obtained a PhD degree with a dissertation on Religious Peacebuilders: The Role of Religion in Peacebuilding in Conflict Torn Society in Southeast Asia, using case studies of Mindanao (Southern Philippines) and Maluku (Indonesia).

He became the executive director of The Indonesian Institute (TII). He is also quite active in writing opinions published in several media.

== Career ==
A former General Chairperson of the Central Leadership of the Muhammadiyah Student Association (PP IPM) for the 2000–2002 period, he also became the executive director of the Maarif Institute.

In 2009, he ran in the 2009 Legislative General Election from the Indonesian Democratic Party of Struggle, representing West Java IX district (Subang, Sumedang, and Majalengka Regencies). However, he was not elected because he lost to Maruarar Sirait and Tubagus Hasanuddin.

He was a candidate for General Chairperson of PP Muhammadiyah for the 2015–2020 period but then resigned because he wanted to concentrate in politics as Secretary-General of the Indonesian Solidarity Party, which he had just founded with several other young politicians.

On 3 June 2024, Raja was appointed as the acting deputy head of the Nusantara Capital City Authority following the resignation of Dhony Rahajoe. With the end of his tenure as Deputy Minister of Agrarian Affairs and Spatial Planning on 20 October 2024, his term as the acting deputy head of the Nusantara Capital City Authority also ended.
