= Dhony Rahajoe =

Indonesian architect (born 1966)

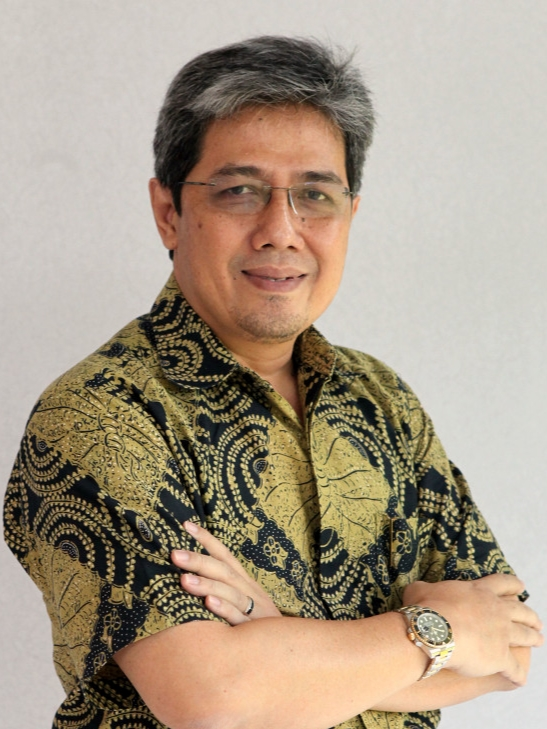
- Dhony in 2022

1st Deputy Head of Nusantara Capital City Authority
- In office 10 March 2022 – 3 June 2024
- Head: Bambang Susantono
- Preceded by: Office created
- Succeeded by: Raja Juli Antoni (acting)

Personal details
- Born: 8 September 1966 (age 60) Jakarta, Indonesia
- Party: Independent
- Spouse: Dewi
- Children: 3
- Education: Bandung Institute of Technology; Boston University
- Profession: Architect

Dhony Rahajoe (born 8 September 1966) is an Indonesian architect and a former real estate developer executive who is the Deputy Head of Nusantara Capital City Authority (OIKN) since 10 March 2022. He previously served as managing director, President Office of Sinar Mas Land, a pillar of Sinar Mas Group. He is a mastermind behind projects of Sinar Mas Land, including elite housings in Indonesia, and also smart cities, housings, industrial and commercial buildings, hotels, and resorts scattered from Asia to Europe. He was described as "a very low profile figure with extreme calm" and "had been not under spotlight of publicities".

== Early life and education ==
Dhony born in Jakarta on 8 September 1966. He graduated from Architecture Department of Bandung Institute of Technology from Class of 1984. He later obtained Master of Business Administration degree from the Boston University.

== Career ==
Dhony worked as architect for more than 20 years for PT Bumi Serpong Damai, the developer company of Bumi Serpong Damai (BSD City), a planned city built by Sinar Mas Group, before finally become a managing director of Sinar Mas Land in 2015. During his time in PT Bumi Serpong Damai, he is the lead architect and landscaper of BSD City. As he affiliated to BSD City, he also previously also consultant of State Secretary Pratikno and Minister of Public Works and Housing Basuki Hadimuljono, when two of them assigned by Joko Widodo to study about building new capital.

Aside of being leader of Sinar Mas Land, Dhony also member of Board of Supervisors of Bandung Science Technology Institute, a private university in Bandung founded affiliated with Sinar Mas Group and feeder university of Bandung Institute of Technology.

== Deputy Head of Nusantara Capital City Authority ==
During his visit to BSD City on 24 December 2021, Joko Widodo personally approached Dhony along with his ministers, Banten governor Wahidin Halim, and Tangerang Regent Ahmed Zaki Iskandar. Joko Widodo impressed with green city concept and unique technologies developed by Dhony, and subsequently chose him as figure fit for his future Nusantara Capital City Authority.

He later appointed as Deputy Head of Nusantara Capital City Authority on 10 March 2022, accompanying Bambang Susantono who appointed as Head of the Nusantara Capital City Authority.

On 3 June 2024, Dhony resigned as deputy head of authority. President Joko Widodo appointed deputy minister for agrarian affairs and spatial planning Raja Juli Antoni as acting deputy head.

== Post Deputy Head of Nusantara Capital City Authority ==
After no longer in OIKN, he becomes a Chief Commissioner of PT Pembangunan Perumahan (PTPP), a state-owned enterprise.

He becomes one of executive commissioner in Indonesian Chamber of Commerce and Industry effective since 2024 Congress of the Indonesian Chamber of Commerce and Industry.

== Personal life ==
Dhony is married to Dewi. Together, they had three children, 2 daughters, and 1 son: Denise, Anya, and Dio.

Dhony is a Muslim. Dhony, and also Bambang, supported by Nahdlatul Ulama young activists.
