= Basuki Hadimuljono =

Indonesian bureaucrat (born 1954)

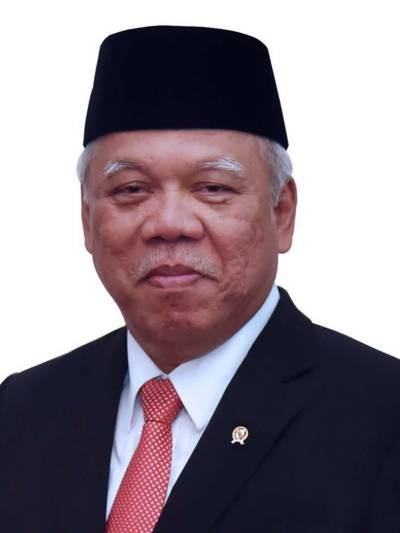
- Official portrait, 2019

2nd Head of the Nusantara Capital City Authority
- Incumbent
- Assumed office 3 June 2024; Acting until 5 November 2024
- President: Joko Widodo; Prabowo Subianto
- Deputy: Raja Juli Antoni
- Preceded by: Bambang Susantono

Minister of Public Works and Public Housing
- In office 27 October 2014 – 20 October 2024
- President: Joko Widodo
- Deputy: John Wempi Wetipo (2019–2022)
- Preceded by: Djoko Kirmanto (public works); Djan Faridz (public housing)
- Succeeded by: Dody Hanggodo (public works); Maruarar Sirait (housing and residential area)

Personal details
- Born: 5 November 1954 (age 71) Surakarta, Central Java, Indonesia
- Spouse: Kartika Nurani
- Children: 3
- Education: Gadjah Mada University (Ir.); Colorado State University (MSc), (PhD)

Mochamad Basuki Hadimuljono (born 5 November 1954) is an Indonesian bureaucrat who has served as head of the Nusantara Capital City Authority since 2024. He previously served as minister of public works and public housing during the presidency of Joko Widodo. Prior to his appointment as its minister, he had worked for the ministry for nine years.

Basuki was born in Surakarta; his father was a member of the Indonesian Army. After obtaining his bachelor's from Gadjah Mada University in 1979, he moved into the ministry of public works and began his career there. Later, he obtained his master's and doctorate from Colorado State University. He rose up the ranks and served as inspector-general and director-general there, until he accepted an appointment from Joko Widodo to serve as minister after over 30 years as a public servant in 2014.

Due to Widodo's infrastructure programs, Basuki's ministry received significant portions of the budget during his tenure, measuring Rp 107.3 trillion (US$ 7.5 billion) for the 2018 fiscal year. Projects under his tenure included mass construction of public housing, road infrastructure and water reservoirs.

== Early life ==
Basuki was born in Surakarta on 5 November 1954, as the fourth son of a soldier in the Indonesian Army with seven siblings. As a child, he would move often due to his father's stationing. He completed his elementary school in Palembang, middle school in Papua, and high school in Surabaya.

=== Family ===
He is married to Kartika Nurani and the couple has three children–Dewi (born 1987), Neil (born 1992) and Dira (born 1994).

=== Early education ===
During his high school period, he was active in school bands and played the drum. After completing high school at SMA Negeri 5 Surabaya (id), he was admitted into Gadjah Mada University where he studied engineering geology. He graduated from there in 1979, at age 25. In 2024, he would be elected as head of UGM's alumni association.

== Career ==
After graduating from UGM, Basuki landed a job at the ministry of public works as a civil servant. After several years, he obtained a scholarship from the ministry to resume his studies, and obtained both a master's and a doctorate from Colorado State University at ages 35 and 38, respectively. Following his continued studies, he returned to Indonesia and continued his work at the ministry, receiving an award as the ministry's employee of the year in 1995. Later on, he was promoted to be the head of the ministry's research and development body between 2005 and 2007. After this, he became the ministry's inspector general until 2013. The last position he held prior to his ministerial appointment in October 2014 was director-general of spatial planning.

During his time at the ministry, he had participated in several national-level working groups including ones related to rehabilitation following the 2004 Indian Ocean earthquake and tsunami in Aceh, handling of the Sidoarjo mud flow (2006–2007), reparation of the Purbaleunyi Toll Road and management of food scarcity in Yahukimo Regency (both in 2006).

In May 2012, Basuki was also appointed the chief commissioner at Wijaya Karya, a state-owned construction company. He also served as a vice president of the International Commission on Irrigation and Drainage for the 2013–2016 tenure.

== Cabinet minister ==
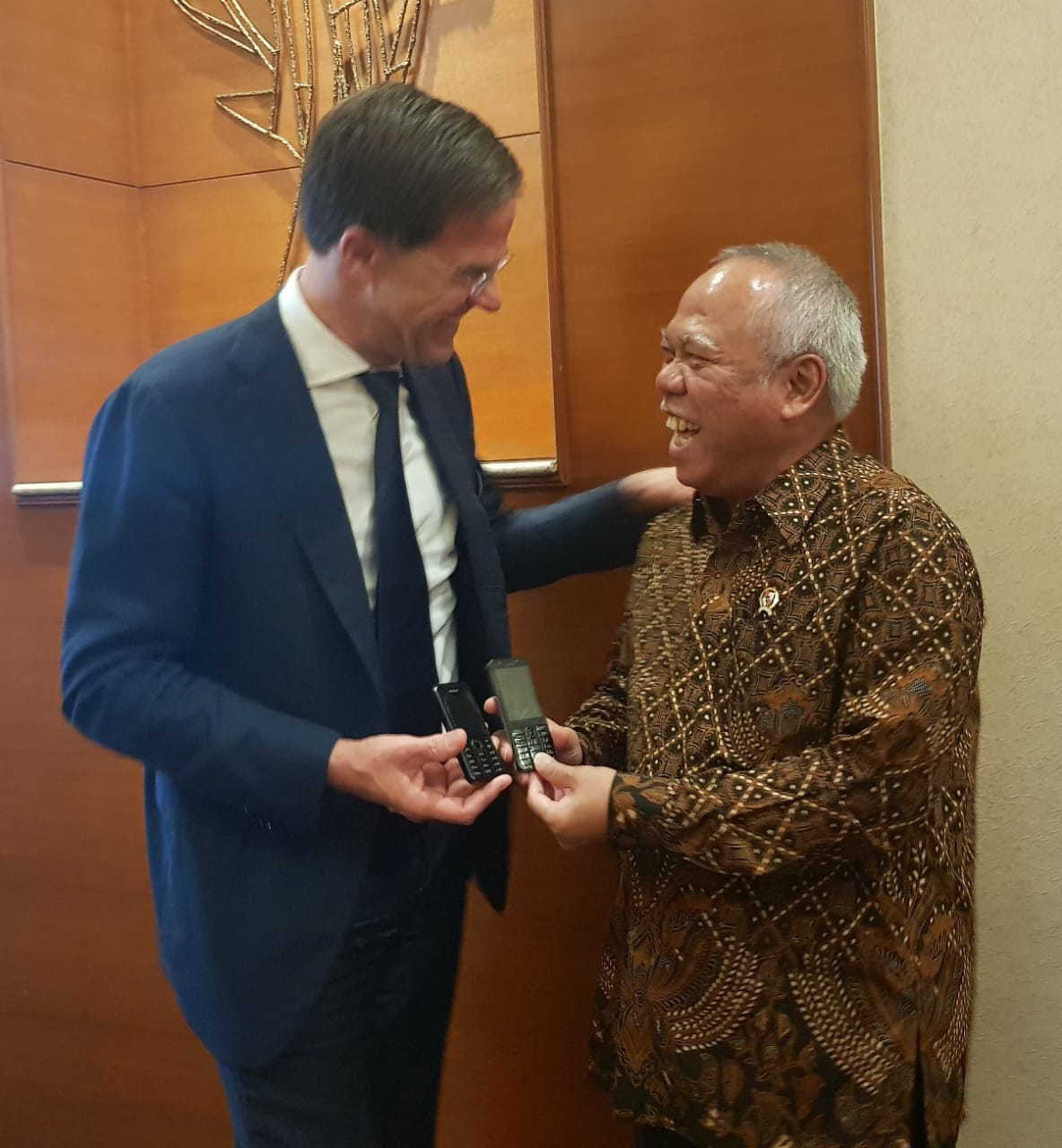
Basuki with Dutch Prime Minister Mark Rutte showing off their old Nokia phones in 2019.

On 26 October 2014, newly elected president Joko Widodo announced the appointment of Basuki as the minister of public works and public housing. The ministry was formed from a merger of the Ministry of Public Works and the Ministry of Public Housing, previously headed by Djoko Kirmanto and Djan Faridz respectively. Like other ministers, he resigned from his corporate work at Wijaya Karya upon appointment. He was one of the five Gadjah Mada University alumni in the cabinet lineup (excluding Widodo himself), and had a reported asset of Rp 6.5 billion (about US$ 500,000) in 2012.

Less than two months after becoming minister, Basuki agreed to provide a USD 62 million loan to compensate the victims of the Sidoarjo mud flow after getting in contact with the Bakrie Group. The company was given 4 years to pay off the debt, or face a government takeover of their assets (largely land). In 2016, he was also summoned by the Corruption Eradication Commission to serve as a witness regarding a graft case in his ministry.

In the first year under him the ministry received a IDR 33 trillion increase of funding between a draft and a revised budget plan – receiving the largest such increase compared to other ministries. While it only used about 8% of its IDR 118 trillion (USD 8.94 billion) annual budget within the first five months, by the end of that year the number increased to 94.5%. The ministry received the most funding compared to other ministries in 2016, while in the 2017 and 2018 budgets the ministry was second behind the Ministry of Defence. The ministry's budget for the 2018 fiscal year was set at IDR 107.3 trillion.

Basuki retained his ministerial position in the 2019 Onward Indonesia Cabinet. In 2022, he joined the Indonesian Democratic Party of Struggle (PDIP), the government's largest party and the then party of President Joko Widodo.

=== Projects ===
==== Moving the capital ====
In 2017, the People's Representative Council revoked funding for capital-moving studies in the ministry's budget. Basuki described the capital's possible future movement from Jakarta as a "political decision", and that the move "is not easy" with the ministry only having done literature studies instead of macro planning. He added that such a move might take four to five years in preparation. People's Consultative Assembly speaker Zulkifli Hasan has called for a delay in the move, citing its major cost amidst major infrastructure projects. Basuki also pointed out that Palangkaraya would not be the only option, if such a move was made.

On 3 June 2024, Basuki was appointed the acting head of the Nusantara Capital City Authority, the agency responsible for the development of the new capital, following the resignation of Bambang Susantono. Under Prabowo Subianto's presidency, Basuki was appointed the agency's definitive head on 5 November 2024.

==== Public housing ====
Joko Widodo launched a plan to construct 1 million public houses as part of 10 million affordable housing by 2019–of which about 600,000 will be constructed from the ministry's budget. In implementation, the program received various complaints regarding the project speed to the slow response of permits from local governments. According to Basuki, about 700,000 of the houses had been completed by October 2017.

==== Infrastructure ====
In the 2016 ministry budget, construction of roads and bridges received the largest share followed by water resources. The Indonesian government set plans to construct 1,000 km of toll roads within Widodo's first 5-year tenure alongside 2,650 km of national roads. This included completion of the Trans-Java Toll Road and the initiation of the Trans-Sumatra Toll Road, in addition to the Trans Papua road–which according to Basuki was planned to reach 4,300 km in length by 2019. A toll road was also initiated between the cities of Manado and Bitung in North Sulawesi.

The ministry also planned on constructing 49 dams to provide water resources between 2014 and 2019.

== Awards ==
For his 30 years of service in the Ministry of Public Works, Basuki was awarded the three Satyalencana Karya medals. He was also awarded the Satyalencana Pembangunan and Satyalencana Wirakarya medal in 2003 and 2005 respectively, in addition to Satyalencana Kesejahteraan Sosial for his work in Aceh following the tsunami. In December 2017, he also received the Bintang Bhayangkara Utama alongside 6 other cabinet ministers.

He also received a Distinguished Honorary Fellow award from the ASEAN Federation of Engineering Organizations in February 2017, along with an International Lifetime Contribution Award from the Japan Society of Civil Engineers in July 2017.

He also received The Order of the Rising Sun, Gold and Silver Star from Japan in November 2023.

- Indonesia:
  - Star of Mahaputera, 2nd Class (Indonesian: Bintang Mahaputera Adipradana) (2019)
  - Star of Bhayangkara, 1st Class (Indonesian: Bintang Bhayangkara Utama) (2017)
  - Civil Servants' Long Service Medal, (Indonesian: Satyalancana Karya Satya) (30 Years) (2014)
  - Civil Servants' Long Service Medal, (Indonesian: Satyalancana Karya Satya) (20 Years) (2003)
  - Civil Servants' Long Service Medal, (Indonesian: Satyalancana Karya Satya) (10 Years) (2001)
  - Medal for Contributing in the National Development, (Indonesian: Satyalancana Pembangunan) (2003)
  - Medal for Providing an Example of Meritorious Personality, (Indonesian: Satyalancana Wira Karya) (2005)
  - Medal for Service in the Field of Social Welfare, (Indonesian: Satyalancana Kebaktian Sosial) (2005)
- Japan:
  - Order of the Rising Sun, Gold and Silver Star (8 November 2023)
