= Bambang Susantono =

Indonesian politician (born 1963)

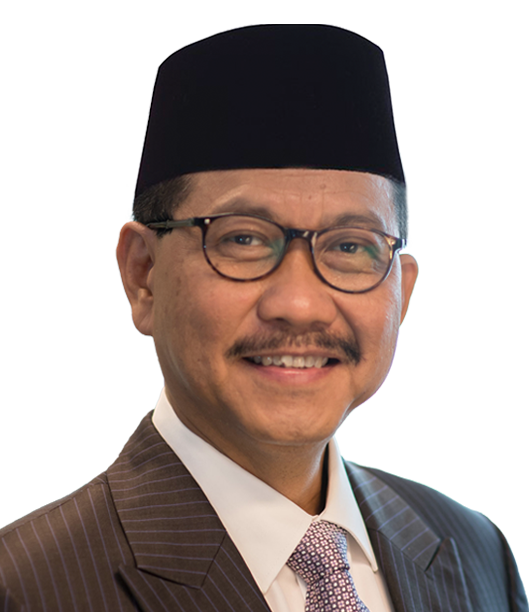
- Bambang in 2022

1st Head of Nusantara Capital City Authority
- In office 10 March 2022 – 3 June 2024
- Deputy: Dhony Rahajoe
- Preceded by: Office created
- Succeeded by: Basuki Hadimuljono

Minister of Transportation Acting
- In office 1 October 2014 – 20 October 2014
- President: Susilo Bambang Yudhoyono
- Preceded by: E.E. Mangindaan
- Succeeded by: Ignasius Jonan

Deputy Minister of Transportation
- In office 11 November 2009 – 20 October 2014
- Preceded by: A. S. de. Rozari (as Junior Minister of Transportation)
- Succeeded by: Suntana

Personal details
- Born: 4 November 1963 (age 62) Yogyakarta, Indonesia
- Party: Independent
- Spouse: Lusie Indrawati Susantono
- Children: 2
- Education: Bandung Institute of Technology; University of California, Berkeley
- Profession: Engineer, economist

Bambang Susantono (born 4 November 1963) is an Indonesian bureaucrat, who currently serves as Republic of Indonesia Presidential Special Envoy for the International Cooperation of the Nusantara Capital Development. He was the Head of Nusantara Capital City Authority from 10 March 2022 until his resignation on 3 June 2024. He is a civil engineer by profession and economist. He was a vice minister of Ministry of Transportation and later become acting Minister of Transportation served under Susilo Bambang Yudhoyono's second administration.

== Early life and education ==
Bambang was born on 4 November 1963 in Yogyakarta. He completed his undergraduate degree in civil engineering from the Bandung Institute of Technology in 1987. He later obtained scholarship to continue his studies at the University of California, Berkeley, where he obtained his master's degree in City and Regional Planning in 1996, master's degree in Transportation Engineering in 1998, and PhD degree in Infrastructure Planning in 2000.

== Careers ==
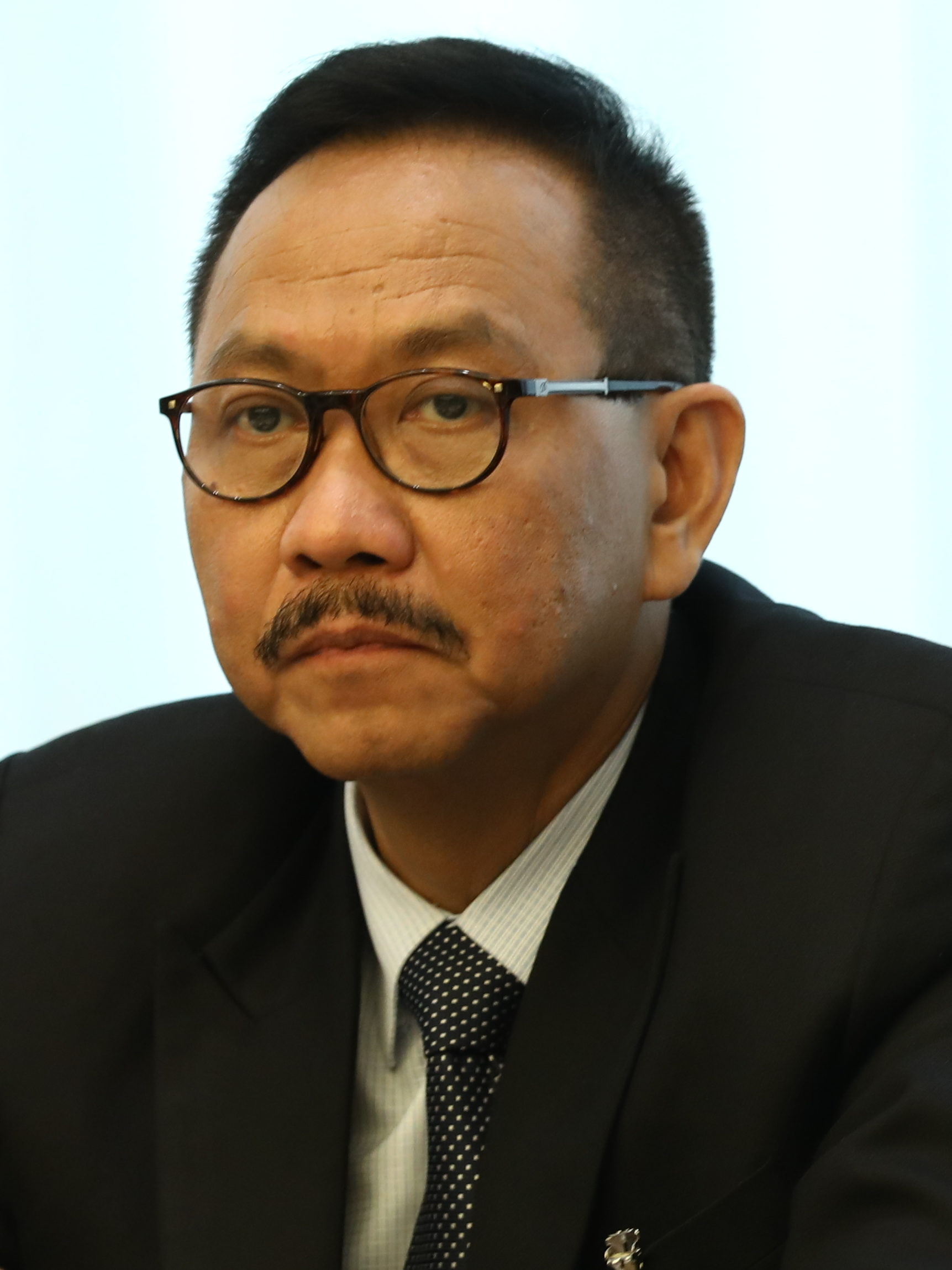
Bambang Susantono in 2019

After graduation from Bandung Institute of Technology, Bambang joined Department of Public Works (now Ministry of Public Works and Housing). He worked as government officers here until finally was transferred to Coordinating Ministry of Economical Affairs. The highest position as government officer he attained was Deputy of Infrastructure Coordination and Area Development of the Coordinating Ministry of Economical Affairs which achieved in 2010.

He also an educator. He had been become a visiting professor of Faculty of Engineering University of Indonesia and Land Transportation College (now Indonesian Land Transportation Polytechnic).

He was appointed as Deputy Minister of Transportation on 11 November 2009 by Susilo Bambang Yudhoyono through Presidential Decision No. 111/N/2009, although the appointment with other deputy ministers quite controversial as he and many of early deputy ministers were government employee in service. His appointment as deputy minister of transportation was the first after the post was last occupied by A.S. de Rozari in 1957 and the post is dormant since then. He was inaugurated as deputy minister on 6 January 2010 until 1 October 2014. He briefly become acting minister of transportation from 1 October 2014 to 20 October 2014, when Ernest Evert Mangindaan, the minister of transportation resigned after being succeeded to be a congressman following 2014 Indonesian legislative election. He was Minister of Transportation in charge before transferred the power to Ignasius Jonan.

After no longer in ministry, Bambang moved to Philippines, sitting as vice president for Knowledge Management and Sustainable Development of the Asian Development Bank.

== Chairman of Nusantara Capital City Authority ==
There was report that Joko Widodo favored Bambang to become Head of Nusantara Capital City Authority over a list of politicians and figures after an unnamed government official leaked it to the press. However, Executive Office of the President of the Republic of Indonesia always deflected the information. It later confirmed that Joko Widodo choice is true. He is expected to appoint Bambang as Head on 10 March 2022.

On 9 December 2023, Bambang was awarded honorary professorship from Diponegoro University.

On 3 June 2024, Bambang resigned as head of authority. President Joko Widodo appointed public works minister Basuki Hadimuljono as acting head.

== Post-Chairman of Nusantara Capital City Authority ==
After no longer in Nusantara Capital City Authority, he joined as faculty of Department of Urban Planning, Faculty of Engineering, Diponegoro University.

Despite no longer in the Authority, he still strongly connected with the Authority. On 11 June 2024, Bambang appointed as Presidential Envoy for International Cooperation of Nusantara Development, worked directly under the President to promote Nusantara development and partnership internationally.

== Personal life ==
Bambang is married to Lusie Indrawati, a lawyer and former Secretary General of Indonesian Diaspora Network (IDN) Global 2021-2023. Together, they had two daughters: Buya and Dian Nisa.

Bambang is a Muslim.
