= SD Negeri 020 Sepaku =

Coordinates: 0.9520°S 116.7401°E

State Primary School 020 Sepaku
- Sekolah Dasar Negeri 020 Sepaku
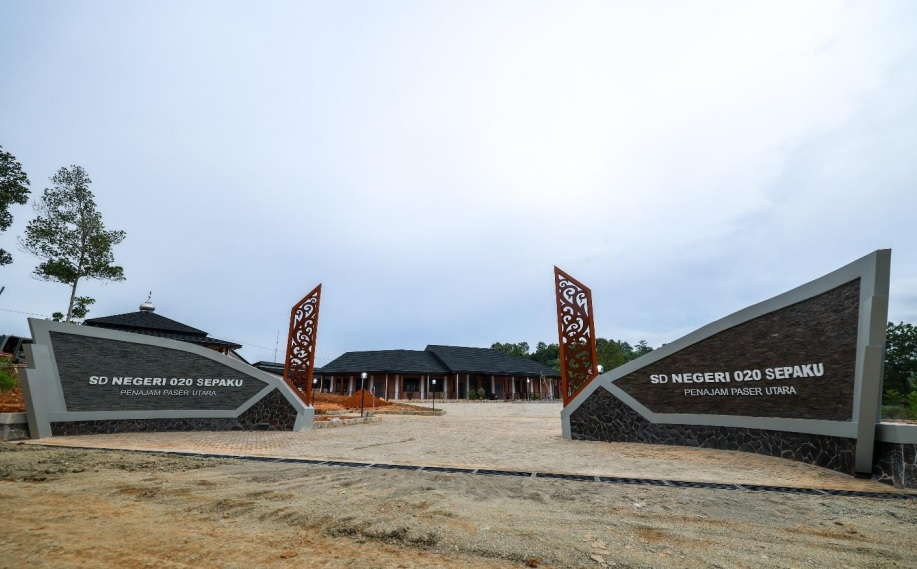
- Gate of the school
- Sepaku, Penajam North Paser, East Kalimantan; Indonesia

Information
- Type: Public
- Established: 1 July 1987
- Authority: Education, Youth, and Sports Service of Penajam North Paser
- Principal: Pujianto
- Staff: 19 (2025)
- Enrollment: 315 (2025)
- Accreditation: A

State Primary School 020 Sepaku (Indonesian: Sekolah Dasar Negeri 020 Sepaku or SDN 020 Sepaku; National School Identification Number: 30402023) is a public primary school in Bumi Harapan, Sepaku, Penajam North Paser Regency, East Kalimantan, Indonesia. Established in 1987, it serves over 300 students and holds an "A" accreditation. In 2025, the school relocated to a new campus, was designated as a model school for Nusantara's education roadmap, and was re-inaugurated in June of that year.

== History ==
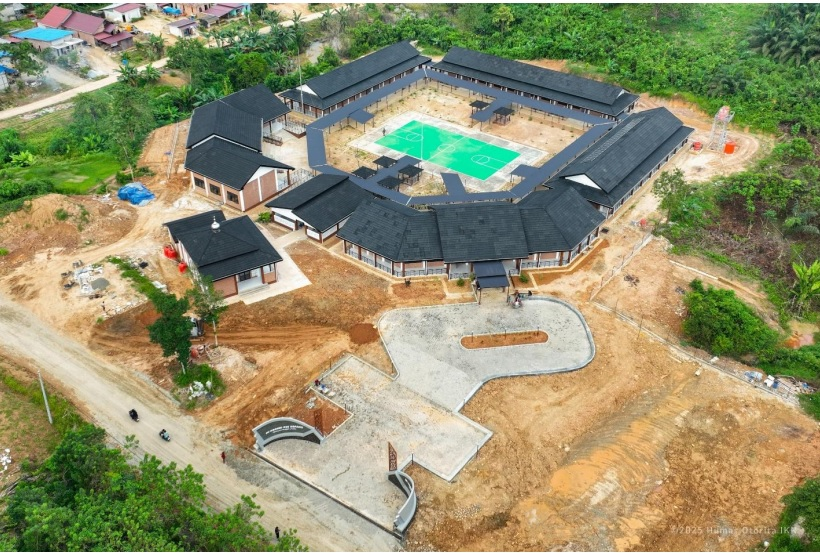
Current building (as of 2025)

SDN 020 Sepaku was founded on 1 July 1987 through decree 001/SDN-067//07/1987, whilst being originally part of Balikpapan (Balikpapan Seberang, later Penajam). It was originally located at 45th kilometre of Samboja–Petung Provincial Road, in the village of Bumi Harapan, and the school received its operational permit on 15 January 2016. However, its original location has been considered prone to floods during rainy season, due to being located next to a river. In August 2024, the schoolchildren had been affected by dust from the construction of Nusantara, the future capital city of Indonesia, reportedly causing various diseases such as coughing, runny nose, fever, and diarrhoea. There were also complaints of noise during the construction.

On 20 June 2023, Opera Gema Tanah Air Nusantara, created by M. Syabir and played by more than 150 people, including students and teachers, was held at the field of SDN 020 Sepaku. On 1 November 2023, then-president Joko Widodo, together with Nadiem Makarim, Basuki Hadimuljono, Erick Thohir, Bambang Susantono, Akmal Malik, Tiffani Boer, and Gunawan Salim, attended the ground breaking for the revitalisation of SDN 020 Sepaku. Nusantara Capital City Authority (OIKN) then selected the school, alongside seven others in Sepaku, as role models for the implementation of educational roadmap in Nusantara. Jokowi also promised that the revitalisation project for SDN 020 Sepaku would be completed within 10 months. The decision to revitalise the school was welcomed by parents of its students.

The new building was constructed by Astra Educational Foundation – Michael D. Ruslim (YPA MDR) with a budget of Rp 29 billion on a 2-hectare land granted by the government of Bumi Harapan. The building also adopts aspects of traditional Dayak architecture (lamin house), with the concepts of 'smart building' and 'green building'. The chairman of YPA MDR, Gunawan Salim, inaugurated the building on 26 February 2025, and the event was also attended by deputy of Social-Cultural and Societal Empowerment Sector of OIKN, Alimuddin; head of Education, Youth, and Sports Service of PPU, Andi Singkerru; and several other local figures. Since then, the school has relocated its activities into the new location. These relocation efforts were appreciated by the Regional House of Representatives (DPRD) of Penajam North Paser.

On 13 June 2025, SDN 020 Sepaku was inaugurated for the second time, attended by chairman of Nusantara Capital City Authority, Basuki Hadimuljono, minister of primary and secondary education, Abdul Mu'ti, speaker of the Commission X at DPR, Hetifah Sjaifudian, and vice regent of Penajam North Paser, Waris Muin. During his visit, Mu'ti also requested to the school to include interactive smart boards in every classroom.

== Facilities ==
As of 2025, SDN 020 Sepaku consists of 12 classrooms, a computer laboratorium, teachers' room(s), a principal's room, a health unit, a cooperative, a canteen, a prayer room, and other supporting facilities.
