= Balik people =

Ethnic group in Indonesia

Balik
Paser Balik

Total population
- ±1,000 (2023)

Regions with significant populations
- East Kalimantan (Penajam North Paser and Balikpapan)

Languages
- Paser (Balik dialect), Kutainese, and Indonesian

Religion
- Islam

Related ethnic groups
- Paser • Kutai • Benuaq • Basap

The Balik people (Indonesian: Orang Balik) is an ethnic group that inhabits Sepaku in Penajam North Paser and Balikpapan in the province of East Kalimantan, Indonesia. The Balik people is considered to be one of the subgroups of the Paser people (or a Dayak subgroup), although according to Sibukdin, the Balik traditional leader, the Balik people is not part of the Paser people and is a distinct ethnicity.

The name of Balikpapan is believed to be taken from the name of this ethnic group, namely the word balik, and the word papan 'boards'. The Balik people were previously known as a supplier of boards for the Sultanate of Kutai Kertanegara. Currently, the Balik people is a minority in both Balikpapan and Penajam North Paser. In Penajam North Paser, precisely in Sepaku district, the number is no more than 1,000 people or 200 families in 2023, spread across three villages, namely in Bumi Harapan, Sepaku, and Pemaluan.

The Balik customary territory is also included within the development project of Nusantara, the future capital city of Indonesia from outgoing Jakarta. In this project, hundreds of houses of the Balik people are threatened with relocation due to the Sepaku River flood management project. Meanwhile, according to then Governor of East Kalimantan, Isran Noor, there were no indigenous people in this area, because it was originally a natural forest and later changed into a production forest. Along with the development, new residents began to come to occupy the area, including transmigrants.

== History ==
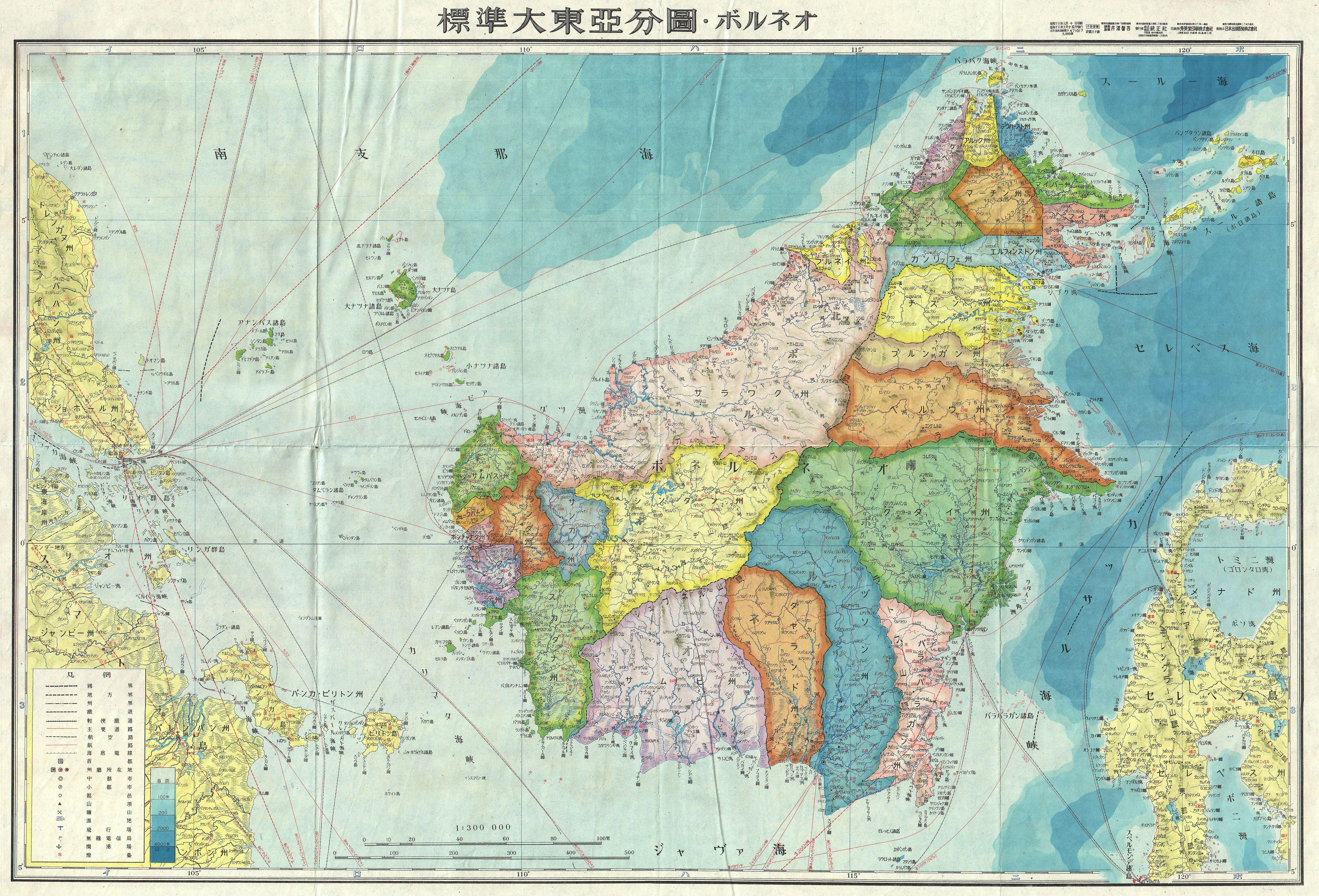
Map of occupied Borneo in 1943 by imperial Japan in World War II, with labels written in Japanese characters, while Balik settlements were included within the Kutainese region.

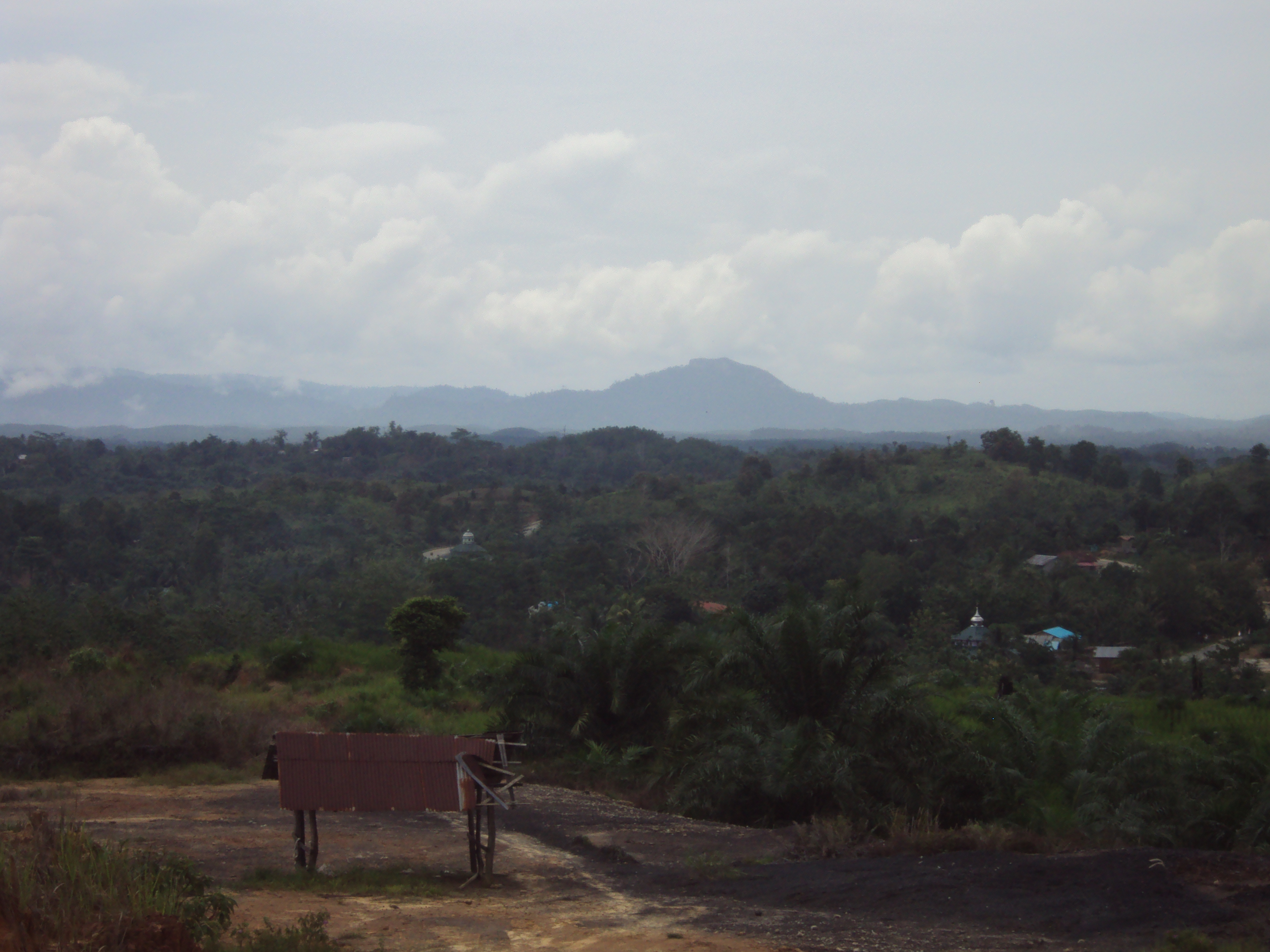
Mount Parung became the border between the territories of Balik people and much larger community of Kutainese people.

In the 18th century, Balik people devoted themselves to the Kingdom of Kutai Kertanegara and the Sultanate of Paser. According to Sibukdin, "at the time, there had been borders inhabited by Balik people with other ethnicities." Balik-inhabited territories shared borders with Kutainese people at the Mount Parung and Paser people at the Tunan River. The region was once a wedding gift by the Sultan of Paser for his princess who married with a Kutainese nobleman.

According to their traditional legend, the Balik people were descended from Tuma Tuo, who went into the edge of the sky (tondal langit), together with other eight people including Kakah Ukop, and each of them rode junks. Their intentions were to meditate and to search a king for the Balik people. Before returning from the sky, he received several gifts, including 8 packs of pepes (blingkis). It is believed that if the largest blingkis were opened in one region, then that region will become a crowded place or a city, and if the smallest blingkis were opened in one region, then it would only become a village. Another legend claims that the Balik were descended from ancestors Kayun Kuleng and Papan Ayun.

In 1920, the Balik community suffered an epidemic (delanan), causing its population to decline, and prompted some of them to emigrate to Samarinda. It was attributed to a mistake in giving offerings from other ethnic groups, and also offering porks during a ritual, causing anger from their ancestors. In 1942, a battle had just occurred in Balik traditional regions within Balikpapan. At the time, the Balik people lived at its coasts, once under the rule of Sultanate of Kutai Kartanegara (led by Sultan Aji Muhammad Sulaiman). They later escaped into the forests, which became the last frontier of their traditional region, located in Sepaku. During Japanese occupation, Balik people began to settle in the region, although some claim this happened much earlier during Dutch colonial era.

In 1970s, the Indonesian government initiated a transmigration program from Java into sparsely inhabited regions outside the island, the Sepaku-Semoi region is among them. Each transmigrant was allocated a one-hectare plot of land, included with legalities from the government. Along with the arrival of transmigrants, industrial forest and palm oil companies also came to arrive in Sepaku. Lands owned by the Balik people began to be sold. At that time, they did not understand the importance of land legalities. Their fields can be sold at low prices, according to needs. This caused them to slowly lose their lands.

== Culture ==
=== Language ===
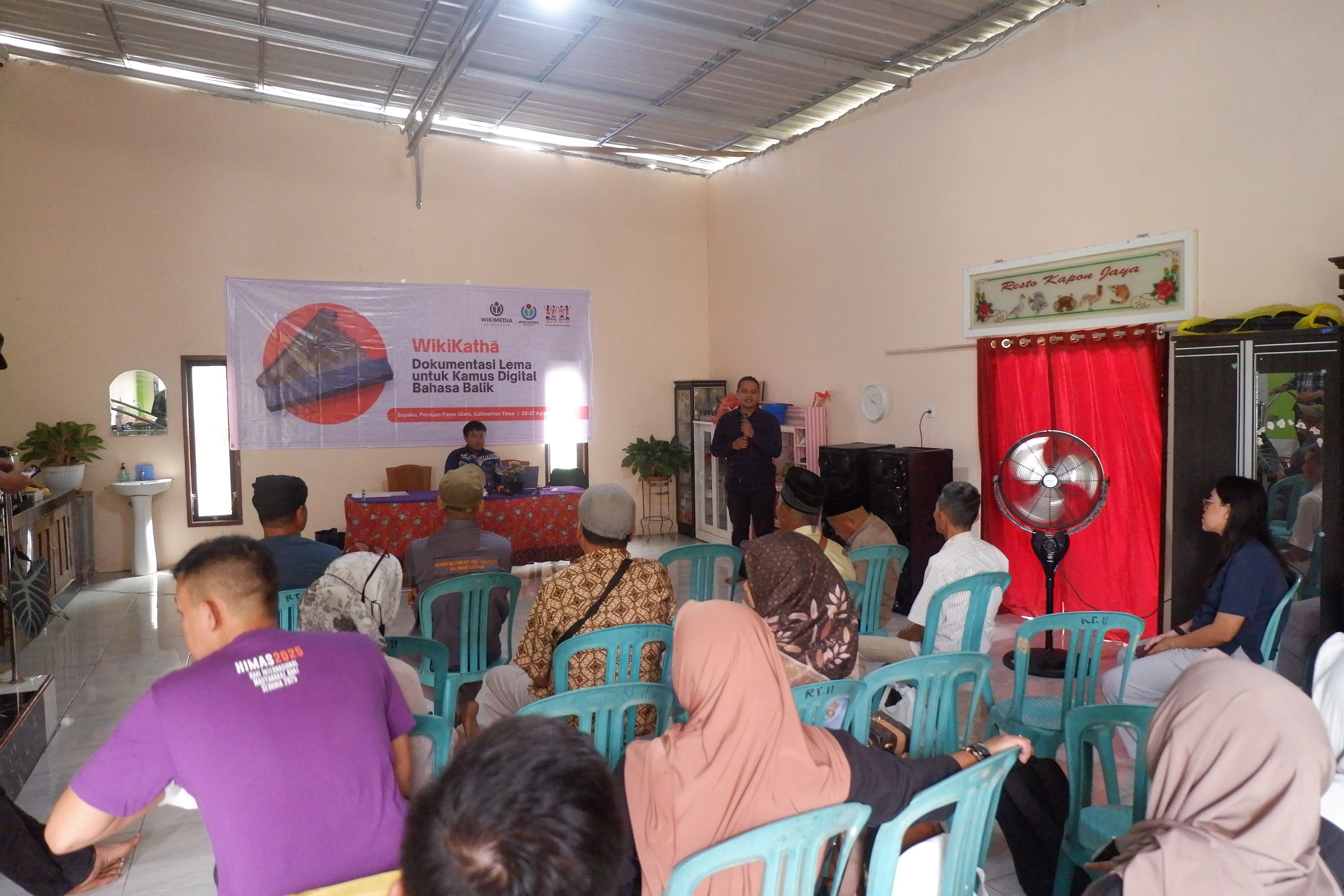
WikiKathā training on the preservation of Balik language, 2025.

Surprisingly, there are little traces of indigenous culture in Sepaku due to the arrivals of immigrant ethnic groups, including in linguistic aspects. The Balik language (closely related to, or a dialect of Paser, from the Northeast Barito stock) has been spoken by only 5 elderly speakers (from all 2,000 Balik people), namely Sibukdin, Sekion, Rimba, Atim, and Bunga. There are several lexical differences from Paser proper: prenggi is used in Balik instead of kedang to refer the papaya, and pontor instead of petak for the airbreathing catfish.

The Balik language has been displaced by Indonesian as well as other immigrant languages, such as Javanese, of which they also well-spersed in. In order to preserve their language, between 2023 and 2024, the Alliance of Nusantara Traditional Societies (AMAN) of East Kalimantan has documented thousands of Balik words on Mini Ensiklopedia Masyarakat Suku Balik.

=== Lifestyle ===
In the past, the Balik people lived in forests, and there are five caves that were used for their livelihoods: Tembinus, Bekayas, Belatat, Parung, and Liang Tulus caves. In these caves, Balik people took nests of black wallets, to be traded for rice. Vegetables were also unknown to the Balik people, since all vegetables are wild plants in the forests. They also hunted muntjacs (payau in their dialect), deer, and rabbits for meat.

=== Belian ===
The ritual of belian or belian bawo, is one of the traditional rituals of the Balik people, this one is different to another version of belian as practiced by the Paser people. What is different from the latter ritual, is the inclusion of tongue cutting in Balik belian. However, this ritual becomes almost extinct due to being contrary with Islamic teachings. During this procession, a cut tongue is interpreted as a sign that 'a person from above' (spirit) has arrived. But after the ritual, the tongue will return to normal.

=== Ronggeng ===
Ronggeng or Ronggeng Balik is a traditional dance as staged by Balik women. Currently, many of the Ronggeng Balik only features the dance as staged by 7 woman dancers, accompanied by kendang and gambus music. But in fact, Ronggeng Balik also features dancers speaking in the Balik language.

In the past, Ronggeng was used as a healing ritual for sick people. Elders of the Balik community would lead prayers and give traditional herbal medicine. With seven woman dancers. Balik people believed that the series of processions would help the healing by involving ancestor spirits.

During the staging of Ronggeng Balik, the dancers would often invites the audience to dance on stage. By the means the scarf used by the dancers is put around the audience's neck, and then led into the stage. Not just that, the audience is invited to reciprocate pantun by the dancers.

This is a sample of Balik-language pantun as used by Ronggeng Balik dancer, with the English translation in the right:

Erai babun ke duo babun
Babun ku ido do atok bias
Erai pantun ke duo pantun
Pantun ku ido maning benales

One basket or two basket
My basket is full of rice
One pantun or two pantun
My pantun needs to be replied

The audience that invited to dance, is required to reciprocate the pantun until the dance finishes. Although being simple, at least, it can be used to preserve the Balik language.

== See also ==
- Ethnic groups in Indonesia
- Native Indonesians
- Kutai people
