= 2019 Penajam riots =

The 2019 Penajam riots were an incident that occurred on 16 October 2019 when a group of people burned down houses and public facilities in the town of Penajam, Penajam North Paser Regency, East Kalimantan.

== Background ==
The riot originated from an assault and stabbing case at Nipah-Nipah Beach. Chandra, a student from SMK Pelita Gamma, was killed during the incident, while his friend Rian was injured and received treatment at Ratu Aji Putri Botung Regional Public Hospital. The perpetrator was arrested at Balikpapan by the local police. Then-regent of Penajam North Paser, Abdul Gafur Masud, connected the riots with the establishment of Nusantara, the future capital city of Indonesia, and alleged that the riots were as a result of provocation.

== Damage ==
The National Agency for Disaster Countermeasure (BNPB) recorded that 144 houses, 1 educational facility, and 10 kiosks/stalls were burned down due to the riots. Material losses due to the riots reached IDR 7.3 billion, including damage and housing losses of IDR 5.3 billion, social-education losses of Rp1.6 billion, and trade losses of Rp335 million.

== Aftermath ==
The Regent of Penajam North Paser (PPU) Abdul Gafur Mas'ud together with a number of Dayak and Paser traditional figures conducted mediation efforts on 17 October 2019. Mediation was carried out after riots erupted by local ethnic groups.

After the riots, mediation efforts were carried out by the government together with local community leaders. From the mediation, two points of agreement emerged. First, the Paser indigenous community will hold a customary trial attended by important Dayak customary figures internally without the involvement of law enforcement officers. Second, all participants agreed to calm the anger of the Paser indigenous community in the Paser Regency, especially Long Kali, so that they do not take actions that could disrupt security stability and harm the wider community.

On 30 October 2019, a monument was erected in the Pesisir Pantai Nipah-Nipah Road area with the name Ori Tendang, which translates to a 'single pole' in the Paser language. This monument was made from ironwood and was erected under Paser traditional ritual activity to commemorate the deaths of victims.

Three months later, on 29 January 2020, the Ori Tendang monument was cut down and burned by the victim's parents. The reason behind the destruction of the monument was because the victim's parents still felt the pain of losing their child every time they saw this monument. The local police worked together with the TNI to approach other audiences so that the incident would not lead to misinformation and disinformation.
