= TWY =

TWY, or twy, may refer to:

- Taxiway
- The Wonder Years, an American television comedy-drama
- TWY, the IATA code for Tawa Airport in Papua New Guinea
- twy, the ISO 639-3 code for the Lawangan language spoken in Indonesia
- TWY, the National Rail code for Twyford railway station in the county of Berkshire, UK
- The Wonder Years, an American rock band
