= Paser language =

Paser
- Pasir
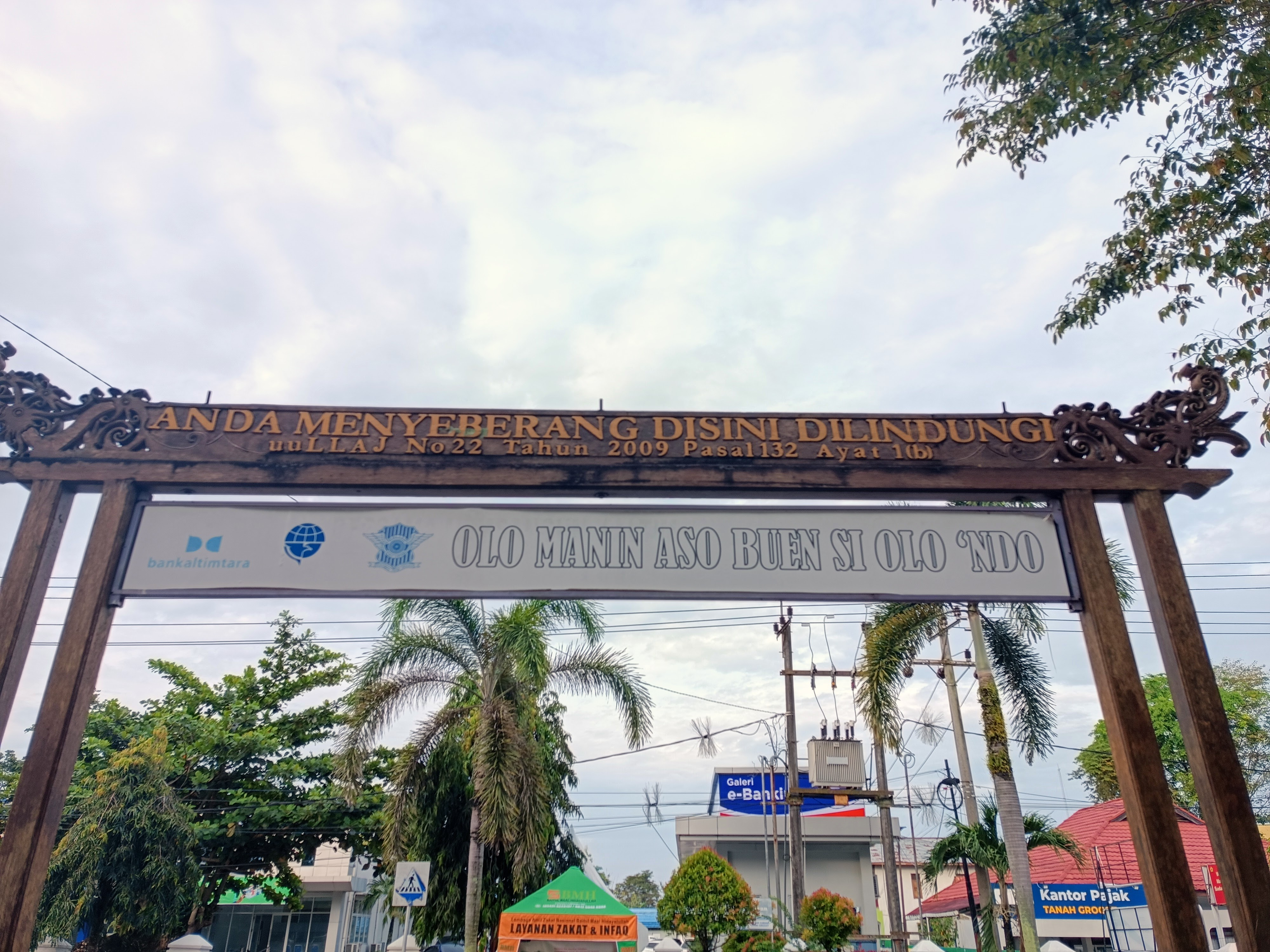
- Usage of the Paser language on a pedestrian crossing
- Native to: Indonesia
- Region: East Kalimantan
- Ethnicity: Paser people
- Native speakers: 200,000 (2022)
- Language family: Austronesian: Malayo-Polynesian; East Barito; Northeast Barito; Lawangan; Paser
- Writing system: Latin; Arabic (Jawi script)

Language codes
- ISO 639-3: –
- Glottolog: pasi1257

Paser (previously known as Pasir before 2007) is an Austronesian isolect, either a dialect of or a language closely related to Lawangan, traditionally spoken by the Paser people, who are culturally distinct from other Dayaks. Majority of the speakers reside in modern-day Paser and Penajam North Paser regencies of East Kalimantan, but a small number of them are in Balikpapan and Kotabaru.

Unlike most other Dayak subgroups, the Paser people have long adopted Islam as the majority religion, while also being influenced by the Malay culture. Paser previously had never seen attention by foreign linguists including Alfred B. Hudson, until the publication of a local grammar book titled Bahasa Pasir in 1979. Unlike Lawangan and Taboyan, this language currently does not have its own ISO 639-3 code.

== Classification ==
Alexander Smith in 2018 grouped the Paser language, together with Lawangan, Taboyan, Benuaq, and Bentian, as part of the Northeast Barito languages branch. Some of sound changes include the merger of mid central vowel *ə and final -a into o, change of Proto-Malayo-Polynesian *ʀ into y (PMP *kaʀəm → Paser kayom), and the rhotacism of *d/*j into *r (*quləj → ulor). He additionally clarified during the 27th meeting of Southeast Asian Linguistics Association, that the so-called Barito languages are a linkage instead of a proper branch.

=== Dialects ===
Darmansyah et al. 1979 initially named 17 dialects of the Paser language, additionally also claiming that its speakers could understand Maanyan as well (the dialect group names are named after existing Dayak subgroups in Central Kalimantan):

Dialect group	Dialect	Location
Olo Ot Danum	Peteban	Pasir Belengkong
Olo Ot Danum	Pembesi (Laburan)	Pasir Belengkong
Olo Ot Danum	Pematang	Pasir Belengkong
Olo Ot Danum	Adang	Long Ikis
Olo Ot Danum	Telake	Long Kali
Olo Ot Danum	Luangan	Muara Komam
Olo Ot Danum	Tajur	Long Ikis
Olo Ot Danum	Pemukan	Batu Besar (Note: Presumably referring to the Gunung Batu Besar village in the district of Sampanahan, Kotabaru Regency.)
Olo Ot Danum	Balik	Balikpapan (Note: Large portions of its territories became part of Pasir Regency following annexations of 1987, and these areas are nowadays known as Penajam and Sepaku inside Penajam North Paser.)
Olo Ot Danum	Bajau	Kendilo estuary
Olo Ot Ngaju	Saing Pusat	Batu Kajang
Olo Ot Ngaju	Migi	Long Ikis
Olo Ot Ngaju	Semuntai	Long Ikis
Olo Ot Ngaju	Buramato	Batu Sopang
Olo Ot Ngaju	Saing Bewai	Pasir Belengkong
Olo Ot Ngaju	Bukit	Tanjung Aru (Note: This district was split into Tanjung Harapan and Batu Engau on an unknown date (presumably few years after the fall of Suharto).)
Olo Ot Ngaju	Puti Baka	Long Ikis

The following shows vocabulary differences between the Pematang, Telake, and Laburan dialects:

	Pematang	Telake	Laburan
I	aku		oki
what	iséq	eséq	eséq/iyét
why	kenoné	koé embé	ketoné
small	idik	rini	
friendly	samor	gawal	samor
limp	témpang		jeking
animal	korik		morik
chicken	piak		ayam
ape	kuyar	kodé	kodé/kuyar
flower	kembang	bungo	
sun	mato olo	mato lo	
daylight	molo	lo	

== Phonology ==
=== Consonants ===
Consonants
		Labial	Alveolar	Palatal	Velar	Glottal
Nasal		m	n	ɲ ⟨ny⟩	ŋ ⟨ng⟩	
Plosive	voiceless	p	t	tʃ ⟨c⟩	k	ʔ ⟨q⟩
Plosive	voiced	b	d	dʒ ⟨j⟩	ɡ ⟨g⟩	
Fricative			s			
Trill			r			
Lateral			l			
Approximant		w		j ⟨y⟩		

=== Vowels ===
Vowels
	Front	Central	Back
Close	i		u
Mid	ɛ ⟨é⟩	ə ⟨e⟩	o
Open		a	

Paser has five diphthongs, namely /aj/, /aw/, /oj/, /ow/, and /uj/. Additionally, vowels are pronounced long in final open syllables (but not in other environments including before final /ʔ/).

=== Stress ===
Paser words are non-distinctively stressed on the penultimate (second-to-last) syllables: olay "big", tindu "to beg, request".

== Literature ==
Unlike languages outside of Borneo, Paser did not have writing systems of their own. It only began to use the Jawi script after the Paser monarchy's adoption of Islam as their official religion. Old ritual prayers, folk stories, pantoums (pantun), and songs were transmitted orally. The Paser language has also been used during a traditional ceremony known as besoyong, a request for safety from the spirits. At the time of release of Bahasa Pasir in 1979, the only Paser-language works written in Latin script were the translations from four folk stories originally in Indonesian released between 1977 and 1978:

- "Pasir Natives Abstain from Eating White Buffalo Meat" (Ulun Asli Pasir Dian Kuman Isi Kerewau Bura)
- "Tiger of Segantang" (Macan Segantang)
- "Wedding of Princess Petung" (Pengenten Putri Petung)
- "Origin of the Pasir Regency's Name" (Pengulet Karan Kabupaten Pasir)
