= Sepaku Regional Public Hospital =

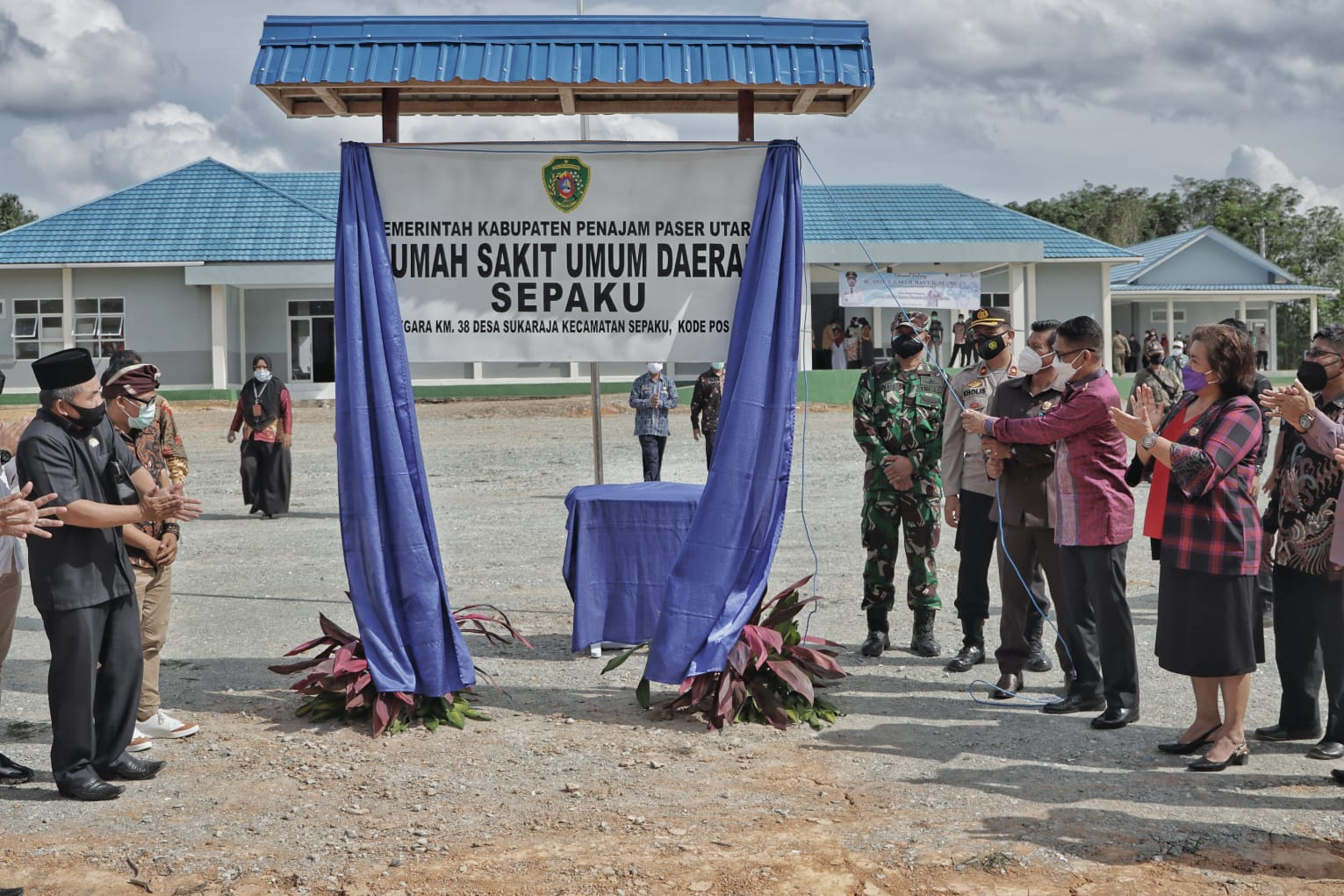

Geography
- Location: Samboja–Sepaku Road, Sukaraja, Sepaku, Penajam North Paser, East Kalimantan, Indonesia
- Coordinates: 0.911755°S 116.785641°E

Organisation
- Type: C

Services
- Beds: 33 beds (2021)

History
- Founded: August 5, 2021; 5 years ago

Links
- Lists: Hospitals in Indonesia

Sepaku Regional Public Hospital (Indonesian: Rumah Sakit Umum Daerah Sepaku or RSUD Sepaku) is the first public hospital at the village of Sukaraja, Sepaku, Penajam North Paser Regency, East Kalimantan, Indonesia.

When it was first established in 2021, RSUD Sepaku had the facilities of 23 adult beds and 10 children's beds, included with various supporting facilities and utilities, such as three-dimensional USG, incubator, laboratorium, et cetera. Ministry of Health gave facility improvisation aid for RSUD Sepaku through specially-allocated fund of around IDR 72 billion, along with the construction of future capital city Nusantara. The fund is also intended for the construction of four-floor building, so that it could be upgraded into type C hospital. This trauma centre facility can also be used for victims of work accidents, traffic accidents, and others.

== History ==
RSUD Sepaku was first inaugurated on 5 August 2021 by the regional secretary of PPU, Muliadi, and it began to provide health services on 10 January 2022. On 5 February 2025, Building C, which consists of 4 floors and numerous facilities inside, including intensive care units and inpatient rooms, was inaugurated by acting regent of PPU, Zainal Arifin, as well as other local officials. Its construction consumed the Specially Allocated Fund (DAK) of IDR 71.89 billion, and it was finished in late 2024. However, as of March 2025, this hospital was experiencing a shortage of medical specialists. Because of this, RSUD Sepaku has employed contract workers from nearby hospitals, such as RSUD Ratu Aji Putri Botung and RSUD Samboja.
