= Waru, Penajam North Paser =

Waru
- District
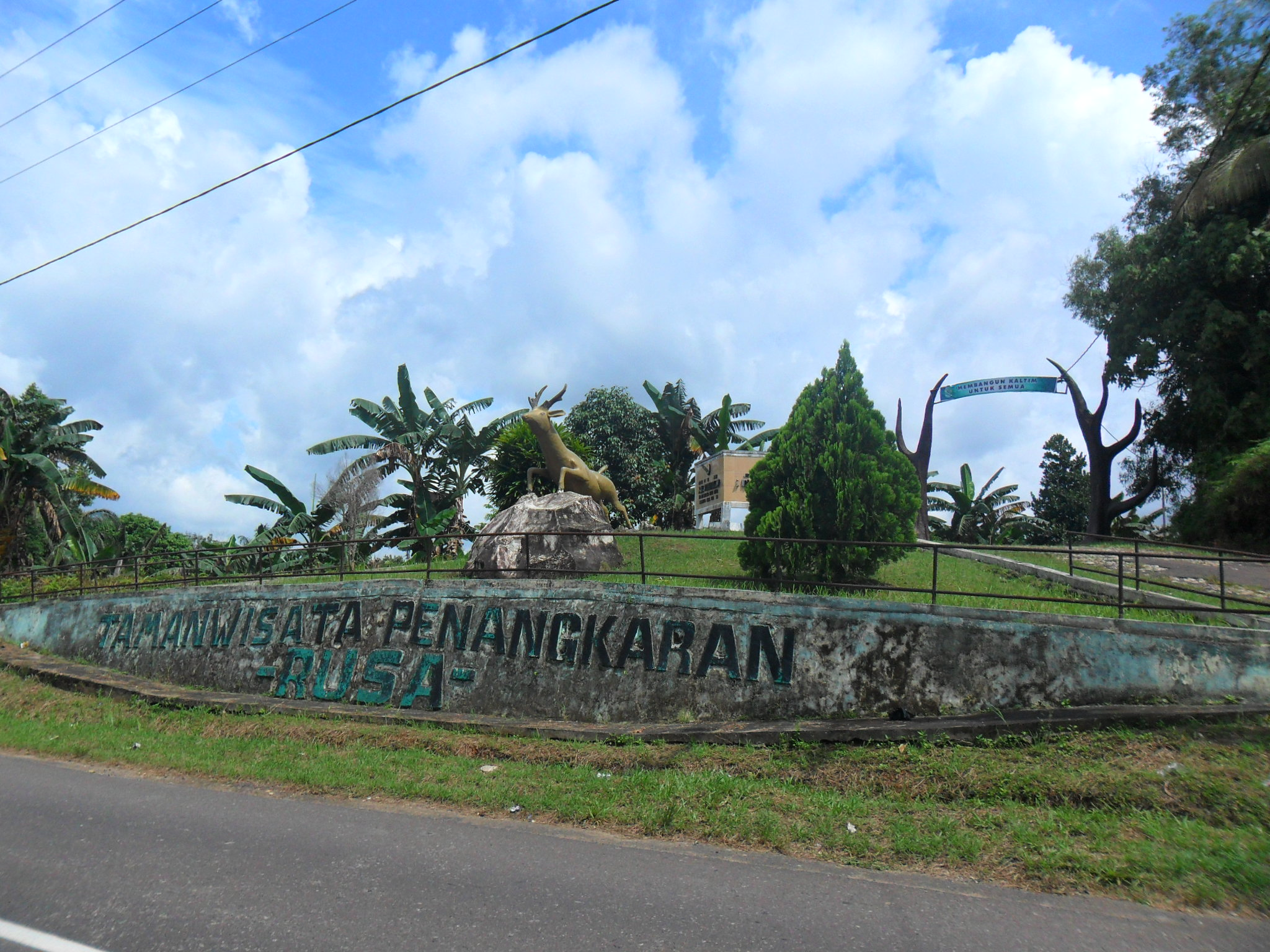
- Deer breeding park at Waru (2011)
- Interactive map of Waru
- Location Waru (Indonesia)
- Coordinates: 1°23′22.67704″S 116°37′10.14488″E
- Country: Indonesia
- Province: East Kalimantan
- Regency: Penajam North Paser
- District seat: Waru

Government
  - District head (Camat): Ahmad Yani

Area
  - Total: 553.38 km^{2} (213.66 sq mi)

Population (2023)
  - Total: 20,965
  - Density: 37.885/km^{2} (98.123/sq mi)
- Time zone: UTC+8 (ICT)
- Postal code: 76284
- Regional code: 69.09.02
- Villages: 4

Waru is a district of Penajam North Paser Regency, in East Kalimantan, Indonesia. As of 2023, it was inhabited by 20,965 people, and currently has a total area of 553.38 km^{2}. Its district seat is located at the village of Waru.

The district borders Penajam to the north, Babulu to the southwest, and Long Kali (Paser) to the west. It is also named after the tree Hibiscus tiliaceus (waru), for being abundant along what is now the Penajam–Babulu provincial road. Along with Babulu, this modern-day region originally belonged to Kotabaru of South Kalimantan until 1959, and remained as part of Pasir before joining the newly-formed regency of Penajam North Paser in 2002.

== Governance ==
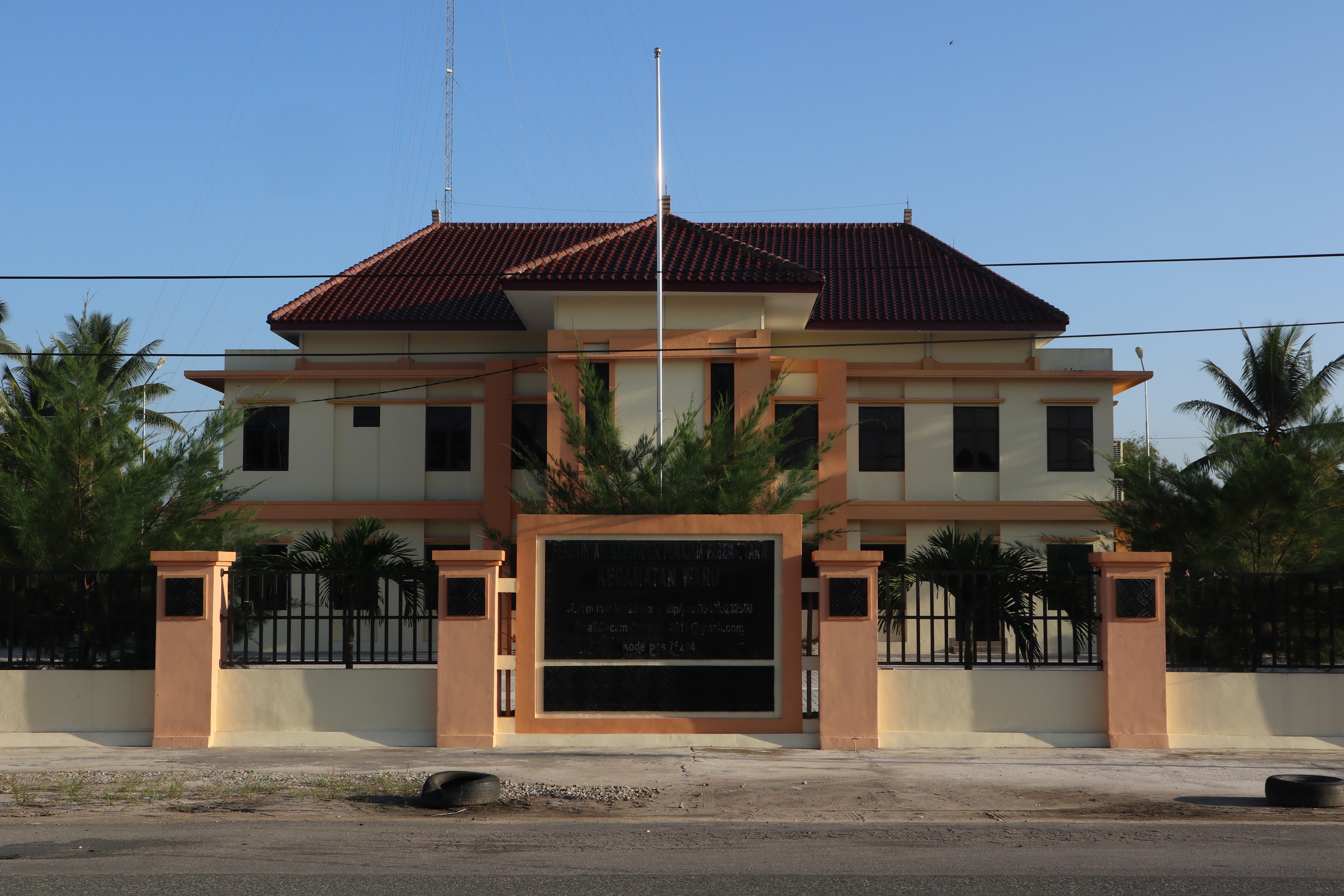
District head office at Waru, Waru.

Map of villages in Waru (after 2010)

=== Villages ===
Waru is divided into the following 4 villages (the rest are rural desa, urban kelurahan is marked by grey background):

Regional code (Kode wilayah)	Name	Area (km^{2})	Population (2023)	RT (rukun tetangga)
64.09.02.2001	Api-Api	17.70	2,441	9
64.09.02.2002	Sesulu	31.00	3,985	11
64.09.02.1003	Waru	167.26	9,776	30
64.09.02.2004	Bangun Mulya	29.01	4,763	18
	Totals	553.38	20,965	68

The village of Bangun Mulya was split from Waru on 14 April 2010.

== Places of interest ==
=== Deer breeding park ===
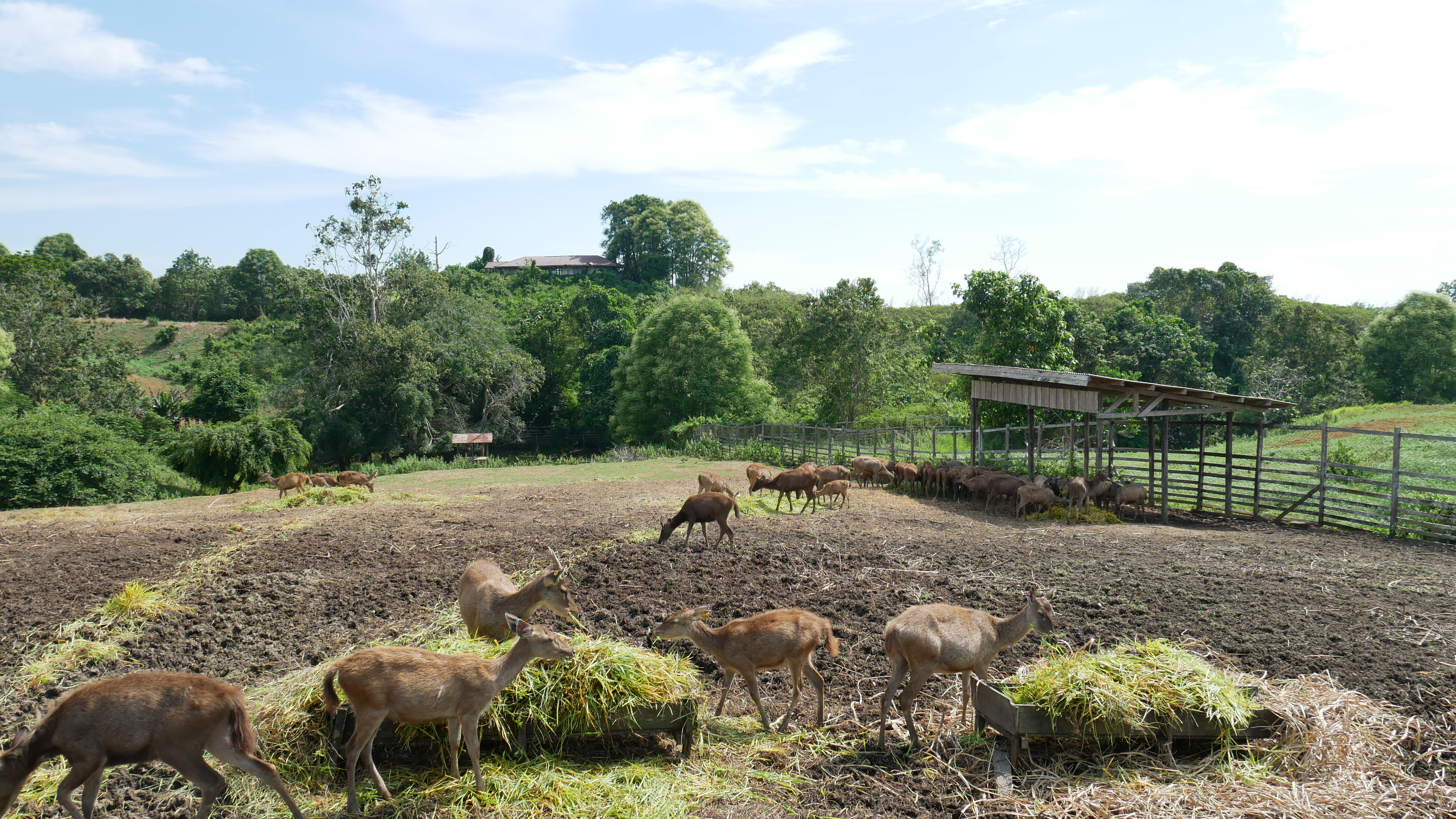
Inside look of the park

Located on the 32nd kilometer of State Road, at the village of Api-Api, Waru, this sambar deer breeding park was established in 1991 with only 80 individuals. Nowadays, this number has increased up to 217 individuals as of 2024. The local government had announced plans to develop this tourist attraction, by reducing the deer pen's area from 18 hectares down to 6 hectares, while also adding new facilities and special areas such as a fishing pond.
