= Babulu =

- District
- Interactive map of Babulu
- Location Babulu (Indonesia)
- Coordinates: 1°29′49.90873″S 116°27′54.22770″E
- Country: Indonesia
- Province: East Kalimantan
- Regency: Penajam North Paser
- Established: 11 June 1996
- District seat: Babulu Darat

Government
  - District head (Camat): Kansip

Area
  - Total: 522.75 km^{2} (201.83 sq mi)

Population (2023)
  - Total: 39,921
  - Density: 76.367/km^{2} (197.79/sq mi)
- Time zone: UTC+8 (ICT)
- Postal code: 76285
- Regional code: 64.09.03
- Villages: 12

Babulu is the southernmost district of Penajam North Paser Regency, in East Kalimantan, Indonesia. As of 2023, it was inhabited by 39,921 people, and currently has the total area of 522.75 km^{2}. Its district seat is located at the village of Babulu Darat. It was split from Waru on 11 June 1996.

The district borders Waru to the north and Long Kali (Paser) to the southwest.

== Governance ==
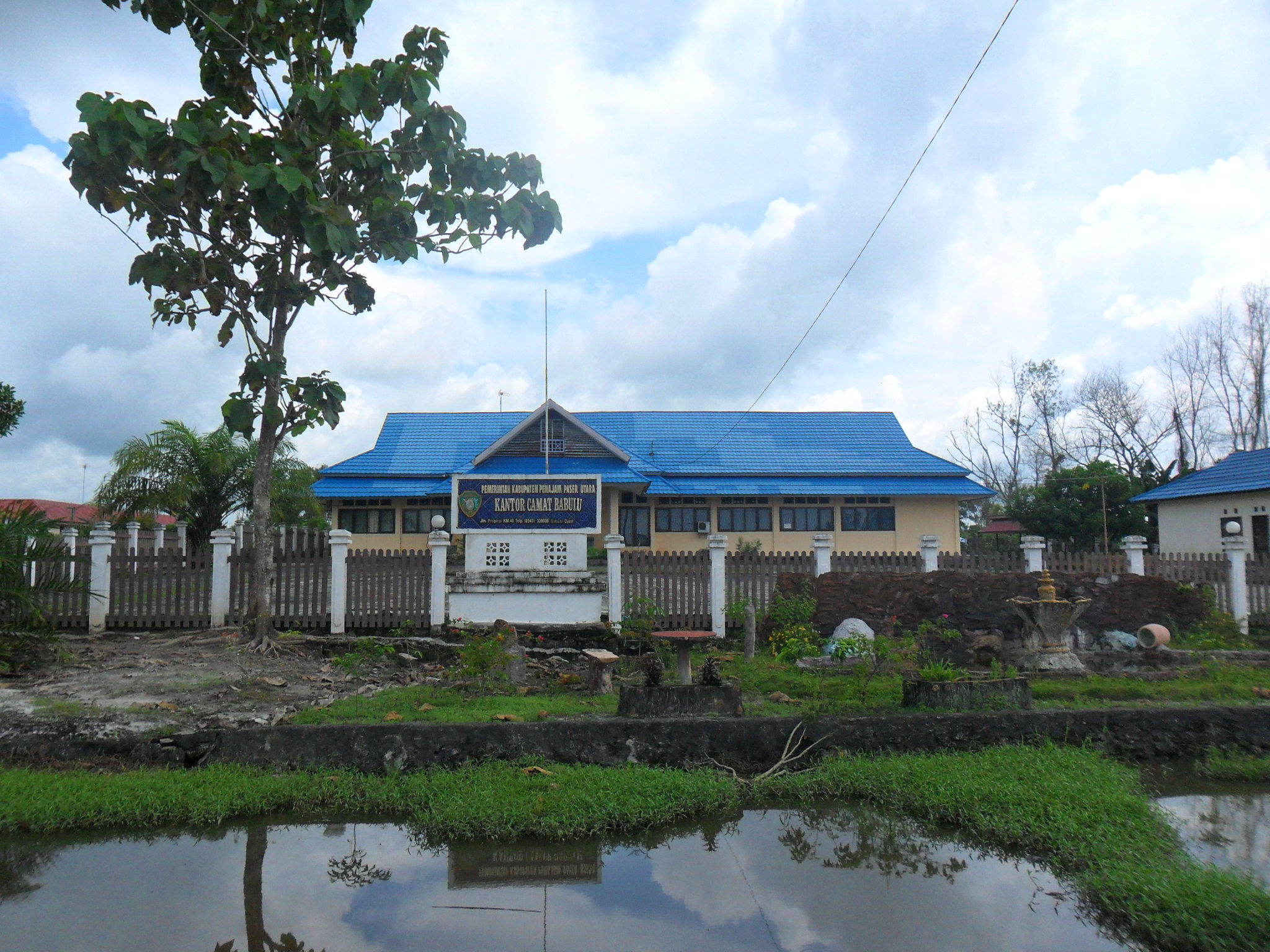
District head office at Babulu Darat, Babulu.

Map of villages in Babulu, after 2010

=== Villages ===
Babulu is divided into the following 12 villages (desa):

Regional code (Kode wilayah)	Name	Area (km^{2})	Population (2023)	Hamlets (dusun)	RT (rukun tetangga)
64.09.03.2001	Babulu Darat	105.71	11,445	2	32
64.09.03.2002	Labangka	162.68	3,970	2	20
64.09.03.2003	Babulu Laut	104.00	4,302	4	18
64.09.03.2004	Gunung Intan	12.54	3,328	4	19
64.09.03.2005	Gunung Makmur	17.88	2,321	3	16
64.09.03.2006	Sebakung Jaya	9.84	1,867	2	15
64.09.03.2007	Rawa Mulia	9.69	1,775	2	15
64.09.03.2008	Sri Raharja	9.00	1,397	2	10
64.09.03.2009	Sumber Sari	11.52	1,725	2	16
64.09.03.2010	Rintik	40.69	2,190		10
64.09.03.2011	Gunung Mulia	12.29	2,637		16
64.09.03.2012	West Labangka (Labangka Barat)	26.92	2,964		10
	Totals	522.75	39,921	23	197
