= Benuaq language =

East Barito language spoken in Indonesia

Benuaq
- Native to: Indonesia
- Region: East Kalimantan
- Ethnicity: Benuaq people
- Language family: Austronesian: Malayo-Polynesian; East Barito; Northeast Barito; Lawangan; Benuaq
- Dialects: Jerang Dayak; Muara Lawa; Jambuk; Tanjung Isuy; Keay; Temula; Ohokng
- Writing system: Latin

Language codes
- ISO 639-3: –
- Glottolog: benu1246

Benuaq is an Austronesian languages spoken in East Kalimantan, Indonesia, primarily in the West Kutai Regency. Benuaq language is a dialect or a language closely related to the Lawangan language and is traditionally spoken by the Benuaq people.

Currently, Benuaq language does not have its own ISO 639-3 code.

== Classification ==
Benuaq belongs to the Austronesian family and is part of the Malayo-Polynesian branch. In the classification followed by Glottolog, it falls within East Barito, Northeast Barito, and Lawangan, where Benua is listed as a variety of Lawangan.

The position of the Barito languages is itself subject to classificatory debate. Alexander D. Smith argues that the Barito languages are better understood as a historical linkage of varieties rather than as a single subgroup descended from an established Proto-Barito language. In his classification, Benuaq belongs with Lawangan, Bentian, Paser and Tawoyan in the Northeast Barito portion of the Barito linkage.

Earlier Indonesian descriptions and ethnographic works likewise associate Benuaq with the Luangan or Lawangan complex of languages, while emphasizing the substantial differences between Benuaq and Lawangan varieties. A 2018 study citing Indonesian government language mapping notes that Benuaq differed from surrounding languages by roughly 82–95% in dialectometric comparisons and that the reported difference between Benuaq and Lawangan was 95.5%.

Because the principal international language databases currently subsume Benuaq under Lawangan while the Indonesian government recognizes it independently, it is preferable not to present either treatment as the only universally accepted classification.

== Geographic distribution ==
The Indonesian language-mapping database identifies Benuaq speech communities in West Kutai Regency, East Kalimantan, specifically in the villages of Jerang Dayak in Muara Pahu District, Muara Lawa in Muara Lawa District, Jambuk in Bongan District, Tanjung Isuy in Jempang District, Ohokng in Jempang District, Keay in Damai District, and Temula in Nyuatan District.

Benuaq-speaking communities also occur within a wider area of West Kutai and the Mahakam region. Ethnographic research describes the Benuaq population as extending from the Bongan area east of Lake Jempang through the Tunjung highlands and the Kedang Pahu drainage toward tributaries of the Teweh, including areas in Central Kalimantan.

== Dialects ==
The Indonesian government's language survey recognizes seven Benuaq dialects:

- Jerang Dayak
- Muara Lawa
- Jambuk
- Tanjung Isuy
- Keay
- Temula
- Ohokng

The seven-way division is based on the geographic distribution recorded in the Indonesian language survey. The same survey reports substantial differences among the Benuaq varieties, with overall dialectometric differences of about 52–60%.

In international classifications, the situation is different. Glottolog treats Benua as one of the varieties of Lawangan, alongside varieties such as Bentian, Bawu, Pasir and others.

== Phonology ==
=== Consonants ===
Consonant Benuaq
Manner of articulation	Voicing	Place of articulation					
Manner of articulation	Voicing	Bilabial	Labiodental	Alveolar	Palatal	Velar	Glottal
Plosive	Voiceless	/p/, /pm/	—	/t/, /tn/	/c/	/k/, /q/, /kŋ/	/ʔ/
Plosive	Voiced	/b/	—	/d/	/ɟ/	/g/	—
Fricative	Voiceless	—	—	/s/	—	—	/h/
Nasal	Voiced	/m/	—	/n/	/ɲ/	/ŋ/	—
Trill	Voiced	—	—	/r/	—	—	—
Lateral	Voiced	—	—	/l/	—	—	—
Approximant	Voiced	/w/	—	—	/j/	—	—

=== Vowels ===
Vowel Benuaq
Height	Tongue position		
Height	Front	Central	Back
Close	/i/, /iː/	—	/u/, /uː/
Close-mid	/e/, /eː/	—	/o/, /oː/
Mid	—	/ə/	—
Open	—	/a/, /aː/	—

== Grammar ==
Published grammatical description of Benuaq is more limited than its phonological documentation. A study of Benuaq in Jengan Danum, Damai District, identifies prefixes, a suffix, and combinations of affixes. The prefixes reported in that study include be-, pe-, peN-, te- and N-, while the suffix is -tn; combinations including ke- + N- and se- + N- are also reported.

The study reports that these affixes can participate in changes of lexical category and express meanings associated with actions, results, occupations and ongoing activities.

Further grammatical work is needed before a comprehensive account of Benuaq syntax, clause structure and morphosyntax can be given with confidence.

== Writing system ==
Modern published Benuaq materials use the Latin script. The Benuaq–Indonesian dictionary published by the regional language authority arranges entries according to the Latin alphabet.

The spelling of the language name itself has varied in published sources. Forms including Benuaq, Benua and Benua’ have been recorded, reflecting differences in the representation of the final consonant or glottal stop in different orthographic traditions.
