= Northeast Barito languages =

Group of Austronesian languages

Northeast Barito
- Geographic distribution: Indonesia (Central Kalimantan, East Kalimantan, and South Kalimantan)
- Ethnicity: Various subgroups of Dayaks
- Linguistic classification: Austronesian: Malayo-Polynesian; (Barito); East Barito; Northeast Barito
- Subdivisions: Bentian; Benuaq; Lawangan; Paser; Taboyan

Language codes
- Glottolog: nort2888

The Northeast Barito languages (Indonesian: rumpun bahasa Barito Timur Laut) consist of several East Barito languages belonging to distinct Dayak subgroups. The languages include Bentian, Benuaq, Lawangan (most notable), Paser, and Tawoyan (or Taboyan), all of them are spoken in southeastern Kalimantan.

By far, only Lawangan and Tawoyan have received their own ISO 639-3 codes, lbx and twy, respectively. Because of this, all Northeast Barito languages but Tawoyan, are grouped as 'dialects' of Lawangan for convenience reasons, by Glottolog, for example.

== Characteristics ==
This section primarily deals with Benuaq, Taboyan, and Paser, based on Alexander D. Smith's paper in 2018.

=== Rhotacism ===
In Paser, Taboyan, and Benuaq, *-d and *l went rhotacised into -r. On the last two examples, the instances of *j had been already merged with *d.

PMP	→	Daughter
*kapal 'thick'	→	Benuaq kapar
*quləj 'maggot, worm'	→	Paser ulor
*pusəj 'navel'	→	Taboyan pusər

=== Status of schwa ===
Before the following occurred, final *a had become *ə. Paser rounded all instances of schwa (*ə) into o, while Taboyan and Benuaq follow that but only in penultimate syllables. In final syllables, Benuaq lowered *-ə and *-əC into -aʔ and -aC (and effectively reverting the previous change), while Taboyan preserved the schwa (-əʔ, -əC).

PMP	→	Daughter
*duha 'two'	→	Taboyan duəʔ
*kaʀəm 'capsize'	→	Paser kayom
