= Sepaku =

District of Penajam North Paser Regency, East Kalimantan

- District
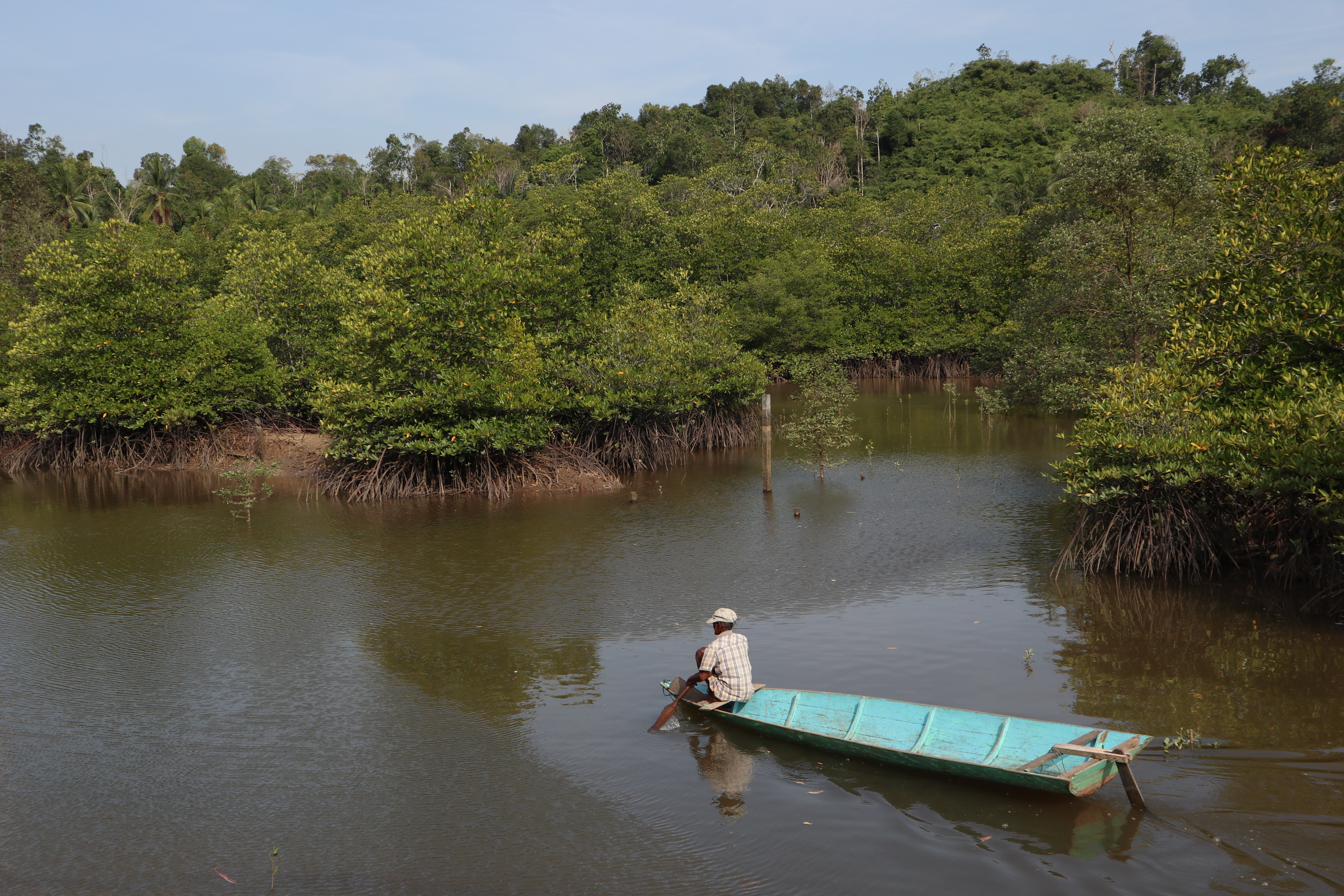
- Mangroves in Sepaku
- Interactive map of Sepaku
- Location Sepaku (Kalimantan) Sepaku (Indonesia)
- Coordinates: 0.918540°S 116.834482°E
- Country: Indonesia
- Province: East Kalimantan
- Regency: Penajam North Paser
- District creation: 11 June 1996
- District seat: Tengin Baru

Government
  - District head (Camat): Gamaliel Abimanyu Arliandito

Area
  - Total: 1,172.36 km^{2} (452.65 sq mi)

Population (2024)
  - Total: 41,677
  - Density: 35.550/km^{2} (92.073/sq mi)
- Time zone: UTC+8 (ICT)
- Postal code: 76146–76149
- Regional code: 64.09.04
- Villages: 15

Sepaku (Indonesian pronunciation: [səˈpaku]) is an administrative district (kecamatan) of Penajam North Paser Regency, East Kalimantan, Indonesia. As of 2024, it was inhabited by 41,677 people, an increase from 40,322 people in 2023 and 39,738 people in 2022, and currently has the total area of 1,172.36 km^{2}. Its district seat is located at the village of Tengin Baru.

The modern district of Sepaku was split off from Penajam on 11 June 1996, and it likewise belonged to the city of Balikpapan until 1987. Since 2019, Sepaku has been designated as the site of the future national capital of Nusantara, including the entirety of Main Governmental Zone (KIPP). The local government of Penajam North Paser once claimed that it would only consist of around 10% to 20% of the current total area.

== Etymology ==
According to the website of the Sukaraja village, Sepaku (and also the eponymous urban village of Sepaku) is named after the abundance of ferns (paku) in that district.

== History ==
The originally inhabitants of Sepaku were the Balik people (a subgroup of the Paser people), who migrated from neighbouring Balikpapan (then known as Tanjung Gonggot).

Before its establishment in its current form, Sepaku was known for being a destination for transmigrants, mostly of the Javanese ethnicity, with the land established in 1968 by a gubernatorial decree. Its settlement started on 26 August 1975 at the village of Sepaku I (now Bukit Raya), and ended in 1984 at Semoi III (now Sukomulyo). Along with Penajam (then known as Balikpapan Seberang), it was part of Balikpapan until 1987. Another transmigration programs occurred in 1991 and 1998.

On 11 June 1996, following the enactment of the government regulation number 38, Sepaku was formed from the northern parts of Penajam, along with the formation of 12 others in East and North Kalimantan. Its formation was inaugurated on 25 September 1996 by then East Kalimantan governor H. Muhammad Ardans. On 5 March 1999, seven numbered villages were renamed by a gubernatorial decree, and only one (Semoi II or Semoi Dua) currently retains its name:

- Sepaku I became Bukit Raya
- Sepaku II became Sukaraja
- Sepaku III became Tengin Baru
- Sepaku IV became Bumi Harapan
- Semoi I became Argomulyo
- Semoi III became Sukomulyo
- Semoi IV became Wonosari

Since 2002, Sepaku has been a part of Penajam North Paser Regency (Penajam Paser Utara, or PPU), after it split from Paser Regency (then Pasir). Eight years later, on 14 April 2010, Binuang and Telemow villages were formed from parts of Maridan by local regulation number 6. Before being chosen for the site of the future Indonesian capital in 2019, there had been demands from the district to secede from PPU due to lags in development.

== Geography ==
Sepaku shares borders with West Balikpapan (Balikpapan) to southeast; West Samboja, Loa Janan, and Loa Kulu (Kutai Kartanegara) to the east and the north; Bongan (West Kutai) to the northwest; Long Kali (Paser) to the southwest; and Penajam to the south. The average elevation in Sepaku is 15 meters above sea level.

As of 2019, dozens of rivers were listed in Sepaku:

River name	Villages
Bentayan	Pemaluan
Biangai	Bumi Harapan
Daub	Mentawir
Kali Wangi	Sukomulyo
Kemantis	Mentawir
Larung	Binuang and Pemaluan
Mangkulio	Bukit Raya and Bumi Harapan
Miyango	Karang Jinawi
Muntayo	Argomulyo, Semoi Dua, and Wonosari
Pemaluan	Binuang, Pemaluan, and Telemow
Seluang	Sukaraja
Semoi	Sukaraja
Sepaku	Bukit Raya, Sukaraja, and Sepaku
Sepinggan	Sukomulyo
Tengin	Tengin Baru
Trunen	Bumi Harapan and Pemaluan

Sepaku has been long prone to floods even before the establishment of Nusantara. As of mid 2023, 257 floods were recorded throughout 7 villages.

== Governance ==
=== Villages ===
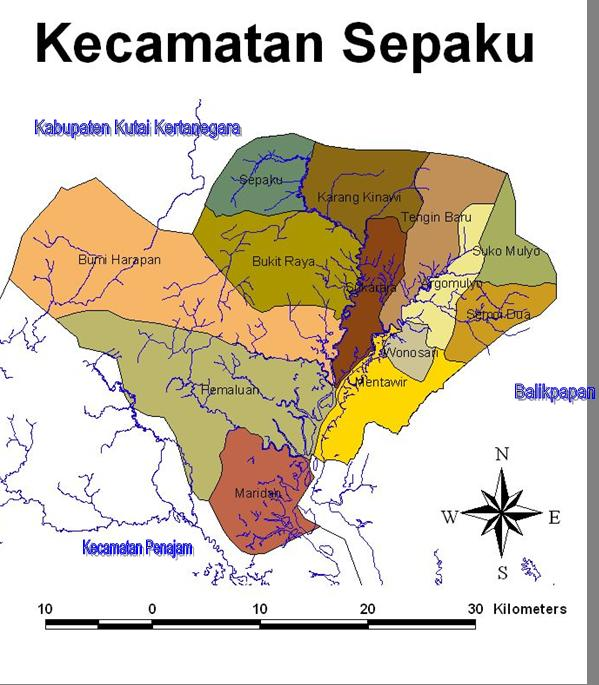
Map of villages in Sepaku before 2010

Map of villages in Sepaku after 2010

Sepaku Penajam is divided into the following fifteen villages (four classed as urban kelurahan, eleven as rural desa, the former are marked by a grey background), listed with their areas and their estimated populations as at mid 2023 and 2024:

Regional code (Kode wilayah)	Name	Area (km^{2})	Pop'n (2023)	Pop'n (2024)	RW (rukun warga)
64.09.04.1007	Maridan	37.05	4,165	4,246	-
64.09.04.1008	Mentawir	132.24	777	802	-
64.09.04.1006	Pemaluan	367.18	1,904	1,989	-
64.09.04.2004	Bumi Harapan (Sepaku IV)	15.00	2,380	2,543	2
64.09.04.2012	Wonosari (Semoi IV)	33.41	1,317	1,367	2
64.09.04.2010	Semoi Dua (Semoi II)	74.47	3,407	3,483	4
64.09.04.2009	Argomulyo (Semoi I)	36.14	3,387	3,437	5
64.09.04.2011	Sukomulyo (Semoi III)	27.11	2,214	2,298	3
64.09.04.2001	Tengin Baru (Sepaku III)	43.48	4,306	4,463	5
64.09.04.2003	Sukaraja (Sepaku II)	77.38	4,263	4,467	5
64.09.04.2002	Bukit Raya (Sepaku I)	185.34	3,119	3,308	2
64.09.04.1005	Sepaku	133.97	2,021	2,113	-
64.09.04.2013	Karang Jinawi	13.85	1,163	1,198	2
64.09.04.2014	Telemow	4.82	3,655	3,704	3
64.09.04.2015	Binuang	17.65	2,244	2,259	2
	Totals	1,172.36	40,322	41,677	35

=== District heads ===
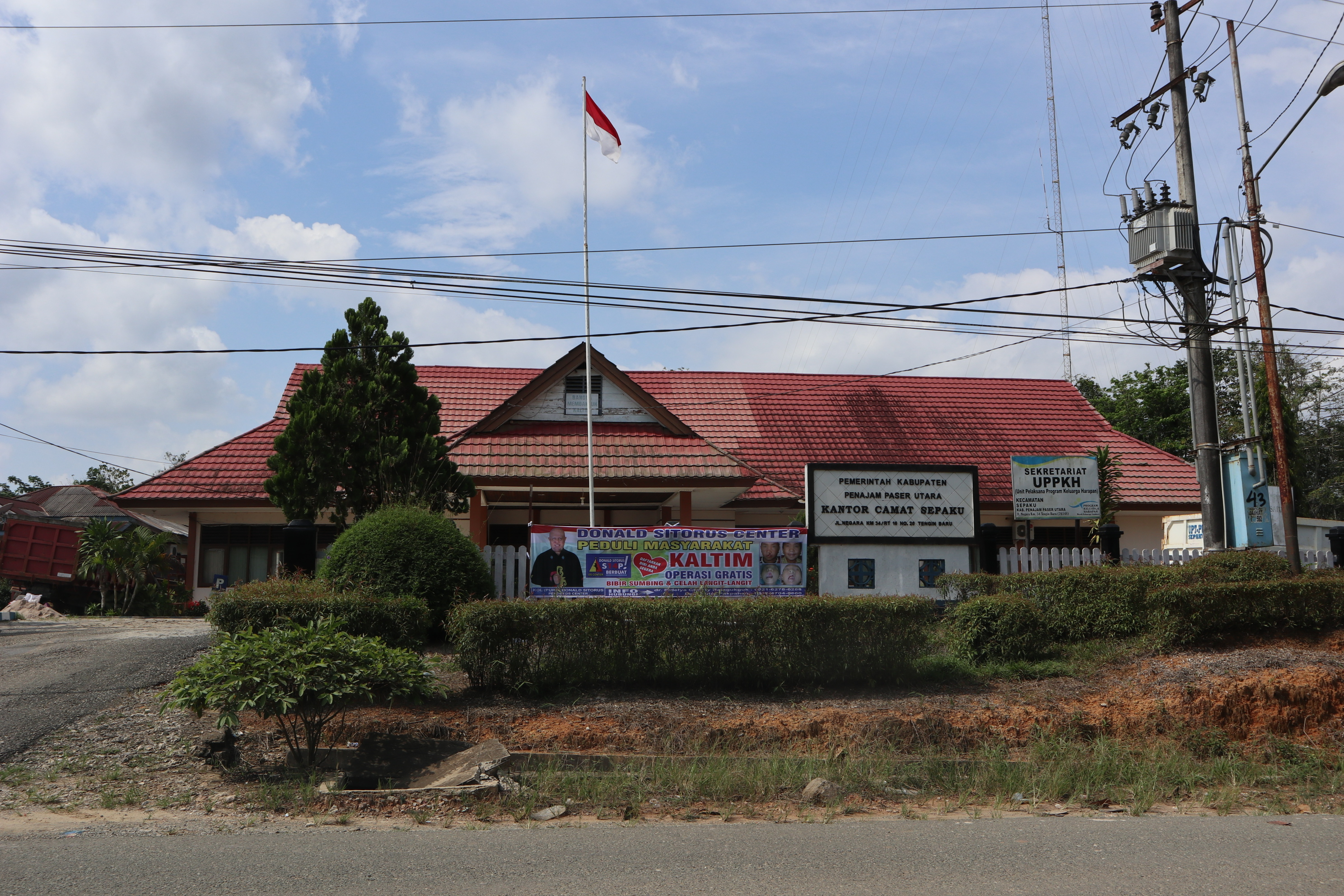
The district head office of Sepaku, located at the village of Tengin Baru.

The following are the list of district heads (camat) of Sepaku:

#	Name	Took office	Left office
1	Baharuddin	1997	2000
2	Tasmad Hariady	2000	2002
3	Hardani Har	2002	2004
4	Suhardi	2004	2005
5	Muhammad	2005	2009
6	Nurzaman	2009	2011
7	Daman	2011	2013
8	Risman Abdul	2013	20??

== Demographics ==
Historical population
Year	Pop.	±%
2008	30,708	—
2009	30,861	+0.5%
2010	30,863	+0.0%
2013	35,479	+15.0%
2014	39,173	+10.4%
2015	36,565	−6.7%
2016	36,627	+0.2%
2017	36,382	−0.7%
2018	36,161	−0.6%
2019	35,592	−1.6%
2020	37,171	+4.4%
2021	36,218	−2.6%
2022	39,738	+9.7%
2023	40,322	+1.5%
2024	41,677	+3.4%
2025	42,412	+1.8%
Source: Annual publications Kecamatan Sepaku Dalam Angka 2009–2025 by Statistics Indonesia. The estimate for 2025 came from Kabupaten Penajam Paser Utara Dalam Angka 2026.

As of 2023, Sepaku was inhabited by 40,322 people (comprising 20,848 males and 19,474 females).

=== Religion ===
As of 2023, by far the largest religious group in Sepaku were Muslims (36,461 people), followed by smaller minorities including Protestants (6,488 people), Catholics (1,007 people), Hindus (21 people), and Buddhists (8 people). Places of worships in Sepaku included 17 mosques, 30 small pray rooms (mushola), 24 Protestant churches, and a Catholic church.

== Education ==
As of 2022/2023 school year, Sepaku had 15 private kindergartens, 29 elementary schools (4 of them were private), 8 junior high schools (3 were private), a madrasah tsanawiyah (an Islamic counterpart of the former), 2 senior high schools (each private and public), and a private madrasah aliyah (an Islamic counterpart of the former). Notable schools at Sepaku include:

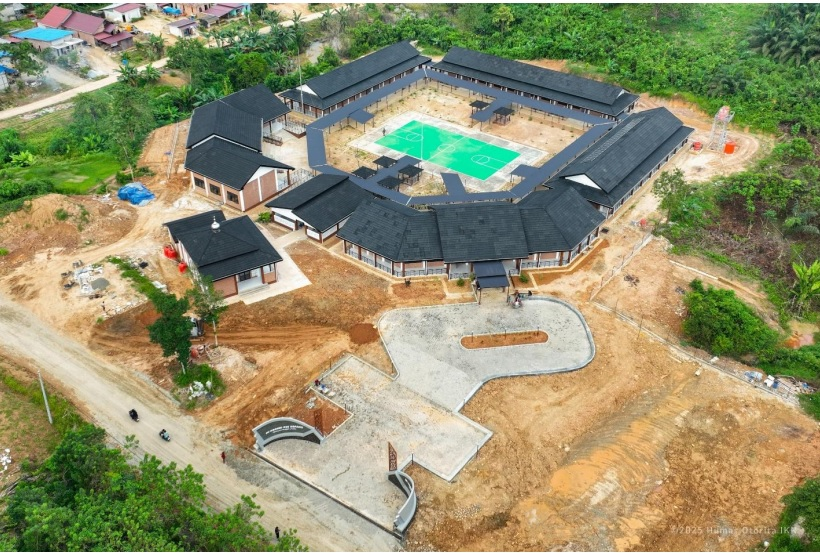
SD Negeri 020 Sepaku

- SD Negeri 020 Sepaku, which was relocated from its original flood-prone location, into a new building constructed by Astra Educational Foundation — Michael D. Ruslim.

== Health ==
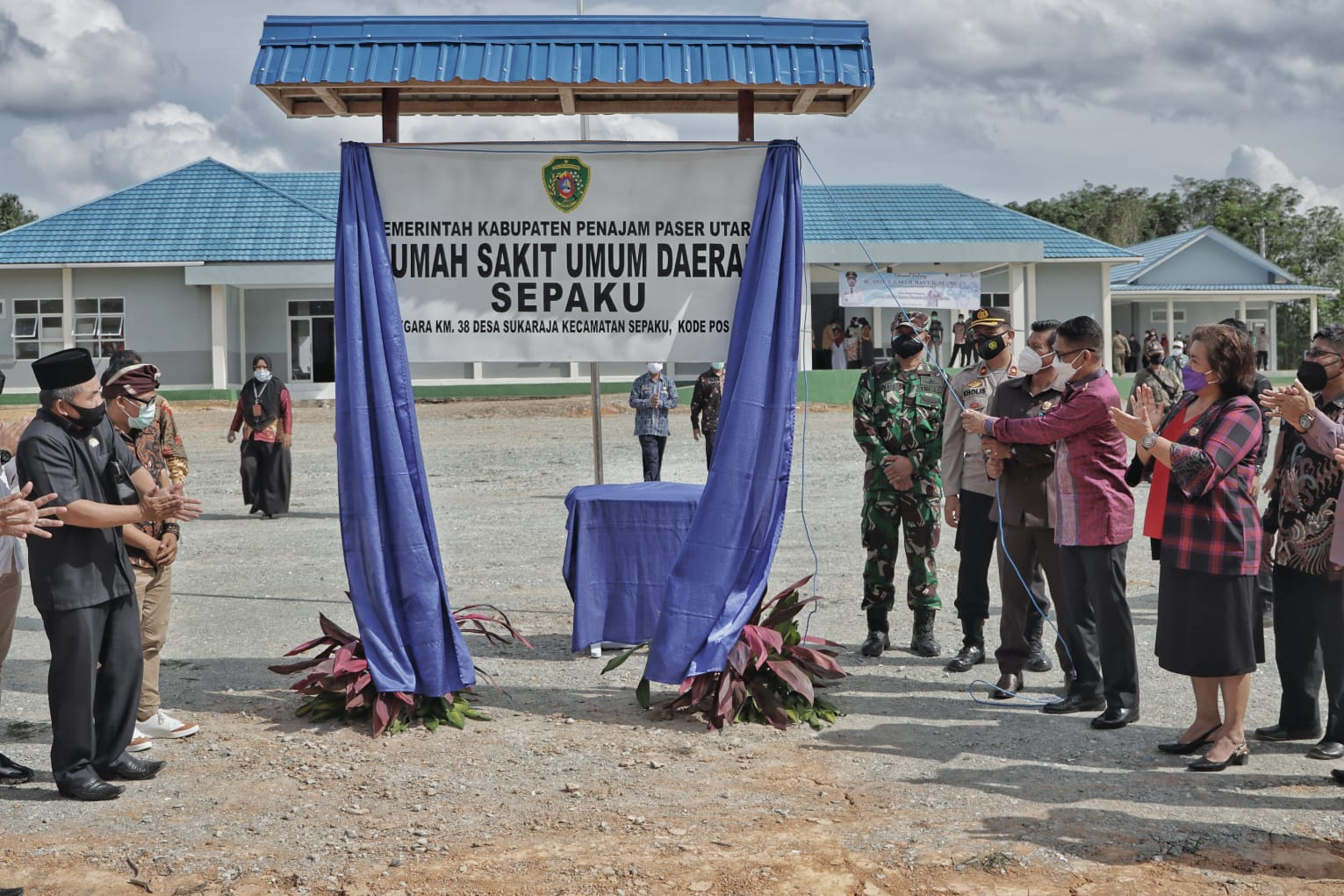
The inauguration of Sepaku Regional Public Hospital at Sepaku

As of 2022, Sepaku had 4 public health centers (puskesmas), 2 pharmacies, and each one hospital and polyclinic. The first hospital at the district, Sepaku Regional Public Hospital, was inaugurated on 5 August 2021 by the regional secretary of PPU, Muliadi, and it began to provide health services on 10 January 2022.

== See also ==
- Nusantara, the newly-proposed capital of Indonesia, mostly located within Sepaku
