= Lawangan language =

Austronesian language spoken in Kalimantan, Indonesia

Lawangan
- Native to: Indonesia
- Region: Kalimantan
- Ethnicity: Lawangan people
- Native speakers: (120,000 cited 1981)
- Language family: Austronesian: Malayo-Polynesian; East Barito; Northeast Barito; Lawangan

Language codes
- ISO 639-3: lbx
- Glottolog: lawa1257

Lawangan is an Austronesian language of the East Barito group. It is spoken by about 100,000 Lawangan people (one of the Dayak peoples) living in the central Kalimantan, Indonesia. Lawangan has a high degree of dialectal diversity.

== Dialects ==
Lawangan no. 28

Lawangan is divided into at least several dialects, including:

- Ajuh
- Bakoi (Lampüng)
- Bantian (Bentian), spoken at Bentian Besar, West Kutai Regency
- Banuwang
- Bawu (Bawo)
- Benuaq
- Kali
- Karau (Beloh)
- Lawa
- Lolang
- Mantararen
- Njumit
- Paser / Pasir. This dialect is spoken at Paser Regency and its surroundings. This dialect is also often known as "Paser language".
- Purai
- Purung
- Tuwang

== Phonology ==
=== Consonants ===
		Labial	Alveolar	Palatal	Velar	Glottal
Plosive	voiceless	p	t		k	ʔ
Plosive	voiced	b	d	dʒ	ɡ	
Nasal		m	n	ɲ	ŋ	
Fricative			s			
Trill			r			
Lateral			l			
Approximant		w		j		

=== Vowels ===
	Front	Central	Back
Close	i		u
Mid	ɛ	ə	ɔ
Open		a	
