= Penajam =

- District
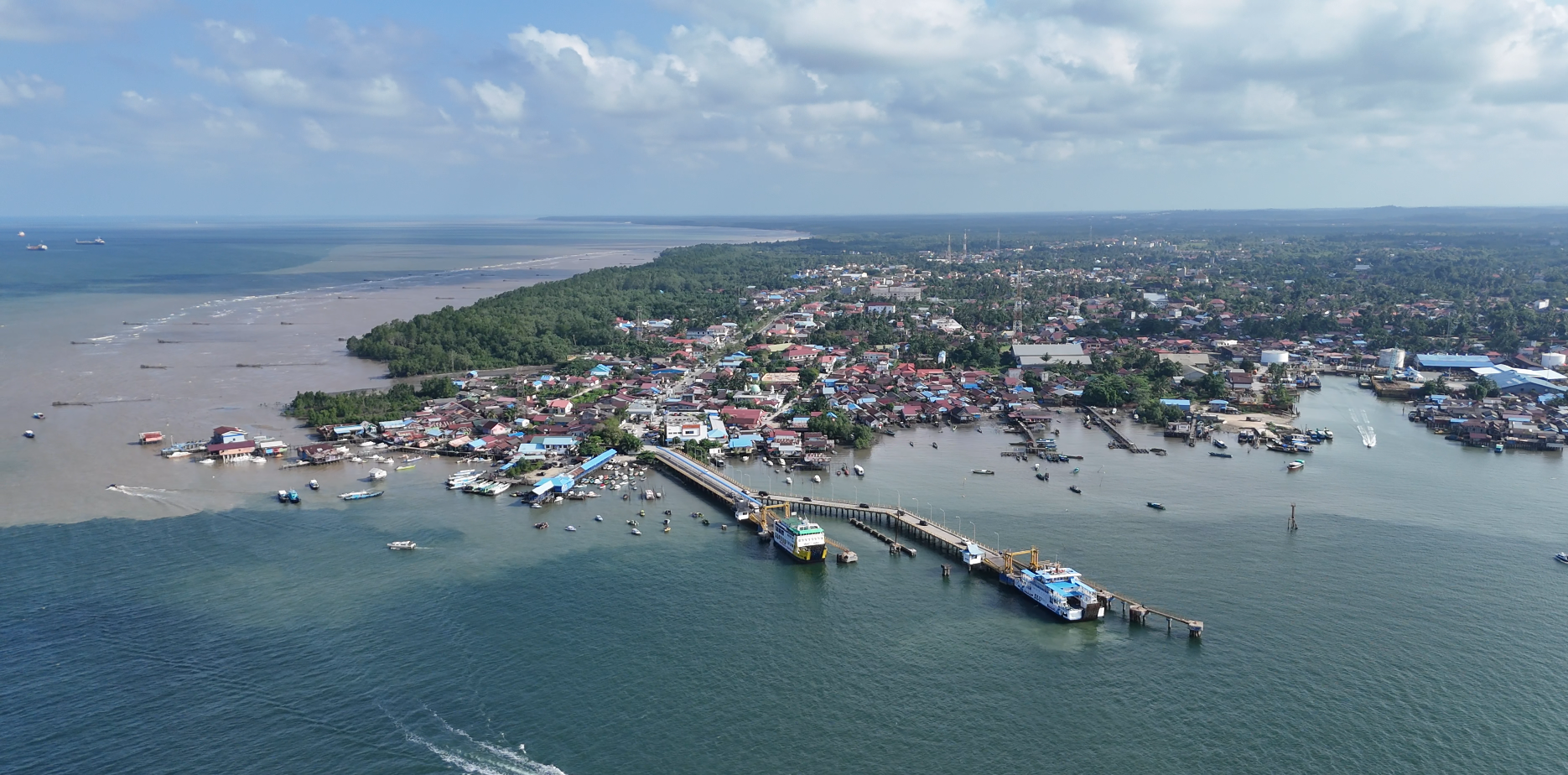
- Ferry port at Penajam, with services across Balikpapan Bay to Balikpapan city and to Kariangau.
- Interactive map of Penajam
- Location Penajam (Indonesia)
- Coordinates: 1.301967°S 116.735195°E
- Country: Indonesia
- Province: East Kalimantan
- Regency: Penajam North Paser
- District seat: Nipah-Nipah

Area
  - Total: 1,207.37 km^{2} (466.17 sq mi)

Population (2023)
  - Total: 95,358
  - Density: 78.980/km^{2} (204.56/sq mi)
- Time zone: UTC+8 (WITA)
- Postal code: 76141–76146
- Regional code: 64.09.01
- Villages: 23

Penajam (Indonesian pronunciation: [pəˈnadʒam], formerly known as Balikpapan Seberang between 1969 and 1987), is an administrative district (kecamatan) of East Kalimantan province of Indonesia; it includes the administrative capital of Penajam North Paser Regency on Kalimantan, Indonesian Borneo. As at mid 2025, it was inhabited by 100,053 people, and currently has a total land area of 1,207.37 km^{2}. Its district seat is located at the village of Nipah-Nipah.

The district borders Sepaku District to the north, Waru District to the southwest, and Long Kali District (Paser Regency) to the west. It is also separated from Balikpapan (of which the district was formerly part until 1987) by Balikpapan Bay to northeast.

== History ==
=== Etymology ===
According to local legends, a group of robbers from this town were defeated by another group of robbers from Sangkulirang. This situation forced them to stop (Buginese: pajan) becoming robbers. This word eventually evolved into its current form, Penajam. The district's former name before 1987, Balikpapan Seberang, simply refers to its location separated by Balikpapan Bay from the city's mainland.

=== Modern history ===
On 24 April 1969, Penajam was transferred from Kutai Regency to Balikpapan by gubernatorial decree 55/TH-Pem/SK/1969. Since that date, the district had been known as Balikpapan Seberang (lit. "opposite of Balikpapan") until 13 October 1987, when it was transferred again to Pasir Regency by government regulation number 21, and the name change was reverted. On 11 June 1996, the northern parts of the district (consisting of twelve villages) were separated off to form Sepaku District. This latter district would eventually become the location of newly-built national capital Nusantara.

On 16 October 2019, riots sparked at Penajam following an assault case at Nipah-Nipah Beach, causing damages on nearby buildings.

== Geography ==
=== Climate ===
Penajam has a tropical rainforest climate (Af) with heavy rainfall year-round.

Climate data for Penajam
Month	Jan	Feb	Mar	Apr	May	Jun	Jul	Aug	Sep	Oct	Nov	Dec	Year
Mean daily maximum °C (°F)	29.5 (85.1)	30.0 (86.0)	30.0 (86.0)	29.7 (85.5)	29.8 (85.6)	29.2 (84.6)	28.6 (83.5)	29.2 (84.6)	29.3 (84.7)	29.9 (85.8)	29.7 (85.5)	29.6 (85.3)	29.5 (85.2)
Daily mean °C (°F)	26.1 (79.0)	26.4 (79.5)	26.4 (79.5)	26.3 (79.3)	26.6 (79.9)	26.2 (79.2)	25.8 (78.4)	26.2 (79.2)	26.3 (79.3)	26.6 (79.9)	26.3 (79.3)	26.2 (79.2)	26.3 (79.3)
Mean daily minimum °C (°F)	22.8 (73.0)	22.9 (73.2)	22.9 (73.2)	23.0 (73.4)	23.4 (74.1)	23.3 (73.9)	23.0 (73.4)	23.3 (73.9)	23.3 (73.9)	23.3 (73.9)	23.0 (73.4)	22.9 (73.2)	23.1 (73.5)
Average rainfall mm (inches)	223 (8.8)	191 (7.5)	248 (9.8)	224 (8.8)	230 (9.1)	195 (7.7)	182 (7.2)	161 (6.3)	144 (5.7)	140 (5.5)	180 (7.1)	224 (8.8)	2,342 (92.3)
Source: Climate-Data.org

== Governance ==
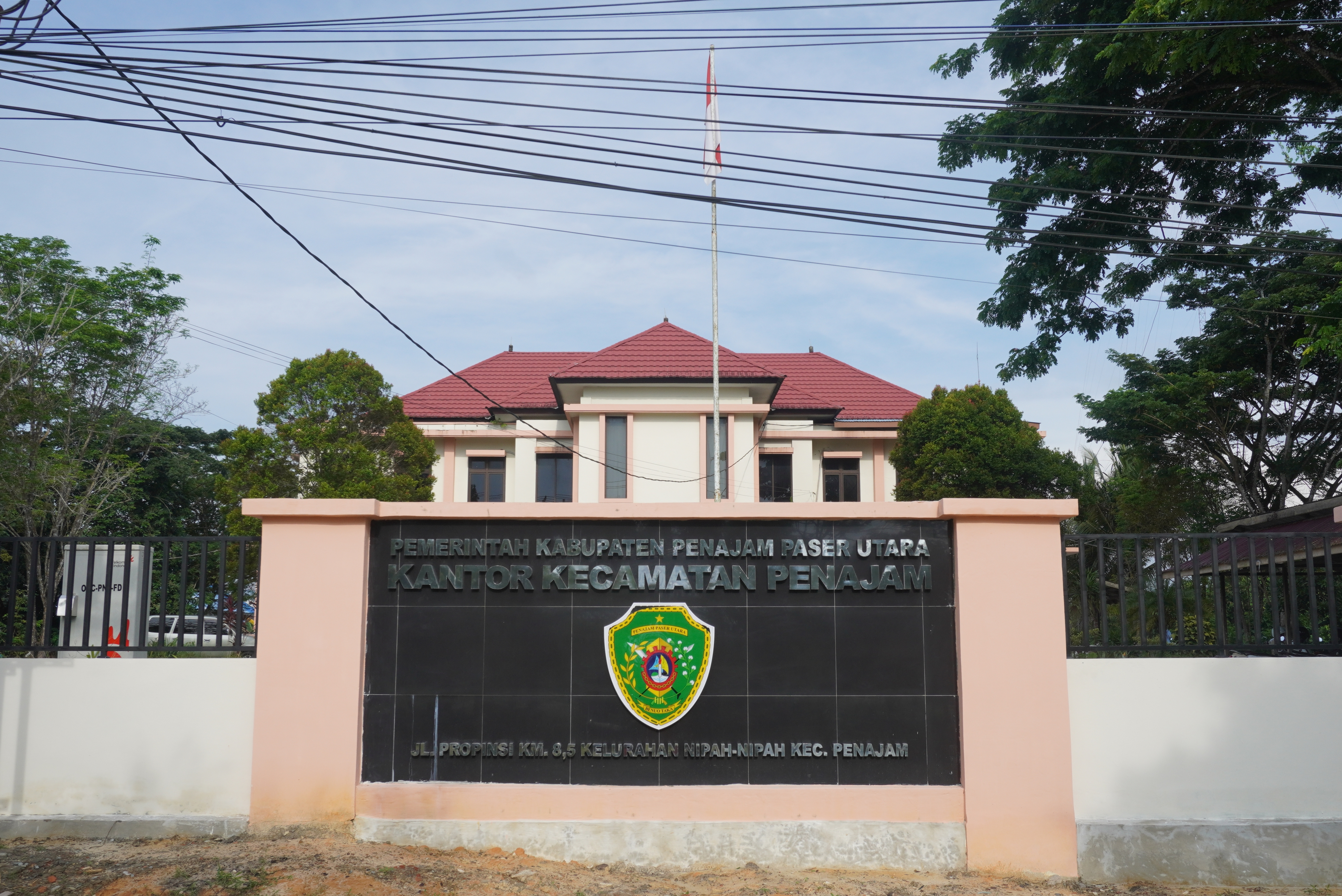
District head office at Nipah-Nipah, Penajam .

=== Villages ===
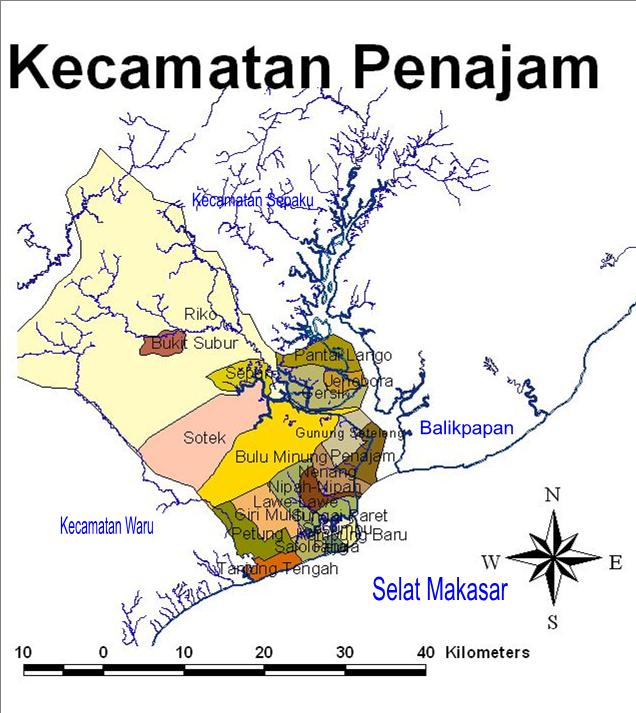
Map of villages in Penajam, before 2010

Map of villages in Penajam, after 2010

Penajam is divided into the following 23 villages (nineteen classed as urban kelurahan, four as rural desa, the latter are marked by a grey background), listed with their areas and their estimated populations as at mid 2024:

Regional code (Kode wilayah)	Name	Area (km^{2})	Pop'n (2024)	RT (rukun tetangga)
64.09.01.1001	Tanjung Tengah	22.20	2,738	17
64.09.01.1002	Salo Loang	20.21	2,237	7
64.09.01.1003	Petung	10.23	10,263	11
64.09.01.1004	Giri Mukti	16.00	8,296	14
64.09.01.1005	Lawe-Lawe	60.08	2,962	18
64.09.01.1006	Pejala	20.45	1,255	13
64.09.01.1007	Kampung Baru	31.57	653	14
64.09.01.1008	Sesumpu	17.88	952	8
64.09.01.1009	Sungai Parit	19.62	3,964	8
64.09.01.1010	Nipah-Nipah	70.51	4,061	12
64.09.01.1011	Nenang	25.13	7,446	10
64.09.01.1012	Gunung Seteleng	22.18	7,272	12
64.09.01.1013	Penajam	46.23	14,458	10
64.09.01.1014	Buluminung *	70.86	3,414	10
64.09.01.1015	Sotek *	157.96	6,755	10
64.09.01.1016	Sepan *	109.40	2,282	10
64.09.01.1017	Riko *	347.09	2,247	10
64.09.01.1018	Pantai Lango *	44.24	2,690	10
64.09.01.1019	Gersik *	41.51	2,073	10
64.09.01.2020	Jenebora *	45.02	3,475	10
64.09.01.2021	Bukit Subur *	9.60	982	10
64.09.01.2022	Sidorejo	8.96	3,085	10
64.09.01.2023	Giri Purwa	13.47	4,827	10
	Totals	1,207.37	98,387	253

The northern 8 villages (indicated by asterisks * in the table above) cover 825.68 km^{2} and had 23,918 inhabitants in 2024; the southern 15 villages cover 381.69 km^{2} and had 74,469 inhabitants in 2024.
