= Penajam North Paser Regency =

Regency in East Kalimantan, Indonesia

Penajam North Paser Regency Kabupaten Penajam Paser Utara
- Regency
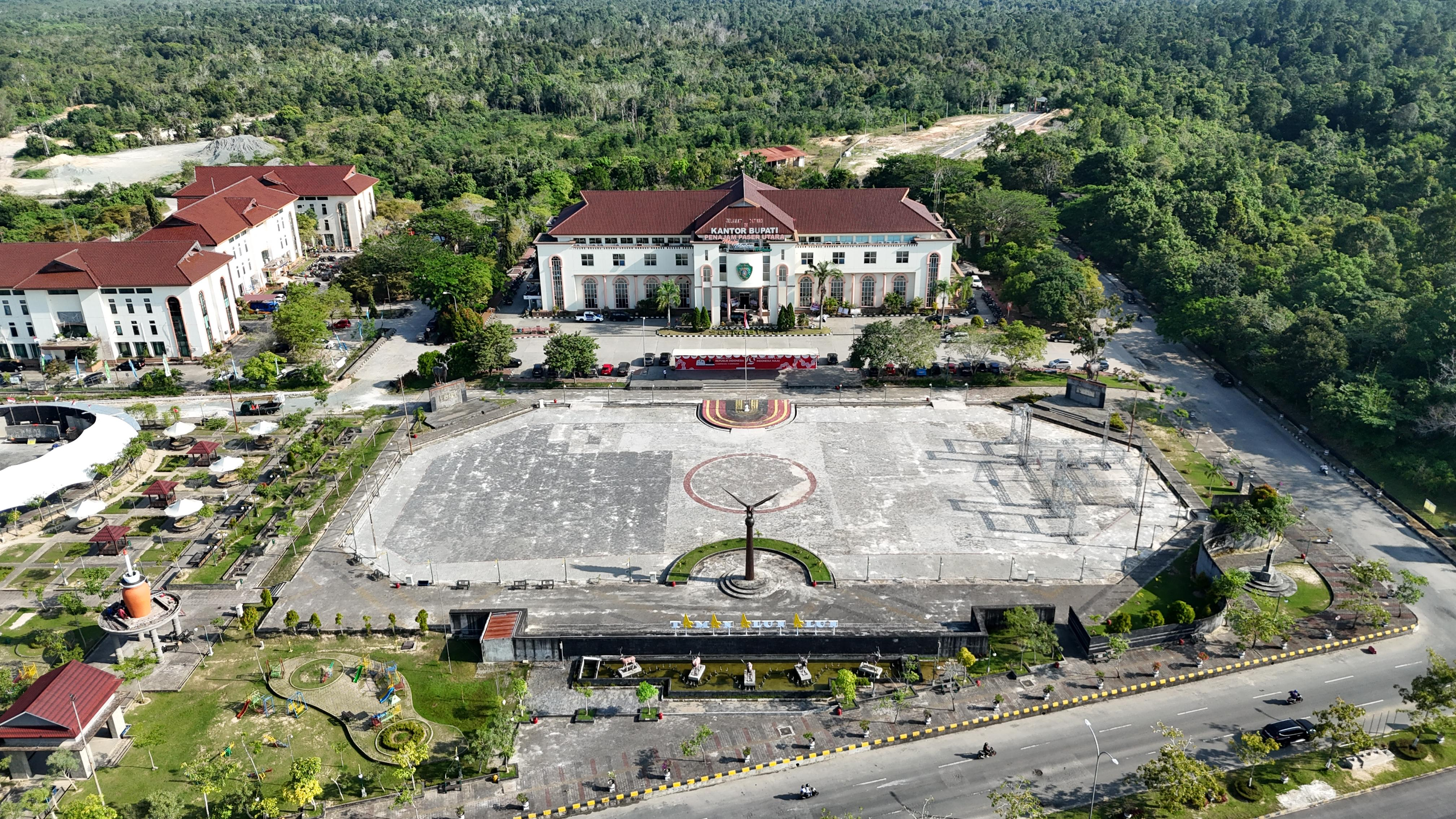
- Regent office building

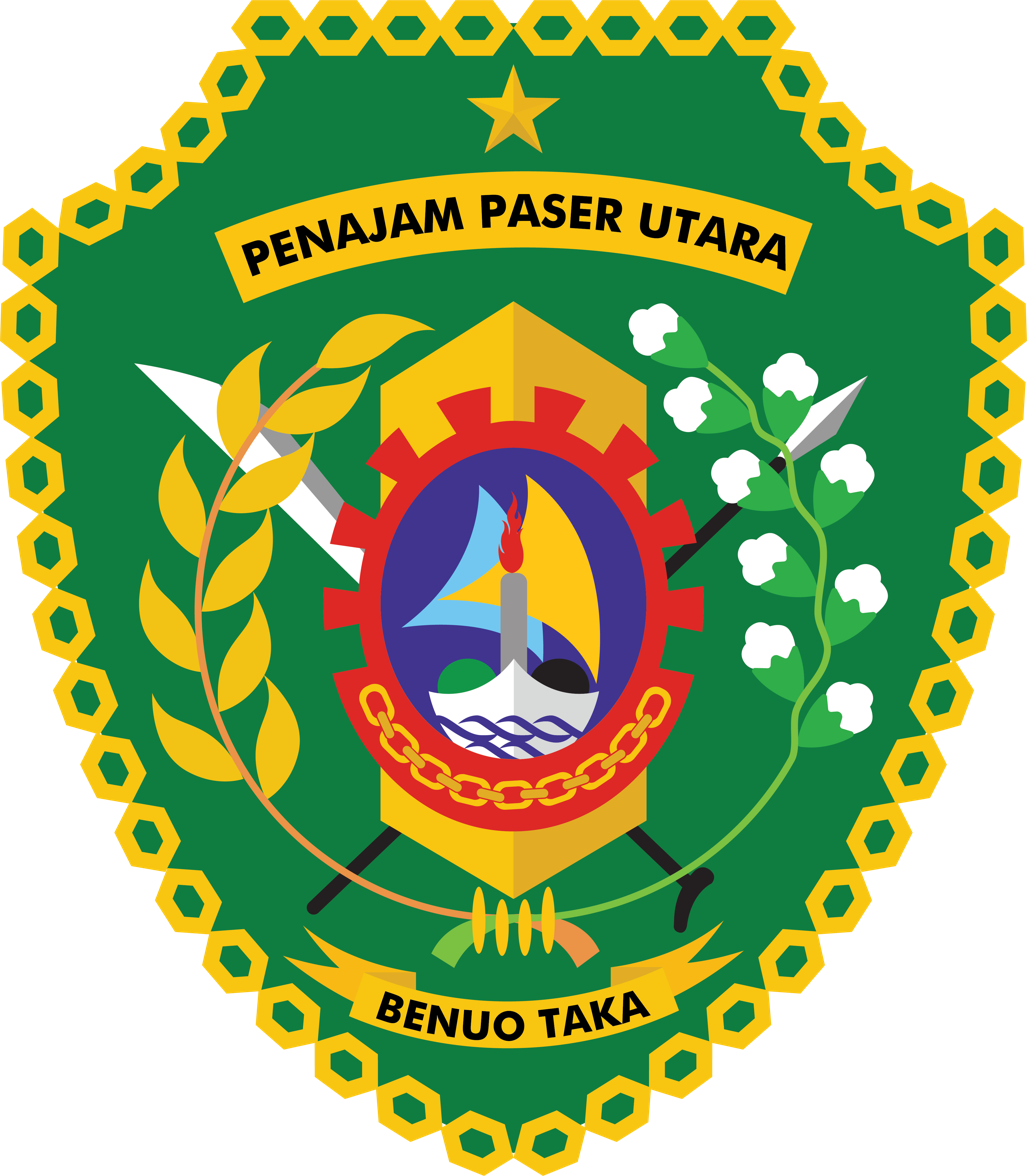
- Coat of arms
- Motto: Benuo Taka (Paser) "Our Land"
- Location within Indonesian province of East Kalimantan

- Location in East Kalimantan and Indonesia Penajam North Paser Regency (Indonesia)
- Coordinates: 1.291709°S 116.513796°E
- Country: Indonesia
- Province: East Kalimantan
- Regency seat: Penajam

Government
  - Regent: Mudyat Noor
  - Vice Regent: Abdul Waris Muin

Area
  - Total: 3,455.86 km^{2} (1,334.32 sq mi)
- Elevation: 0 m (0 ft)

Population (mid 2025 estimate)
  - Total: 205,456
  - Density: 59.4515/km^{2} (153.979/sq mi)
- Time zone: UTC+8 (WITA)
- Area code: (+62) 542/543
- HDI (2019): ▲0.716 (High)
- Website: penajamkab.go.id

Penajam North Paser Regency is a regency in the Indonesian province of East Kalimantan. Its administrative centre is the town of Penajam. The area which now forms Penajam North Paser was part of the Pasir Regency until its creation as a separate regency on 10 April 2002. It covers an area of 3,455.86 km^{2} (of which 3,060.82 km^{2} is land area and 272.24 km^{2} is sea area) and it had 142,922 inhabitants at the 2010 census and 178,681 at the 2020 census; the official estimate as at mid-2025 was 205,456 (comprising 106,346 males and 99,110 females). Penajam North Paser Regency has the smallest area among the seven regencies in East Kalimantan province.

The regency was historically part of the Paser Kingdom, which was a dependency of the Banjar Sultanate. As the second youngest regency in East Kalimantan, it had been previously affected by frequent territorial changes, to the extent that between 1956 and 1959, the modern-day regency was actually divided into half between Kotabaru of South Kalimantan and Special Region of Kutai of East Kalimantan. In 2019, parts of the regency, entirely consisting of Sepaku district, were designated to be included in the location of the new Indonesian national capital.

== Etymology ==
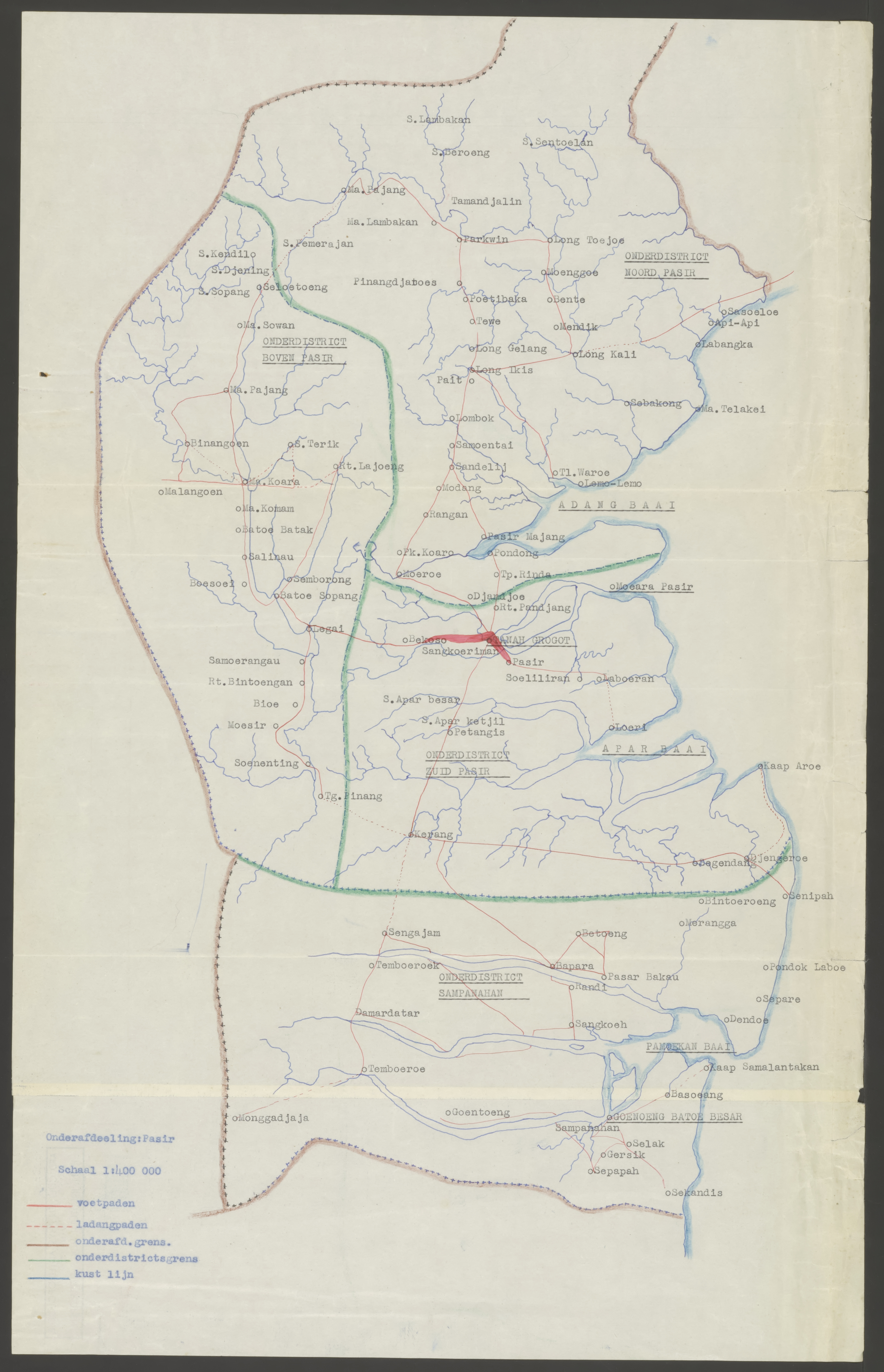
Map of Onderafdeeling Pasir in 1936, showing the older definition of North Pasir (Onderdistrict Noord-Pasir), which included present-day Babulu and Waru as well.

The word "Paser" is claimed to be from two combinations of words in the native language of the Paser people, "pa" which means "bright" and "ser" which means "spirit". Combined, the word "Paser" roughly means "bright spirit". The word "Paser" also originated from the name of a former kingdom in the region, Paser Kingdom. Penajam is a name used to refer to the region where the regency seat is now located. As the regency was formerly the northern part of the Paser Kingdom and the region used to be called Penajam, it was named Penajam North Paser Regency.

While the southern half (Waru and Babulu) were indeed part of the former district of North Pasir (not to be confused with Penajam North Paser, as shown on the map above), they only consisted 19.88% of its total area as the district extended as far south as Kuaro. The English translation of this regency name has varied between Penajam North Paser, Penajam–North Paser, North Paser Penajam, North Paser–Penajam, North Paser of Penajam, and also the incorrect North Penajam Paser. The first one, is used on publications by Statistics Indonesia (BPS), Google Earth, and Google Maps, but the last one is still upheld by Google Translate as well as many other publications in English. The regency's name is sometimes shortened into Penajam, though this abbreviation may lead into confusion with the name of Penajam District (Kecamatan Penajam).

== History ==
The region was originally inhabited by several tribes such as Lolo, Adang, and Kali, who each founded small tribal kingdoms. The Paser Kingdom was founded by a combination of several tribes. Smaller tribal kingdoms soon disappeared due to urbanization to the capital of the Paser Kingdom or migration to the interior, which caused these kingdoms' population to drop rapidly.

Since the independence, the region has experienced multiple administrative changes. On 26 June 1959, when the law no. 27 enacted, Paser Regency (then Pasir) was split from Kotabaru Regency, South Kalimantan and transferred to East Kalimantan, based on closer ties with the latter province. At the same time, the Special Region of Kutai was dissolved into Kutai Regency, Samarinda, and Balikpapan. This meant that the current region of Penajam North Paser once belonged to two separate provinces. On 24 April 1969, Penajam along with parts of Samboja, were transferred from Kutai to Balikpapan (and later renamed as Balikpapan Seberang) by gubernatorial decree 55/TH-Pem/SK/1969.

However, 18 years later, on 13 October 1987, Balikpapan Seberang was transferred from Balikpapan to Pasir, and renamed into Penajam. On 11 June 1996, Sepaku and Babulu districts were carved out from parts of Penajam and Waru districts, respectively. The regency's secession from Pasir was advocated by the Northern Region Goes to Regency Success Team, and had urged the central government and the DPR to materialize its formation. Six years later, on 10 April 2002, the northeastern parts of Pasir were finally split out into a new regency, known as Penajam North Paser.

On 26 August 2019, then-president Joko Widodo announced that parts of the future capital Nusantara would be located in parts of Kutai Kartanegara and Penajam North Paser, including the district of Sepaku. However, since Sepaku is to be separated from rest of the regency at some future time, Penajam North Paser will be left with only three districts, notwithstanding the legal requirements for an autonomous regency. Because of this, there are currently plans by the local government to increase the number of districts into five (Sepaku will not be split because its future administrative status remains unclear). Many of their proposed names, however, remain unclear as of October 2026.

== Governance ==
=== Administrative districts ===
Penajam North Paser Regency is divided into four administrative districts (kecamatan), tabulated below with their areas and their populations at the 2010 census and the 2020 census, together with the official estimates as at mid 2025. The table also includes the location of the district administrative centres, the number of administrative villages in each district (totalling 30 rural desa and 24 urban kelurahan), and its postal codes.

Regional code	District name	Area (km^{2})	Population			Administrative centre	Number of villages		Post code
Regional code	District name	Area (km^{2})	Census 2010	Census 2020	Estimate 2025	Administrative centre	Rural	Urban	Post code
64.09.01	Penajam ^{(a)}	1,207.37	66,983	86,040	100,053	Nipah-Nipah	4	19	76141 – 76146
64.09.02	Waru	553.38	15,642	20,084	21,736	Waru	3	1	76284
64.09.03	Babulu	522.75	29,434	36,200	41,255	Babulu Darat	12	-	76285
64.09.04	Sepaku ^{(b)}	1,172.36	30,863	36,357	42,412	Tengin Baru	11	4	76146 – 76149 ^{(c)}
Totals		3,455.86	142,922	178,681	205,456	Penajam	54		

Notes: (a) including fifteen small offshore islands.
(b) includes two small offshore islands - Pulau Jawang and Pulau Sabut.
(c) The town of Maridan has a postcode of 76146, the town of Sepaku and the village of Karang Jinawi share 76148, the town of Mentawir has 76149; the town of Pemaluan and the other ten villages share 76147.

=== Local government and politics ===
The Penajam North Paser Regency is a second-level administrative division equivalent to a city. As a regency, it is headed by a regent who is elected democratically. Heads of districts are appointed directly by the regent on the recommendation of the regency secretary. Executive power lies with the regent and vice regent while legislative function is exercised by the regency's parliament.

== Economy ==
The regency's gross regional product mostly consists of mining, agriculture, and manufacturing sectors. The mining sector contributed to 25.83% of the regency's gross regional product, followed by agriculture with 21.96%, manufacturing with 16.46%, and construction with 11.84%. Other sectors are also present such as trade and wholesale with 9.41%, education sector 3.82%, and administration with 3.68%. The regency experienced an economic contraction of 2.34% in 2020 with the fastest declining sector being manufacturing and mining, while the fastest growing was electricity and gas with growth of 20%.

The main commodity in the regency is palm oil, which in 2021 has a total plantation area of 47,960 hectares. Other commodities include 41,622 tons of rice, 1,700 tons of corn, and 1,562 tons of cassava. There are also 14,451 quintals of cucumber and ginger with 133 tons in 2021. There are livestock in the regency such as beef cattle with 17,191 in 2019, followed by 4,864 goats, and 615 pigs. There are also around 1.9 million of chicken population. Penajam district produced the most chicken meat with output of 487,715 kilograms. Main resources that are mined in the regency is coal.

On hospitality and tourism sector, there are 17 hotels registered in the regency as of 2020. According to the regency government, there are 24 tourist spots identified in the regency. In 2020, the regency was visited by 19,539 visitors from which 9,262 are visiting the tourist spots. There are also 41 registered restaurants in the regency as of 2020.

There are total 257 registered cooperatives in the regency, most of which are located in Penajam.

== Infrastructure ==
=== Education ===
As of 2021, the regency has 79 kindergartens, 109 elementary schools, 42 junior highschools, and 13 senior highschools. In addition, there are 10 vocational highschools in the regency as of 2021. The regency does not have a higher education institutions as of 2021, but there are plans to construct a university in town of Penajam.

=== Health ===
The regency has one hospital, 10 polyclinics, 54 puskesmas, 41 pharmacies, in addition to 10 medical clinics and 273 healthcare posts. The main and only hospital in the regency is Ratu Aji Putri Botung Regional Hospital, located in town of Penajam. The hospital is public and operated by the regency government. It was classified as C-class by Ministry of Health.

=== Transportation ===
The regency has total road length of 1,371 kilometers as of 2021, most of which are maintained by regency government. Around 347 kilometers are paved with asphalt, 566 kilometers have gravel surface, while the rest are other surfaces such as soil. More than half of the road were considered in good condition as of 2021 by Ministry of Public Works and Housing. The town of Penajam in the regency has several ports such as Buluminung Port which supports transportation to Buluminung Industrial Zone. There are smaller ports around the regency which support speed boats and ferries mostly from Balikpapan.

The regency itself has no airport. The closest airports however are Sultan Aji Muhammad Sulaiman Sepinggan International Airport in Balikpapan and Aji Pangeran Tumenggung Pranoto International Airport in Samarinda, both are international airports. There are bus routes served by Perum DAMRI to Balikpapan, Samarinda, and town of Tanah Grogot. The regency's main bus terminal located on town of Penajam.

As with other places in Indonesia, there are angkot around the regency especially in the town of Penajam. Other than that, the regency also has presence of online ride-hailing services. The online ride-hailing services are available in Penajam, Waru, and Babulu districts.

=== Others ===
The regency has total 523 mosques, 48 Protestant churches, and 9 Catholic churches. The regency has regional library operated by regency government, located in town of Penajam. It is a relatively new library, built on late 2021. There are total 132 base transceiver station in the regency as of 2021 to support communication in the region, most of which are operated by private companies.

There's one sport stadium located in town of Penajam, named Benuo Taka Stadium.
