= HNLMS Orion =

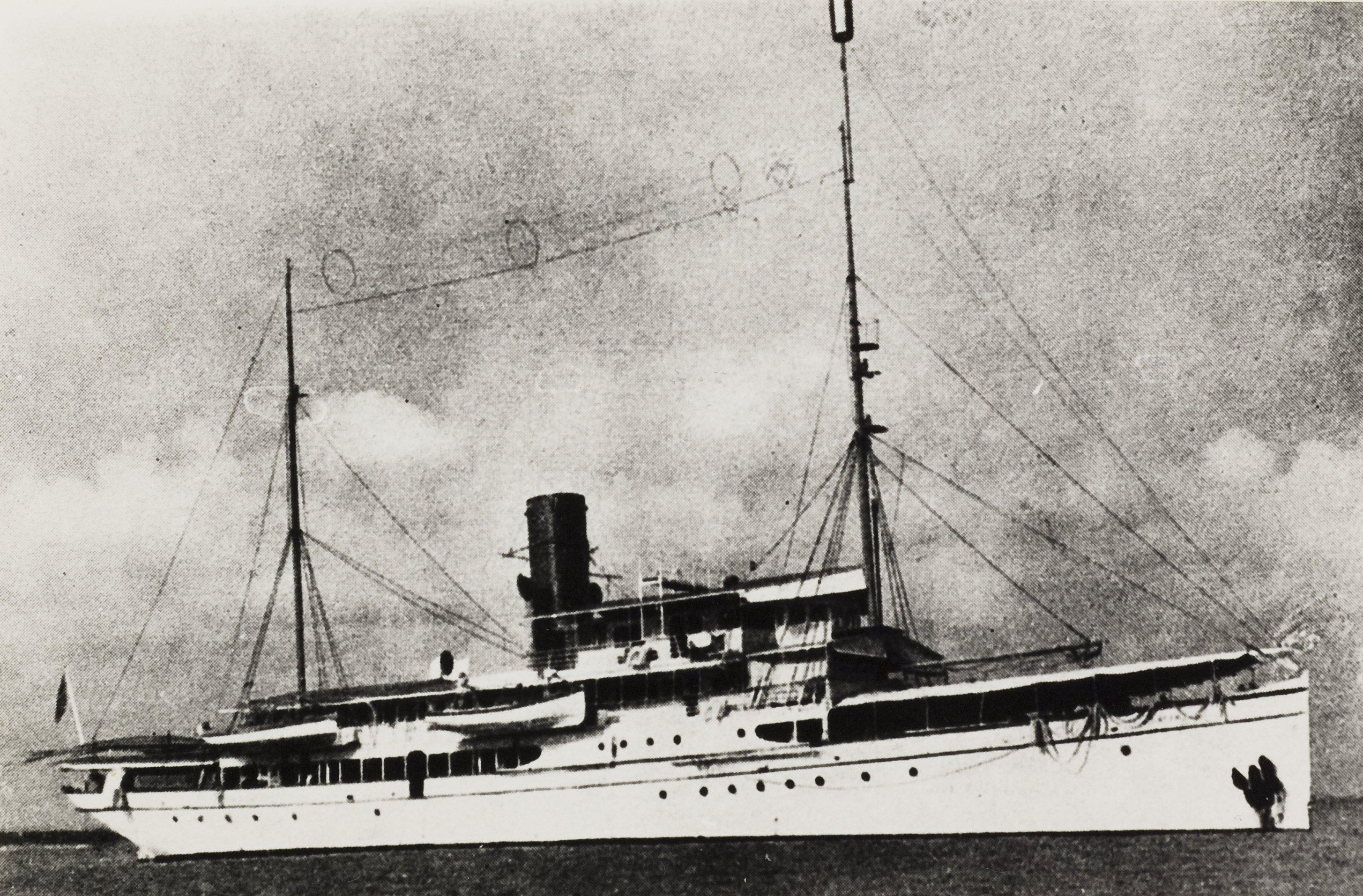
- Orion

History

Netherlands
- Name: Orion
- Operator: Dienst der bebakening en kustverlichting; Government Navy
- Ordered: 1911
- Builder: Marine Etablissement te Soerabaja
- Launched: 9 March 1912
- Commissioned: 1 August 1912
- Fate: Sunk on 22 January 1942 by HNLMS K XVIII in the Bay of Balikpapan

General characteristics
- Type: Steamship
- Displacement: 1,062 t (1,045 long tons)
- Length: 55.92 m (183 ft 6 in)
- Beam: 9.03 m (29 ft 8 in)
- Draught: 3.76 m (12 ft 4 in)
- Propulsion: 1,380 hp (1,030 kW); 2 x Water pipe boilers
- Speed: 14 knots (26 km/h; 16 mph)
- Capacity: 240 m^{3} (8,500 cu ft) fuel storage; 152 m^{3} (5,400 cu ft) cargo space
- Crew: 71

HNLMS Orion was a steamship of the Dienst der bebakening en kustverlichting. The ship was built in the Dutch East Indies and served as an inspection vessel (Dutch: inspectievaartuig). Later the ship was rebuilt and transferred to the Government Navy, which used it as a hydrographic survey vessel.

== Design and construction ==
Orion was ordered in 1911 at the Marine Etablissement te Soerabaja in the Dutch East Indies. The ship was launched on 9 March 1912 and commissioned into the Dienst der bebakening en kustverlichting on 1 August 1912. The Dutch engineer R.G. Leegstra was responsible for the design of Orion. The cost of building Orion was estimated at 271.700 Dutch guilders.

Orion was frequently repaired throughout its career because of various defects.

== Service history ==
In 1916 Orion was used to experiment with a different type of coal by testing if it could be used to power steam boilers.

=== Government Navy ===
On 1 October 1920 Orion was taken out of service of the Dienst der bebakening en kustverlichting and rebuilt at the Marine Etablissement te Soerabaja. After being rebuilt the ship was transferred to the Government Navy and stationed in 1921 at Tandjong Priok.

In 1924 two ship's boats of the Orion collapsed near Koeaia Peudada.

In 1926 Orion was extensively repaired at the Droogdok Maatschappij Tandjong Priok.

In December 1929 Orion searched in the Java Sea for a reef that had been spotted a month earlier by a captain of the KPM. During the search the ship was joined by two Dornier Do J Wal flying boats.

In 1934 the commander of the Orion, Ph.A.C.Th. Knijff, was awarded the De Ruyter Medal for his service. Under his command a better waterway had been found near Samarinda and he successfully used a new method to do hydrographic research.

==== Second World War ====
At the start of the Second World War Orion had already been decommissioned and was used as a light ship at Balikpapan.

On 22 January 1942 Orion was sunk by the Dutch submarine K XVIII in the Bay of Balikpapan to make access to Balikpapan more difficult for the invading Japanese.
