= West Balikpapan =

West Balikpapan Kecamatan Balikpapan Barat
- District
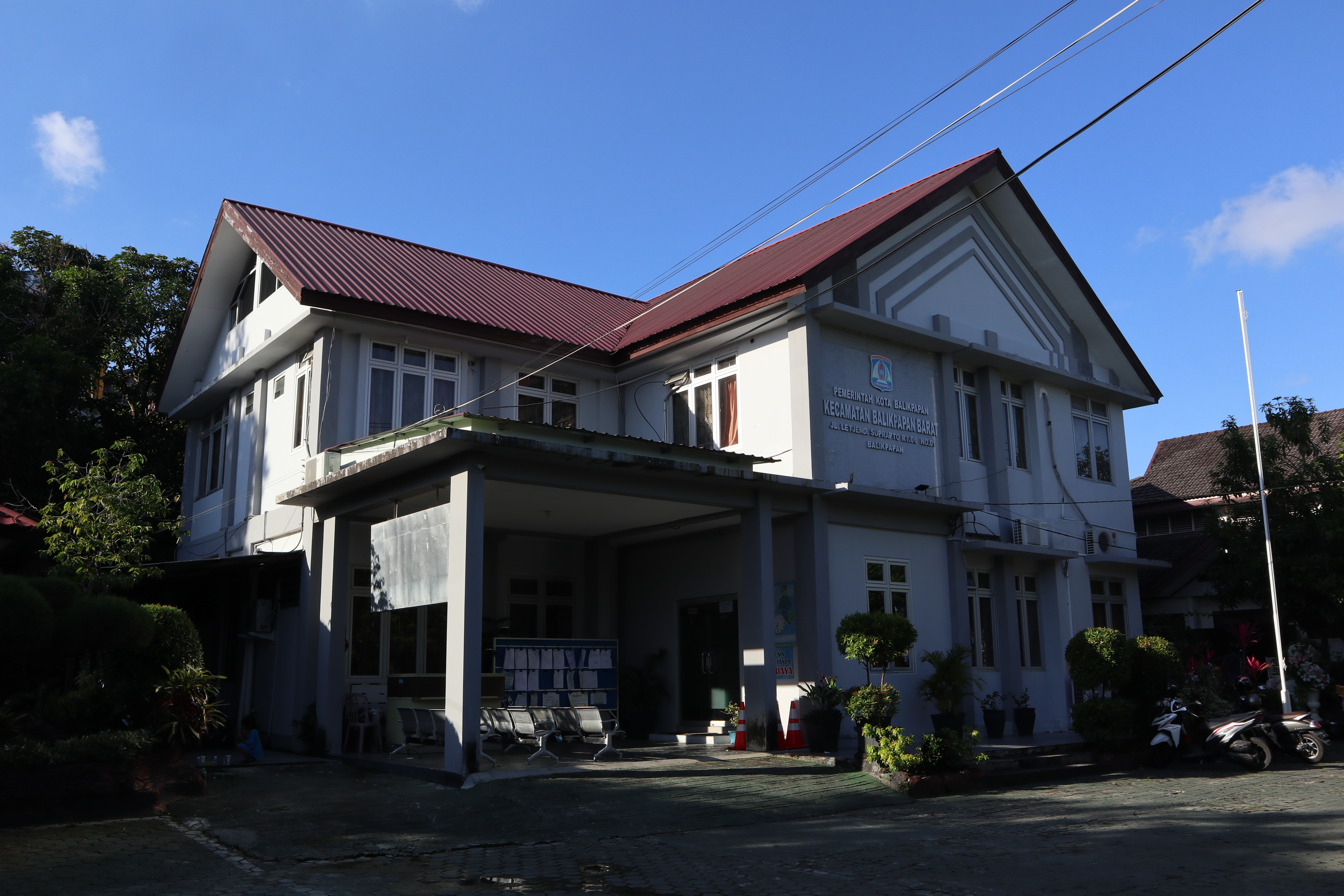
- Government office of West Balikpapan districts

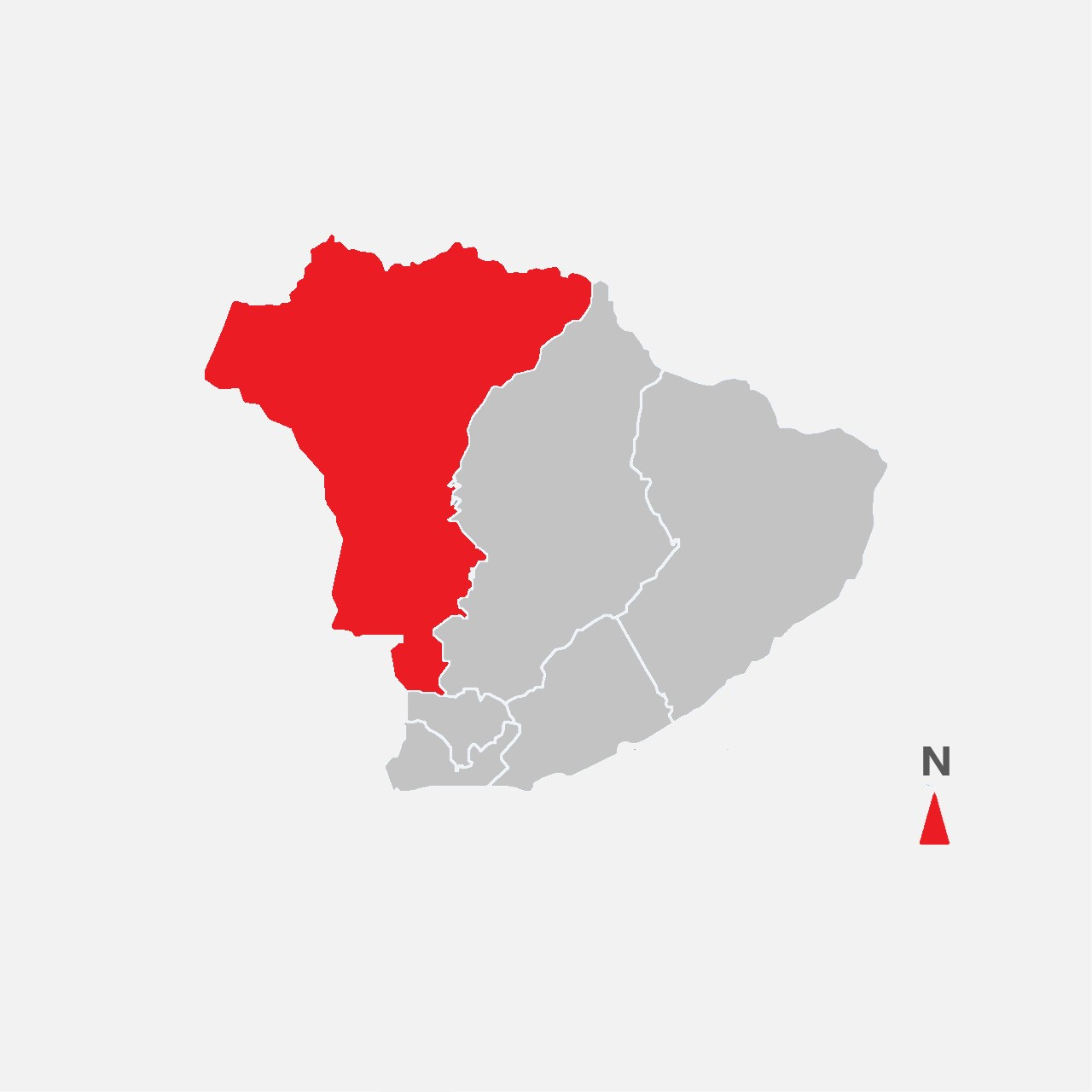
- Location of West Balikpapan district in Balikpapan
- Interactive map of West Balikpapan district
- Coordinates: 1.141816°S 116.839349°E
- Country: Indonesia
- Province: East Kalimantan
- City: Balikpapan
- Administrative subdistricts: 6

Government
  - District mayor: Muhammad Idris

Area
  - Total: 179.952 km^{2} (69.480 sq mi)

Population (2018)(from BPS)
  - Total: 96,932
  - Density: 538.65/km^{2} (1,395.1/sq mi)
- Time zone: GMT +8
- Website: Official website (in Indonesia)

West Balikpapan is a district in the city of Balikpapan, East Kalimantan, Indonesia. The area is 37.49 km^{2} in water and on land an area of 179.952 km^{2} or about 35.75% of Balikpapan area. West Balikpapan is bordered by Kutai Kartanegara Regency to the North, by North Balikpapan to the North-East, by Central Balikpapan to the East-South, and Balikpapan Bay to the South-West.

== Demographics ==
The majority of the population in district are migrants from various regions such as Sulawesi (Buginese, Makassar), Banjarmasin, Java and Madura Island.

== Conservation ==
With a quarter of the area above the water, the district has many places on conservative land including Mangroves forest around Balikpapan Bay and the Wain River.

== Economics ==
=== Marketplace ===
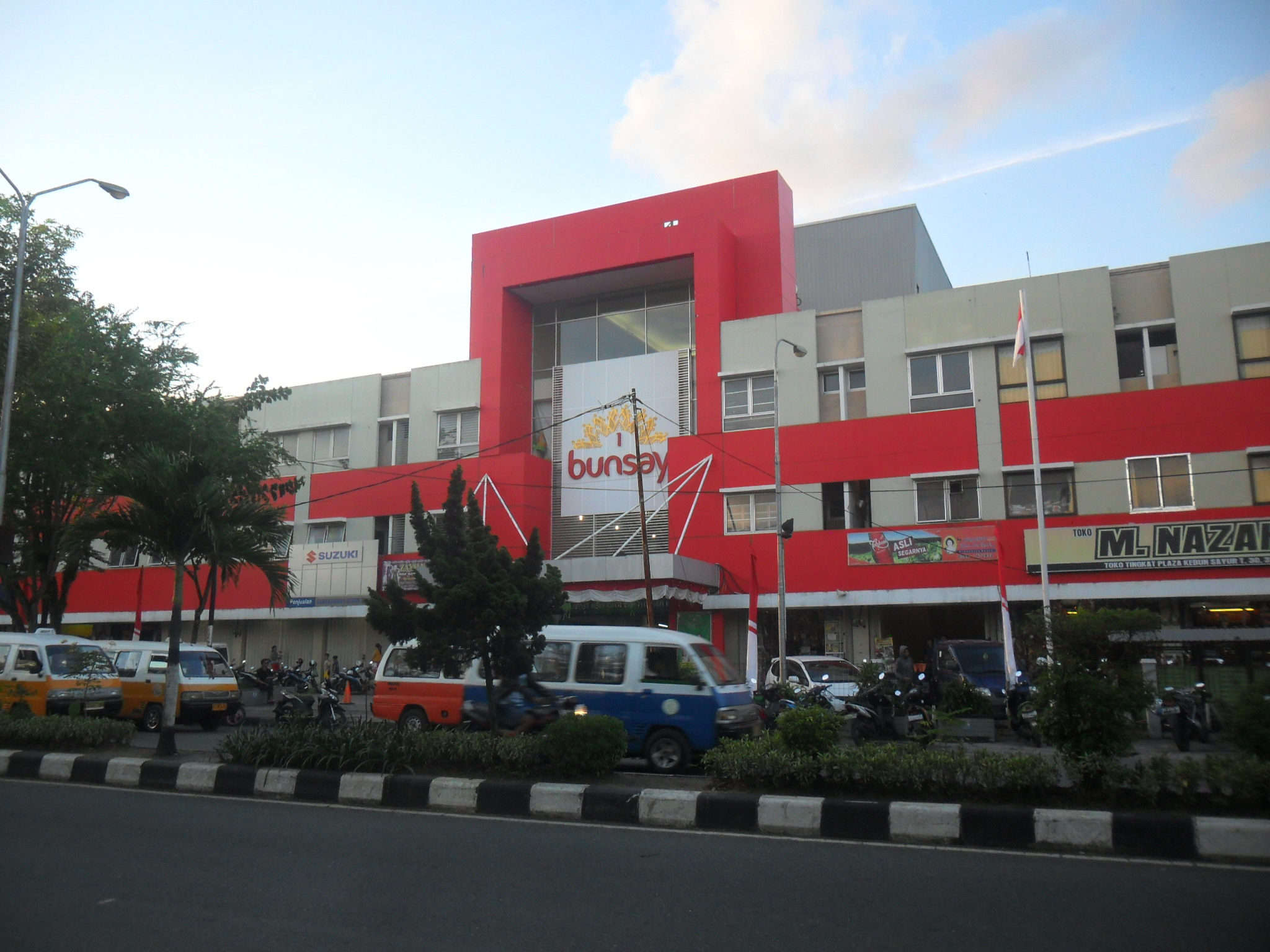
Bunsay Plaza

Some people work in the district as traders and sell around the Pandan Sari area. There are several popular marketplaces are Pandan Sari market, Impres Market, and Bunsay Plaza.

=== Manufactures ===
This district is one of the most important oil and natural gas producing areas in West Balikpapan is ChevronTexaco. Various well-known manufacturing companies are operating, among them MASA, Petrosea, and PJB UBJOM. In addition, Kariangau subdistrict is the largest industrial warehousing center in Balikpapan.

== Government ==
The military once maintained a Malaysia Liaison Officer by the Malaysian Army was operated in Baru Ilir subdistrict. Another the public government are office Police Sector in Marga Sari subdistrict, in the Baru Ilir district there are Office District, Religious Affairs office and One-Stop One-Stop Administrative System (SAMSAT) support officer in Bunsay Plaza. There several Community Health Centers scattered in Marga Sari, Sidomulyo, Baru Ilir, Margo Mulyo, Kariangau, Kampung Baru Tengah and Baru Ulu.

== Transport ==
Kampung Baru Seaport managed by Indonesia Port Corporations IV (Pelindo IV) is a seaport that serves shipping routes to and from several sub-districts in Penajam North Paser Regency, East Kalimantan. Passengers will see more fast boats with a capacity of six passengers compared to large ships, although there are also several large ships with a capacity of 200 passengers berthed.

== Administrative divisions ==
West Balikpapan is divided into 6 administrative subdistricts:

Map of West Balikpapan's subdistricts
#	Name subdistricts (Kelurahan)	Area (km^{2})
1	Baru Ilir	0.589
2	Baru Tengah	0.570
3	Baru Ulu	0.955
4	Kariangau	175.328
5	Margomulyo	1.845
6	Marga Sari	0.665
Total		179.952
