= Balikpapan massacre =

1942 massacre of Dutch prisoners by Japan

The Balikpapan Massacre involved the killing of 78 unarmed Dutch civilians and prisoners of war by the Japanese 56th Division near the seaport city of Balikpapan on 24 February 1942.

== Events ==
On 20 January 1942, a small vessel was spotted heading for Balikpapan by the Royal Netherlands East Indies Army Air Force. A flying boat landed near the vessel, which was found to contain two captains of the Royal Netherlands East Indies Army. The two men had been captured and spared the massacre of 215 Dutch POWs at Tarakan, whose oilfields had been destroyed prior to Japanese capture. Aiming to prevent a similar fate of the oilfields at Balikpapan, they carried an ultimatum on behalf of the Japanese stating that all Dutchmen would be summarily executed should the Balikpapan oilfields be destroyed. The Japanese ultimatum had the opposite effect, however, as the commanding officer, Lieutenant Colonel C. van den Hoogeband, immediately ordered demolition teams to destroy the Balikpapan oilfields.

On the night of 23 January and the morning of 24 January, Japanese units landed near Balikpapan, meeting no opposition as the Dutch soldiers had been ordered to try to escape the area. Realizing the oil fields had been destroyed, the Japanese began rounding up the remaining Dutchmen, which, apart from 62 Dutch POWs, included two civil servants, a police inspector, a medical officer, eight patients from Balikpapan hospital and three priests. On February 23, all captives were taken to the beach, where the two civil servants were beheaded, and the remainder were chased into the sea, where they were all shot one at a time over a period of approximately two hours. Indonesians from neighboring villages had been brought in to watch the executions.

== See also ==
- Dutch East Indies campaign
- Japanese war crimes
- Laha massacre
