= Balikpapan =

City in East Kalimantan, Indonesia

- City
- City of Balikpapan; Kota Balikpapan
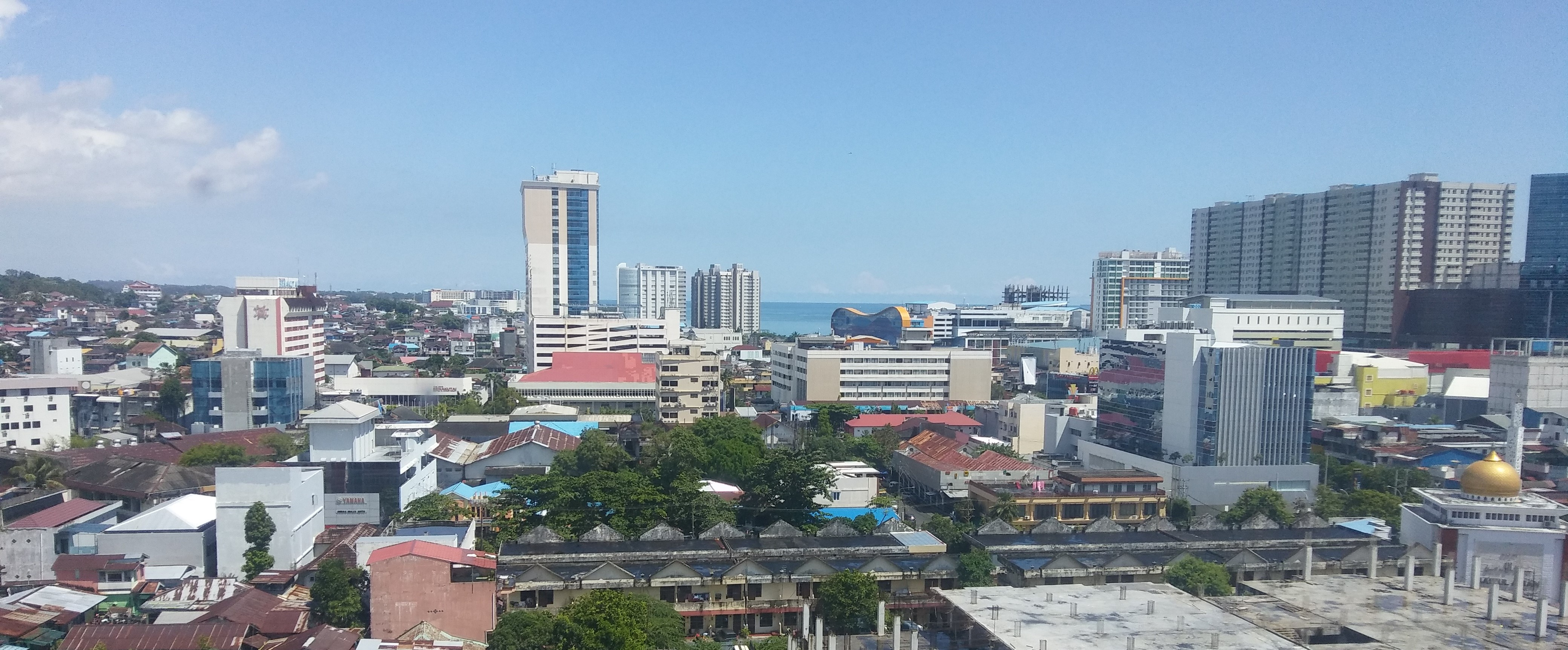
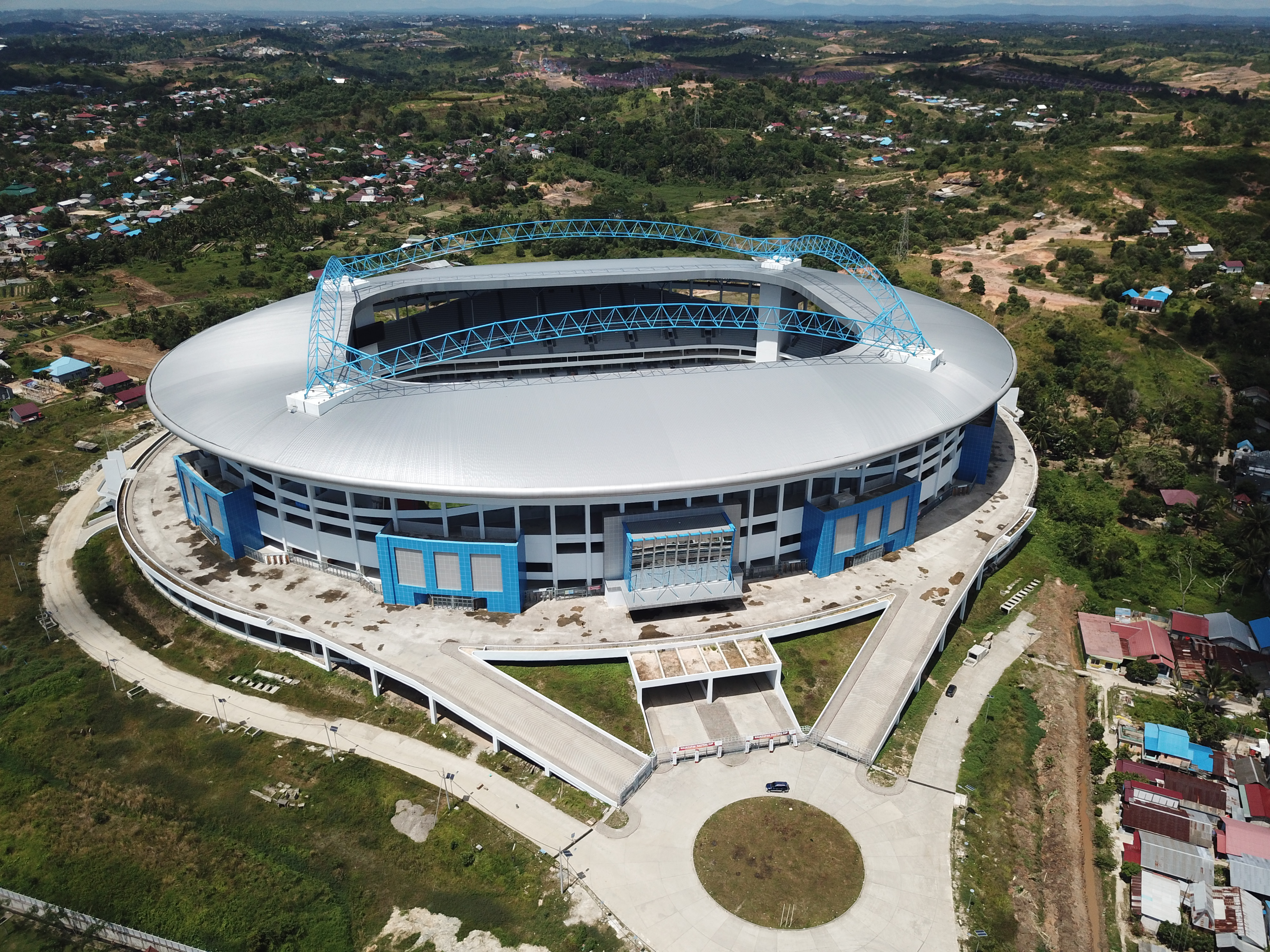
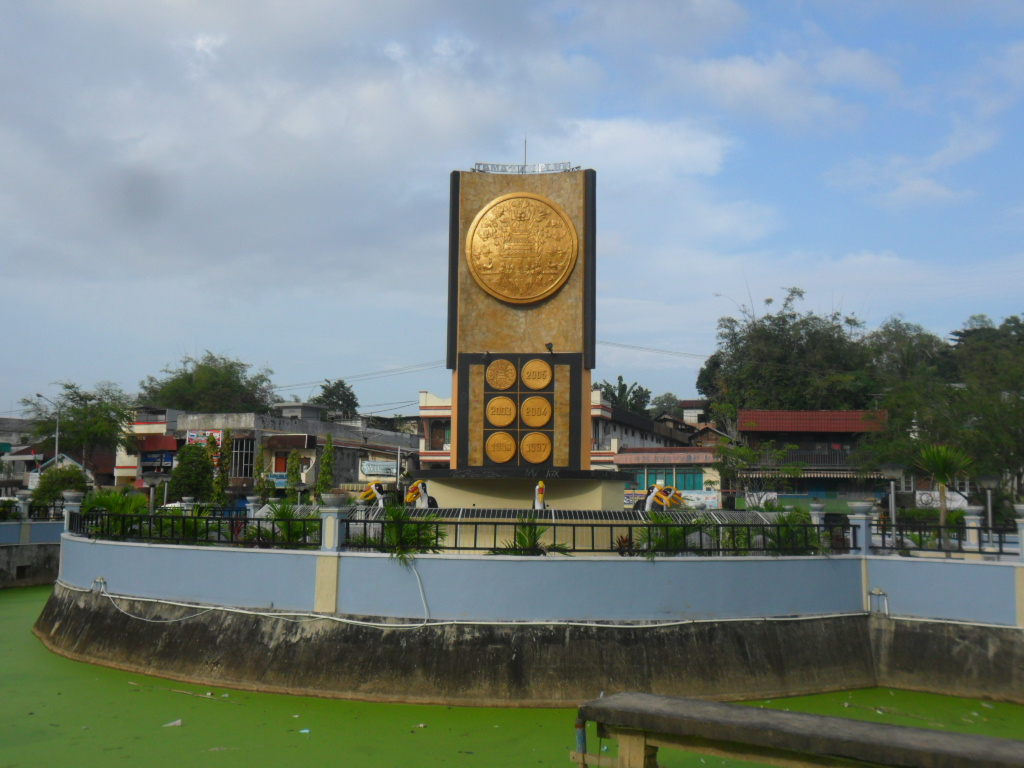
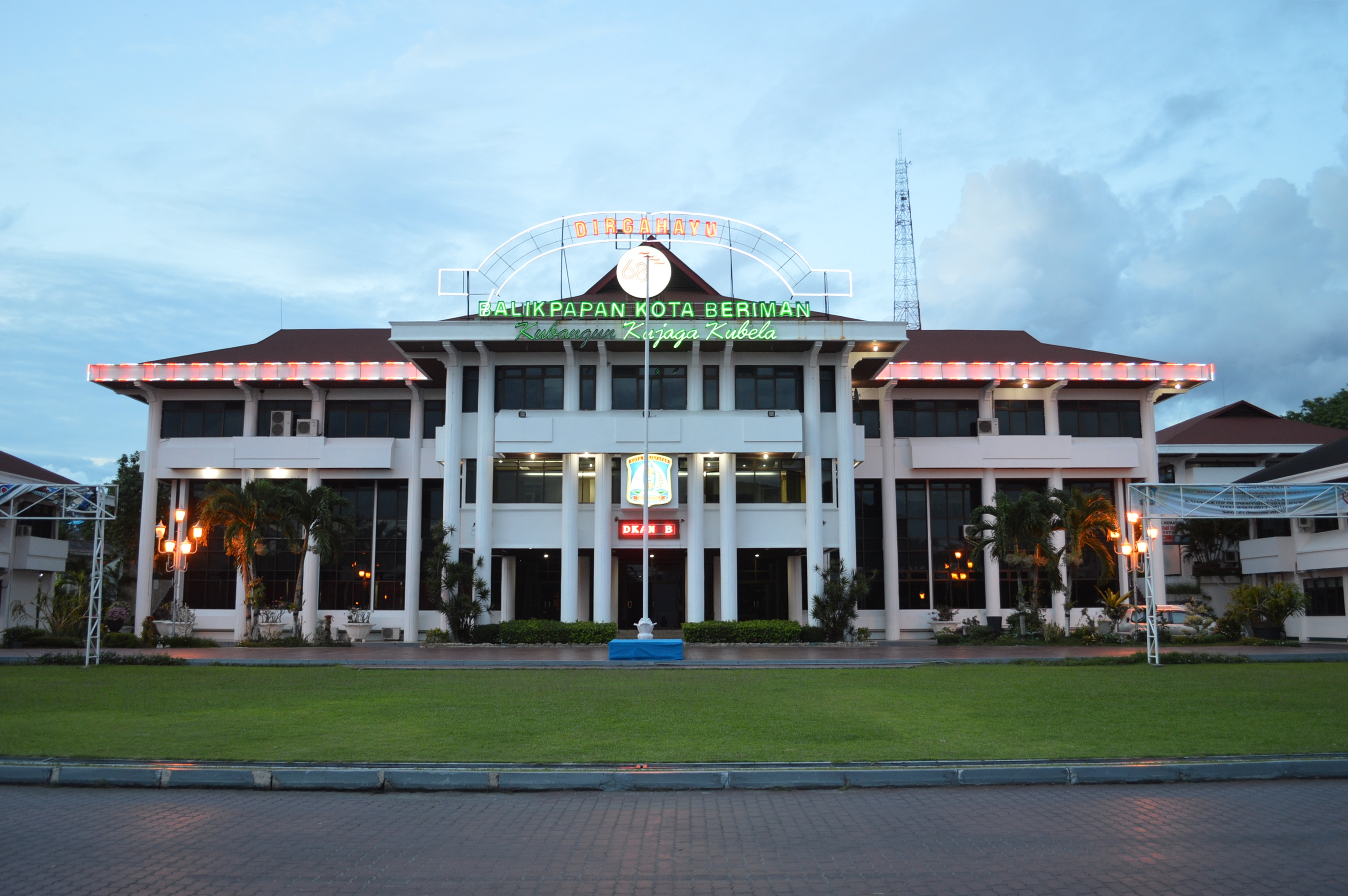
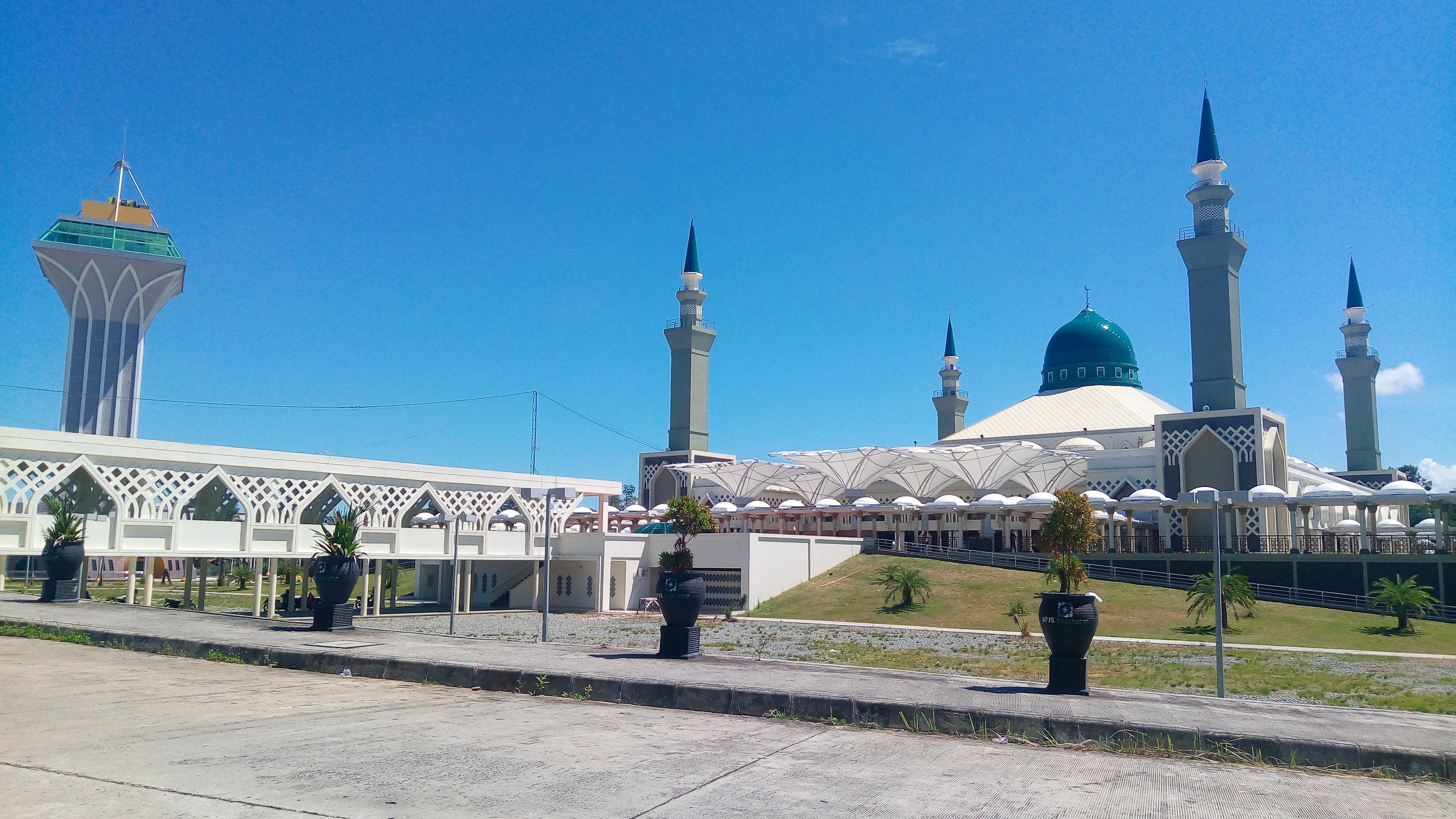
- Downtown Balikpapan Batakan Stadium Adipura monument Mayoral Office Balikpapan Islamic Center

- Flag Coat of arms
- Etymology: Balik (Behind) and Papan (Plank)
- Nicknames: Kota Minyak "City of Oil"
- Motto(s): Gawi Manuntung Waja Sampai Kaputing (Banjar) "Hard Work until Finish"
- Interactive map of Balikpapan
- Location in Kalimantan and Indonesia Balikpapan (Indonesia)
- Coordinates: 1°16′36.5″S 116°49′39.8″E
- Country: Indonesia
- Province: East Kalimantan
- Established: 10 February 1897

Government
  - Mayor: Rahmad Mas'ud (Golkar)
  - Vice Mayor: Bagus Susetyo
  - Legislature: Balikpapan City Regional House of Representatives (DPRD)

Area
  - Total: 503.3 km^{2} (194.3 sq mi)
- Elevation: 52 m (171 ft)

Population (mid 2024 estimate)
  - Total: 757,418
  - Density: 1,505/km^{2} (3,898/sq mi)
- Time zone: UTC+8 (WITA)
- Postal Code: List: 76111, 76112, 76113, 76114, 76115, 76116, 76117, 76118, 76119, 76121, 76122, 76123, 76124, 76125, 76126, 76127, 76128, 76129, 76131, 76132, 76133, 76134, 76136
- Area code: (+62) 542
- Vehicle registration: KT
- HDI (2019): ▲0.801 (Very High)
- Airport: Sultan Aji Muhammad Sulaiman Sepinggan International Airport
- Website: balikpapan.go.id

Balikpapan is a seaport city in East Kalimantan, Indonesia. Located on the east coast of the island of Borneo, the city is the financial center of Kalimantan. With a population of 688,318 according to the 2020 census, and an official estimate of 757,418 as at mid 2023 (comprising 387,112 males and 370,206 females), Balikpapan is the second most populous city in East Kalimantan, after Samarinda.

Balikpapan is the largest city in Kalimantan by GDP, with a 2016 estimate of Rp 73.18 trillion. The city is served by Sultan Aji Muhammad Sulaiman Sepinggan Airport. The Port of Semayang was the second busiest seaport in East Kalimantan, after that in Samarinda.

Balikpapan was originally a fishing village built by Buginese people in the 19th century. The first oil drilling began in Balikpapan on 10 February 1897, which was later set as the anniversary of the city. In 1899, the Dutch East Indies colonial administration granted a township status to Balikpapan. In 1907, Bataafsche Petroleum Maatschappij (BPM) made the city as its headquarters and imported skilled laborers, engineers, and managers from overseas. Subsequently, numerous multi-national companies came to Balikpapan to invest in the oil industry. This resulted in the economic boom of Balikpapan and attracted many migrants and expatriates.

During World War II, the Empire of Japan occupied the city in 1942, as part of the occupation of the Dutch East Indies, and it was bombed by the Allies in the first Balikpapan Battle in 1942 and second battle in 1945. The battles impacted critical infrastructure, including the oil refinery stations and seaport which were completely burned to the ground. Upon Indonesia's independence, BPM extended its activities in Balikpapan until 1965 when Pertamina, the Indonesian state-owned oil company, took control over the ownership of BPM and its oil exploration activities.

== Etymology and nicknames ==
In Indonesian, balik can mean " come back" or "behind", while papan can mean "board" or "plank of wood". There are several popular stories and legends explaining the origin of Balikpapan:

- The 10 pieces of board returned to Jenebora from the 1,000 pieces requested by the Sultan of Kutai as donations of building materials for the construction of the New Kutai Palace. The ten boards that were returned were referred to by the people of Kutai as Balikpapan Tu. So that the area along Balikpapan Bay, precisely in Jenebora is called Balikpapan.
- Balik people (the indigenous people of Balikpapan) are the descendants of grandfather and grandmother named Kayun Kuleng and Papan Ayun. So that the area along Balikpapan Bay by its descendants is called Kuleng-Papan or means Balikpapan (in Paser, Kuleng means Balik).
- Other legends link the origin of Balikpapan to a princess who was released by her father a king who did not want his daughter to fall into the hands of the enemy. The daughter who was still a toddler was tied up on several pieces of board in a state of lying. Because she was carried away and hit by waves, the board was reversed. When the board was stranded on the shore found by a fisherman and so it turned out that there was a daughter who was still bound. It is said that the princess was named Putri Petung who came from the Kingdom of Sand. So that the area where it was found was called Balikpapan.

From several older documents, the city was also spelt as Billipapan and Balikkappan.

The city has had several nicknames throughout its history such as the Oil City, City of Believers (Kota Beriman, which is an acronym of: BERsih (clean), Indah (magnificent), dan nyaMAN (comfortable)).

== History ==
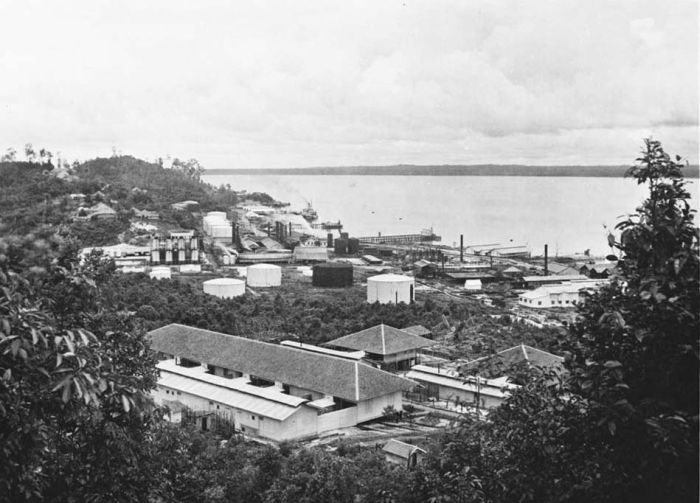
Bataafsche Petroleum Maatschappij oil refinery, 1910s

Before the oil boom of the early 1900s, Balikpapan was an isolated Bugis fishing village. Balikpapan's toponym (balik = "behind" and papan = "plank") is from a folk story in which a local king threw his newborn daughter into the sea to protect her from his enemies. The baby was tied beneath some planks that were discovered by a fisherman. An alternative story is that, at the time of the Kutai sultanate, Sultan Muhammad Idris sent 1000 planks to aid the Paser Kingdom to build a new palace. The planks were shipped from Kutai to Paser along the Borneo shoreline by roping all the planks together. 10 out of the 1000 planks that were originally shipped resurfaced in a place currently called Balikpapan.

=== Oil development ===
On 10 February 1897, a small refinery company, Mathilda, began the first oil drilling. Building of roads, wharves, warehouses, offices, barracks, and bungalows started when the Dutch oil company Bataafsche Petroleum Maatschappij (BPM) arrived in the area.

=== Second World War ===
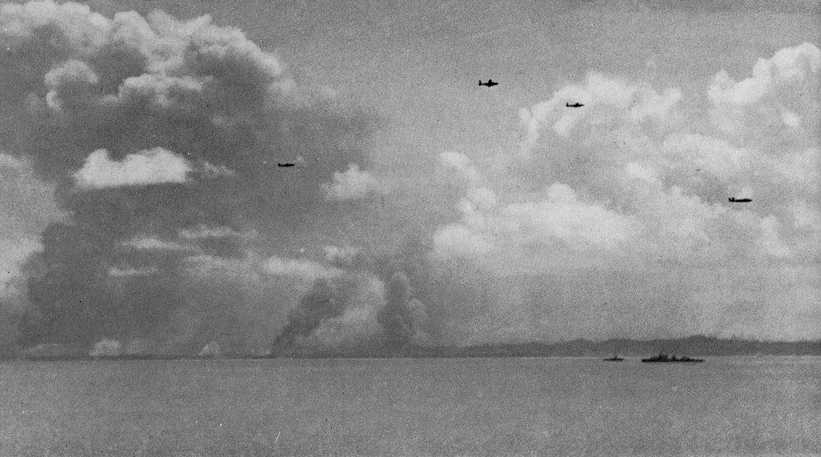
Battle of Balikpapan (1945)

On 24 January 1942, a Japanese invasion convoy arrived at Balikpapan and was attacked by four United States Navy destroyers that sank three Japanese transports. The Japanese army landed and met with no opposition by the Dutch troops, which had been ordered to evacuate after destroying the oil installations. In response to this, the Japanese massacred 78 Dutch POWs and civilians.

Royal Australian Air Force (RAAF) intelligence determined that half of all lubricating oils used by the Japanese military and 60 percent of all their aviation fuel came from refineries in Balikpapan, and it was therefore an extremely important target. The American 380th Bombardment Group under the command of the RAAF, including the famous B-24 Liberator Shady Lady, attacked the oil refineries in August 1943 from Darwin, Australia. Amazingly, there were no aircraft losses, despite the crash landing and subsequent repair of the Shady Lady.

In September and October 1944, the 5th and 13th Air Forces under the command of General George Kenney launched a series of five raids from Morotai and Noemfoor Islands. Kenney was a strong advocate for using the powerful B-29 Superfortress for this raid but was forced to use the B-24 Liberator instead. Unbeknownst to the Allied forces, the Japanese Air Force had conserved many of its dwindling numbers of fighters to protect the important oil refineries. The first two raids did not have fighter cover and suffered severe losses.

The 1945 Battle of Balikpapan concluded the Borneo campaign and Allied forces took control of Borneo island. Extensive wartime damage curtailed almost all oil production in the area until Royal Dutch Shell completed major repairs in 1950.

=== CIA air raid ===
In 1958, the CIA attacked Balikpapan and stopped oil exports. The US was running a CIA covert mission to undermine President Sukarno's government by supporting right-wing rebels in Indonesia. The CIA, Taiwan and the Philippines had provided the Permesta rebels in North Sulawesi with an insurgent air force, the Angkatan Udara Revolusioner (AUREV). On 28 April 1958, a CIA pilot, William H. Beale, flying a B-26 Invader bomber aircraft that was painted black and showing no markings, dropped 500 pounds (230 kilograms) of four bombs on Balikpapan. The first damaged the runway at Sultan Aji Muhammad Sulaiman Airport, the second set the British oil tanker SS San Flaviano on fire and sank her and the third bounced off the British tanker MV Daronia without exploding. Beale's fourth bomb set on fire and sank the Indonesian Navy Bathurst-class corvette KRI Hang Tuah, killing 18 crew and wounding 28. Before attacking Hang Tuah, Beale also machine-gunned the oil pipes to Shell's wharf.

The CIA had orders to attack unarmed foreign merchant ships in order to drive foreign trade away from Indonesia and weaken its economy, with the intention of undermining Sukarno's government. The day before attacking Balikpapan, Beale had also damaged a Shell complex at Ambon, Maluku. His Balikpapan raid succeeded in persuading Shell to suspend tanker services from Balikpapan and withdraw shore-based wives and families to Singapore. However, on 18 May Indonesian naval and air forces off Ambon Island shot down an AUREV B-26 and captured its CIA pilot, Allen Pope. The US immediately withdrew support for Permesta, whose rebellion rapidly diminished thereafter.

=== Subsequent history ===
Shell continued operating in the area until Indonesian state-owned Pertamina took it over in 1965. Lacking technology, skilled manpower, and capital to explore the petroleum region, Pertamina sublet petroleum concession contracts to multinational companies in the 1970s.

With the only oil refinery site in the region, Balikpapan emerged as a revitalized center of petroleum production. Pertamina opened its East Borneo headquarters in the city, followed by branch offices established by other international oil companies. Hundreds of laborers from Indonesia, along with skilled expatriates who served as managers and engineers, flocked into the city.

== Geography ==
=== Topography ===
Topography of Balikpapan is generally hilly (85%), with only small areas of flat land (15%), mostly along the coast and surrounding the hilly areas. The hills are less than 100 meters (330 feet) higher than the adjacent valleys. The altitude of Balikpapan ranges from 0 to 80 meters (260 feet) above sea level. The city proper itself is located on eastern side of Bay of Balikpapan.

Most of the soil in Balikpapan contains yellow-reddish podsolic soil and alluvial and quartz sand, making it extremely prone to erosion.

=== Climate ===
Balikpapan features a tropical rainforest climate (Köppen: Af) as there is no real dry season in Balikpapan. The city sees an average of 2,400 millimeters (94 inches) of rain per year. Balikpapan generally shows little variation in weather throughout the course of the year. The city does not have significantly wetter and drier periods of the year and average temperatures are nearly identical throughout the course of the year, averaging about 26 to 27 degrees Celsius (79–81 degrees Fahrenheit) throughout the year.

Climate data for Balikpapan (Sultan Aji Muhammad Sulaiman Sepinggan Airport) (1991–2020 normals, extremes 1999–2013)
Month	Jan	Feb	Mar	Apr	May	Jun	Jul	Aug	Sep	Oct	Nov	Dec	Year
Mean daily maximum °C (°F)	31.3 (88.3)	31.5 (88.7)	31.7 (89.1)	31.1 (88.0)	31.1 (88.0)	30.5 (86.9)	30.0 (86.0)	30.4 (86.7)	30.8 (87.4)	31.3 (88.3)	31.4 (88.5)	31.4 (88.5)	31.0 (87.9)
Daily mean °C (°F)	27.1 (80.8)	27.2 (81.0)	27.3 (81.1)	27.5 (81.5)	27.9 (82.2)	27.5 (81.5)	27.3 (81.1)	27.5 (81.5)	27.8 (82.0)	27.8 (82.0)	27.6 (81.7)	27.3 (81.1)	27.5 (81.5)
Mean daily minimum °C (°F)	24.3 (75.7)	24.3 (75.7)	24.5 (76.1)	24.7 (76.5)	25.0 (77.0)	24.7 (76.5)	24.6 (76.3)	24.8 (76.6)	24.9 (76.8)	25.0 (77.0)	24.7 (76.5)	24.5 (76.1)	24.7 (76.4)
Average precipitation mm (inches)	195.1 (7.68)	209.7 (8.26)	240.4 (9.46)	233.6 (9.20)	239.6 (9.43)	289.0 (11.38)	245.0 (9.65)	167.8 (6.61)	148.8 (5.86)	169.0 (6.65)	210.3 (8.28)	251.3 (9.89)	2,599.6 (102.35)
Average precipitation days	14.6	12.7	14.3	15.1	14.6	15.8	13.8	10.1	9.2	11.6	13.6	16.3	161.7
Mean daily sunshine hours	4.0	5.0	6.0	7.0	7.0	7.0	7.0	8.0	7.0	7.0	7.0	5.0	6.4
Source 1: Starlings Roost Weather
Source 2: Danish Meteorological Institute (humidity) Weather Atlas (sunshine data)

== Ecology ==
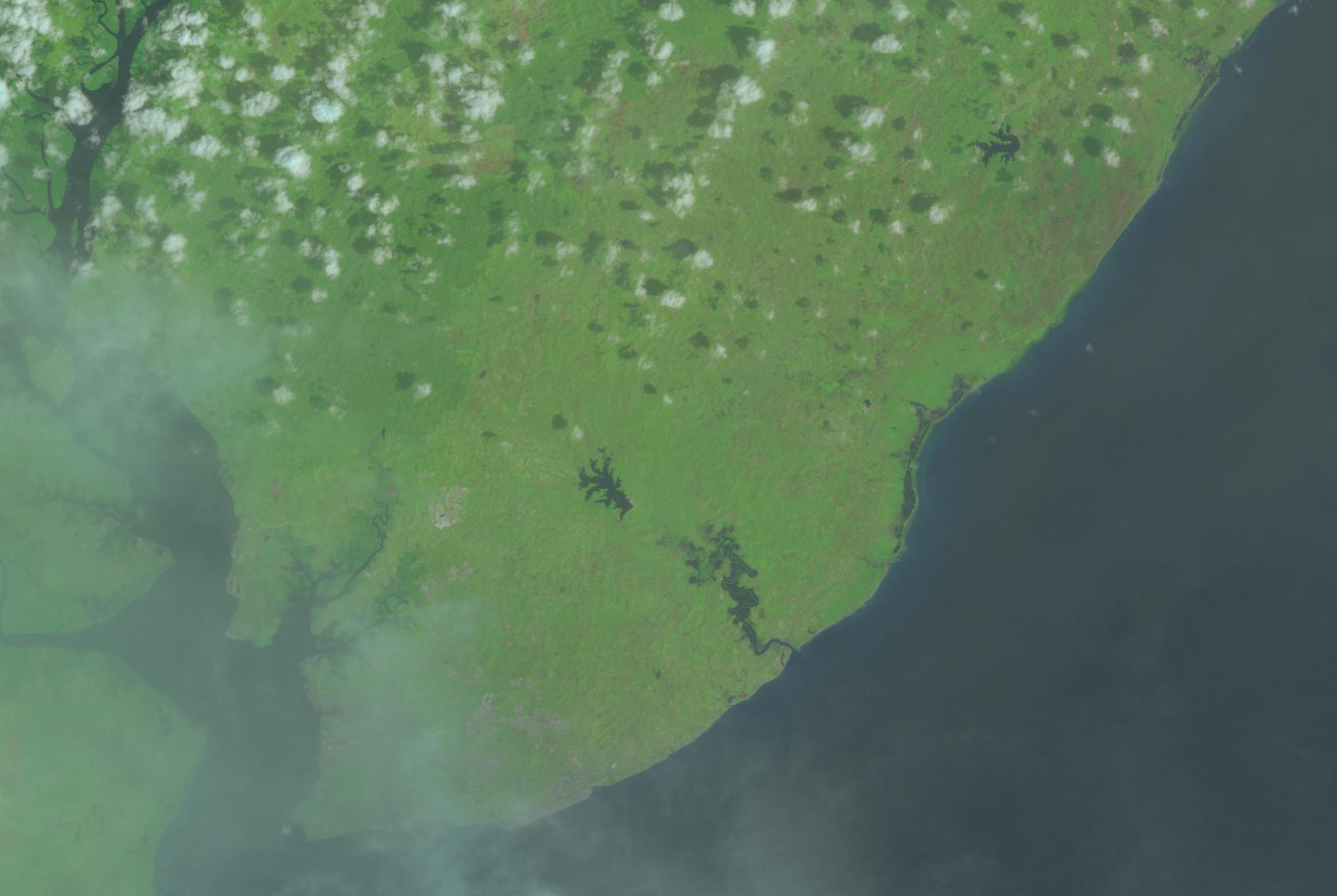
1995

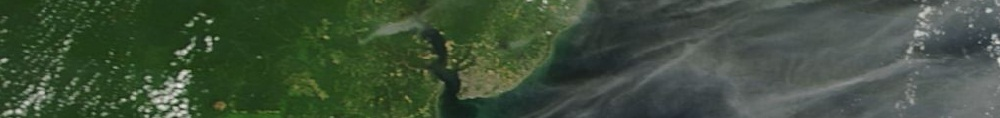
2013

NASA satellite observation of Balikpapan deforestation

In Wain River Protection Forest, which is the main water catchment area and habitat for endangered species of Borneo, the community begins to encroach on how to burn it so that during the dry season some areas become barren and damage 40%. The area of Wain River forest reaches 10,000 hectares (25,000 acres), slowly but surely continues to decrease, leaving 9,000 hectares (22,000 acres) with forest conditions that are still good at only 63 percents. Residents around looked for wood to cook in the forest even though the surrounding area had been lined with wire.

Previously between 2000 and 2001, illegal logging occurred in 10 to 15 points in the Wain River forest, and in 2009 this forest was hit by a fire along with the Manggar River forest which made 15 hectares (37 acres) of forest area engulfed in fire. The threat of coal mining from the surrounding area which provides mining permits such as Paser and Kutai Kartanegara also disrupts the border ecosystem of Wain River forest.

The urban forest in Telagasari, which was inaugurated in 1996 with an area of 29.4 hectares (73 acres), has now shrunk to just around 8 hectares (20 acres). The forest in the middle of this city has been surrounded by residential areas.

The protected forest of the Manggar River also suffered considerable damage, which is around 60%. The reservoirs in this forest are also threatened because coal mining fields and brick mills were set up so close that there was siltation of reservoir water. The majority of those who founded it were even known to be immigrant communities. In addition, the construction of the Samarinda-Balikpapan toll road planned by the East Kalimantan government which divides the forest for 8 kilometers across the reservoir could damage the quality of the clean water reserve in Balikpapan.

Forest damage resulted in Balikpapan being easily hit by floods and landslides when it was hit by heavy rains. Clean water supply is also decreasing because water absorption is narrowing, erosion is easily to occur and sediment from mining sites that flow into the river worsens and lowers reservoirs, coupled with Balikpapan conditions has few rivers and less fertile land.

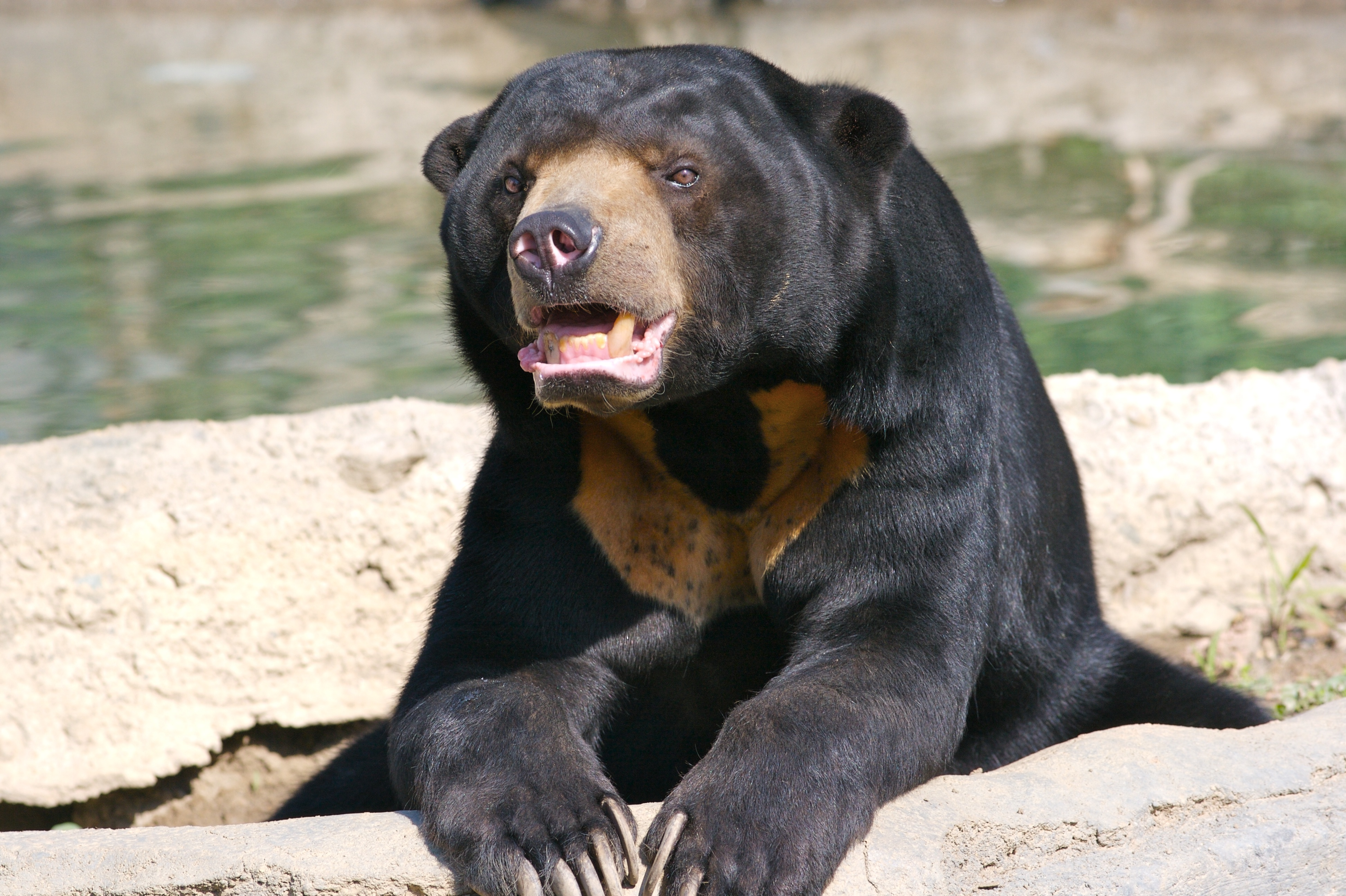
Sun bear is an endangered animal and official mascot of Balikpapan

The population of the Balikpapan's mascot, the sun bear, has diminished and only 50 are left. This is due to coal mining which narrows the habitat of sun bears, so they are reluctant to reproduce. In addition to sun bears, other Balikpapan animals that are declared endangered are proboscis monkeys, borneo gibbon, bornean orangutans, pangolin and otter civet. Almost extinct animals in Balikpapan include the Bornean Banteng (Bos javanicus lowi), a species of wild bovines.

== Administrative divisions ==
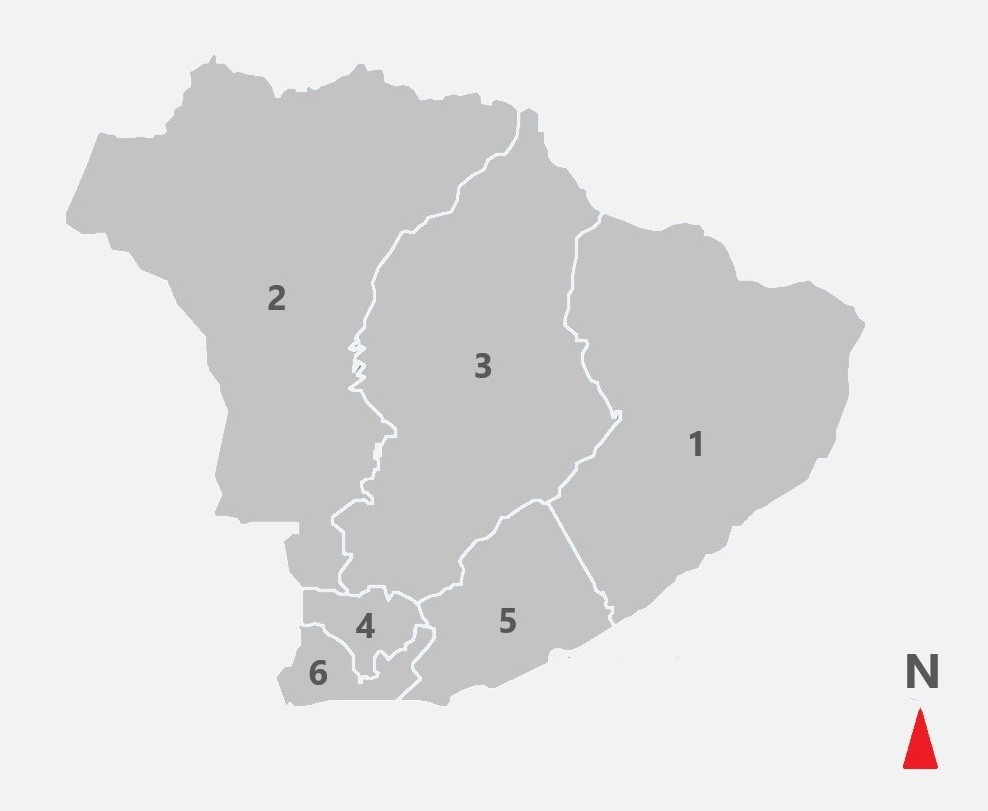
Map of Balikpapan

Balikpapan is bordered by Kutai Kartanegara Regency to the North, by the Makassar Strait to the South and East, and by Penajam North Paser Regency to the West. The city is divided into 6 districts (kecamatan) subdivided into 34 urban villages (kelurahan) tabulated below with their 2010 and 2020 Census populations, together with the official estimates as at mid 2025.

Kode Wilayah	Name of District (kecamatan)	Area in km^{2}	Pop'n Census 2010	Pop'n Census 2020	Pop'n Estimate mid 2025	No. of urban villages (kelurahan)	Post codes
64.71.01	East Balikpapan (Balikpapan Timur)	137.158	60,664	90,243	109,674	4 (Lamaru, Manggar, Manggar Baru, Teritip)	76116 - 76118
64.71.02	West Balikpapan (Balikpapan Barat)	179.952	83,412	94,123	99,351	6 (Baru Ilir, Baru Tengah, Baru Ulu, Kariangau, Margasari, Margo Mulyo)	76131 - 76134
64.71.03	North Balikpapan (Balikpapan Utara)	132.166	123,214	169,150	199,564	6 (Batu Ampar, Graha Indah, Gunung Samarinda, Gunung Samarinda Baru, Karang Joang, Muara Rapak)	76125, 76127 - 76129, 76136
64.71.04	Central Balikpapan (Balikpapan Tengah)	11.074	98,552	106,952	106,014	6 (Gunung Sari Ilir, Gunung Sari Ulu, Karang Jati, Karang Rejo, Mekar Sari, Sumber Rejo)	76121 - 76124
64.71.05	South Balikpapan (Balikpapan Selatan)	37.814	191,737	145,007	165,614	7 (Damai Bahagia, Damai Baru, Gunung Bahagia, Sepinggan, Sepinggan Baru, Sepinggan Raya, Sungai Nangka)	76114 - 76115
64.71.06	Balikpapan Town (Balikpapan Kota)	10.225	^{(a)}	82,843	85,835	5 (Damai, Klandasan Ilir, Klandasan Ulu, Prapatan, Telaga Sari)	76111 - 76114
	Totals	503.305	557,579	688,318	766,052	34	

Notes: (a) the 2010 populations of Balikpapan Town District are included in the 2010 figure for South Balikpapan District, from which they were later split off.

Before 1987, Balikpapan Seberang was originally part of Balikpapan. However, due to enactment of the government regulation no. 21 on 13 October 1987, most of the district (excluding parts of Jenebora and Pantai Lango villages) was transferred into Paser Regency (Pasir) and later renamed as Penajam District (Sepaku was split in 1996, and the two districts are now part of Penajam North Paser Regency).

== Demographics ==
During the Suharto dictatorship Balikpapan achieved unprecedented economic growth by attracting foreign investments, particularly in the exploitation of natural and mineral resources. The policy was heavily criticized for uncontrolled environmental damage and corrupt bureaucrats and politicians, but it significantly boosted urban development in resource-rich cities. In the 1970s Balikpapan experienced 7% population growth annually, while exports of timber and petroleum increased dramatically.

The most numerous ethnic group in Balikpapan is the Balik, who form a minority. Based on their origins, migrants come from neighbouring islands such as Java, Madura and Sulawesi. Residents come mainly from ethnic migrants who have long settled in Balikpapan, namely from the ethnic Banjar, Bugis, Makassar, and Javanese. Other migrants including ethnic Minahasan, Madurese, and Sundanese. At the beginning of June 2014, the population reached 684,339 people with the number of arrivals during 2012 of 21,486 people, the highest number in the past three years. The number of migrants was able to exceed the number of newcomers who entered in Singapore in the same year which was as many as 20,693 inhabitants. The highest number of arrivals came from Java, which was 30%, then followed by Banjar and Bugis each by 20%, Toraja by 11%, Madura by 8%, Buton by 7% and Betawi by 4%.

=== Indonesian Most Liveable City ===
Based on Indonesian Most Liveable City Index which measured 27 indicators in every 2 years, Balikpapan is the best city for living in 2013 and toppled Yogyakarta as the best in 2011 and 2009. Balikpapan mainly maintained city management aspects and environment wellbeing. As part of the Earth Hour City Challenge, Balikpapan was recognized as the Most Loveable City for 2015. In 2016, Balikpapan was nominated for the second time as the most lovable and sustainable city, pending final judgement. However, in 2022, Balikpapan was no longer in the top 10, Samarinda held the top spot.

== Economy ==
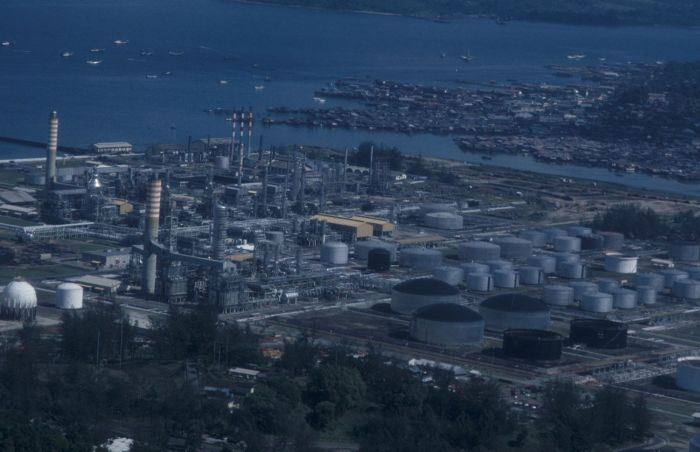
Balikpapan oil refinery in 1988

Some multinational corporations operate in East Borneo. Companies including Baker Hughes (US), ChevronTexaco (US), Halliburton (US), Pertamina (Indonesia), Schlumberger (France), Thiess (Australia), TotalEnergies (France) and Weatherford International (US) use Balikpapan as their base of operations in the region. Governmental public services including Bank Indonesia, the Finance Department, Angkasa Pura 1, the Port of Semayang, and several others also attract many people to work in this area.

Balikpapan has been chosen as the site of some important governmental agencies such as Komando Daerah Militer VI Tanjungpura and Kepolisian Daerah Kaltim.

Balikpapan oil refinery is on the shore of Balikpapan Bay and covers an area of 2.5 square kilometers (0.97 square miles). Founded in 1922, it is the oldest refinery in the area. The Allies destroyed it in the Second World War and Shell re-built it in 1950. The refinery has two subunits, Balikpapan I and Balikpapan II.

Balikpapan I has two raw oil refinery units that produce naphtha, kerosene, gasoline, diesel fuel, and residue and one high-vacuum unit that produces 100 metric tons (110 short tons) of paraffin oil distillate (POD), used as raw material for wax factories. The wax itself has various grades and is sold domestically and internationally.

Opened on 1 November 1983, Balikpapan II has a hydro-skimming and hydro-cracking refinery and produces petrol, LPG, naphtha, kerosene, and diesel fuel.

Indonesian government and their Pertamina planning as for 2017 expanding the oil refinery including the area of Persiba Balikpapan FC (old) stadium and Pertamina residents near the refinery. Balikpapan's former mayor Rizal Effendi ask for primarily using Balikpapan peoples as worker that Pertamina needed up to 20.000 new employers.

== Education ==
=== Schools ===
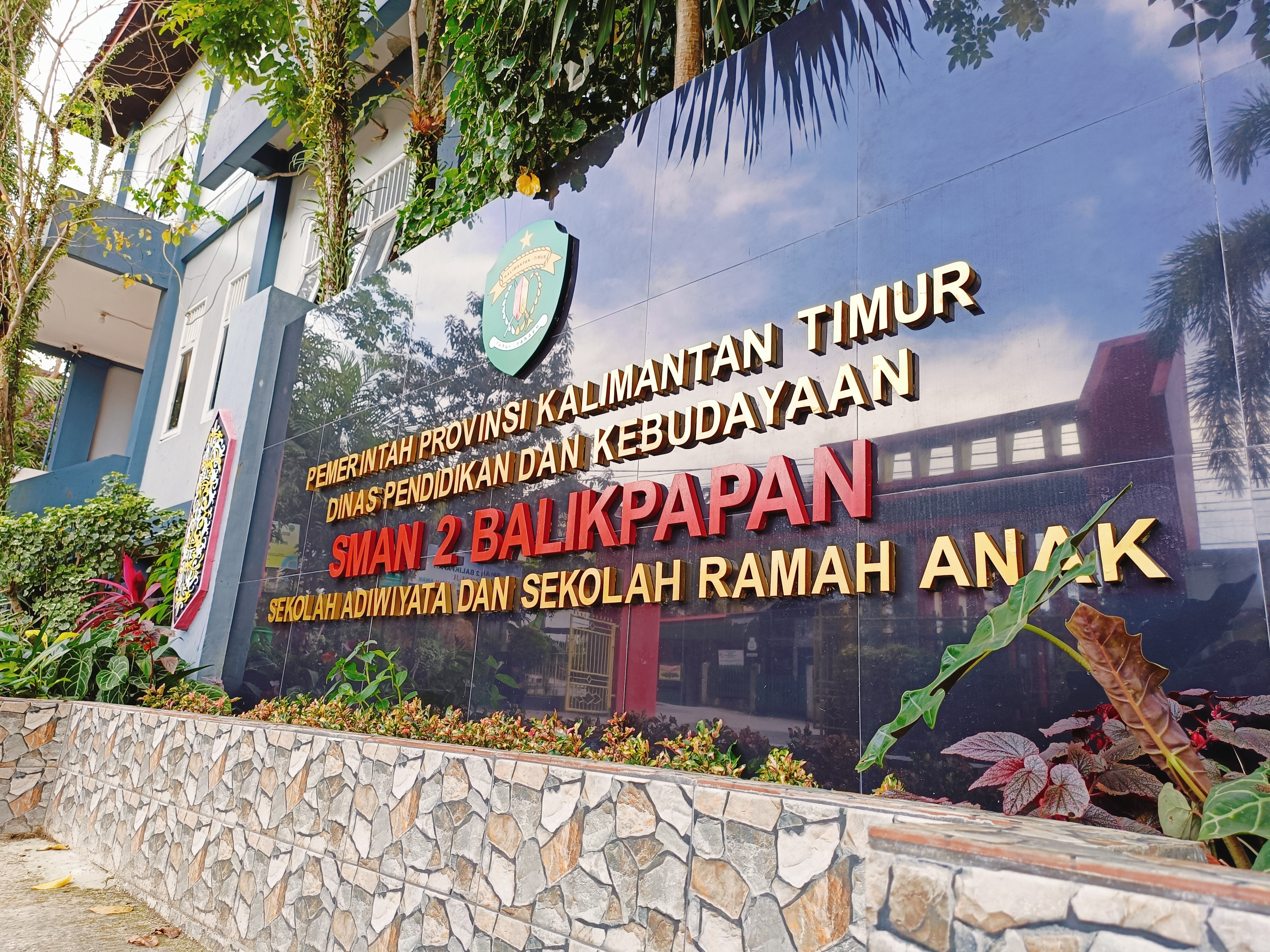
SMAN 2 Balikpapan

As of 2025, there are 196 elementary schools (SD), 79 junior high schools (SMP), 29 senior high schools (SMA), 34 vocational schools (SMK), and 8 Madrasah Aliyah (MA). Some of these are:

- SDN 001 Balikpapan
- SMPN 3 Balikpapan
- SMAN 2 Balikpapan Utara
- SMA Patra Dharma
- SMK Negeri 1 Balikpapan
- Etc.

=== College ===
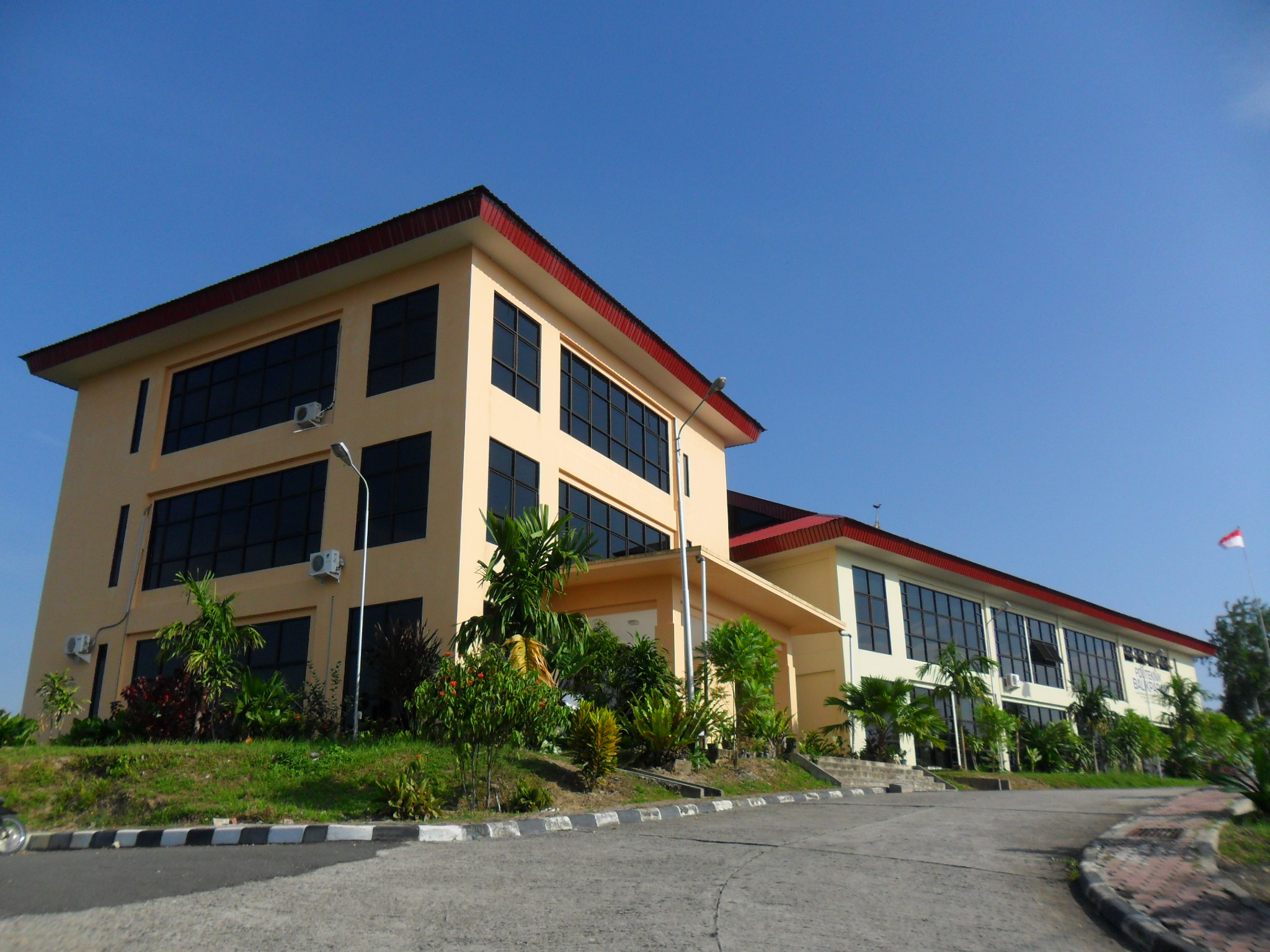
Politeknik Negeri Balikpapan campus

There are 13 colleges. some of these are Universitas Balikpapan, Institut Teknologi Kalimantan (ITK), Politeknik Negeri Balikpapan, etc.

== Tourism ==
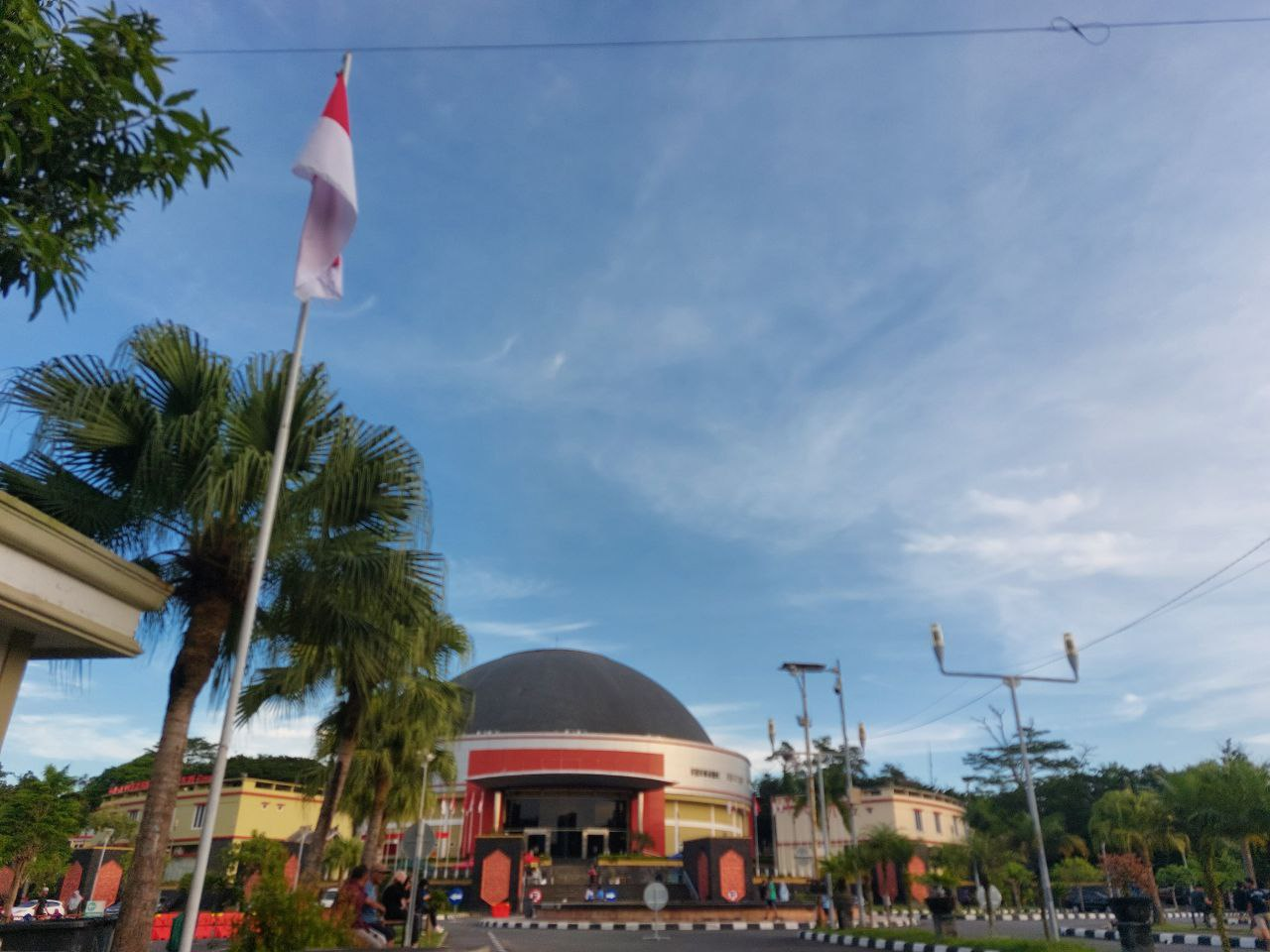
Balikpapan sports and convention center

As a coastal city, Balikpapan has many beaches, including Manggar Beach, Segara Beach, Monument Beach, Kemala Beach, and Brigade Mobile Beach near the police academy. Melawai Beach is the most popular for local citizens.

Balikpapan is a departure point for nature tourism. Wain River Protected Forest, a Balikpapan natural reserve covering 10,000 hectares and also the habitat to a number of endangered animals, like the Beruang Madu (honey bear) which are sun bears endemic to the area, Orangutans and Proboscis monkeys or Bekantan. Wain river reserve, moreover, houses a number of endangered plants. Near Balikpapan is also a crocodile farm called Teritip, in Lamaru.

There is also a well-known forest site which has been developed for visitors at Bukit Bangkirai rainforest, about 45 minutes by car from Balikpapan.

A mangrove forest at Kariangau is a worthwhile tourist attraction at Balikpapan. There are still some Japanese artillery sites from World War II, and there is a military monument at Kampung Baru.

Panorama of Kemala Beach.

=== Balikpapan Botanical Garden ===
It is the first Botanical Garden in Kalimantan as a part of Hutan Lindung Sungai Wain (Wain River Conservation Forest) with total area 10,000 hectares (25,000 acres) and still has orangutan, sunbear, deer, and some endemic species of Kalimantan birds. Balikpapan Botanical Garden, which is located at kilometer 15 on Jalan Soekarno Hatta, was officially opened on 20 August 2014. It has 1,200 types of lowland hardwood trees, covers 309.22 hectares (764.1 acres) and is known as the "green open space" of the city. At the opening ceremony, Forestry Minister Zulkifli Hasan expressed the hope that the Botanical Garden would rival Gardens by the Bay in Singapore.

=== Shopping ===
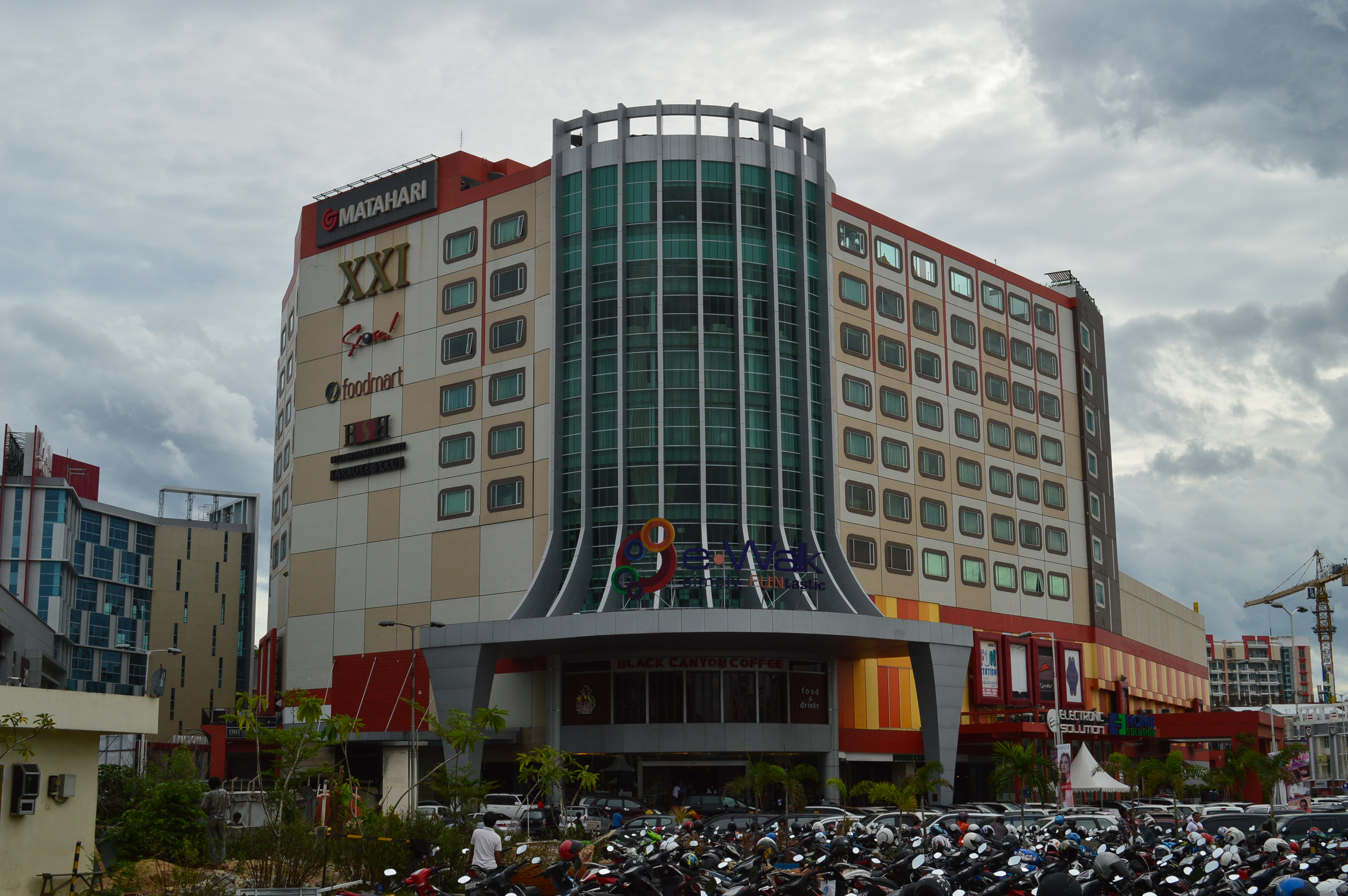
E-Walk, part of the Balikpapan Superblock

As one of the fastest developing cities in the nation, Balikpapan has been supported by the rise of shopping centers. There are six major shopping malls in town which are Plaza Balikpapan, Balikpapan Superblock, Pentacity Mall Balikpapan, Balcony City, Mall Fantasy in Balikpapan Baru, Ocean Square and Plaza Kebun Sayur.

== Sport ==
There are several stadium such as Batakan Stadium, Persiba Stadium, etc.

Persiba Balikpapan is a football club based in Balikpapan with Batakan Stadium as the ground.

== Transportation ==
=== Airport ===
Balikpapan is served by Sultan Aji Muhammad Sulaiman Sepinggan International Airport, which was previously known as Sepinggan airport. The airport has capacity to serve 10 million passengers per year, as well as immigration, passenger convenience, company reps offices, restaurants, shopping and many others. The airport is equipped with 11 aerobridges and four-level parking garages.

=== Seaports ===
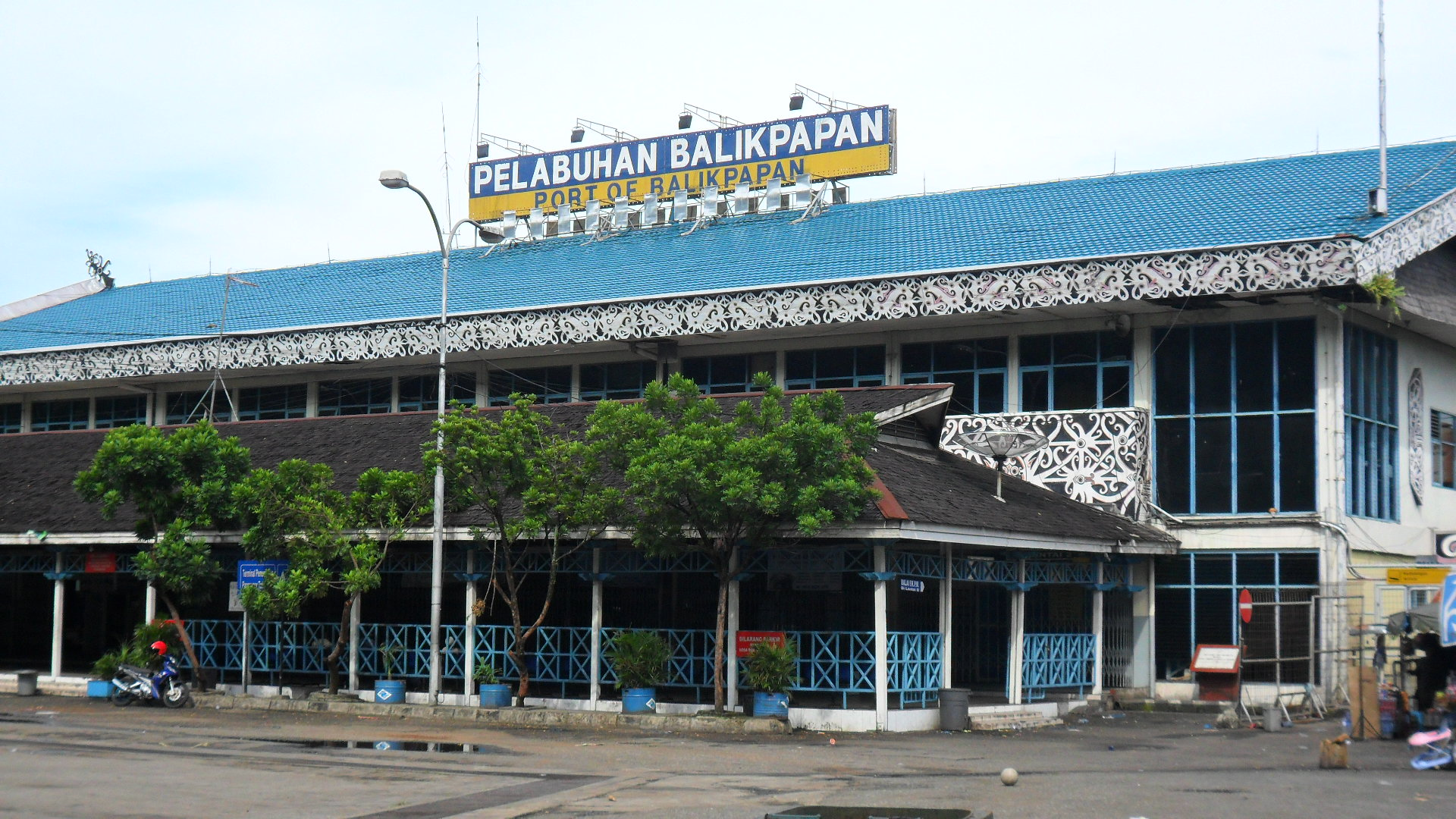
Port of Balikpapan

There are several public and private sea ports located at Balikpapan Bay. Semayang seaport serves commercial boats to many destinations to Indonesia including Jakarta, Makassar, Manado, Pare Pare and Surabaya. In the 1990s maritime transport was very popular. Today, due to more affordable and efficient airplane travel, more people choose to fly. Taking the ferry is a main choice for traveling to Penajam. Kariangau Seaport was built to serve containers and all other industrial needs. It is located in km.13, as part of Kariangau Industrial Estate.

=== Public transport ===
There are various kinds of local transport, including angkot, ojek, taxicabs and shuttle bus service. Online transportation are also available.

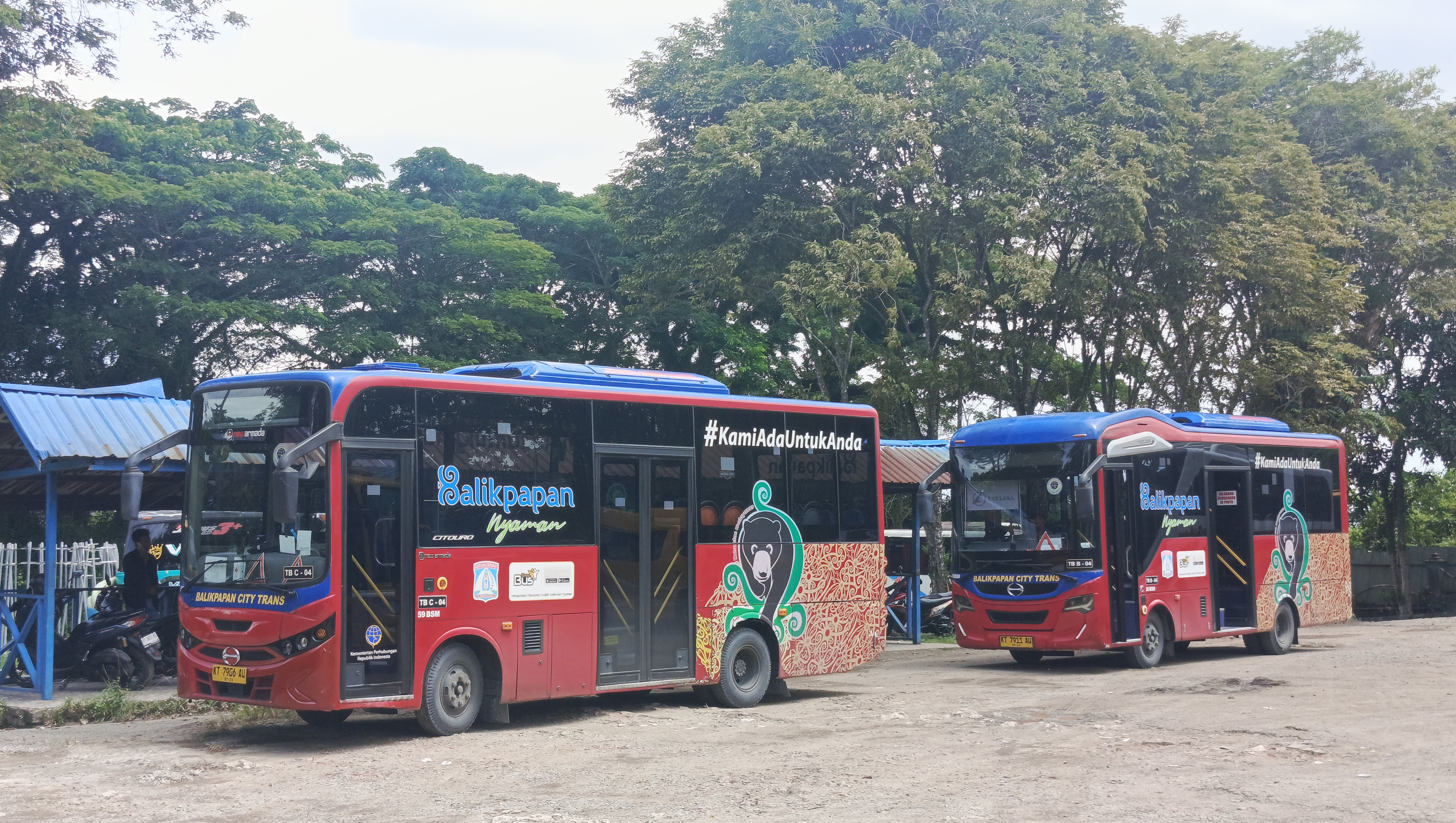
Bacitra buses in terminal

The city is served by Balikpapan City Trans (Bacitra) since its auguration in 2024 with 3 corridors. The government plans to extend the routes further north and into Manggar in the west.

=== Bus terminal ===
The main bus terminal in Balikpapan is Terminal Batu Ampar (located in Batu Ampar, Balikpapan Utara) and one of major destination rute is Samarinda.

=== Balikpapan-Samarinda Toll Road ===
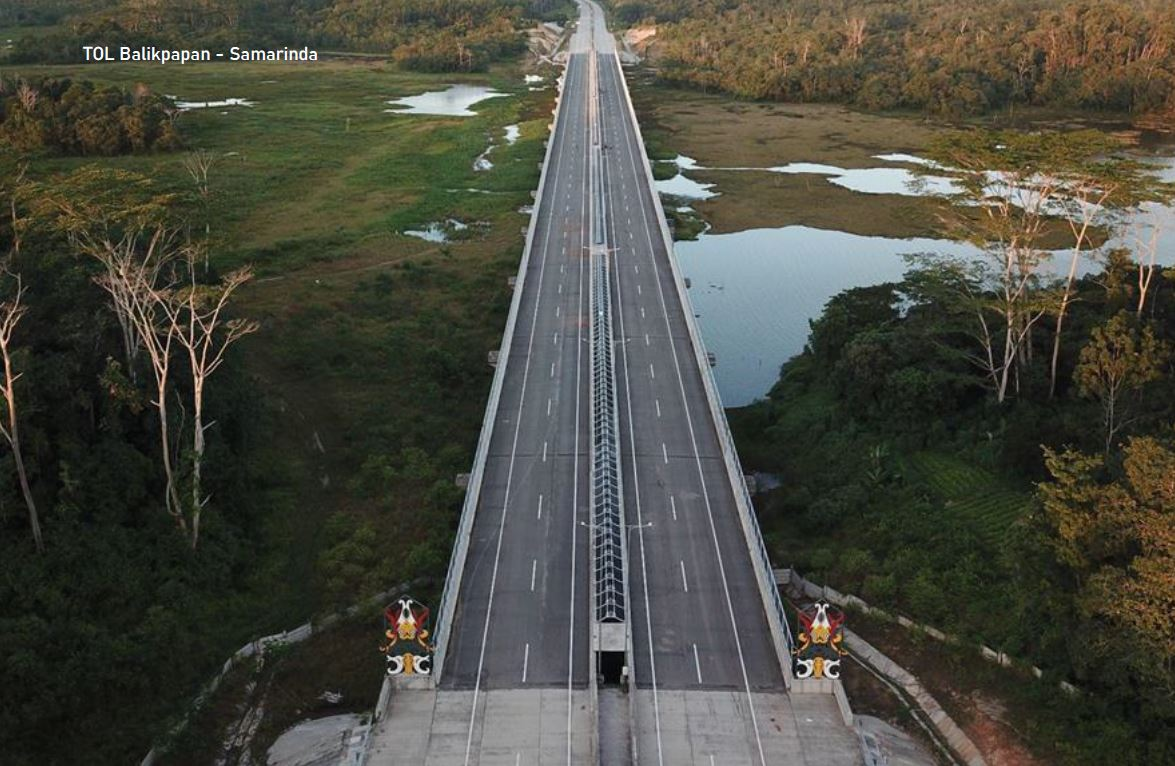
Balikpapan-Samarinda Toll Road

Balikpapan is connected by Trans-Kalimantan Highway Southern Route. From Balikpapan to Samarinda, the highway runs in parallel with the first controlled-access expressway in Borneo, the Balikpapan–Samarinda Toll Road was operational by the beginning of 2020 in section 2–4, and opened in section 1 and 5 in May 2021. Balikpapan–Samarinda toll road is notoriously wasteful because it is the loneliest toll road in Indonesia, costing 9.9 trillion rupiahs with a bumpy surface.

=== IKN Toll Road ===
A planned toll road spanning 47 km connecting Balikpapan and Nusantara is currently under construction.

== Media ==
There are 4 local channels such as Balikpapan TV, BTV Balikpapan, BKV Channel, and TV Beruang based in the city.

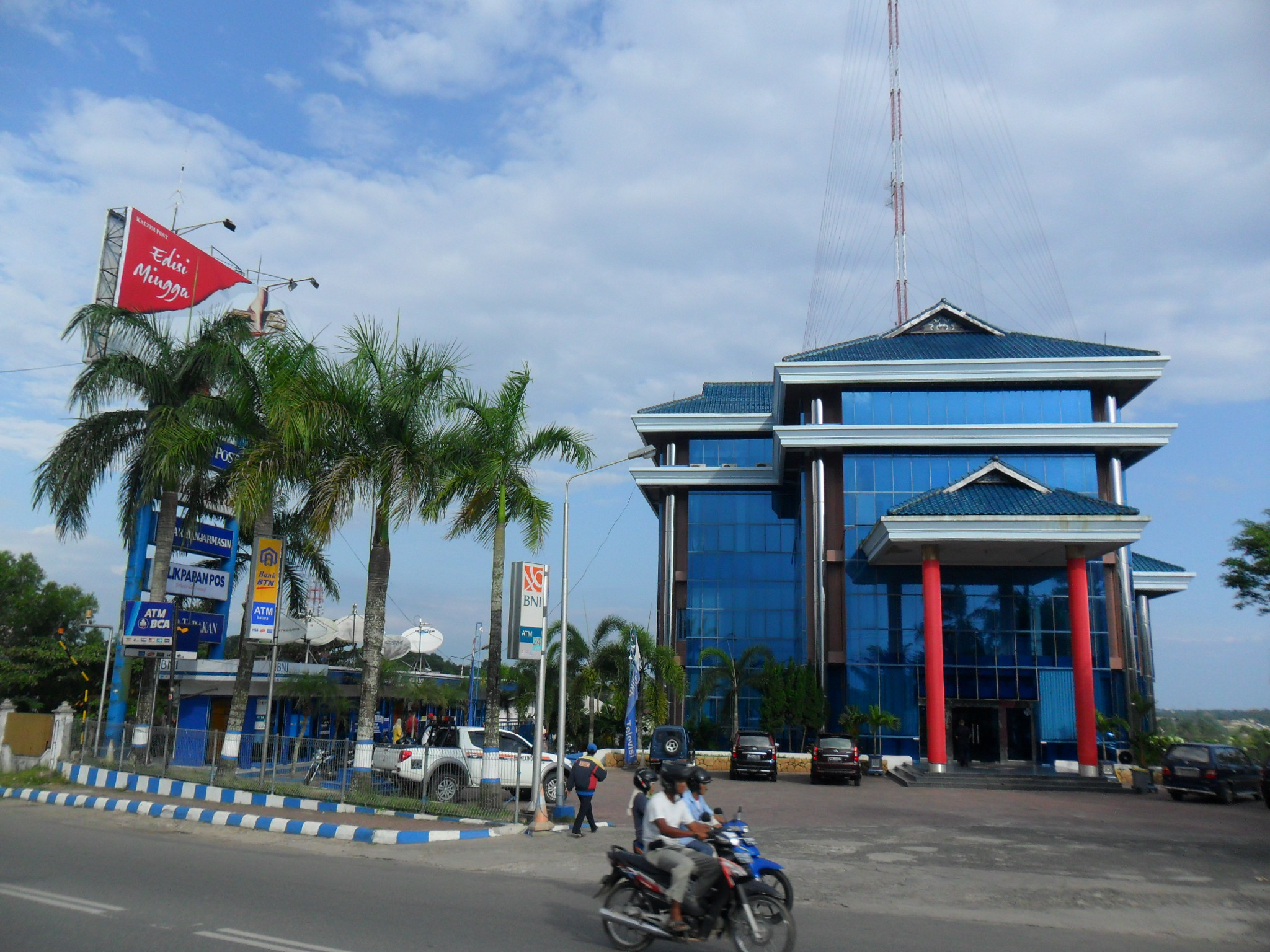
Kaltim Post Headquarters in Balikpapan

Notable local newspaper in East Kalimantan, Kaltim Post based in Balikpapan. There are also Balikpapan Post (formerly known as Metro Post Balikpapan), and Tribun Kaltim based in the city.

== Sister cities ==
Balikpapan has relationships with these cities:

- Kota Kinabalu, Sabah, Malaysia
- Sapporo, Hokkaido, Japan
- Yokohama, Kanagawa, Japan

== Notable people ==
- Solvig Baas Becking, textile artist
- Bima Sakti, former football player and coach of Indonesia national under-17 football team

== See also ==
- Nusantara
- Penajam
