= Bay of Balikpapan =

Bay in Indonesia

- Teluk Balikpapan (Indonesian)
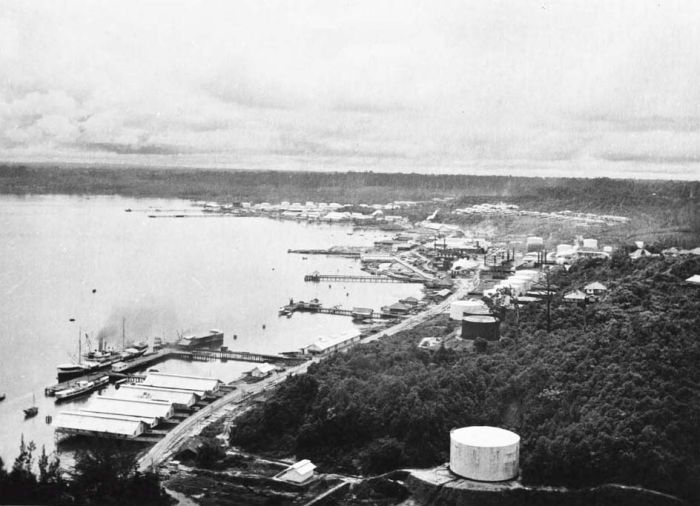
- Bay of Balikpapan ca.1910

- Location within Borneo
- Location: Southeast Asia
- Coordinates: 1°15′00″S 116°48′00″E
- Type: Bay
- Basin countries: Indonesia
- References: Teluk Balikpapan: Indonesia National Geospatial-Intelligence Agency, Bethesda, MD, USA

The Bay of Balikpapan (Indonesian: Teluk Balikpapan), is a bay in Indonesia, near Borneo island close to the city of Balikpapan, East Kalimantan, Indonesia. The Indonesian company Pertamina has its largest oil refinery on the eastern side of the bay.

== Location ==
The Bay of Balikpapan is located on the western side of Makassar Strait, in the south-west of the Pacific Ocean. The bay borders several areas.

- North: Penajam Paser Utara Regency
- East: Balikpapan city
- South: Makassar Strait
- West: Penajam city and Penajam Paser Utara Regency.

The Bay of Balikpapan is the estuary of the mouths of several rivers such as the Sepaku River and Wain River before emerging into Makassar strait.

== Ports and harbors ==
Several public ports were located in The Bay of Balikpapan, such as:

- Semayang Harbor, the largest passenger and cargo for Balikpapan city.
- Kampung Baru Harbor, a harbour serving ferry boat passenger to Sulawesi
- Kariangau Harbor, a ferry harbor to Balikpapan city.
- Penajam Harbor, a ferry harbor to Penajam city.

Private ports were also located in this area, such as:

- Pertamina, on the eastern part.
- Chevron, on the western part.
- Several coal mining company has its own private port on western and northern part.
