= SMPN 3 Balikpapan =

Location
- Jl.Soekarno Hatta Km.1,5 Gn.Samarinda, Balikpapan, Kalimantan Timur, Indonesia
- Coordinates: 1°14′03″S 116°50′28″E

Information
- Type: Public Junior High School
- Motto: Tiada Hari Tanpa Prestasi (No day without a Performance)
- Established: August 31, 1962
- Principal: Hj. Eny Wahyuni, M.Pd
- Grades: VII to IX
- Accreditation: A
- Website: www.smpn3-bpn.sch.id

SMP Negeri (SMPN) 3 Balikpapan is one of the public Junior High schools in East Borneo, Indonesia. Motto of this school is: “Tiada Hari Tanpa Prestasi”.

== Facilities ==
Some facilities that SMPN 3 provides to support teaching and learning activities:

- Library
- Biology Lab
- Physics Lab
- Computer Lab
- Language Lab
- Multimedia Room
- Recycle / 3R Room
- Administration Office
- Mosque
- Cooperative
- OSIS Room
- Counseling Room
- Meeting Hall
- Studen Health Unit's Room
- Music Room
- Canteen
- Four Fields (Basketball, Volleyball, Tennis and Ceremony) History

== History ==
SMPN 3 Balikpapan has operated since 1962. A leader on that year was Mr. ML Maliangkay. The, on 1966, SMPN 3 has moved out to Kebun Sayur. ML Maliangkay officiated until 1972. On 1972–1988, SMPN 3 was being led by Djumberi. He moved the school to Gn. Samarinda because there was a big fire accident on Kebun Sayur. That accident destroyed most of SMPN 3 buildings. On 1988–1996, SMPN 3's principal was Ganda Sudarman. Next, on 1996, he was being replaced by M. Amir, who was a principal for this school until 2003.

List of principals:

- ML Maliangkay
- Djumberi
- Ganda Sudarman
- M. Amir
- Dra. Tatiek Sulastri
- Dra. Hj. Ida Afrida M. M.Pd
- Supriyani, M.Pd.
- Drs. Purwoto, MM
- Cheiriyah Idha, S.Pd
- Hj. Eny Wahyuni, M.Pd.
