= Hetifah Sjaifudian =

Indonesian activist and politician

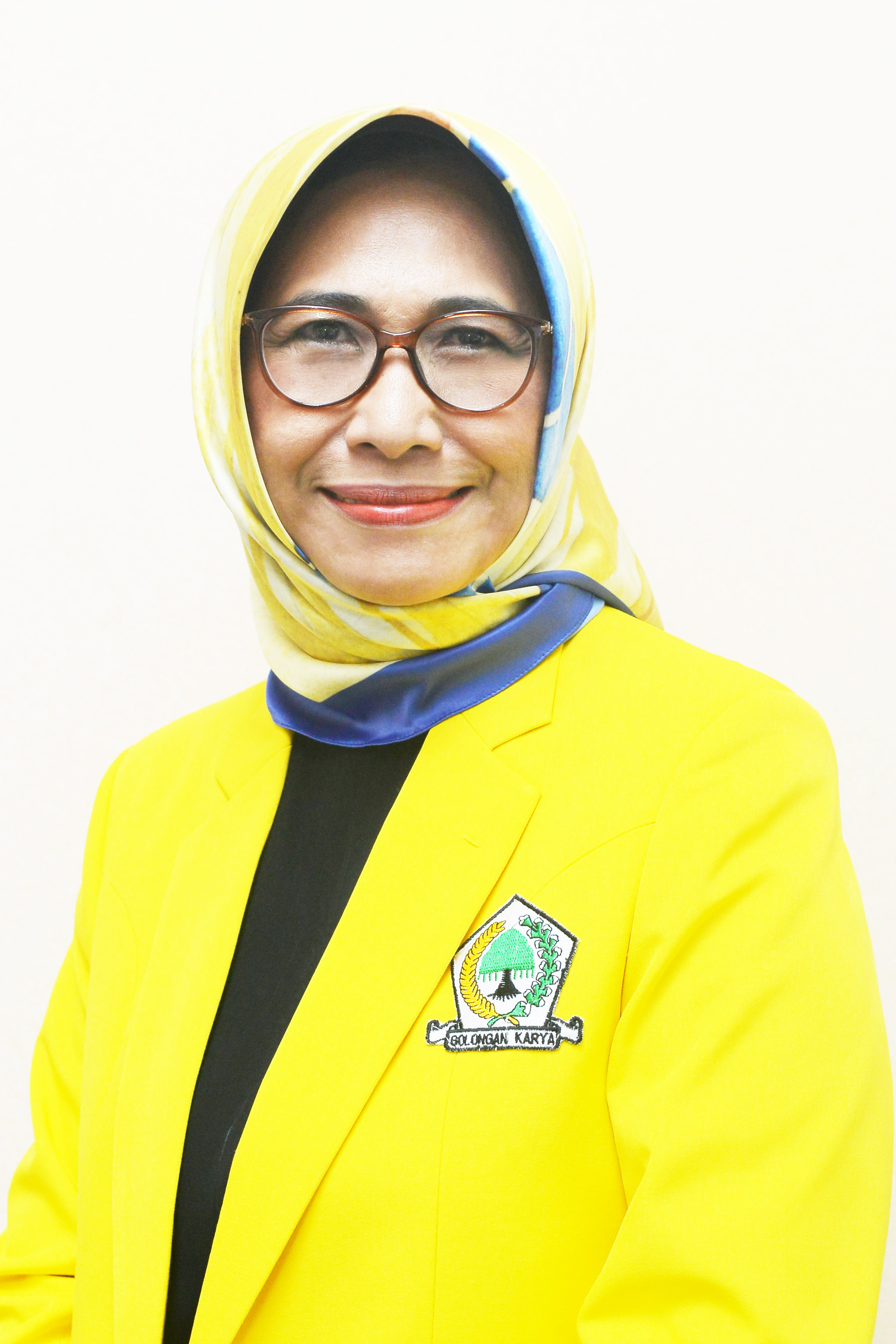
- Hetifah in 2018

Member of the House of Representatives
- Incumbent
- Assumed office 30 September 2019
- In office 1 October 2009 – 30 September 2014
- Constituency: East Kalimantan

Personal details
- Born: Hetifah Sjaifudian; 30 October 1964 (age 61) Bandung, West Java, Indonesia
- Party: Golkar
- Spouse: Siswanda Harso Sumarto
- Education: Bandung Institute of Technology; National University of Singapore (MPP); Flinders University (PhD)
- Occupation: Activist and politician
- Website: hetifah.id

Hetifah Sjaifudian (born 30 October 1964) is an Indonesian campus activist and politician who became a member of the House of Representatives (DPR) from 2009 to 2014 and 2019–present. Additionally, she was designated as Vice Chairman of Commission X in 2019-2024. She is in favor of developing hinterlands and border areas.

== Education ==
Hetifah went to study at SMAN 3 Jakarta from 1979 to 1982; City and Regional Planning at the Bandung Institute of Technology (ITB) from 1982 to 1988; obtained a Master of Public Policy (MPP) at the National University of Singapore from 1993 to 1995; obtained a PhD from the School of Politics and International Relations, Flinders University from 2002 to 2006.

== Career ==
=== Early career ===
Hetifah began her career as a lecturer at the Graduate School Of State Administration from 1977 to 1978; researcher at ITB from 1988 to 1991 and 1997 to 1999; founder and researcher of AKATIGA Center For Social Analysis from 1991 to 2009; lecturer for the Development Studies Program from 1995 to 2000; and executive director of B-Trust Advisory Group Bandung from 2005 to 2009 and 2014 to 2015.

With an emphasis on planning, budgeting, and governance, Hetifah has extensive experience serving as a consultant for numerous international organisations, including the World Bank, Asian Development Bank, European Union, Canadian International Development Agency, Ford Foundation, and others. Innovation, Participation, and Good Governance (published by Obor) is one of her many works.

=== Political career ===
Hetifah became a politician for the Golkar Party in 2008. She holds the dual roles of Chair of KPPG, Golkar's women's wing organisation, and Head of the Women Empowerment Section on the national board. In addition, she serves as the Chair of the Mutual Cooperation Family Deliberation (MKGR). She also serves on the KPP-RI (Indonesian Women's Parliamentary Caucus) presidium.

She was chosen in 2009 to represent the East Kalimantan Electoral Region in the DPR RI. She participated in Commission X's work on education, culture, youth, sports, and tourism when she first started working for the DPR RI in 2009–2011. then joined Commission V, which deals with housing, transportation, infrastructure, and developing neglected areas. Hetifah attempted to run for legislature once more in the 2014 election, however she was not successful in winning reelection. But as chance would have it, she was chosen from the Golkar Party in the East Kalimantan electoral district, has luck on her side. Neni Moerniaeni resigned in order to contest in the 2015 Simultaneous Pilkada as Mayor of Bontang. She received the second most votes, was sworn in as the Inter-Time Change (PAW) on 30 October 2015, taking Neni's place.

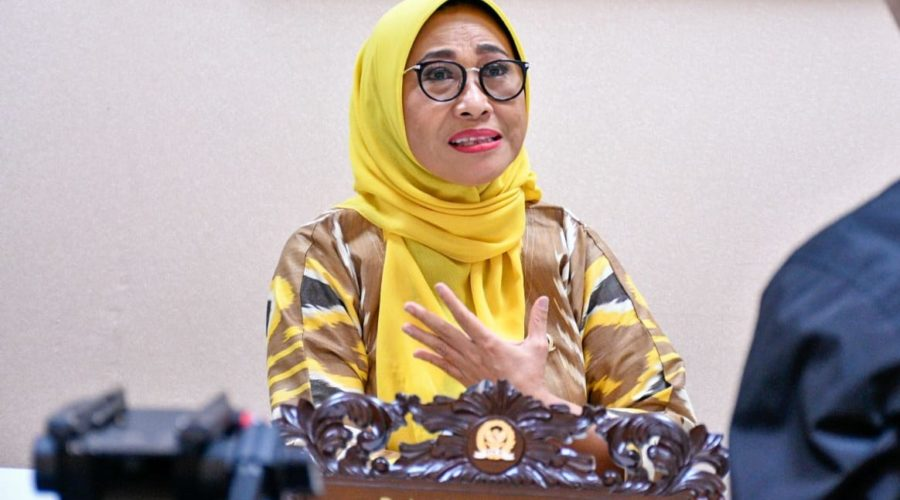
Hetifah dismissing the Value Added Tax (PPN) Debate in the Education Sector in 2021

With 9,111 votes repeated from 10 sub-districts, Hetifah, the candidate for Legislative Member (Caleg) of the DPR RI from Golkar in East Kalimantan, received the most votes in Paser Regency. She received 407 votes from Batu Sopang, 216 from Tanjung Harapan, 1,545 from Pasir Balengkong, 2.264 from Tanah Grogot, 851 from Kuaro, 1,248 from Long Ikis, 422 from Muara Komam, 1,017 from Long Kali, 1,013 from Batu Engau, and 128 from Muara Samu. Through Golkar, Hetifah was re-elected as a member of the DPR RI after receiving 66,487 votes from the East Kalimantan electoral district. Two women are among the eleven deputy general chairs of the Golkar for the 2019–2024 term. Hetifah Sjaifudian and Nurul Qomaril Arifin are the two.

She has been instrumental in making government initiatives a reality, starting with more generously awarded scholarships, the appointment of honorary teachers to State Civil Apparatus (ASN), initiatives to boost the human resource capacity of educators, the growth of events and destinations, the fortification of tourism human resources, the construction of libraries and other infrastructure in different areas, and finally seminars and other educational offerings. "This seminar is an important forum for young people, especially the East Kalimantan Z gene to explore and maximize its potential in the current technology era," Hetifah concluded.

She was reelected for a third term in the 2024 election with 146,062 votes.

== Political positions ==
=== Female equity ===
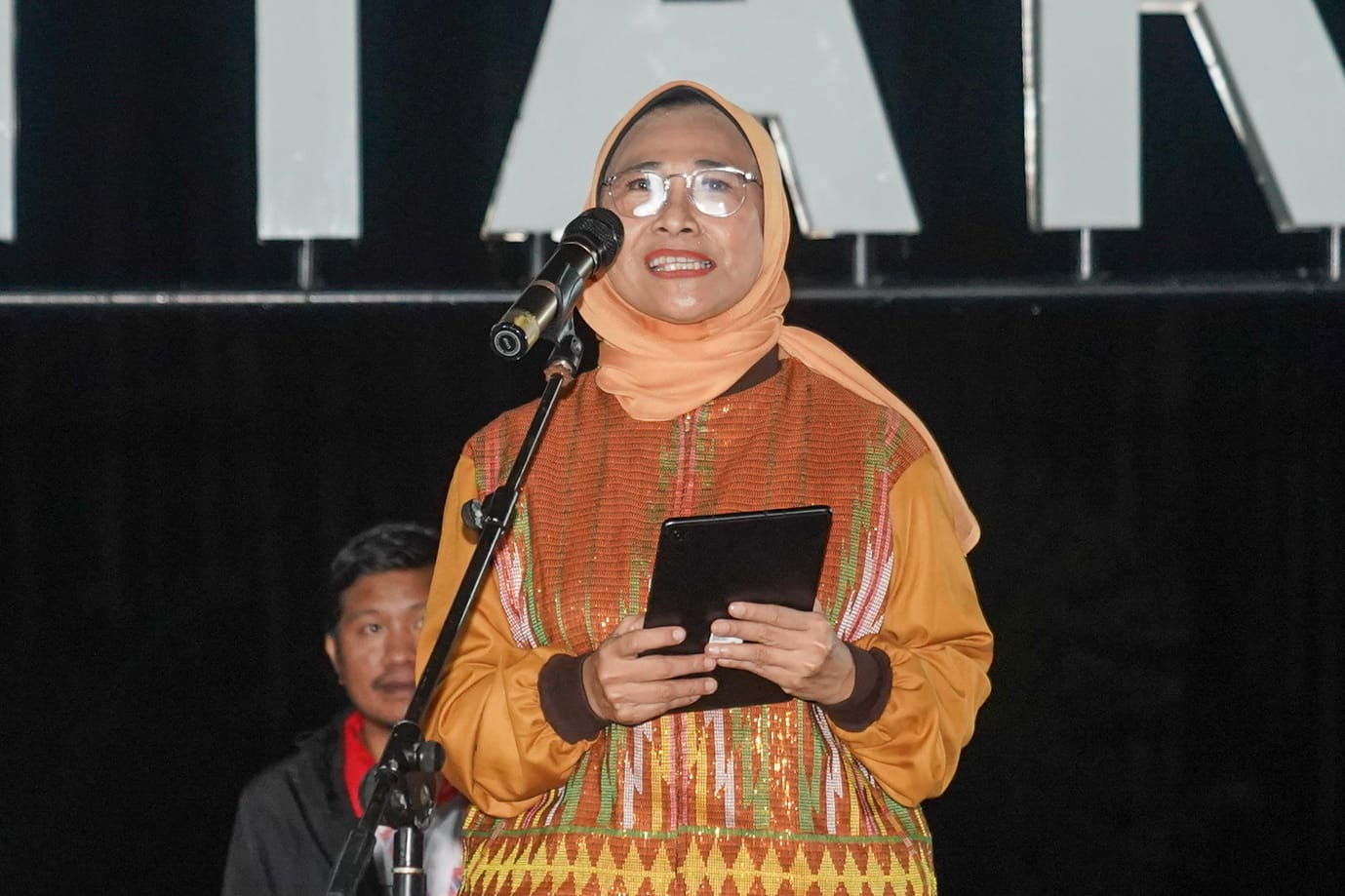
Hetifah giving a speech on the Ministry of Youth and Sports in 2022

Hetifahis is for a greater female equity in DPR leadership in order to advance the cause of Gender Lens Investing (GLI). This entails intentionally focusing on women and providing them with opportunities to lead across all industries, not only those that are typically associated with femininity, such as science and technology. Secondly, putting GLI into practice entails developing policies based on data that takes gender into account. For this reason, funding research institutions—both independent and government-owned—becomes essential.

=== Bullying ===
Hetifah underlined that bullying in schools is harmful and ought to be stopped. She made this statement in reference to the school bullying issue that involved pupils in Cilacap and Balikpapan and went popular on social media. On 2 October 2023, she stated, "Bullying is not something ordinary; don't let there be acts of violence from fellow friends in the school environment." According to her, bullying can also take the form of non-physical acts like insults or cyberbullying.

== Personal life ==
On 30 October 1964, Hetifah was born in Bandung. She comes from an activist family and has been actively involved in a number of NGOs, social organisations, and campus organisations. Hetifah has four daughters: Amirah Kaca, Amanda Kistilensa, Asanilta Fahda, and Nahla Tetrimulya. She is married to Siswanda Harso Sumarto.

== Awards and recognitions ==
Throughout her career, she has earned the following awards and honours;

- KWP Award's Informative Legislator in Social Media (2023)

== Electoral history ==
Election	Legislative institution	Constituency	Political party	Votes	Results
2019	People's Representative Council of the Republic of Indonesia	East Kalimantan	Golkar Party	66,487	Elected
