= Brewe =

- Village
- Location in Kalimantan
- Coordinates: 1°33′41″S 116°7′19″E
- Country: Indonesia
- Province: East Kalimantan
- Regency: Paser
- District: Long Ikis

Population (2023)
  - Total: 350
- Time zone: UTC+8 (IDST)

Brewe is a village in Long Ikis District of Paser Regency, East Kalimantan Province, Indonesia. At the 2023 census, its population was 350.
