= Tanjung Harapan =

Tanjung Harapan may refer to the following places in Indonesia and Malaysia:

- Tanjung Harapan, Paser, a district in Paser Regency, East Kalimantan, Indonesia
- Tanjung Harapan, Solok, a district in Solok City, West Sumatra, Indonesia
- Tanjung Harapan Airport, an airport in Tanjung Selor, Bulungan Regency, North Kalimantan, Indonesia
- Tanjung Harapan, Port Klang, a tourist spot in Selangor, Malaysia
