= Olung =

Village in Long Ikis, Paser Regency, East Kalimantan

- Village
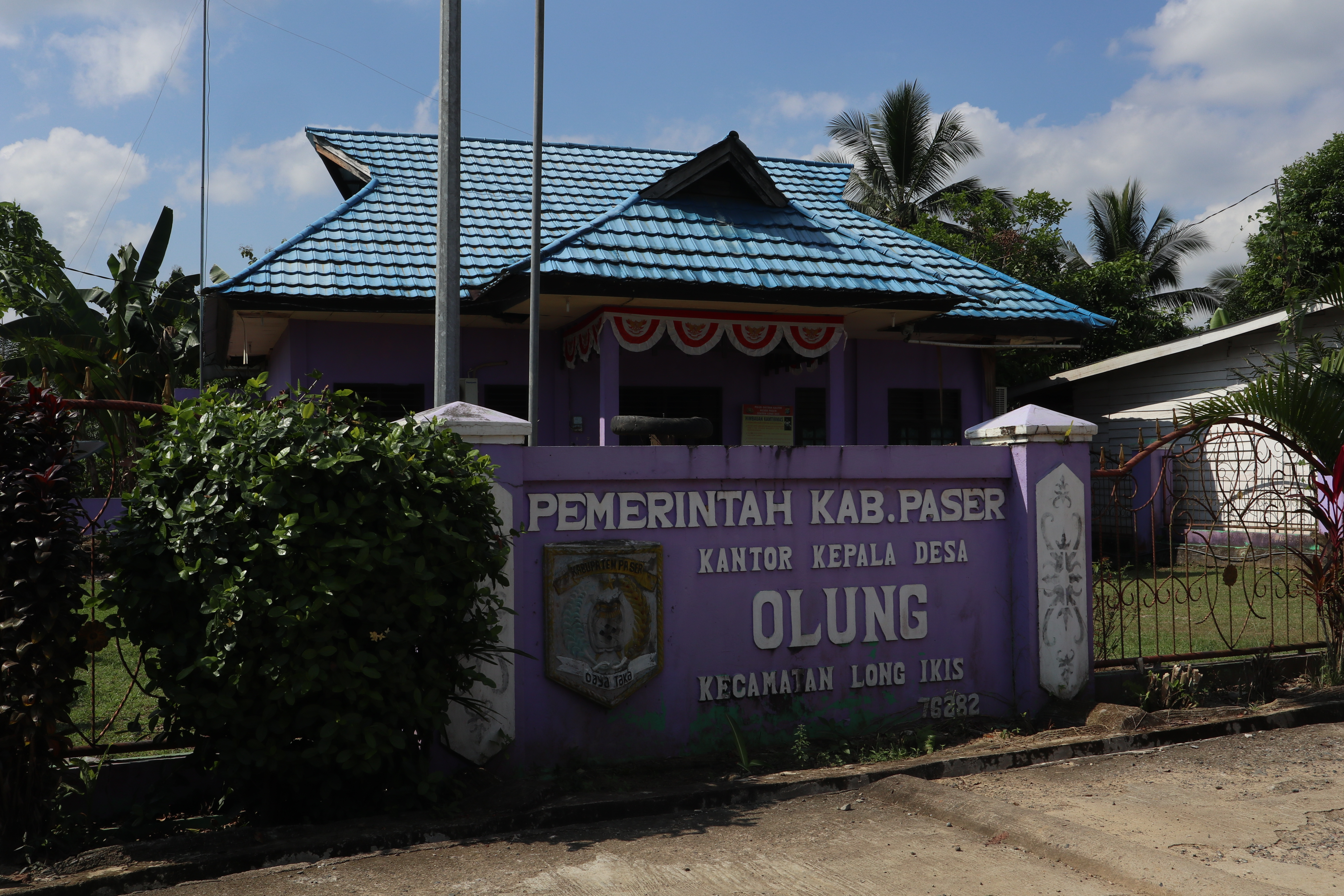
- Olung village office
- Interactive map of Olung
- Location Olung (Indonesia)
- Coordinates: 1°34′6.5″S 116°11′52.2″E
- Country: Indonesia
- Province: East Kalimantan
- Regency: Paser
- District: Long Ikis

Area
  - Total: 30.58 km^{2} (11.81 sq mi)

Population (2023)
  - Total: 1,759
  - Density: 57.52/km^{2} (149.0/sq mi)
- Time zone: UTC+8 (IDST)
- Regional code: 64.01.06.2008

Olung (Indonesian pronunciation: [ˈoluŋ], is a village (desa) within the district of Long Ikis, Paser Regency, East Kalimantan, Indonesia. This village has an area of 30.58 km^{2} and in 2023 was inhabited by 1,759 people. Olung consists of 16 rt (pillar of neighbours).
