= Lusan =

Village in East Kalimantan, Indonesia

- Village
- Interactive map of Lusan
- Location Lusan (Indonesia)
- Coordinates: 1°31′41.2″S 115°44′40.6″E
- Country: Indonesia
- Province: East Kalimantan
- Regency: Paser
- District: Muara Komam

Area
  - Total: 46,671 km^{2} (18,020 sq mi)

Population (2023)
  - Total: 442
  - Density: 0.00947/km^{2} (0.0245/sq mi)
- Time zone: UTC+8 (IDST)
- Regional code: 64.01.07.2010

Lusan is a village (desa) within the district of Muara Komam, Paser Regency, East Kalimantan, Indonesia. This village has an area of 466,71 km^{2} and in 2023 was inhabited by 442 people. Lusan consists of 3 rt (pillar of neighbours).
