= Batu Botuk =

Village in East Kalimantan, Indonesia

- Village
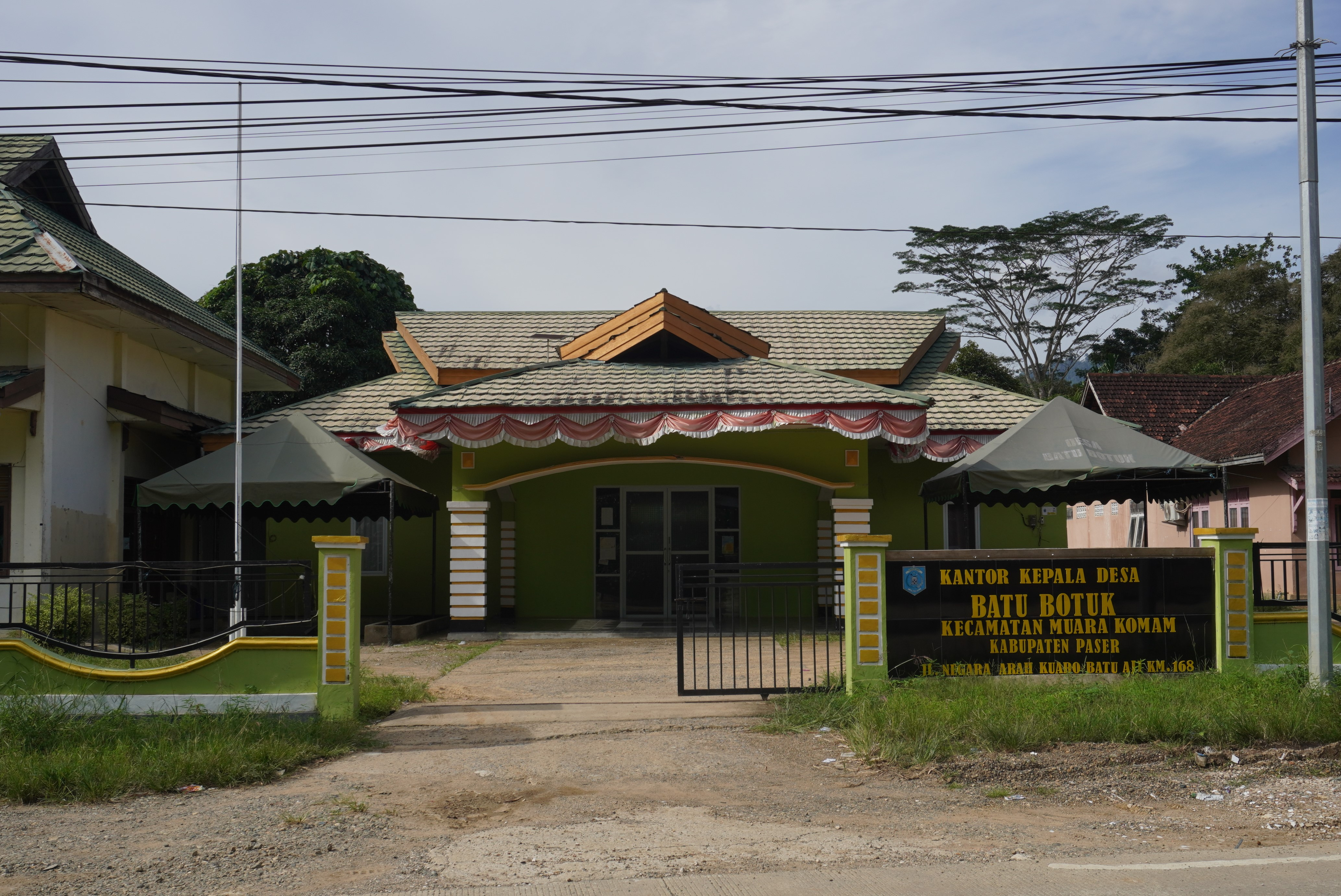
- Batu Botuk village office

- Location within Kalimantan Location within Indonesia
- Coordinates: 1°42′12.2″S 115°49′10.9″E
- Country: Indonesia
- Province: East Kalimantan
- Regency: Paser
- District: Muara Komam

Area
  - Total: 81.30 km^{2} (31.39 sq mi)

Population (2022)
  - Total: 2,269
  - Density: 27.91/km^{2} (72.28/sq mi)
- Time zone: UTC+8 (WITA)
- Regional code: 64.01.07.2002

Batu Botuk is a village (desa) within the district of Muara Komam, Paser Regency, East Kalimantan, Indonesia. This village has an area of 81.30 km^{2} and in 2022 was inhabited by 2,269 people. Batu Botuk consists of 7 rt (pillar of neighbours).
