= Muara Komam =

- District
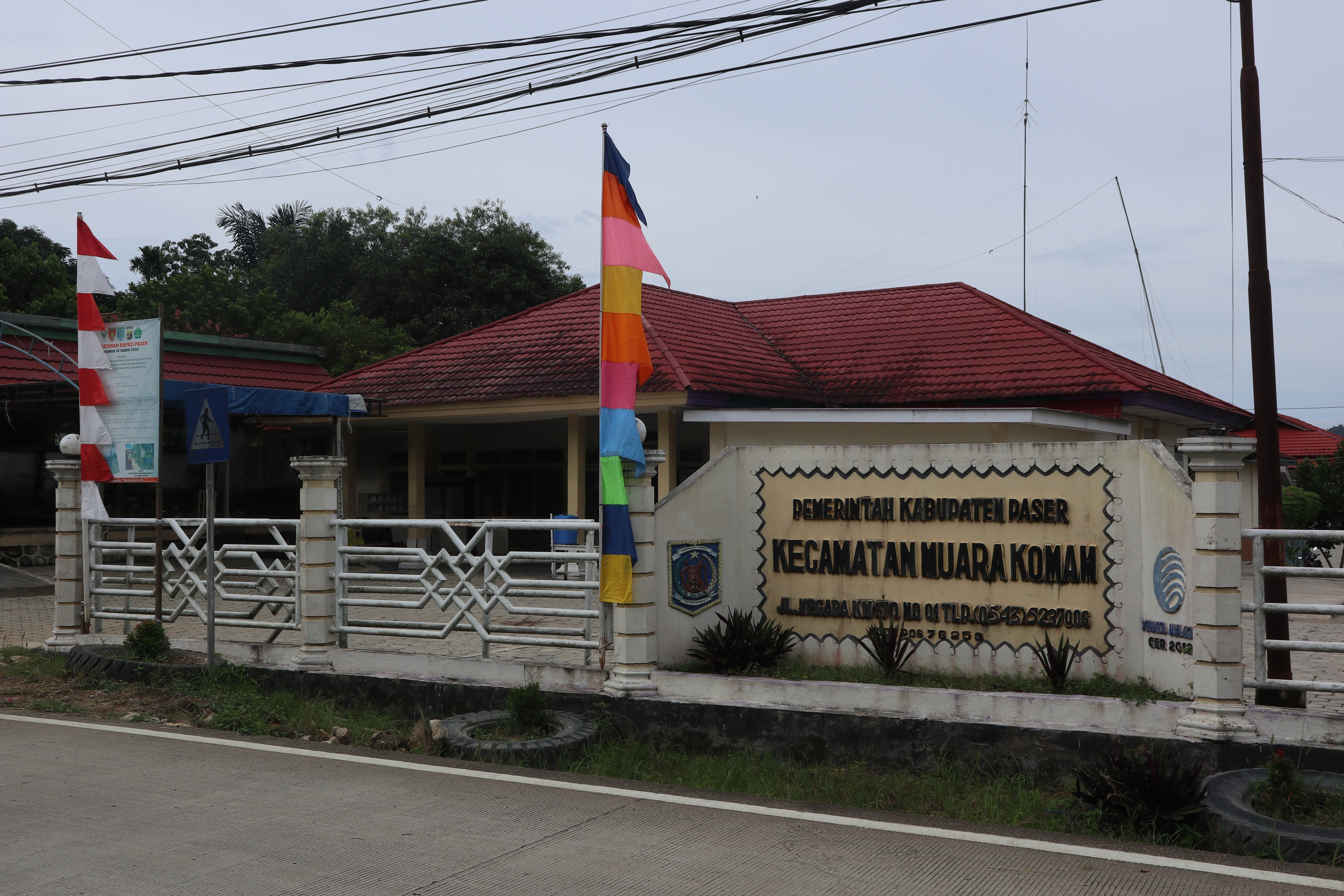
- Muara Komam district office
- Interactive map of Muara Komam
- Location within East Kalimantan Location within Kalimantan Location within Indonesia
- Coordinates: 1°40′39.12100″S 115°48′45.23864″E
- Country: Indonesia
- Province: East Kalimantan
- Regency: Paser
- District seat: Muara Komam

Area
  - Total: 1,753.40 km^{2} (676.99 sq mi)

Population (2023)
  - Total: 14,091
  - Density: 8.0364/km^{2} (20.814/sq mi)
- Time zone: UTC+08:00 (IDST)
- Postal code: 76253
- Regional code: 64.01.07
- Villages: 13

Muara Komam is a district in Paser Regency, East Kalimantan, Indonesia. The district covers an area of 1,753.40 km^{2}, and had a population of 14,091 at the 2023 estimate.

== Governance ==
=== Villages ===
Muara Komam District is divided into 13 villages, consisting of 1 urban village (kelurahan) and 12 rural villages (desa):

Regional code (Kode wilayah)	Name	Area (km^{2})	Population (2022)	RT (rukun tetangga)
64.01.07.1001	Muara Komam	29.81	4,293	15
64.01.07.2002	Batu Butok	81.30	2,269	7
64.01.07.2003	Uko	44.91	354	2
64.01.07.2004	Muara Langon	144.35	2,063	13
64.01.07.2005	Binangon	96.15	546	3
64.01.07.2006	Muara Kuaro	20.36	486	5
64.01.07.2007	Prayon	83.66	252	2
64.01.07.2008	Long Sayo	233.76	237	2
64.01.07.2009	Muara Payang	56.61	631	3
64.01.07.2010	Lusan	466.71	442	3
64.01.07.2011	Swan Slutung	495.78	597	8
64.01.07.2012	Sekuan Makmur	–	757	6
64.01.07.2013	Selerong	–	1,164	6
	Totals	1,753.40	14,091	75
