= Kuaro =

- District
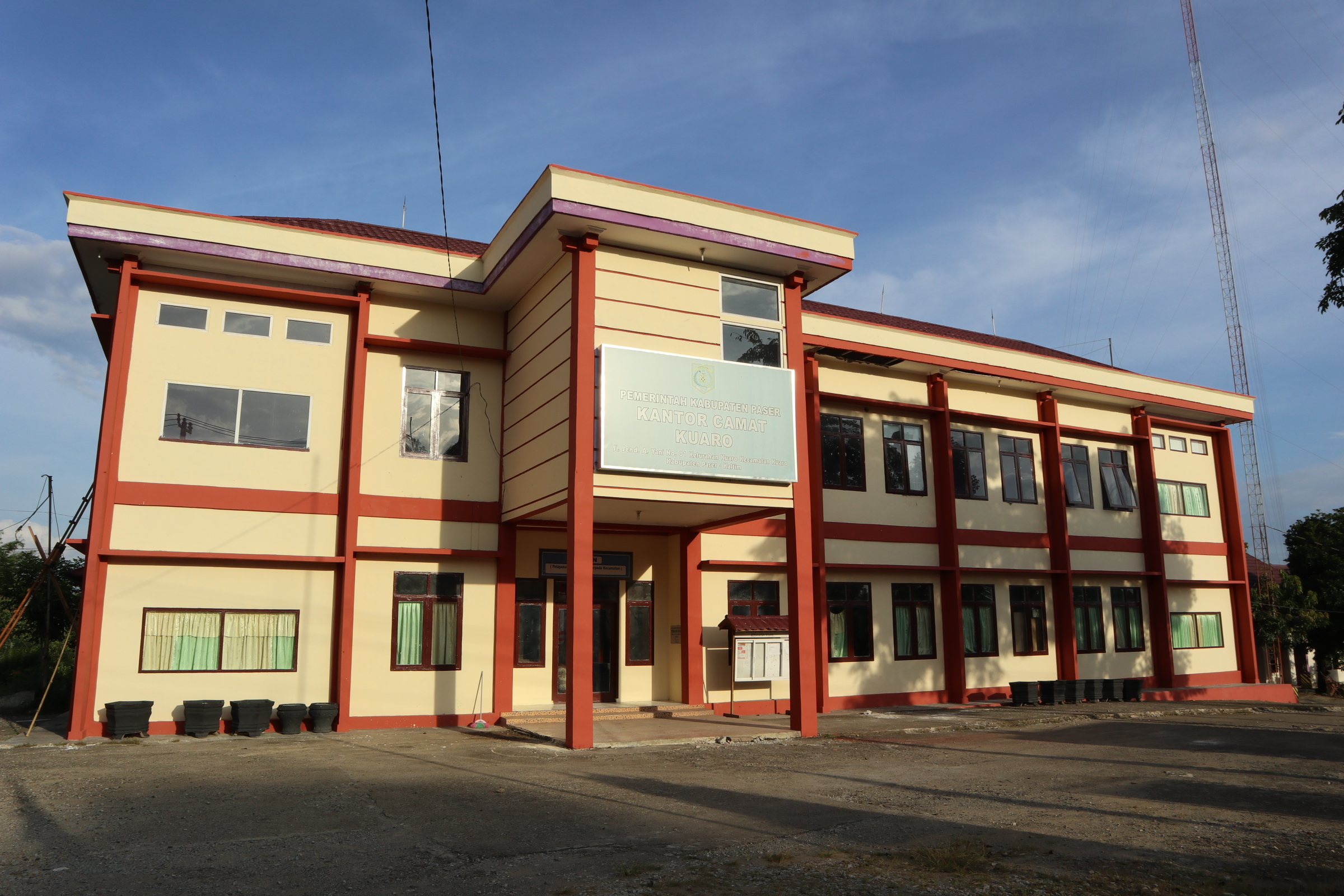
- Kuaro district office

- Location within East Kalimantan Location within Kalimantan Location within Indonesia
- Coordinates: 1°48′54.3096″S 116°5′4.0524″E
- Country: Indonesia
- Province: East Kalimantan
- Regency: Paser
- District seat: Kuaro

Area
  - Total: 747.30 km^{2} (288.53 sq mi)

Population (2023)
  - Total: 31,374
  - Density: 41.983/km^{2} (108.74/sq mi)

Kuaro is a district (kecamatan) in Paser Regency, East Kalimantan, Indonesia. In the mid 2023 estimate, it was inhabited by 31,374 people, and has a total area of 747.30 km^{2}.

== Geography ==
Kuaro consists of one urban village (kelurahan) and twelve rural villages (desa):

- Harapan Baru
- Keluang Paser Jaya
- Kendarom
- Kerta Bumi
- Klempang Sari
- Kuaro ^{(k)}
- Lolo
- Modang
- Padang Jaya
- Pasir Mayang
- Pondang Baru
- Rangan
- Sandeley
