= Tanah Grogot =

District in East Kalimantan, Indonesia

- Kecamatan
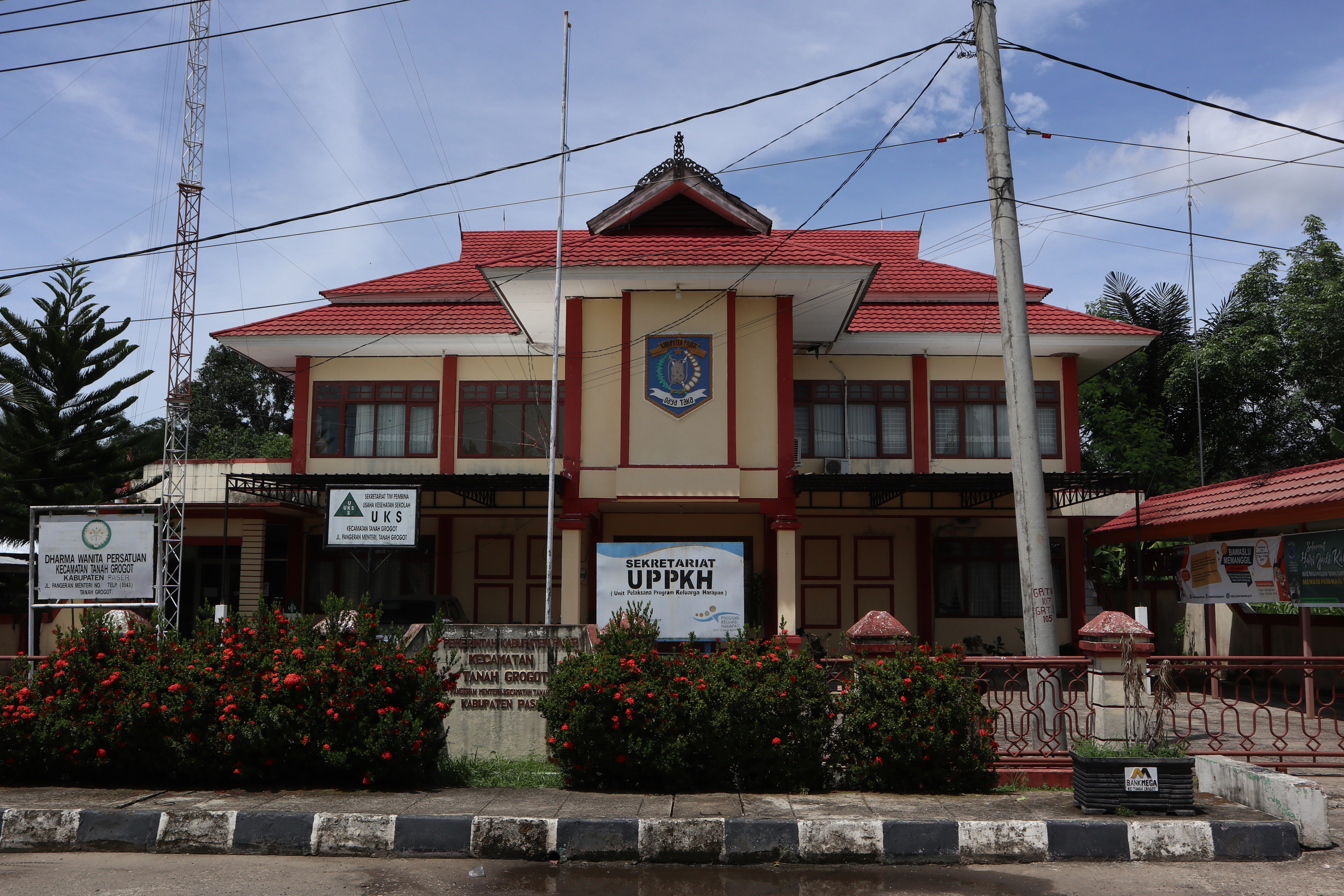
- Tanah Grogot district office

- Location within Kalimantan Location within Indonesia
- Coordinates: 01°54′08″S 116°11′21″E
- Country: Indonesia
- Provinces: East Kalimantan
- Regency: Paser
- Villages: 16

Government
  - Camat: HM Guntur

Area
  - Total: 358.38 km^{2} (138.37 sq mi)
- Elevation: 5 m (16 ft)

Population (2020)
  - Total: 76,344
  - Density: 213.03/km^{2} (551.73/sq mi)
- Time zone: UTC+8 (WITA)
- Postal code: 76251
- Ministry of Home Affairs Code: 64.01.04

Tanah Grogot or Tana Paser (see below) is a district (kecamatan) and the capital of Paser Regency, East Kalimantan, Indonesia. It shares a border with Kuaro in the north, Paser Belengkong in the south. In the year 2020, its total population is 76,344.

On 26 June 1959, Tanah Grogot was inaugurated as the capital of Paser Regency by the law no. 27 of 1959.

== Etymology ==
Tanah Grogot was named after an onomatopoeia for the sound of diesel boat engines (grogot) while crossing the Kandilo (tanah in Indonesian itself means 'land'). The name of this town is sometimes informally shortened to Grogot. Head of the public relations division of Paser government, Adi Maulana in 2012, complained that the reasoning behind its naming were unclear, and he deemed the present name as "outdated". Instead, the local government proposed the renaming into Tana Paser, the efforts that were further promoted by organising Spirit Tana Paser Extreme Offroad Competition from 24 until 25 March 2012, which was won by Said Adul from Balikpapan.

The renaming of the district seat officially took effect on 2 January 2013. Speaker of the Paser Regional DPR, Kaharuddin, stated that he supported the rename proposals for the district, while he also confirmed that the eponymous village would not be renamed. However, Tanah Grogot still remains the most popular name for both the regency seat and the district.

== Geography ==
Tanah Grogot is located on the southern part of Paser Regency, eastern side of Borneo. Its average elevation is 5 meters above the sea level.

== Climate ==
Tanah Grogot has a Tropical Rainforest Climate (Af). It gets the most rainfall in March, with an average precipitation of 305 mm; and the least rainfall in August, with an average precipitation of 92 mm.

Climate data for Tanah Grogot
Month	Jan	Feb	Mar	Apr	May	Jun	Jul	Aug	Sep	Oct	Nov	Dec	Year
Mean daily maximum °C (°F)	29.4 (84.9)	29.5 (85.1)	29.5 (85.1)	29.5 (85.1)	29.4 (84.9)	28.9 (84.0)	28.8 (83.8)	29.5 (85.1)	30.3 (86.5)	30.5 (86.9)	29.8 (85.6)	29.5 (85.1)	29.6 (85.2)
Daily mean °C (°F)	25.8 (78.4)	25.9 (78.6)	25.9 (78.6)	26.1 (79.0)	26.2 (79.2)	25.8 (78.4)	25.6 (78.1)	26 (79)	26.5 (79.7)	26.6 (79.9)	26.2 (79.2)	26 (79)	26.1 (78.9)
Mean daily minimum °C (°F)	23.6 (74.5)	23.6 (74.5)	23.7 (74.7)	23.9 (75.0)	24.1 (75.4)	23.7 (74.7)	23.4 (74.1)	23.5 (74.3)	23.7 (74.7)	23.8 (74.8)	23.8 (74.8)	23.8 (74.8)	23.7 (74.7)
Average rainfall mm (inches)	280 (11.0)	257 (10.1)	305 (12.0)	285 (11.2)	213 (8.4)	176 (6.9)	138 (5.4)	92 (3.6)	102 (4.0)	159 (6.3)	229 (9.0)	269 (10.6)	2,505 (98.5)
Source: Climate-Data.org

== Administrative division ==
Tanah Grogot is divided into the following 15 villages and 1 subdistrict:

Name	Type	Area (km^{2})	Population (2020)
Janju	Village	40.08	2,497
Sempulang	Village	8.20	1,826
Tepian Batang	Village	25.97	5,809
Tanah Grogot	Subdistrict	10.36	30,713
Tanah Periuk	Village	6.74	3,731
Pepara	Village	5.69	715
Sungai Tuak	Village	7.31	1,764
Rantau Panjang	Village	42.44	1,242
Jone	Village	46.78	7,125
Padang Pangrapat	Village	14.60	3,697
Muara Pasir	Village	83.41	3,212
Perepat	Village	N/A	452
Pulau Rantau	Village	44.00	761
Sungai Langir	Village	N/A	355
Tapis	Village	N/A	4,561
Senaken	Village	N/A	7,884

== Demographics ==
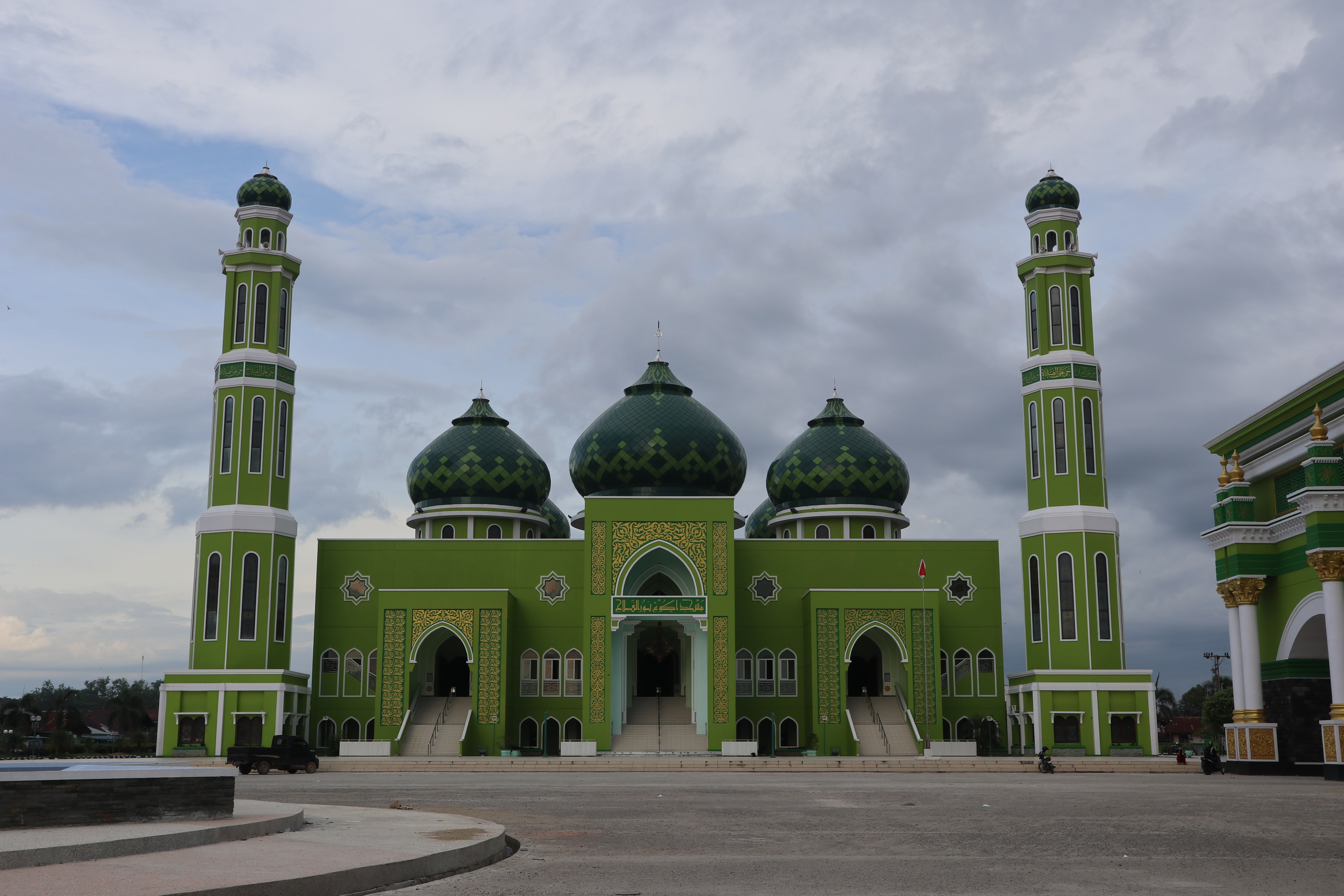
Nurul Falah Grand Mosque

In 2020, there are a total of 76,344 inhabitants within the district. About 97.19% of the population are Muslims, 2.05% are Protestant Christians, 0.64% are Catholic Christians, and the rest 0.12% belong to other religions (Hinduism, Buddhism, etc.) or non-religious.

== Galleries ==
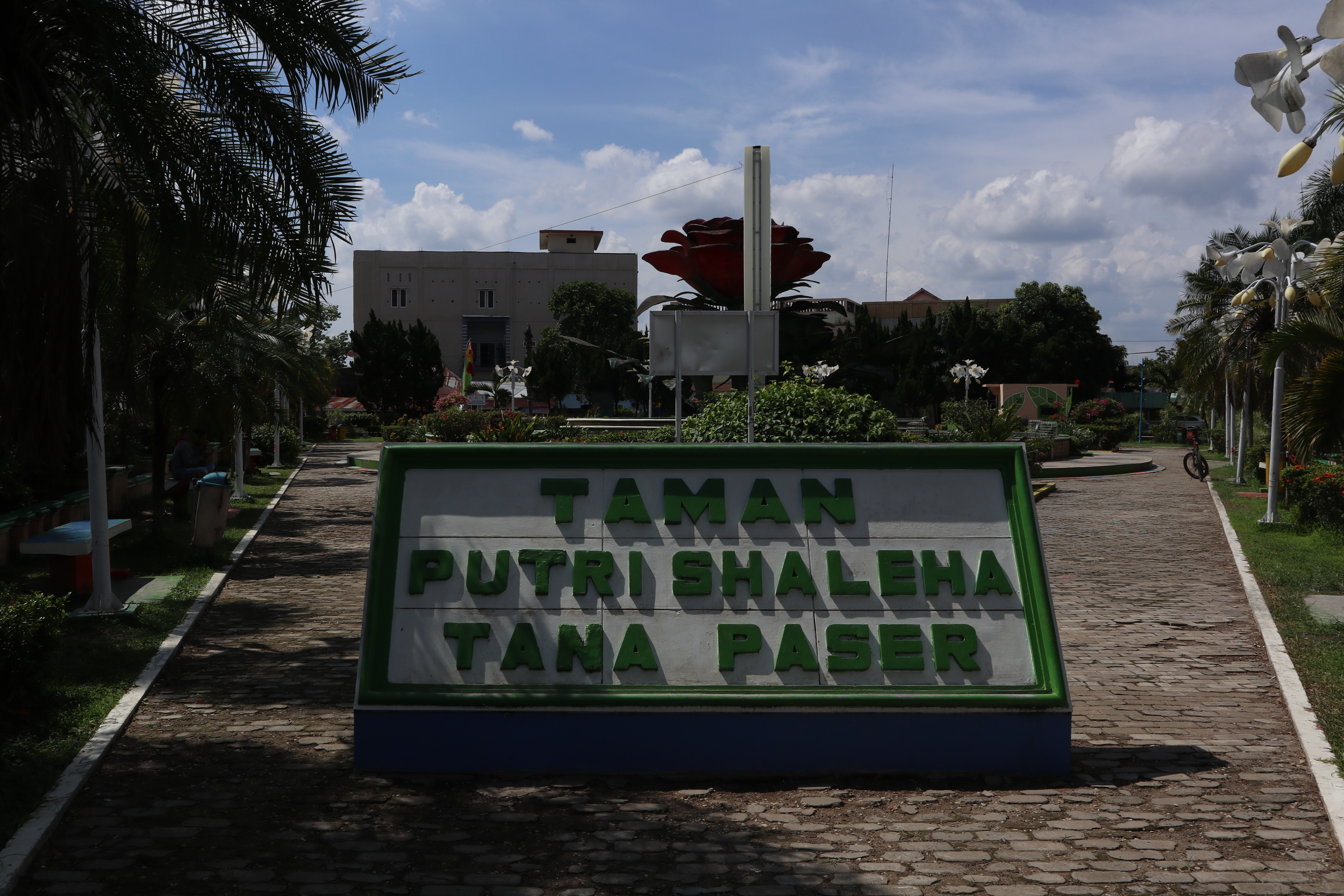
Shaleha Princess Park

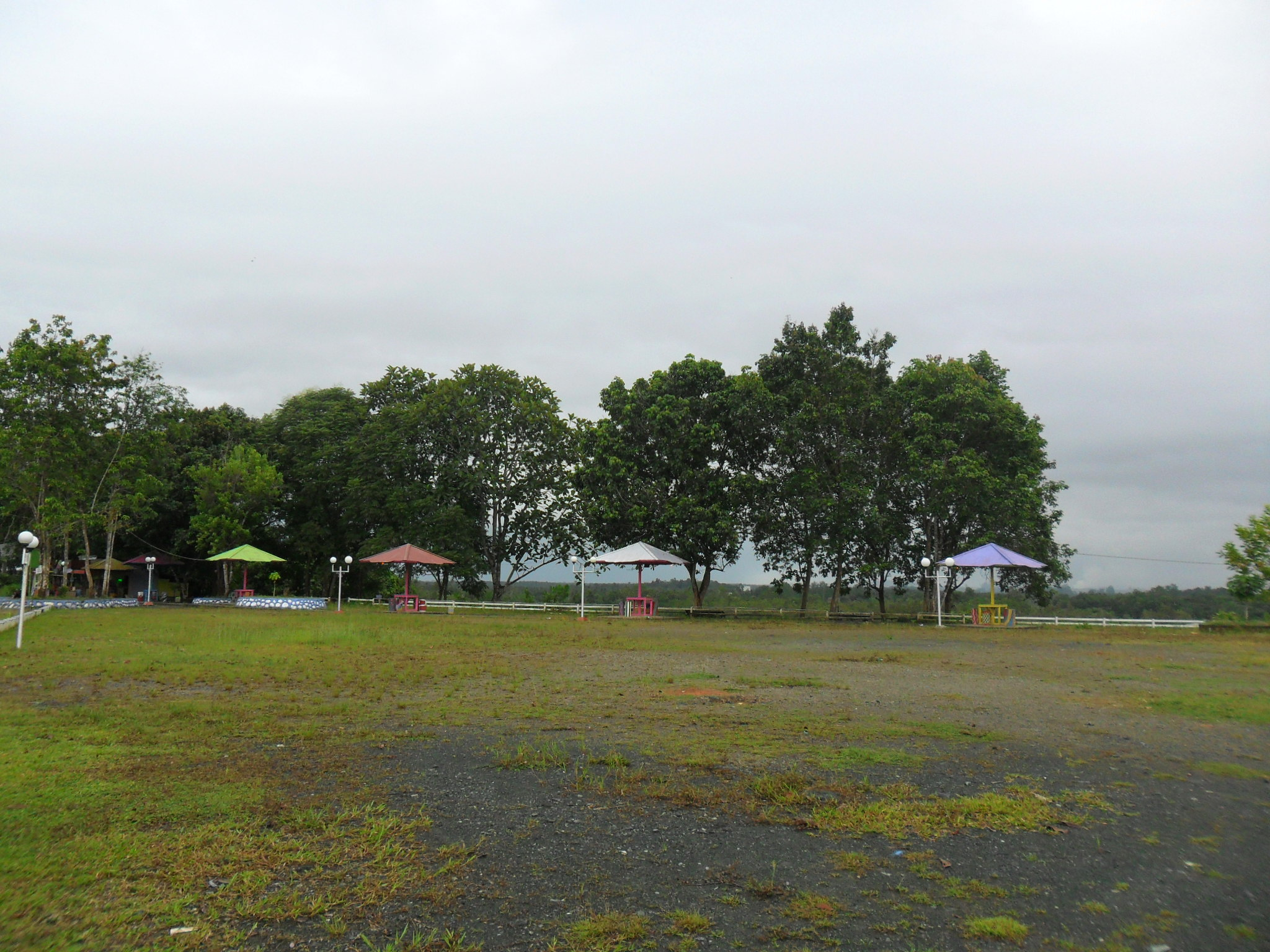
Amber Nature Park

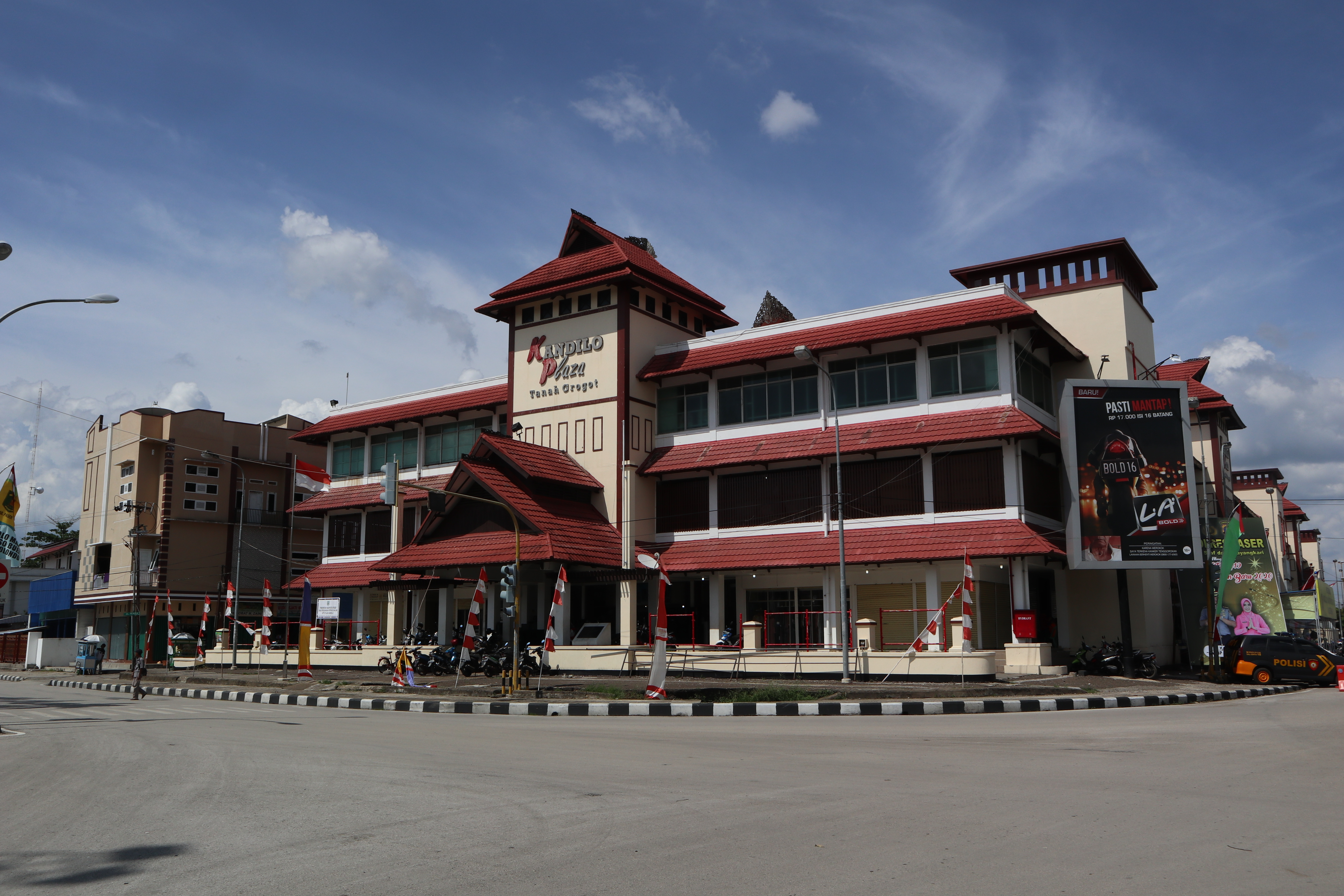
Kandilo Plaza

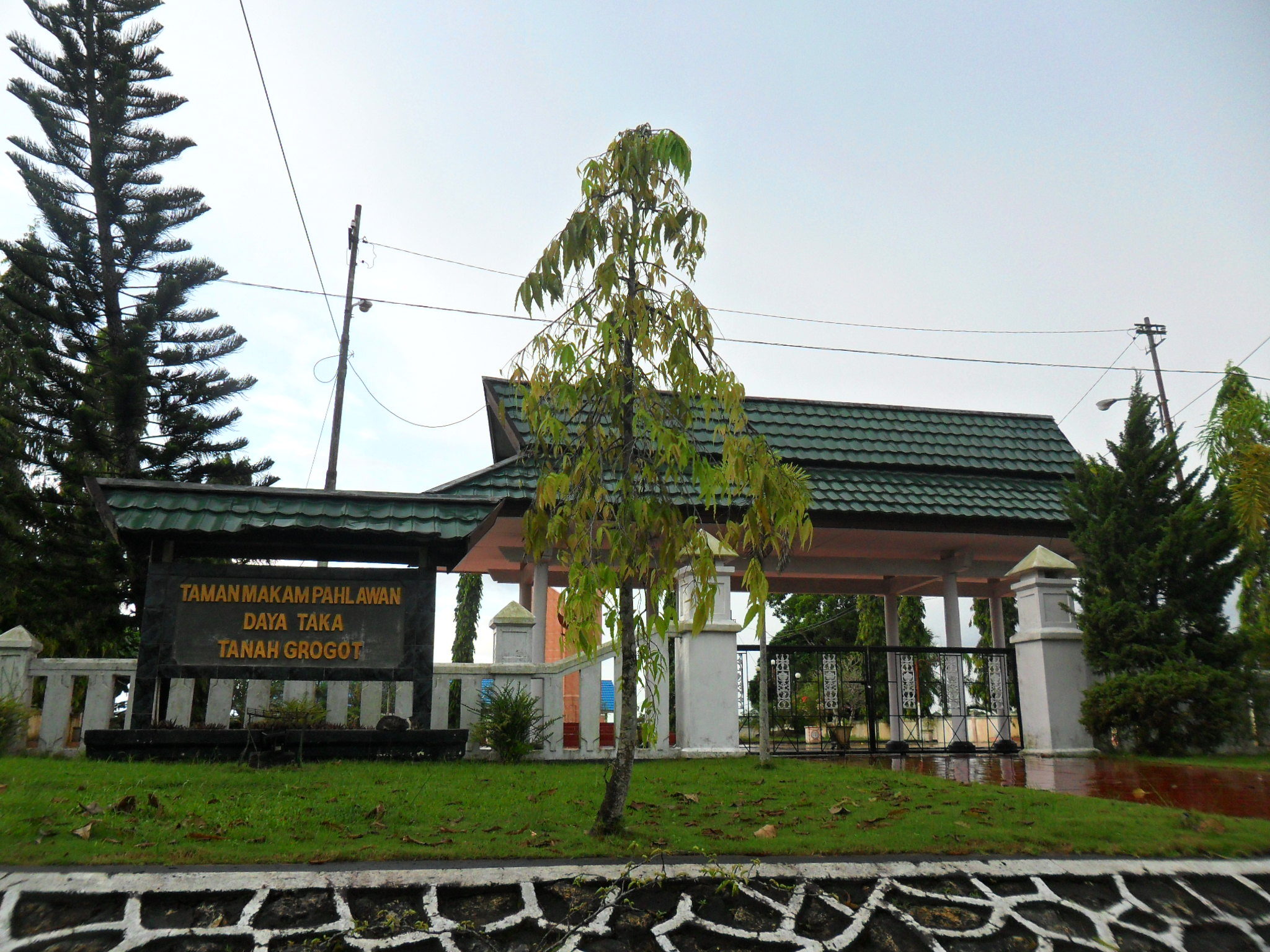
TMP Daya Taka
