= Tanjung Harapan, Solok =

Tanjung Harapan
- District
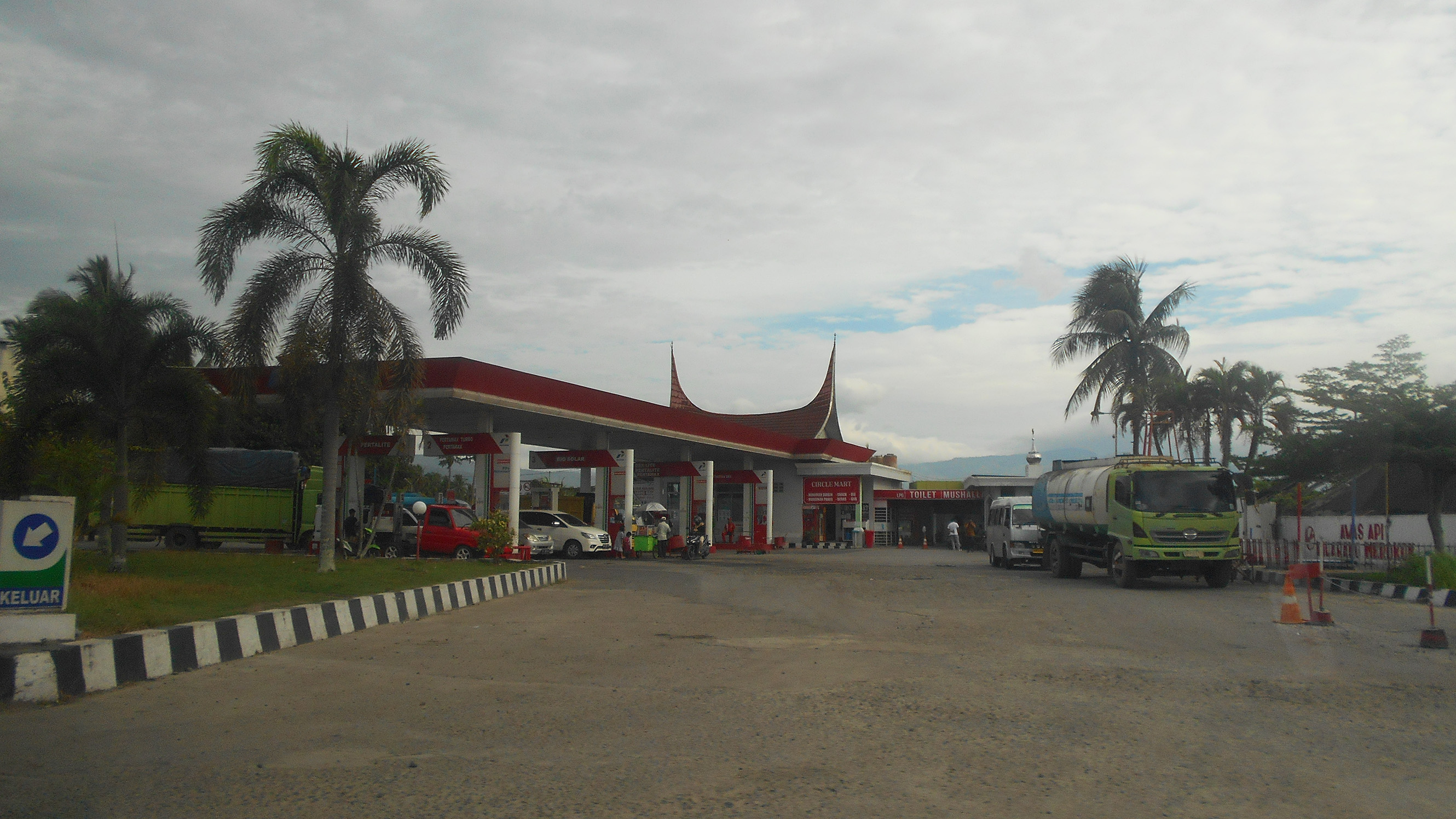
- Gas station in Pasar Pandan Air Mati
- Interactive map of Tanjung Harapan
- Location within West Sumatra Location within Sumatra Location within Indonesia
- Coordinates: 0°46′59.11129″S 100°39′44.07869″E
- Country: Indonesia
- Province: West Sumatra
- City: City of Solok
- District seat: Tanjung Paku

Area
  - Total: 22.74 km^{2} (8.78 sq mi)

Population (2023)
  - Total: 34,570
  - Density: 1,520/km^{2} (3,937/sq mi)

Tanjung Harapan is a district (kecamatan) in Solok City, West Sumatra province, Indonesia.

Tanjung Harapan is one of two districts in Solok City. It is part of Solok City, not Solok Regency. As of 2023, it was inhabited by 34,570 people, and has a total area of 22.74 km^{2}. Its district seat is located in the village of Tanjung Paku

== Governance ==
=== Villages ===
Tanjung Harapan consists of six urban villages (kelurahan):

- Koto Panjang
- Pasar Pandan Air Mati
- Tanjung Paku
- Nan Balimo
- Kampung Jawa
- Laing
