= Long Ikis =

- District
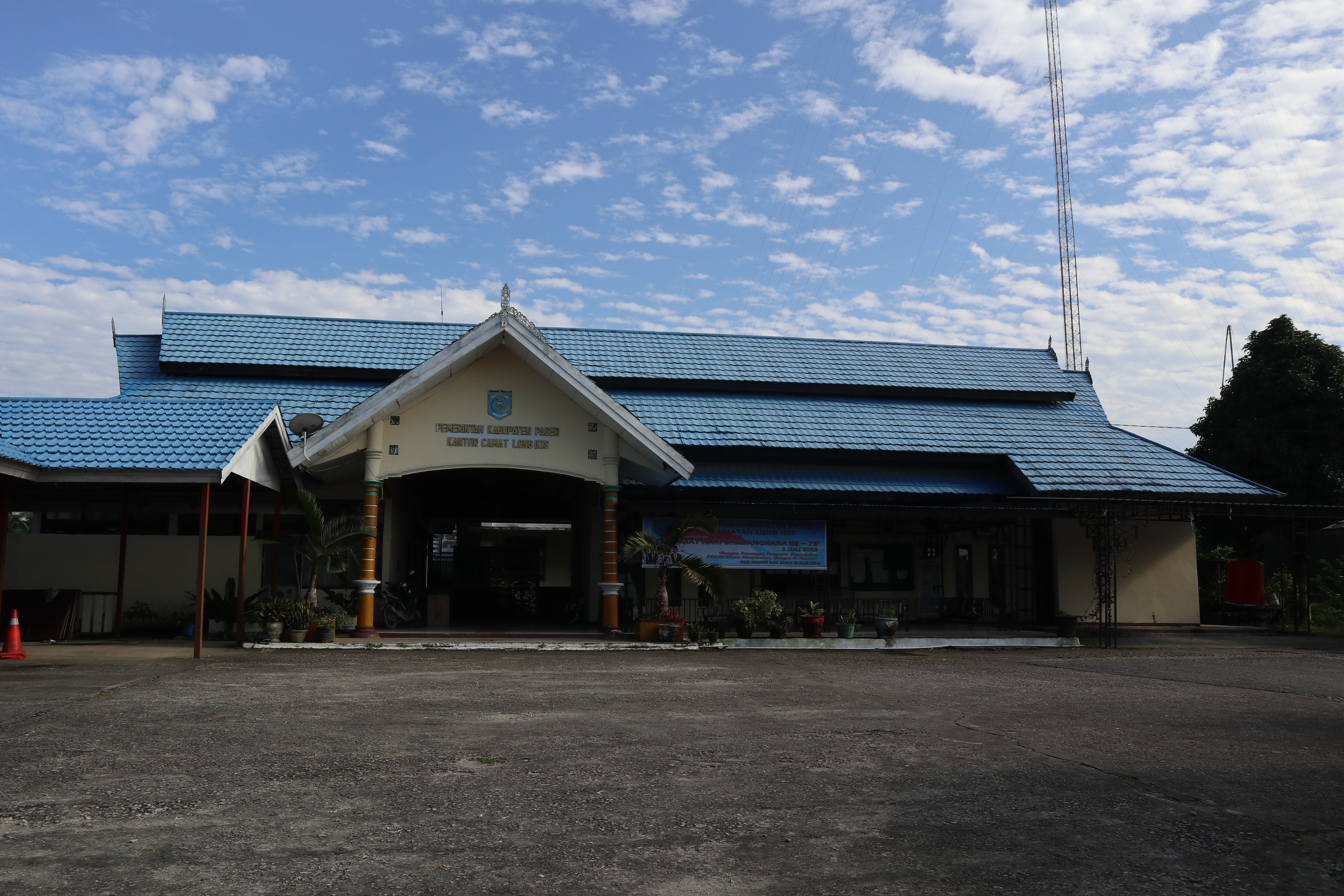
- Long Ikis district office
- Interactive map of Long Ikis
- Location within East Kalimantan Location within Kalimantan Location within Indonesia
- Coordinates: 1°34′55.99164″S 116°11′59.87339″E
- Country: Indonesia
- Province: East Kalimantan
- Regency: Paser
- District seat: Long Ikis

Area
  - Total: 1,204.22 km^{2} (464.95 sq mi)

Population (2023)
  - Total: 44,140
  - Density: 36.65/km^{2} (94.93/sq mi)
- Time zone: UTC+08:00 (ICT)
- Postal code: 76282
- Regional code: 64.01.06

Long Ikis is a district in Paser Regency, East Kalimantan, Indonesia. The district covers an area of 1,204.22 km^{2}, and had a population of 44,140 at the 2023 estimate.

== Governance ==
=== Villages ===
Long Ikis is divided into 26 villages, consisting of 1 urban village (kelurahan) and 25 rural villages (desa):

Regional code (Kode wilayah)	Name	Area (km^{2})	Population (2023)	RT (rukun tetangga)
64.01.06.1001	Long Ikis	5.70	1,684	6
64.01.06.2002	Muara Adang	109.74	1,944	7
64.01.06.2003	Teluk Waru	113.67	981	8
64.01.06.2004	Tajur	118.39	3,009	24
64.01.06.2005	Samuntai	90.51	4,203	16
64.01.06.2006	Lombok	82.61	2,134	8
64.01.06.2007	Pait	65.65	4,420	11
64.01.06.2008	Olung	30.58	1,759	16
64.01.06.2009	Kayungo	38.75	1,254	6
64.01.06.2010	Jemparing	26.13	1,949	10
64.01.06.2011	Tiwei	227.47	909	5
64.01.06.2012	Belimbing	85.62	733	4
64.01.06.2013	Long Gelang	117.18	646	3
64.01.06.2014	Krayan Jaya	7.80	1,021	11
64.01.06.2015	Bukit Seloka	6.50	1,313	10
64.01.06.2016	Krayan Sentosa	7.80	1,608	12
64.01.06.2017	Krayan Makmur	6.50	944	10
64.01.06.2018	Kayungo Sari	10.16	1,740	12
64.01.06.2019	Krayan Bahagia	10.00	2,221	10
64.01.06.2020	Sawit Jaya	9.23	2,727	11
64.01.06.2021	Sekurou Jaya	6.84	1,543	8
64.01.06.2022	Kerta Bhakti	11.24	1,689	14
64.01.06.2023	Adang Jaya	6.00	515	11
64.01.06.2024	Tajer Mulya	10.15	1,753	18
64.01.06.2025	Brewe	N/A	350	3
64.01.06.2026	Atang Pait	N/A	1,091	5
	Totals	1,204.22	44,140	259
