= Tanjung Harapan, Paser =

Tanjung Harapan
- District
- Interactive map of Tanjung Harapan
- Location within East Kalimantan Location within Kalimantan Location within Indonesia
- Coordinates: 2°11′48.1704″S 116°35′24.8964″E
- Country: Indonesia
- Province: East Kalimantan
- Regency: Paser
- District seat: Tanjung Aru

Area
  - Total: 714.05 km^{2} (275.70 sq mi)

Population (2023)
  - Total: 10,410
  - Density: 14.58/km^{2} (37.76/sq mi)

Tanjung Harapan is a district in Paser Regency, East Kalimantan Province, Indonesia. The district covers an area of 714.05 km^{2}, including the offshore islands of Batukapal Island, Burung Island, and Merayap Island, and had a population of 10,410 at the 2023 estimate.

== Governance ==
=== Villages ===
Tanjung Harapan consists of seven village (desa):

- Keladen
- Tanjung Aru
- Labuangkallo
- Lori
- Selengot
- Random
- Senipah
