= Paser Regency =

Regency in East Kalimantan, Indonesia

Paser Regency Kabupaten Paser
- Regency
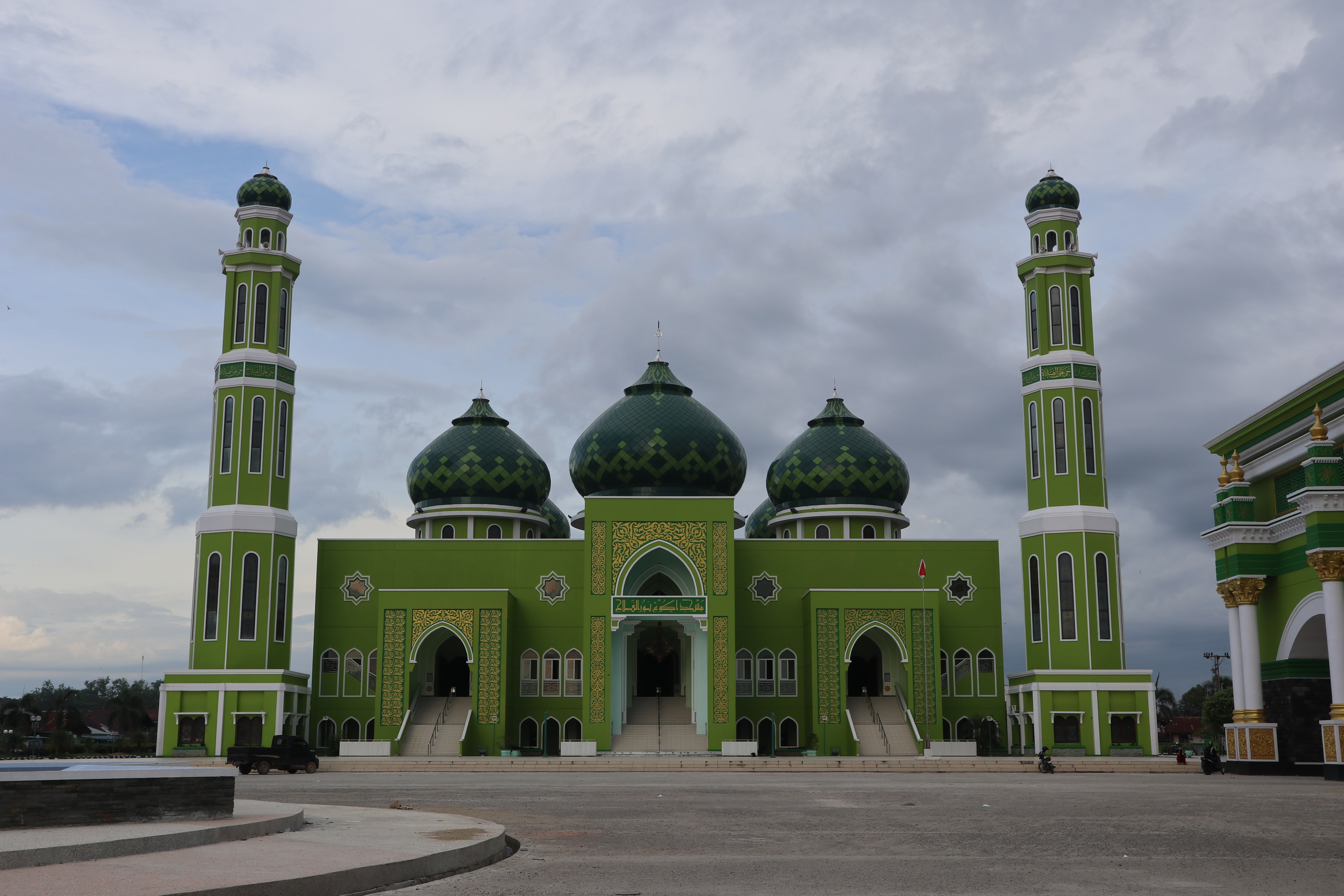
- Nurul Falah Grand Mosque

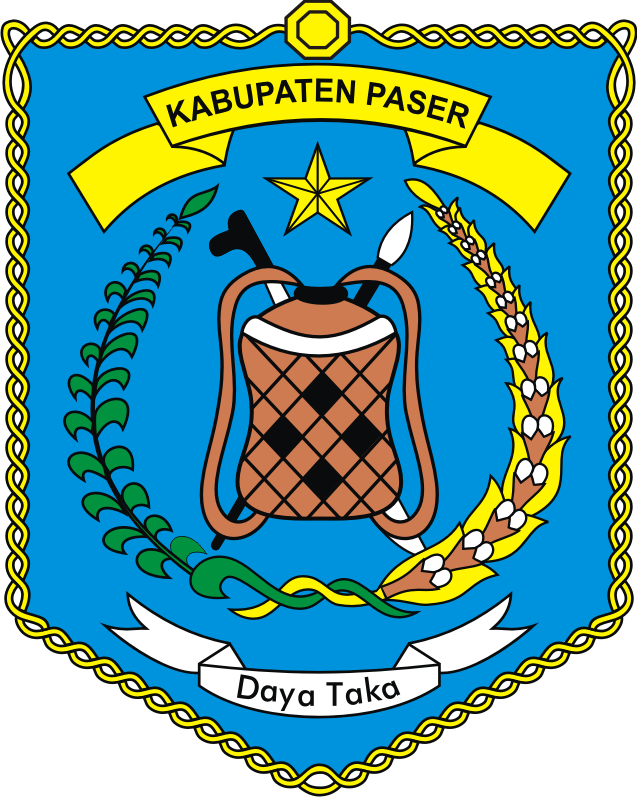
- Coat of arms
- Motto(s): Daya Taka (Paser) "The determination of the community will continue to fight with enthusiasm, sincerity and piety to work with their own abilities"
- Location within East Kalimantan

- Location in Kalimantan and Indonesia Paser Regency (Indonesia)
- Coordinates: 1°26′6.61″S 116°14′7.26″E
- Country: Indonesia
- Province: East Kalimantan
- Capital: Tana Paser

Government
  - Regent: Fahmi Fadli
  - Vice Regent: Ikhwan Antasari

Area
  - Total: 11,603.94 km^{2} (4,480.31 sq mi)
- Elevation: 0 m (0 ft)

Population (mid 2025 estimate)
  - Total: 315,033
  - Density: 27.1488/km^{2} (70.3151/sq mi)
- Time zone: UTC+8 (ICST)
- Area code: (+62) 543
- Website: paserkab.go.id

Paser Regency (Indonesian: Kabupaten Paser; pronounced [kabuˌpat̪ɛn ˈpasɛr]) is the southernmost regency in the East Kalimantan province of Indonesia. It was created on 26 June 1959 from the northern parts of Kotabaru Regency. It was previously known as Pasir Regency until its renaming on 22 August 2007. Its northeastern districts were split off on 10 April 2002 to form the new Penajam North Paser Regency. The residual regency covers an area of 11,603.94 km^{2}, and it had a population of 230,316 at the 2010 Census and 275,452 at the 2020 Census; the official estimate as at mid 2025 was 315,033 (comprising 49.134% males and 50.866% females). Its administrative centre is the town of Tana Paser (or Tanah Grogot).

== History ==
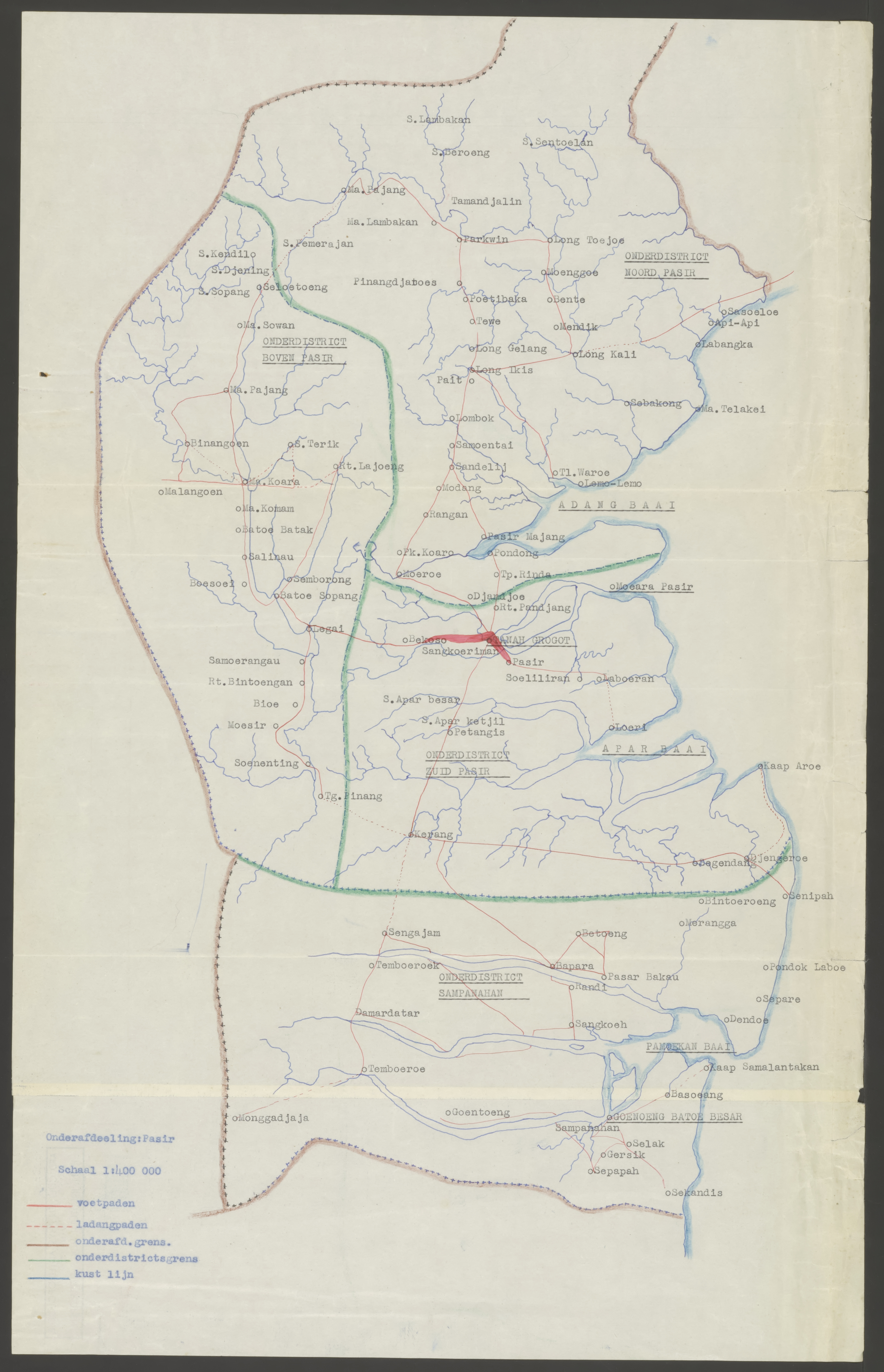
Map of Onderafdeeling Pasir

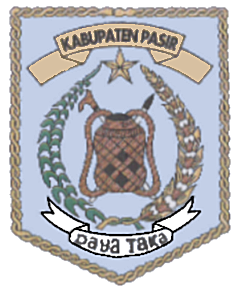
Former coat of arms until renaming in 2007

On 26 June 1959, Pasir was first established as a regency in East Kalimantan, after being separated from Kotabaru in South Kalimantan, for "historic and social-economic reasons". At the time of its formation, it originally consisted of four districts as mentioned: Central Pasir, North Pasir (not to be confused with Penajam North Paser), Pasir Hulu, and South Pasir. Meanwhile, it largely inherited the borders from Onderafdeeling Pasir, with the exception of parts south of modern East Kalimantan–South Kalimantan border (still part of Kotabaru till this day). Little are known the archives relating to its separation from South Kalimantan.

Twenty-eight years later, on 13 October 1987, Pasir annexed the district of Penajam, then known as Balikpapan Seberang. Four northeastern districts, namely Penajam, Sepaku (created in 1996), Waru, and Babulu (also created in 1996), were later separated on 10 April 2002 to form Penajam North Paser. On 22 August 2007, Pasir was officially renamed to Paser by the regional government.

== Boundaries ==
- North : West Kutai Regency and Penajam North Paser Regency
- East : Makassar Strait
- South : Kota Baru Regency
- West : Balangan Regency, Tabalong Regency, and North Barito Regency

== Administrative districts ==
Following the separation of the districts in the northeast to form the new Penajam North Paser Regency on 10 April 2002, the residual Paser Regency is now divided into ten districts (kecamatan), tabulated below with their areas and their populations at the 2010 Census and the 2020 Census, together with the official estimates as of mid 2025. The table also includes the locations of the district administrative centres, the number of administrative villages in each district (totalling 5 urban kelurahan and 139 rural desa), and its postal codes.

Proposals have been under consideration for the existing regency to be split in two, with separate regencies being formed for South Paser and for Central Paser. The proposed South Paser Regency (Indonesian: Kabupaten Paser Selatan) would comprise five districts in the south and west (specifically Batu Sopang, Muara Komam, Muara Samu, Batu Engau and Tanjung Harapan) with its capital at Batu Sopang, a combined area of 5,941.34 km^{2} and a population of 86,886 as at mid 2025. The proposed Central Paser Regency (Indonesian: Kabupaten Paser Tengah) would comprise five districts in the centre and east (specifically Long Kali, Long Ikis, Kuaro, Tanah Grogot and Pasir Belonglong) with its capital at Kuaro, a combined area of 5,662.60 km^{2} and a population of 228,147 as at mid 2025.

Kode Wilayah	Name of District (kecamatan)	Area in km^{2}	Pop'n Census 2010	Pop'n Census 2020	Pop'n Estimate mid 2025	Admin centre	No. of villages	Post code
64.01.01	Batu Sopang	1,111.38	22,540	26,867	30,817	Batu Kajang	9	76252
64.01.10	Muara Samu	855.25	4,221	6,855	8,242	Muser	9	76250
64.01.09	Batu Engau	1,507.26	11,662	16,969	22,123	Kerang	13	76261
64.01.02	Tanjung Harapan ^{(a)}	714.05	7,720	8,856	10,946	Tanjung Aru	7	76260
64.01.03	Paser Belengkong	990.11	23,543	28,595	32,298	Pasir Belengkong	15	76271
64.01.04	Tanah Grogot ^{(b)}	335.58	63,311	76,344	88,841	Tanah Grogot	^{(c)} 17	76251
64.01.05	Kuaro	747.30	23,934	29,188	32,572	Kuaro	^{(c)} 14	76281
64.01.06	Long Ikis ^{(d)}	1,204.22	36,701	41,147	44,993	Long Ikis	^{(c)} 27	76282
64.01.07	Muara Komam	1,753.40	12,459	13,056	14,758	Muara Koman	^{(c)} 14	76253
64.01.08	Long Kali	2,385.39	24,225	27,575	29,443	Long Kali	^{(c)} 24	76283
	Totals	11,603.94	230,316	275,452	315,033	Tanah Grogot	144	

Note: (a) including the offshore islands of Pulau Batukapal, Pulau Burung and Pulau Merayap.
(b) including the offshore islands of Pulau Rantau Besar and Pulau Rantau Kecil ("Great and Little Rantau Islands").
(c) includes one urban kelurahan - the district admin centre (the rest being desa). (d) including the offshore island of Pulau Bansik.

== Climate ==
Tana Paser has a tropical rainforest climate (Af) with moderate rainfall in August and September and heavy to very heavy rainfall in the remaining months.

Climate data for Tana Paser
Month	Jan	Feb	Mar	Apr	May	Jun	Jul	Aug	Sep	Oct	Nov	Dec	Year
Mean daily maximum °C (°F)	29.6 (85.3)	30.1 (86.2)	30.2 (86.4)	30.3 (86.5)	30.2 (86.4)	29.8 (85.6)	29.4 (84.9)	30.0 (86.0)	30.3 (86.5)	30.7 (87.3)	30.2 (86.4)	29.8 (85.6)	30.1 (86.1)
Daily mean °C (°F)	26.2 (79.2)	26.5 (79.7)	26.5 (79.7)	26.7 (80.1)	26.7 (80.1)	26.4 (79.5)	25.9 (78.6)	26.3 (79.3)	26.6 (79.9)	26.9 (80.4)	26.5 (79.7)	26.3 (79.3)	26.5 (79.6)
Mean daily minimum °C (°F)	22.8 (73.0)	22.9 (73.2)	22.9 (73.2)	23.1 (73.6)	23.3 (73.9)	23.0 (73.4)	22.5 (72.5)	22.7 (72.9)	22.9 (73.2)	23.1 (73.6)	22.9 (73.2)	22.9 (73.2)	22.9 (73.2)
Average rainfall mm (inches)	307 (12.1)	258 (10.2)	358 (14.1)	322 (12.7)	213 (8.4)	210 (8.3)	201 (7.9)	117 (4.6)	118 (4.6)	129 (5.1)	210 (8.3)	303 (11.9)	2,746 (108.2)
Source: Climate-Data.org
