= Indonesian Democratic Party of Struggle =

Populist political party in Indonesia

Indonesian Democratic Party of Struggle Partai Demokrasi Indonesia Perjuangan
- Abbreviation: PDI-P/PDIP; PDI Perjuangan
- General Chairwoman: Megawati Sukarnoputri
- Secretary-General: Hasto Kristiyanto
- DPR group leader: Utut Adianto
- Founders: Megawati Sukarnoputri; Kwik Kian Gie; Eros Djarot; Sabam Sirait; Alexander Litaay
- Founded: 10 January 1973; 53 years ago (as PDI) 15 February 1999; 27 years ago (as PDI-P)
- Split from: Indonesian Democratic Party
- Headquarters: Menteng, Central Jakarta, Jakarta
- Youth wing: BMI (Indonesian Young Bulls); TMP (Red-White Cadets)
- Muslim wing: BAMUSI (Indonesian Muslims Abode)
- Chinese wing: KITA Perjuangan (Indonesian Chinese Community of Struggle)
- Membership (2024): 472,643
- Ideology: Pancasila; Indonesian nationalism; Sukarnoism; Marhaenism; Social democracy; Populism; Progressivism; Secularism; Social liberalism; Economic nationalism; Factions: Left-wing populism; Pro-government Pro-Megawati Catch-all; Civic nationalism
- Political position: Centre to centre-left Factions: Left-wing
- National affiliation: None Former: Alliance of Parties; (2023–2024); Onward Indonesia Coalition; (2018–2023); Great Indonesia Coalition; (2014–2018); Mega-Prabowo (PDI-P Coalition); (2009–2014); National Coalition; (2004–2009)
- International affiliation: Progressive Alliance
- Regional affiliation: Network of Social Democracy in Asia; Council of Asian Liberals and Democrats
- Colours: Red
- Slogan: Kerja Kita, Kerja Indonesia (Our Work, Indonesia's Work)
- Anthem: Hymne PDI-P (PDI-P Hymn); Mars PDI-P (PDI-P March)
- Ballot number: 3
- DPR: 110 / 580 (19%)
- DPRD I: 389 / 2,372 (16%)
- DPRD II: 2,810 / 17,510 (16%)

Website
- pdiperjuangan.id

The Indonesian Democratic Party of Struggle (Indonesian: Partai Demokrasi Indonesia Perjuangan, PDI-P) is a centre to centre-left, populist-secular-nationalist political party in Indonesia. Since 2014, it has been the ruling and largest party in the House of Representatives (DPR), having won 110 seats in the latest election (2024). The party is led by Megawati Sukarnoputri, who served as the president of Indonesia from 2001 to 2004.

In 1996, Megawati was forced out of the leadership of the Indonesian Democratic Party (PDI) by the New Order government under Suharto. After Suharto's resignation and the lifting of restrictions on political parties, she founded the party. PDI-P won the 1999 legislative election, and Megawati assumed the presidency in July 2001, replacing Abdurrahman Wahid. Following the end of her term, PDI-P became the opposition during the Susilo Bambang Yudhoyono (SBY) administration. Megawati ran with Prabowo Subianto in 2009, but they were defeated by SBY. In 2014, PDI-P nominated Joko Widodo (Jokowi) as its presidential candidate. The party returned to power following its victory in the legislative election, and Jokowi was elected president. PDI-P continued its success in 2019, and Jokowi was re-elected for his second term. In 2024, the party won the legislative election, but its presidential candidate, Ganjar Pranowo, lost to Prabowo, who ran with Jokowi's son Gibran Rakabuming Raka. Jokowi's alleged support for Prabowo strained his relationship with PDI-P, leading to his formal ousting (along with Gibran and his son-in-law Bobby Nasution) in December 2024, months after the Constitutional Court (MK) rejected all claims.

It is a member of the Council of Asian Liberals and Democrats, the Network of Social Democracy in Asia, and the Progressive Alliance.

== History ==
=== Origins ===
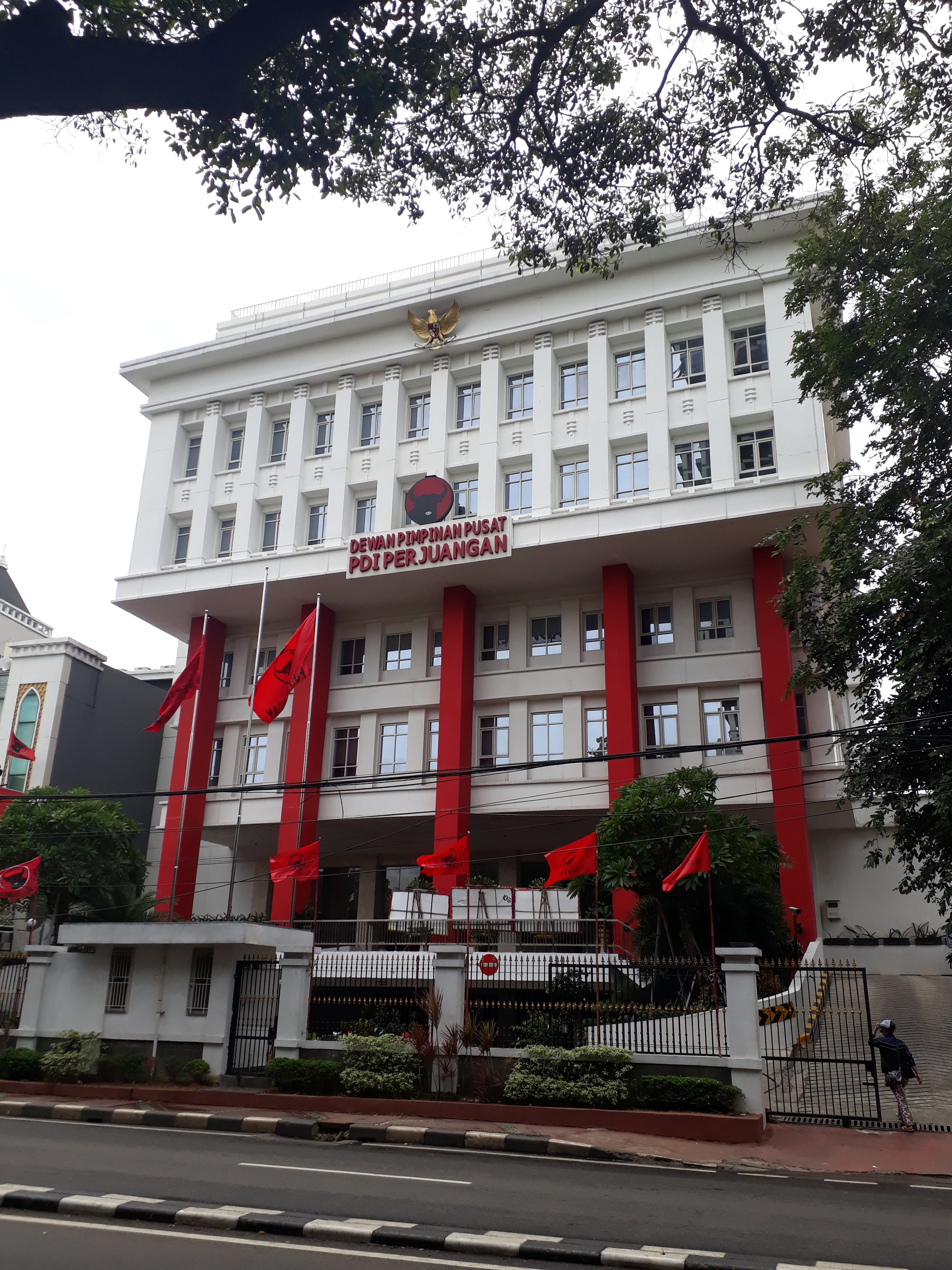
Party head office on Jalan Diponegoro, Menteng, Jakarta

At the 1993 National Congress, Megawati Sukarnoputri was elected Chairperson of the Indonesian Democratic Party, one of the three political parties recognised by President Suharto's "New Order" government. This result was not recognised by the government, which continued to push for Budi Harjono, its preferred candidate for the chairpersonship, to be elected. A Special Congress was held where the government expected to have Harjono elected, but Megawati once again emerged as elected leader. Her position was consolidated further when a PDI National Assembly ratified the results of the congress.

In June 1996, another National Congress was held in the city of Medan, to which Megawati was not invited; anti-Megawati members were in attendance. With the government's backing, Suryadi, a former chairperson was re-elected as PDI's Chairperson. Megawati refused to acknowledge the results of this congress and continued to see herself as the rightful leader of the PDI.

On the morning of 27 July 1996, Suryadi threatened to take back PDI's headquarters in Jakarta. Suryadi's supporters (reportedly with the Government's backing) attacked the PDI Headquarters and faced resistance from Megawati supporters who had been stationed there since the National Congress in Medan. In the ensuing clash, Megawati's supporters managed to hold on to the headquarters. A riot ensued – at that stage considered the worst that Jakarta had seen during the "New Order" – which was followed by a government crackdown. The government later blamed the riots on the Democratic People's Party (PRD). Despite being overthrown as chairperson by Suryadi and the government, the event lifted Megawati's profile immensely, providing both sympathy and national popularity.

The PDI was now divided into two factions, Megawati's and Suryadi's. The former had wanted to participate in the 1997 legislative elections, but the government only recognized the latter. In the elections, Megawati and her supporters threw their support behind the United Development Party and the PDI won only 3% of the vote. Following Suharto's resignation and the lifting of the "New Order" limitations on national political parties, Megawati declared the formation of the PDI-P, adding the suffix perjuangan ("struggle") to differentiate her faction of the party from the government-backed faction. She was elected chairperson of PDI-P and was nominated for the presidency in 1999. De facto, PDI-P became a transformation or re-establishment of PDI and not a split.

=== 1999–2004: Election victory, the Wahid–Megawati administrations, and splits ===
PDI-P was by far the most popular political party coming into the 1999 legislative elections. With 33% of the votes, PDI-P emerged with the largest share. As the 1999 People's Consultative Assembly (MPR) General Session loomed closer, it was expected that PDI-P would once again play the dominant role. Despite winning the legislative elections, PDI-P did not have absolute majority. Despite this, however, PDI-P never formed a coalition with any of the other political parties in the lead-up to the 1999 MPR General Session. The closest PDI-P had to a coalition was a loose alliance with Abdurrahman Wahid's National Awakening Party (PKB). The presidency looked set to be contested by Megawati and the then incumbent B. J. Habibie of Golkar who was looking for a second term. However, MPR chairman Amien Rais had other ideas as he formed a coalition called the Central Axis which consisted of Muslim parties. Amien also announced that he would like to nominate Wahid as president. PKB, their alliance with PDI-P never cemented, now moved over to the Central Axis. Golkar then joined this coalition after Habibie's accountability speech was rejected and he withdrew from the race. It came down to Megawati and Wahid. Wahid, with a powerful coalition backing him, was elected as Indonesia's 4th president with 373 votes to Megawati's 313. The PDI-P supporters were outraged. As the winners of the legislative elections, they also expected to win the presidential elections. PDI-P masses began rioting in cities such as Jakarta, Solo and Medan. The normally peaceful Bali was also involved in pro-Megawati protests. Wahid then realized that there was a need to recognize PDI-P's status as the winners of the Legislative Elections. With that, he encouraged Megawati to run for the vice presidency. Megawati rejected this offer when she saw that she had to face opponents such as United Development Party's (PPP) Hamzah Haz and Golkar's Akbar Tanjung and Wiranto. After some politicking by Wahid, Akbar and Wiranto withdrew from the race. Wahid also ordered PKB to throw their weight behind Megawati. She was now confident and competed in the vice presidential elections, and was elected with 396 votes to Hamzah's 284.

The First PDI-P Congress was held in Semarang, Central Java in April 2000, during which Megawati was re-elected as the chairperson of PDI-P for a second term. The congress was noted as one where she consolidated her position within PDI-P by taking harsh measures to remove potential rivals. During the election for the chairperson, two other candidates emerged, Eros Djarot and Dimyati Hartono. Both ran because they did not want Megawati to hold the PDI-P chairpersonship while concurrently being Vice President. For Eros, when finally received his nomination from the South Jakarta branch, membership problems arose and made his nomination void. He was then not allowed to go and participate in the congress. Disillusioned with what he perceived to be a cult of personality developing around Megawati, Eros left PDI-P and in July 2002, formed the Freedom Bull National Party. For Dimyati, although his candidacy was not opposed as harshly as Eros', he was removed from his position as Head of PDI-P's Central Branch. He kept his position as a People's Representative Council (DPR) member but retired in February 2002. In April 2002, Dimyati formed the Our Homeland of Indonesia Party (PITA).

Although it had not supported Wahid for presidency, PDI-P members received ministerial positions in his cabinet because of Megawati's position as vice president. As time went on, much like the Central Axis that had supported Wahid, PDI-P would grow disillusioned with him. In April 2000, Laksamana Sukardi, a PDI-P member who held position as Minister of Investments and State Owned Enterprises was sacked from his position. When PDI-P enquired as to why this was done, Wahid claimed it was because of corruption but never backed up his claim. The relationship improved somewhat when later in the year, when Wahid authorized Megawati to manage the day-to-day running of the government. However, she and PDI-P had slowly but surely started to distance themselves from Wahid and join forces with the Central Axis. Finally, in July 2001 at a Special Session of the MPR, Wahid was removed as president. Megawati was then elected as president to replace him with Hamzah as her vice president, becoming Indonesia's first female president. They party, however, faced further splits after Megawati became president with more disillusioned members leaving the party. Two of them were Megawati's own sisters. In May 2002, Sukmawati Sukarnoputri formed the Indonesian National Party Marhaenism (PNI-Marhaenisme). This was followed in November 2002, with Rachmawati Sukarnoputri declaring the formation of the Pioneers' Party (PP).

=== 2004–2014: Opposition to the Yudhoyono administration ===
By 2004, the reformist sentiments that had led PDI-P to victory in the 1999 elections had died down. Many were disappointed with what the reform process had achieved thus far and were also disappointed with Megawati's presidency. This was reflected in the 2004 legislative election, PDI-P obtained 18.5% of the total vote, down from the 33.7% it obtained in 1999. PDI-P nominated Megawati as its presidential candidate for the 2004 presidential election. Several running mates were considered, including Hamzah Haz (to renew the partnership), Susilo Bambang Yudhoyono (SBY), and Jusuf Kalla. Megawati eventually selected Nahdatul Ulama chairman Hasyim Muzadi as her running mate. It was expected that she would appeal to nationalist sentiments while Hasyim would appeal to Islamist voters. In the first round of elections, the pairing came second to SBY/Kalla. To improve their chances in the run-off, the PDI-P formed a coalition with the PPP, Golkar, the Reform Star Party (PBR) and the Prosperous Peace Party (PDS) in August 2004. However, they were defeated in the run-off against SBY/Kalla. The National Coalition then turned their eyes on being the opposition in the DPR for the SBY/Kalla government. With Kalla's election as chairman of Golkar, Golkar defected to the government's side, leaving the PDI-P as the only major opposition party in the DPR.

On 28 March 2005, the second PDI-P Congress was held in Sanur, Bali where Megawati was re-elected to the chairpersonship for a third term. Her brother, Guruh Sukarnoputra, was chosen as head of the party's Education and Culture department. This congress was noted for the formation of a faction called the Renewal of PDI-P Movement. It called for a renewal of the party leadership if it was to win the 2009 legislative elections. Although they attended the Congress, the members left once Megawati was re-elected. In December 2005, these same members would form the Democratic Renewal Party (PDP).

The party came third in the 2009 legislative election with 14% of the votes. It had 95 seats in the DPR. Megawati was chosen as the presidential candidate, this time with a coalition between the Great Indonesia Movement Party and PDI-P themselves, with Prabowo Subianto as her running mate. They lost to SBY, with Boediono as vice-president, who won 26.6% of the vote.

=== 2014–2023: Return to power, the Jokowi administration, and factional rivalry ===
Initially there were wide speculations that Megawati will run again for the third time during the 2014 presidential election. However, during 2012, PDI-P suffered a leadership dilemma as there were fears within the party that Megawati might not win even if strong internal party support can be clearly seen. In an internal party survey by Poltracking in December 2013, many respondents preferred Joko Widodo to run as the party's nominee rather than Megawati while an external survey done by CSIS earlier at May shown Jokowi to be the frontrunner. Megawati would announce that she will not run for president in 2013, citing regeneration as her reasoning. Despite having an agreement with Gerindra that they will support Prabowo Subianto's bid for president, PDI-P decided to nominate Jokowi as their candidate for president on March 14, 2014. PDI-P will later form a coalition with Hanura, NasDem, and PKB on 19 May 2014 to support Jokowi's candidacy and announced Jusuf Kalla as his running mate. The pairing won with 53.15% of the vote, and PDI-P returned as the largest party in the DPR, winning nearly 19% of the vote.

Relations between the party and Jokowi however weren't always smooth. PDI-P criticize Jokowi for policy weaknesses, and PDI-P legislator Effendi Simbolon called for his impeachment. On a party congress held on 9 April 2015, chairwoman Megawati referred Jokowi as a functionary, saying that as the nominee of PDI-P, Jokowi should carry out PDI-P's policy line and he owed the party the presidency. Several months prior, Jokowi had "offended" Megawati after having a dispute over the nomination of Budi Gunawan, her former ajudant, as the Chief of the Indonesian National Police by supporting Badrodin Haiti after Budi Gunawan got implicated by a corruption case. Because of Jokowi's decision to back Badrodin Haiti and later Tito Karnavian, he was jeered by party cadres.

In April 2019, incumbent president Joko Widodo was the party's presidential candidate running for a second term, with Ma'ruf Amin as his running mate. The pair was supported with this time, a larger coalition with Golkar, United Development Party, Perindo, and PSI declaring their support together with the existing coalition members. Widodo won a second term with 55.50% of the vote. PDI-P remained the largest party in the DPR, winning 19.33% of the vote.

In preparation for the 2024 Indonesian general election, the party split over the choice of a presidential candidate. Younger party members opposed Puan Maharani, the preferred candidate of the older establishment, in favor of Ganjar Pranowo. Despite his popularity, Pranowo declared he wouldn't run. On 9 October 2021, Bambang Wuryanto urged unity under the Banteng (Javanese for "bull") command for Maharani supporters, labeling dissenters as Celeng (Javanese for "wild boar"). In response, young members launched the Barisan Celeng Berjuang ("Fighting Boars Front") campaign on 12 October 2021, criticizing Wuryanto and the Central Board. They adopted a flag with an inverted color scheme as a symbol of defiance. On 15 October 2021, the PDI-P Central Board sanctioned members from both sides for attempting to bypass the leadership's decision-making process, emphasizing that only Megawati could decide the official presidential nominee and urging an end to the rivalry.

=== 2023–present: Ganjar's nomination, worsening ties between PDI-P and Jokowi ===
On 21 April 2023, Ganjar was officially nominated by PDI-P as its presidential candidate. On 22 October, Gibran Rakabuming Raka–an active member of the party and the son of Jokowi–was officially nominated by the Advanced Indonesia Coalition as the vice-presidential candidate for Prabowo Subianto, after a controversial decision by the Constitutional Court allowed him to run. PDI-P initially supported the ruling and Puan Maharani opened a possibility to have Gibran to run as Ganjar's running mate but later regrets it after Prabowo nominated him as his running mate. In November, Gibran was expelled from the party. In the following months, some members and politicians from PDI-P began to attack Jokowi. During the party's anniversary celebration held on 10 January 2024, Megawati indirectly criticized "power hungry" leaders. Observers believe that her statement is directed towards Jokowi, who was not invited to the event. She asserted that PDI-P had triumphed in the two preceding elections due to the people's backing, rather than owing to Jokowi's influence.

Jokowi's alleged preference towards Prabowo Subianto over the party's nominee Ganjar Pranowo had caused splits to occur within the party. Members such as Budiman Sudjatmiko, Bobby Nasution, Immanuel Ebenezer and Maruarar Sirait had left the party due to their support to Prabowo Subianto. Gibran's vice candidacy to Prabowo also lead to realignment of voter demographics, especially in their own voting stronghold of Central Java, as both PDI-P and Gibran have the same voting base.

On 22 April 2024, in aftermath of Constitutional Court rejection over all claims and disputes related to the 2024 presidential election, PDI-P Central Board declared that both Jokowi and Gibran were no longer PDI-P member, thus confirming their separation from PDI-P. PDI-P on 7 May 2024 submitted a lawsuit against the General Elections Commission to the Jakarta Administrative Court in hopes to annul the election results and prevent Prabowo and Gibran to be sworn in as president and vice president by the People's Consultative Assembly (MPR). On 24 October 2024 prior to the inauguration, the Jakarta Administrative Court rejected PDI-P's lawsuit, upholding Gibran's candidacy and the election results while penalize PDI-P by paying legal fees.

On 28 May 2024, PDI-P held their 5th national meeting in Ancol, North Jakarta. The meeting declared that the 2024 general elections is by far the worst in Indonesia's democratic history due to massive practice of money politics, lack of ethics, abuse of power from the government and alleged violation of neutrality from election officials. PDI-P invites constitutional law experts, civil society, press, academics, intellectuals and all pro-democracy elements to carry out an objective evaluation of the implementation of the 2024 elections and demand all sides of the political spectrum to maintaining and realizing the ideals of the Reformasi, especially the institutionalization of democracy with popular sovereignty; eradicating corruption, collusion and nepotism (KKN); strengthening the press and civil society; supremacy of law; institutionalization of political parties; fair election organizers, and placing the TNI and POLRI to be more professional; and have an equal position in accordance with the spirit and history of its formation; its duties, functions and authorities are in accordance with the 1945 Constitution of the Republic of Indonesia. The meeting also recommended that Megawati Sukarnoputri to once again held chairpersonship from 2025 to 2030.

As the result of their conduct of not supporting the choice of the party in the 2024 presidential and local elections, PDI-P has formally fired 27 members from the party which include former President Joko Widodo and sitting Vice President Gibran Rakabuming Raka on 17 December 2024. Party secretary general Hasto Kristiyanto said the move is to solidify the party and to remind PDI-P's commitment to Indonesia's democracy. On 17 December, PDI-P formally fired Jokowi from his membership and accusing him for electoral interference, abuse of power and calling him the "source of moral decay". They also fired several members, including Gibran Rakabuming Raka, Bobby Nasution, Effendi Simbolon, and John Wempi Wetipo for picking a different side during the presidential and local elections.

During the Prabowo administration, PDI-P positioned itself as an opposition as they rejected Prabowo's offer to send ministers inside the Red and White Cabinet and emphasized ideological renewal through training their members. However, their stances are rather ambiguous as they are also supportive towards some government policy.

== Political identities ==
=== Ideology ===
The 2008 Political Parties Act states that political parties are allowed to include specific characteristics that reflect their political aspirations, as long as they do not contradict Pancasila and the 1945 Constitution. As per Article 5, Section 1 of its constitution and bylaws (AD/ART), PDI-P adheres to Pancasila. Megawati specifically clarified that the Pancasila referred to is the version of 1 June 1945. In September 2023, the party's Secretary-General, Hasto Kristiyanto, claimed that PDI-P is a progressive "leftist" party, not a communist nor socialist party. Outsider views on the party's political orientation vary. Academics and domestic observers classified PDI-P as a nationalist and secular party, while their international counterparts described it as a secular-nationalist, liberal-secularist, or populist party. In the party's stronghold of Central Java, PDI-P has been described as a catch-all party. Its political leaning has been described as centrist, centre-left, left-wing, and even centre-right.

=== Political positions ===
PDI-P believe the separation of religion and the state. It rejects regional regulations (perda) based on religion (such as Sharia-based perda), except for the Aceh region. PDI-P endorses gender equality and women's rights. It rejects a three-term extension for President Jokowi. The party also proclaims itself as the party of the "ordinary people".

According to its website, the party aims to realize the aims contained in the preamble to the 1945 Constitution in the form of a just and prosperous society and to bring about an Indonesia that is socially just as well as politically sovereign and economically self-sufficient, and that is Indonesian in character and culture. At the party's fourth congress in 2015, the PDIP issued a seven-point statement entitled "Realizing Great Indonesia: An Indonesia That Is Truly Independent," in which it committed to overseeing the central government's program. The statement emphasizes the Trisakti path as essential for political sovereignty, economic self-reliance, and cultural identity. It aims to revive national dignity, promote collaboration, and ensure social justice while solidifying its position as a political force and underlining its support for the poor in the fight against structural poverty.

The PDI-P parliamentary group in the DPR have expressed their opinions on a few issues:

Year	Bills	Votes	Party stances/Other views
2019	Revision of Law on the Corruption Eradication Commission; RUU KPK		
2022	Sexual Violence Crime Act; RUU TPKS		PDI-P urges comprehensive implementation of the bill, emphasizing not only legal enforcement but also addressing obstacles faced by victims. It stresses a focus on prevention and protection, integrating measures for evidence, knowledge, law enforcement, infrastructure, safe houses, rehabilitation, and community safety.
2022	Law on State Capital; RUU IKN		PDI-P asserts that the defense system in the future national capital should adhere to standards of strength, capabilities, and security to uphold the nation's integrity and maritime security.
2022	Revision of the Indonesian Criminal Code; RUU KUHP		PDI-P urges judges and law enforcement to exercise caution when applying Article 2 (paragraphs 1 and 2) and Articles 46 to 51. For adultery cases, PDI-P requests written consent from spouses, parents, or children before filing a criminal report under that article.
2023	Omnibus Law on Job Creation; RUU Cipta Kerja		PDI-P was among the parties that supported the bill.
2024	Special Region of Jakarta Act; RUU DKJ	Agree with reservations	Several PDI-P members objected to specific clauses, particularly regarding the appointment of Jakarta's governor and deputy governor by the president, as they perceived these to be similar to the centralist approach of the New Order era. PDI-P eventually endorsed the bill.

=== Electoral support ===
Vote share of PDI-P by region based on data availability at the 1999–2024 elections

The 2008 survey by Lingkaran Survei Indonesia (LSI Denny JA) highlights non-Muslims, secular Muslims, and low-income voters as the primary constituents of the PDI-P. It is notably popular among "not at all religious" Muslim voters, with 33% support in the 2009 legislative elections. In the 2009 presidential polls, 41% of non-religious Muslim voters favored Megawati, surpassing her overall 27% support. Regionally, the party boasts a predominantly strong support base in Central Java, often referred to as the PDI-P's "stronghold" or kandang banteng (lit. bull pen), Pangi Chaniago of Voxpol Research Center described the party's electorates in the region as "ideological voters". Additionally, the party thrives in Bali, West and Central Kalimantan, North Sulawesi, as well as Bangka Belitung—areas marked by substantial religious minorities or syncretistic forms of Islam, while facing challenges in certain areas of Sumatra, particularly in Islam-leaning Aceh and West Sumatra. It has also been popular among Chinese Indonesian voters.

== Leadership structure ==
The following is the composition of the PDI-P Central Board members for the 2019–2024 working period with 1-year extension until 2025, as inaugurated by Megawati on 5 July 2024:

Position	Name
Party Chair	Megawati Sukarnoputri
Secretaries-General
Secretary-General	Hasto Kristiyanto
Deputy Secretary General for Internal Affairs	Dolfie Otniel Frederic Palit
Deputy Secretary General for Governmental Affairs	Utut Adianto
Deputy Secretary General for Public Affairs	Sri Rahayu
Deputy Secretary General for Communications	Adian Yunus Yusak Napitupulu
Deputy Secretary General for Secretariat Affairs	Yoseph Aryo Adhi Dharmo
Treasurers
Treasurer	Olly Dondokambey
Deputy Treasurer for Internal Affairs	Rudianto Tjen
Deputy Treasurer for External Affairs	Yuke Yurike
Chairs of the Central Board
Internal Affairs
Party Honorary Council	Komarudin Watubun
Legislative Election Winning Division	Bambang Wuryanto
Executive Election Winning Division	Deddy Yevri Hanteru Sitorus
Ideology and Cadre Development Division	Djarot Saiful Hidayat
Membership and Organization Division	Andreas Hugo Pareira
Resource Division	Said Abdullah
Governmental Affairs
Political Division	Puan Maharani
Government and Regional Autonomy Division	Ganjar Pranowo
Public Policy and Beaurocratic Reform	Abdullah Azwar Anas
Foreign Affairs	Ahmad Basarah
National Legal System Reform Division	Yasonna Laoly
People's Advocacy Affairs
Economic Affairs	Basuki Tjahaja Purnama
Education Division	Puti Guntur Soekarno
Cultural Division	Rano Karno
Public Affairs
Disaster Management Division	Tri Rismaharini
Workers and Migrant Division	Mercy Chriesty Barends
Investment, Trade, Industry, and State Owned Enterprise Division	Darmadi Durianto
Health Division	Ribka Tjiptaning.
Social Security Division	Charles Honoris
Women and Children Division	I Gusti Ayu Bintang Darmawati
Cooperatives and SMEs Division	Andreas Eddy Susetyo
Tourism	Sarwo Budi Wiryanti Sukamdani
Youth and Sports Division	Esti Wijayati
Religious Affairs and Belief in God Almighty Division	Zuhairi Misrawi
Creative Economy and Digital Economy Division	Muhammad Prananda Prabowo
Food and Agriculture Division	Sadarestuwati
Marine and Fisheries Division	Rokhmin Dahuri
Environment and Forestry Division	Eriko Sotarduga
Law and Public Advocacy Division	Ronny Talapessy

== Leader ==
No.	Name	Image	Constituency / title	Term of office		Election results
No.	Name	Image	Constituency / title	Took office	Left office	Election results
Split from: Indonesian Democratic Party (Megawati's faction)
General Chairperson of the Indonesian Democratic Party of Struggle (1999–present)
1	Megawati Sukarnoputri (born 1947)		President of Indonesia (Note: 23 July 2001–20 October 2004)	15 February 1999	Incumbent	1999 Unopposed 2000 Unopposed 2005 Unopposed 2010 Unopposed 2015 Unopposed 2019 Unopposed 2025 Unopposed

== Wing organizations ==
PDI-P wing organizations include the following:

- Baitul Muslimin Indonesia (BAMUSI, Indonesian Muslim Abode)
- Banteng Muda Indonesia (BMI, Indonesian Young Bulls)
- Taruna Merah Putih (TMP, Red and White Cadets)
- Relawan Perjuangan Demokrasi (Repdem, Volunteers for Democratic Struggle)
- Komunitas Indonesia Tionghoa Perjuangan (KITA Perjuangan, Chinese Indonesian Community of Struggle)
- Gerakan Nelayan Tani Indonesia (GANTI, Indonesian Fishermen Farmers Movement)

== Election results ==
=== Legislative election results ===
Election	Ballot number	Leader	Seats		Total votes	Share of votes	Outcome of election
Election	Ballot number	Leader	No.	±	Total votes	Share of votes	Outcome of election
1999	11	Megawati Sukarnoputri	153 / 462		35,689,073	33.74%	Governing coalition
2004	18	Megawati Sukarnoputri	109 / 550	▼44	21,026,629	18.53%	Opposition
2009	28	Megawati Sukarnoputri	95 / 560	▼14	14,600,091	14.03%	Opposition
2014	4	Megawati Sukarnoputri	109 / 560	▲14	23,681,471	18.95%	Governing coalition
2019	3	Megawati Sukarnoputri	128 / 575	▲19	27,053,961	19.33%	Governing coalition
2024	3	Megawati Sukarnoputri	110 / 580	▼18	25,384,673	16.72%	Check and balance

=== Presidential election results ===
Election	Ballot number	Candidate	Running mate	1st round (Total votes)	Share of votes	Outcome	2nd round (Total votes)	Share of votes	Outcome
2004	2	**Megawati Sukarnoputri**	Hasyim Muzadi	31,569,104	26.61%	**Runoff**	44,990,704	39.38%	Lost
2009	1	**Megawati Sukarnoputri**	Prabowo Subianto	32,548,105	26.79%	Lost			
2014	2	**Joko Widodo**	Jusuf Kalla	70,997,833	53.15%	Elected			
2019	1	**Joko Widodo**	Ma'ruf Amin	85,607,362	55.50%	Elected			
2024	3	**Ganjar Pranowo**	Mahfud MD	27,040,878	16.47%	Lost			

Note: Bold text indicates the party member
