= Denny Januar Ali =

Indonesian journalist (born 1963)

Denny JA
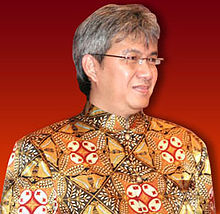
- Born: Denny Januar Ali; 4 January 1963 (age 63); Palembang, South Sumatra, Indonesia
- Education: LLB – University of Indonesia; MPA – University of Pittsburgh; PhD – Ohio State University
- Organization: Lingkaran Survei Indonesia

Denny Januar Ali, known as Denny JA (born 4 January 1963) is an Indonesian writer, political consultant, intellectual, litterateur, entrepreneur, and researcher. In 2021, the Essay Poetry Community nominated him as a nominee for the Nobel Prize in Literature. In Indonesia, Denny JA is listed as the second person ever to be nominated as a Nobel Literature nominee after Pramoedya Ananta Toer. He holds records in the academic, political, social media, literature and cultural worlds in Indonesia.

Denny JA was named by Time magazine in 2015 as one of 30 most influential people on the Internet. This recognition was regarding his role in utilizing social media in shaping public opinion and polls in Indonesia's 2014 presidential election.

In late July 2015, Denny JA's book Fang Yin's Handkerchief (English and German edition) become the no. 1 best-seller in Amazon.com kindle book poetry. Denny JA is also known for giving birth to a new genre of essay poetry through his book In the Name of Love. Around 150 poetry books have been published in Indonesia and Southeast Asia based on the new genre of essay poetry.

In 2014, he was awarded by Twitter, Inc. as The World No 2 Golden Tweet 2014, and the No 1 in Indonesia. He was also awarded by MURI as the first and the only political consultant in the world helping and winning presidential election three times in a row. In his case, the presidential elections he was involved were in Indonesia in 2004, 2009, and 2014. In the same year, he was chosen as one of 33 the most influential literature figures in Indonesian history by a team of eight (a team of prominent poets, critics and academicians).

On 16 August 2018, he and his institution Lingkaran Survei Indonesia held the largest political education and were awarded the Guinness World Records. As for the award in literary works, he received the 2020 ASEAN Humanitarian and Diplomacy Literature Award from the Sabah Language and Literature Agency, Malaysia and the 2021 Lifetime Achievement Award from the Indonesian Writers Guild Satupena for his dedication and innovation in the world of writing for 40 years. He is also widely reported as a pioneer of NFT in Indonesia. His painting entitled: A Portrait of Denny JA: 40 Years in The World of Ideas is Indonesia's first NFT ever sold at the public gallery, Opensea, in April 2021, for 27.5 ETH, worth one billion Indonesian rupiahs at the time.

Denny JA is also known as a social activist promoting and campaigning non-discrimination movement and funding this movement by his own money after he is successful as a businessman.

== Background ==
In the academic world, Denny JA founded the Indonesian Survey Foundation (LSI, Lembaga Survei Indonesia 2003), the Indonesian Survey Circle (LSI, Lingkaran Survei Indonesia 2005), the Public Association of Opinion Research (AROPI, 2007), and the Indonesian Political Consultancy Association (AKPI, 2009). Through these four organizations Denny JA has become known as the founding father of a new tradition in Indonesian public opinion surveying and political consultancy.

Denny JA popularized the quantitative social science that has been able to predict the winners of local and general elections in Indonesia since 2004. He predicted the winner of the 2009 presidential election one month before it took place. The incumbent President Susilo Bambang Yudhoyono, predicted Denny JA, will win in just one round. He went massively public with his prediction in the newspapers and on national TV. His prediction was the hottest topic of conversation during the 2009 presidential elections and even became the subject of an official debate between the presidential candidates which was aired by many national TV stations. His prediction was accurate, and Denny JA was awarded the title of News Maker of the 2009 Election by the Indonesian Association of Journalists. In the political world (2004–2012), Denny JA has been dubbed a king maker thanks to his instrumental role in the victories of two presidents (2004, 2009), 23 governors out of the 33 Indonesian provinces, and 51 regents and mayors. Through his entrepreneurship he has turn political consultancy into a new profession, and an effective one.

Denny JA also scored a hit when he overturned articles contained in both the 2009 Law on Legislative Elections and the 2009 Law on Presidential Elections. Twice the Constitutional Court ruled in favour of Denny JA in his position as chairman of the association of survey institutions (AROPI). Articles which restricted academic freedom, such as those banning the quick count on the day of the election were overturned by the Constitutional Court.

He also holds the MURI record for being the first person to bring Indonesian literature into the social media era. His book of poetry, Atas Nama Cinta (2012) was the first which could be accessed on smartphones through Twitter. In less than one month, puisi-esai.com gained over one million hits. In less than six months, the website received over four million hits. This has never been achieved before by any book, especially a book of literature. Especially a book of poetry.

Since 2012 Denny JA has been active in the anti-discrimination movement. He founded the Denny JA Foundation for an Indonesia Without Discrimination, which publishes a variety of cultural works including poetry, dramas, songs, photographs, paintings and films, which spread modern concepts of equality and legal protection for citizens, whatever their social identity.

== Career ==
Denny JA began his career as an executive director of Jayabaya University in Jakarta from 2000 to 2003 and functioned as a columnist for nine national newspapers between 1986 and 2005. He also hosted political programs on Metro TV and Radio Delta FM from 2002 to 2004. He also entered the fields of surveying and political consultancy, and since 2005 has been an executive director of Lingkaran Survei Indonesia (LSI), the first research and political consultancy institution on a national scale in Indonesia.

In July 2025, he was appointed president and Independent Commissioner of Pertamina Hulu Energi (PHE), a key upstream oil and gas subsidiary of Indonesia's state-owned energy company Pertamina.

In 2012 Denny JA made a splash in the worlds of academia, politics, business, literary culture, social media and charity, often pioneering new traditions in these fields.

== Civil Society ==
1. Denny JA Foundation in the Indonesia Without Discrimination Movement.
2. Chairman of the Indonesian Writers Guild Satupena 2021–2026.
3. Founder and Chairman of the Association of Indonesian Political Consultants 2009–present.
4. Founder and Chairman of the Public Opinion Research Association (AROPI) in 2008–2018.

== Personal life ==
Denny JA is married and has two sons.

== Books and other works ==
- Complete list of Denny JA's works: talks, movies, books, poems, theater, etc.: Klik disini
- Atas Nama Cinta (In The Name of Love), A Poetic Essay, A New Literary Genre (Rene Book, 2012)
- Democratization From Below, Protesting Events and Regime Change in Indonesia 1997–1998, Ph.D thesis from Ohio State University, published in the United States: Pustaka Sinar Harapan, 2006
- Maneuvers of the Elite, Conflict and Conservative Political Opinion: Tempo Magazine, LKiS, 2006
- Strengthening the Fifth Pillar (LSI Survey Findings on the 2004 Election), LKis 2006
- Politicians and the Song: A Collection of Columns: Rakyat Merdeka, Sindo, LKis 2006
- Political Notes (Denny JA, LKis), 2006
- The Fall of Soeharto and the Indonesian Democratic Transition (Denny JA, LKis), 2006
- Various Topics in Comparative Politics (Denny JA, LKis), 2006
- Membangun Demokrasi Sehari-hari Opini: Media Indonesia, LKis, 2006
- Partai Politik pun Berguguran Opini: Republika, LKiS, 2006
- Visi Indonesia Baru Setelah Reformasi 1998 (A New Vision of Indonesia After the 1998 Reforms) (Denny JA, LKis), 2006
- Membaca Isu Politik (Reading about Political Issues) (Denny JA, LKiS), 2006
- Politik Yang Mencari Bentuk Kolom (Politics in Search of a Column): Majalah Gatra, [LkiS], 2006
- Jejak-Jejak Pemilu 2004 (The 2004 Election Trail) Talk Show – Denny JA dalam Dialog Aktual: Radio Delta FM, [LKiS] 2006
- Napak Tilas Reformasi Politik Indonesia (Flashback to Indonesian Political Reform) Talk Show – Denny JA on Dialog Aktual Radio: Delta FM, [LKiS], 2006
- Parliament Watch Eksperiment Demokrasi (Experiment with Democracy): Dilema Indonesia Talk Show: Metro TV, Pustaka Sinar Harapan, 2006
- Melewati Perubahan, Sebuah Catatan Atas Transisi Demokrasi Indonesia Kumpulan Tulisan (Passing Change: A Collection of Notes and Writing on Indonesia’s Transition to Democracy), Jawa Pos, Indopos, LKiS, 2006
- Jalan Panjang Reformasi Opini (The Long Road to Opinion Reform): Harian Suara Pembaharuan, Pustaka Sinar Harapan, 2006
- Demokrasi Indonesia: Visi dan Praktek Opini (Indonesian Democracy: The Vision and Practice of Opinion): Harian Kompas, Pustaka Sinar Harapan, 2006
- Election Watch, Meretas Jalan Demokrasi Talk Show: Metro TV, Pustaka Sinar Harapan, 2006
- The Role of Government in Economy and Business (Denny JA, LKiS), 2006
- Gerakan Mahasiswa dan Politik Kaum Muda Era 80-an (the Student Movement and Youth Politics in the 80s) (Denny JA, LKiS), 2006

== Awards ==
- 2021 Lifetime Achievement Award from the Indonesian Writers Guild Satupena for his dedication and innovation in the world of writing for 40 years.
- 2020 ASEAN Humanitarian and Diplomacy Literature Award from the Sabah Language and Literature Agency, Malaysia.
- Guinness World Records 2018 for the Largest Political Lesson.
- Awarded by Time magazine as one of the 30 most influential people on the Internet, 2015.
- Award for achievement and pioneering social science research Indonesia from the Indonesian Christian University (UKI), 2011
- Newsmaker of The Election Award 2009 from Persatuan Wartawan Indonesia: PWI Jaya, 2009
- Civil Society Award 2009 from Forum Keadilan magazine: Forum Keadilan, 2009
- Life Achievement Award 2008 from Biographi Politik magazine, 2008
- Award from Masyarakat Ilmu Pemerintahaan Indonesia: MIPI, 2007
- PKS Award from Partai Keadilan Sejahtera for his contribution to new traditions in national politics through public opinion polling: PKS, 2007
- MO Award from Men's Obsession magazine for his contribution to new traditions in national politics through public opinion polling, 2006
- Political Entrepreneur Award from Rakyat Merdeka for his contribution to new traditions in national politics for research in provincial election districts, which resulted in surveys and political consultancy becoming a central element of provincial and district elections (Pilkada) from Aceh to Papua, 2006
- Indonesian Records (MURI) in the fields of academia, public opinion, political consultancy, social media and literature
