= State Capital Act 2023 =

2022 Indonesian law

UU Ibu Kota Negara (UU IKN)

People's Representative Council
- Long title: Undang-undang Nomor 21 Tahun 2023 tentang Perubahan atas Undang-undang Nomor 3 Tahun 2022 tentang Ibu Kota Negara (Law No. 21/2023 on Amendment of Law No. 3/2022 on State Capital)
- Citation: Law No. 21/2023
- Territorial extent: Nusantara
- Passed by: People's Representative Council
- Passed: 3 October 2023
- Commenced: 31 October 2023

Legislative history
- Bill title: RUU Perubahan atas Undang-undang (UU) Nomor 3 Tahun 2022 tentang Ibu Kota Negara (Bill on Amendment to Law No. 3/2022 Re: State Capital)
- Introduced: 21 August 2023

Amends
- Law on State Capital
- Status: In force

The 2023 State Capital Act (Indonesian: Undang-Undang Ibu Kota Negara/UU IKN 2023) is an act of parliament in form of omnibus law to amend the previous Law on State Capital, a piece of law to relocate capital of Indonesia from Jakarta to Nusantara in East Kalimantan as the new capital of Indonesia. Introduced on 21 August 2023, the omnibus bill was passed into law on 3 October 2023. The law intended to amend and expand the power given to the Nusantara Capital City Authority (OIKN).

The bill was approved with almost all fractions in People's Representative Council (DPR). In unusual move, Democratic Party one of two opposing parties opposing Joko Widodo administration also supporting the law. Only Prosperous Justice Party rejected the law passage.

== Changes and Amendments ==
There are 9 changes to the Law on State Capital introduced by the bill:

- Specialized Authorities
- Agrarian Affairs Autonomy
- Financial Management
- Position Filling
- Update on Areal Delineation, resulted in changes on Nusantara's area
- Housing Affairs Autonomy
- Spatial Management
- Relationship and Partnership between OIKN and DPR
- Assurance for Sustainable Development.

== Notable Changes ==
Some notable changes are:

=== Expansion of the Nusantara Capital City Authority' powers ===
The new bill expanded the power of the Authority to include investment licensing, easing businesses, providing special facilities to funders of Nusantara facilitators, its developers and its satellite areas.

=== Agrarian affairs autonomy ===
The new bill granted special agrarian affairs to the Authority to manage land use and spatial management within Nusantara.

=== Position filling autonomy ===
The new bill granted autonomy to the Authority to fill the Deputies and/or other high positions within the Authority with non-state apparatus experts. Thus, making the Authority having "mini cabinet"-like structure similar to the Presidential Cabinet.

=== Financing autonomy ===
The Authority granted power to issue bonds and securities to provide funding for Nusantara development. It also granted power to the Authority to make foreign loans with permission of the Ministry of Finance.

=== Extremely long cultivation rights and building use rights to the Investors ===
The law granted 190-years cultivation rights to anyone who invest in Nusantara. The 190-years cultivation rights not given at once but given by 2 cycles with each cycle has 95 years long. The law also granted 160-years building use rights to anyone who invest in Nusantara, given by 2 cycles with each cycle has 80 years long.

=== Status of Nusantara Capital City Authority assets ===
The Authority assets' status is much like treated in manner similar as state-owned enterprises rather than state-owned government institutions. As result, it may purchasable, exchanged, granted, or being included in equity capital for funding Nusantara development.

=== People Representation within Nusantara ===
By the law, future Nusantara people representation is solely exercised by members of Commission II of the DPR. There will be no representatives for Nusantara region in local or regional level.

== "Sweeper" Article 42 ==
Article 42 of the law noted as "omni-sweeper article", because its sweeping power in cancelling of any effects of regulations and laws that may limit or obstruct the capital relocation. Many legal experts condemned the article because its perceived unconstitutionality and accused the Joko Widodo administration as pro-Investor.

== Criticism, Challenges, and Judicial Reviews ==
Only Prosperous Justice Party condemned the passage of the law in parliament. Indonesian Legal Aid Foundation condemned the passage of the law, especially because the sweeper Article 42, condemning the passage as unconstitutional.

On 29 November 2024, Dayak tribe member Stepanus Febyan Babaro challenges Article 16A paragraphs (1), (2), and (3) of the Act on the right over land, which comprises the right to cultivate, the right to build, and the right to use, to the Constitutional Court of Indonesia. The preliminary hearing for case No. 185/PUU-XXII/2024 took place on Tuesday, March 4, 2025. The second hearing was held on 17 March 2025 with revisions had been made to the petition, one of them being the addition of one petitioner, Ronggo Warsito. The Petitioners requested that the constitutional justices grant the petition in its entirety; and that Article 16A paragraphs (1), (2), and (3) of the Act be declared unconstitutional or be interpreted to mean that the maximum duration of the right to cultivate and the right to use be limited to 25 years while the right to build be limited to 20 years. On 19 May 2025, the third hearing was held, and Head of the Legal and Compliance Unit of the Nusantara Capital Authority, Agung Dodit Muliawan argued that provisions on right over land (HAT) under the Act is an effort to attract more investors to invest in the Nusantara Capital City. The fourth hearing had been held on 4 June 2025 and the fifth hearing had been held on 25 June 2025, but there is still no decision from the Court and still no announcement when the next hearing will be held as of October 2025.

On 10 October 2025, Astro Li challenged Explanation of the Act to the Constitutional Court as part of Petition Number 187/PUU-XXIII/2025. He requested the court to interpret Capital Specific Region of Jakarta (Daerah Khusus Ibukota Jakarta) as Specific Region of Jakarta (Daerah Khusus Jakarta) following enactment of Jakarta Specific Region Province Act and interpret establishment of Nusantara Capital Specific Region Province as essential since the beginning of capital relocation process instead of declaring it as later part of the process. The first hearing was held on 21 October 2025, and Astro Li had submitted revision of the petition to strengthen his legal standing and arguments on 24 October 2025. The second hearing was held on 3 November 2025 to confirm revision and evidences, then the constitutional justices will discuss whether the petition will directly go to decision announcement hearing or the petition still requires additional hearings to gather testimonies from People's Representative Council, President, experts, witnesses, and other relevant parties.
