= Special Region of Jakarta Act =

2024 Indonesian law

UU Provinsi Daerah Khusus Jakarta

People's Representative Council
- Long title: Undang-undang Nomor 2 Tahun 2024 tentang Provinsi Daerah Khusus Jakarta (Law No. 2/2024 on Special Regional Province of Jakarta)
- Citation: Law No. 2/2024
- Territorial extent: Jakarta, with extension of Bogor Regency, Tangerang Regency, Bekasi Regency, Cianjur Regency, Bogor, Tangerang City, South Tangerang, and Bekasi City
- Passed by: People's Representative Council
- Passed: 28 March 2024
- Commenced: 25 April 2024

Legislative history
- Bill title: RUU Daerah Khusus Jakarta (Bill on Special Region of Jakarta)
- Introduced: 5 December 2023

Repeals
- Law No. 29/2007 (Special Capital Region of Jakarta Act)

Amended by
- Law No. 151/2024 (Re: Amendment of Law 2/2024)

Related legislation
- State Capital Act 2023; Law on State Capital
- Status: In force

The Special Regional Province of Jakarta Act (Indonesian: Undang-Undang Provinsi Daerah Khusus Jakarta) is an act of parliament that declares that Jakarta is no longer the capital of Indonesia. Initially, it was expected that Nusantara would officially become Indonesia's new capital beginning on 25 April 2024, but it has since been halted, with Jakarta still being the capital as of October 2024. It is expected when Nusantara becomes the capital city, Jakarta's status as a "Special Capital Region" will be revoked. The law will turn Jakarta into a "Special Region" for economic and trading purposes.

Of the nine political parties in the House of Representatives that passed the bill, only the Prosperous Justice Party rejected the passage of the law.

== History ==
After the passage of the State Capital Act 2023, the Indonesian government and People's Representative Council discussed Jakarta's future for when the capital is moved to Nusantara. On 5 December 2023, the People's Representative Council submitted the "Bill on Special Region of Jakarta". The main contents of the bill were:

1. Areal delimitation of Jakarta.
2. The governor and Deputy Governor will no longer be elected by presidential appointment.
3. Special rights of Jakarta in regulating its economy.
4. There will be regencies and cities in Jakarta in the future, but the regent and mayor posts will be held by a gubernatorial appointment.
5. As a consequence of the formation of new regencies and cities, there will be regency-level and town-level representative councils.
6. Special taxes in the Special Region of Jakarta.

Regarding the governor and deputy governor being presidentially appointed posts, the PDI-P, Golkar, National Awakening Party, Nasdem, Prosperous Justice Party, Democratic Party, and National Mandate Party objected to the change. The government, through the Ministry of Home Affairs, also voiced their rejection as the change being undemocratic.

When the law finally passed on 28 April 2024, much of its content was revised from the original bill. The main contents are:

1. Formation of Agglomerated Regions Council.
2. Governor and Deputy Governor are still democratically elected posts.
3. Allocation of special funds for social and community affairs for districts.
4. Limited autonomy for future Jakarta local government.
5. Cultural development in Jakarta.
6. Special taxation and tariffs that established within Jakarta.
7. Agrarian affairs in Jakarta.

== Agglomerated Regions Council ==
Article 55 of the law mandated the formation of the Agglomerated Regions Council (Indonesian: Dewan Kawasan Aglomerasi). The council will regulate the development of Agglomerated Regions of Jakarta, which would consist of Jakarta and its satellites: Bogor Regency, Tangerang Regency, Bekasi Regency, Cianjur Regency, Bogor, Tangerang City, South Tangerang, and Bekasi. The formation of this council was required because prior to the formation of the council, Jakarta's environmental and transportation problems were divided into Jakarta, Bogor, and Bekasi's local governments. Moreover, different ruling political factions and views between the three local governments caused difficulties in enacting the changes. In the original bill, it was mentioned that the Agglomerated Regions Council would be chaired by the Vice President of Indonesia ex officio. However, in the law form, the office will be filled by a president-appointed official.

== Transitional period ==
Due to the law, Jakarta no longer served as the de jure Indonesian capital. Article 73 of the law stated that the capital remained in Jakarta de facto until Nusantara was properly established for administrative purposes. On 30 November 2024, President Prabowo Subianto signed Law No. 151/2024, officially revoking Jakarta's status as the capital and setting Nusantara as the Capital of Indonesia. The permanent establishment of Nusantara as the new capital of Indonesia is expected to happen by a Presidential Decree no longer after 17 August 2028.

== Criticisms, Challenges, and Judicial Reviews ==
=== 2024 ===
A member of the Democratic Party and chairman of the Central Jakarta Executive Board (DPC), Taufiqurrahman, who would like to run for Central Jakarta mayor challenged Article 1 number (9), Article paragraph (1), Article 13 paragraph (2), paragraph (3), and paragraph (4) letter a of the Act to the Constitutional Court of Indonesia on 6 June 2024. He hopes that the mayors or regents leading the cities/regencies in Jakarta will no longer be appointed and dismissed by the governor but rather elected by the people. The Petitioner wishes that political parties could nominate mayors, deputy mayors, regents, and deputy regents for the Specific Region Province of Jakarta. Thus, like other regions, the regional heads in each area of the Specific Region Province of Jakarta would be directly elected by the people, not by the governor.

In his petitum, the Petitioner requests the Court to declare Article 1 Paragraph (9), Article 6 Paragraph (1), and Article 13 Paragraphs (1), (2), and (4) letter a of the Act to be in conflict with Article 1 Paragraph (2), Article 18 Paragraph (4), and Articles 28D Paragraphs (1) and (3) of the Constitution of Indonesia. The Petitioner also asks the Court to order the People's Representative Council (DPR) and the government to enact a law on autonomous cities/regencies in the Specific Region Province of Jakarta. The Constitutional Court decided that it could not accept the petition No. 75/PUU-XXII/2024 in a hearing held on September 12, 2024. According to the Court, the formulation of the petitum submitted by the Petitioner in the revision of the petition is unclear or obscure despite the reason for the conflict between the norms petitioned for review and the 1945 Constitution have been explained. However, the Petitioner does not clearly mention the subject matter of the petition for constitutional review.

=== 2025 ===
On 10 October 2025, Astro Li challenged Article 63, Article 65, and Article 73 of the Act as well as Article II of the Revision to the Act (Law Number 151 of 2024) to the Constitutional Court of Indonesia as part of Petition Number 187/PUU-XXIII/2025. These Acts require a presidential decree to formally initiate the transfer of the national capital from the Capital Specific Region of Jakarta to Nusantara as well as the implementation of the Act. According to Astro Li, this requirement delays the provincial level specific region governments intended for both Jakarta and Nusantara and hinders the execution of the Act—measures deemed beneficial for Indonesia generally and also for Jakarta agglomeration area specifically.

Astro Li further noted that Article 66 of the Act already provides that government agencies or organizations unable to relocate may remain temporarily in Jakarta. Therefore, he argued, the transition to Nusantara as the capital could proceed at once without awaiting a presidential decree. Jakarta, he said, could temporarily retain its capital functions alongside Nusantara until the transition period formally concludes—at which point a decree would be needed only to terminate Jakarta’s capital status. Immediate relocation of some institutions and establishment of new Jakarta specific region will reduce environmental burden of Jakarta metropolitan area faster.

The first hearing was held on 21 October 2025, and Astro Li had submitted revision of the petition to strengthen his legal standing and arguments on 24 October 2025. The second hearing was held on 3 November 2025 to confirm revision and evidences, then the constitutional justices will discuss whether the petition will directly go to decision announcement hearing or the petition still requires additional hearings to gather testimonies from People's Representative Council, President, experts, witnesses, and other relevant parties.
