= Essay Poetry =

Form of literature

Essay Poetry (Indonesian: Puisi Esai) combines two types of thinking, namely poetry and essays. The principle of essay poetry was first proposed and initiated by Denny Januar Ali and creatively manifested in 2012 through a book entitled "In the Name of Love." In total, around 100 books essay poetry have been published by Indonesian and foreign poets. Then in 2020, essay poetry officially became a new word in the Official Indonesian Dictionary. A written work can be called essay poetry if it meets four criteria. Firstly, it must touch the reader's heart by exploring the inner, personal experience as well as express the inner psychological aspects of man in a concrete manner. Secondly, it must portray mankind in a social context or in an authentic historical event. It should not evade the existence of relevant research that comprehends the social reality attached to an event. It should also not avoid using footnotes, since their use is a central aspect of this medium. Thirdly, it must be written in language that is simple enough to be read by the general public, yet still be elegantly arranged. Fourthly, it must depict a certain social dynamic or describe a dynamic that involves the character of a perpetrator. The composition of an essay poem should not elude or preclude the possibility that it becomes lengthy and divided into many short chapters.

== Background ==
In 2006, the chairman of the Poetry Foundation, John Barr, wrote a book entitled "American Poetry in the New Century." In the book, John Barr wrote a critique of the development of poetry in the United States. This criticism is also directed at the contemporary world of poetry in Indonesia. John Barr argues that poetry has not understood significant changes over the centuries and is becoming increasingly difficult for the public to understand. In response to this, in 2011, Denny Januar Ali conducted limited research on the development of poetry in Indonesia. This research was carried out entirely by the Indonesian Survey Institute (Lingkaran Survei Indonesia), which he founded. This research shows that most Indonesians, even those with higher education, find it very difficult to understand the meaning of contemporary poetry. On the other hand, the purpose of old poems made by Chairil Anwar and W.S. Rendra can be understood easily, even though they have various meanings.

Before John Barr put forward his opinion, Joseph Epstein had already stated that the works of contemporary poets could only be understood by their esoteric circles and were not known by students because of the lack of language adaptation. He expressed the concern in his essay entitled "Who Killed Poetry?". Likewise, Delmore Schwartz stated the same thing in his essay entitled "The Isolation of Modern Poetry." Schwartz reveals that modern poetry lacks interest because of the complexity of the language used in contemporary poetry.

Responding to this, Denny Januar Ali began to think of a new medium that could provide an understanding of social issues and touch the hearts of the readers. Then, Denny found a new medium called " essay poetry. " This medium is a fusion of poetry and essays. Along with discovering essay poetry, Denny also published a book entitled "In the Name of Love" in March 2012. Before setting the name of the medium "essay poetry," Denny Januar Ali has changed his name several times, starting from lyrical opinion, lyrical essays, opinion poetry, and narrative poetry. The choice of the name for the essay poem is the final result of a discussion conducted by Denny Januar Ali and his colleagues, namely Sapardi Djoko Damono, Ignas Kleden, Eriyanto, Fatin Hamama, and Mohamad Sobary.

== The Initiator ==
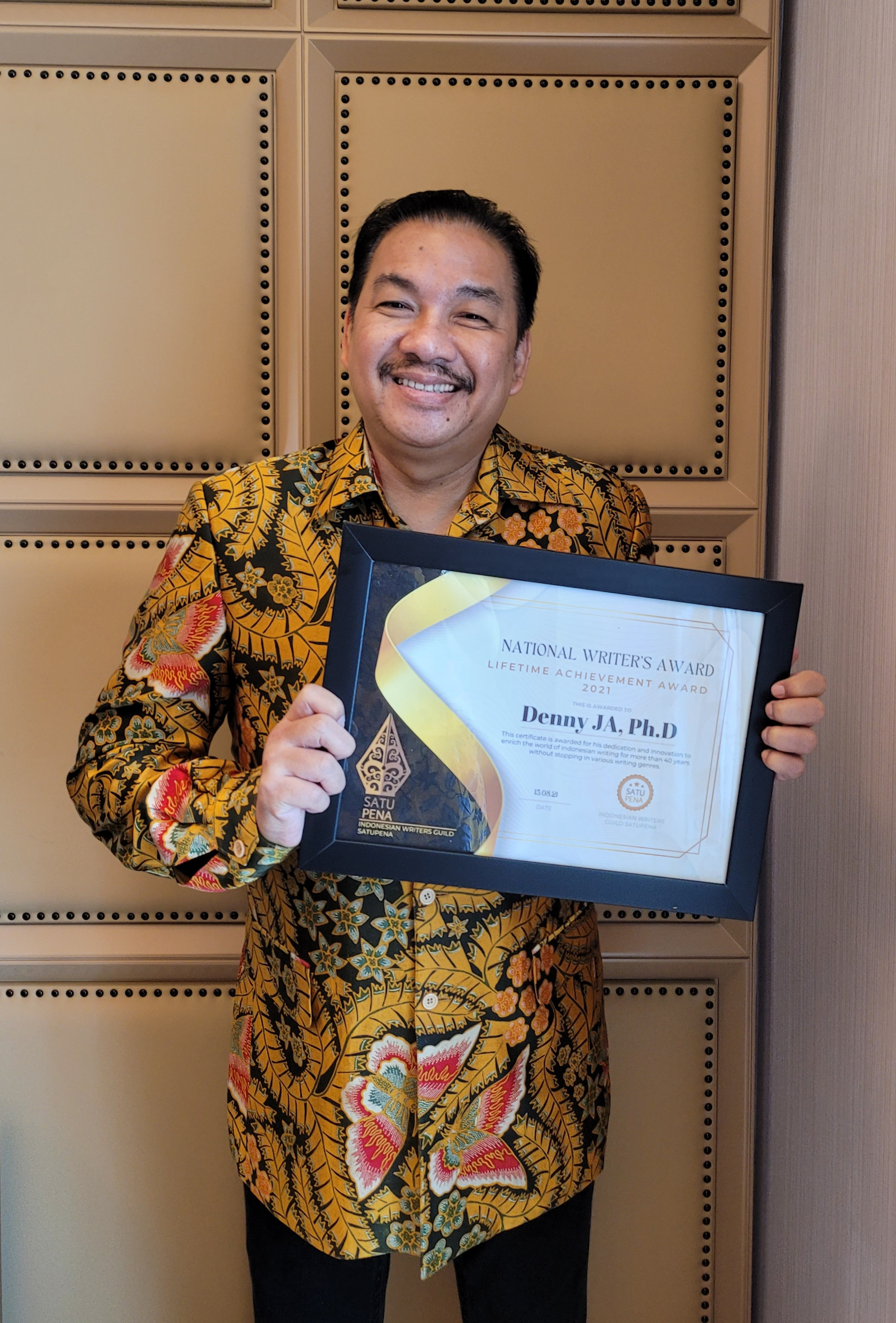
Denny JA receives the Lifetime Achievement Award from Indonesian Writers Guild Satupena for his 40 years of dedication to fighting discrimination issues through writing.

Denny Januar Ali, known as Denny JA (born 4 January 1963 in Palembang, South Sumatra) is a writer, political consultant, intellectual, litterateur, entrepreneur, and researcher. In 2021, the Essay Poetry Community nominated him as a nominee for the Nobel Prize in Literature. In Indonesia, Denny JA is listed as the second person ever to be nominated as a Nobel Literature nominee after Pramoedya Ananta Toer. He holds records in the academic, political, social media, literature and cultural worlds in Indonesia.

On August 16, 2018, he and his institution Lingkaran Survei Indonesia held the largest political education and were awarded the Guinness World Records. As for the award in literary works, he received the 2021 ASEAN Humanitarian and Diplomacy Literature Award from the Sabah Language and Literature Agency, Malaysia and the 2021 Lifetime Achievement Award from the Indonesian Writers Guild Satupena for his dedication and innovation in the world of writing for 40 years.

== Essay Poetry Community ==
The essay poetry community has now spread to ASEAN countries. Various activities are organized by this community, ranging from writing stories about public relations in ASEAN to monthly webinars. Datuk Jasni Matlani and Fatin Hamama lead the ASEAN essay poetry community. Meanwhile, Monica Anggi JR and Irsyad Mohammad coordinated the Indonesian Essay Poetry Network.
