= State Capital Act 2022 =

2022 Indonesian law

UU Ibu Kota Negara (UU IKN)

People's Representative Council
- Long title: Undang-Undang Nomor 3 Tahun 2022 tentang Ibu Kota Negara (Law No. 3/2022 about State Capital)
- Citation: Law No. 3/2022
- Territorial extent: Indonesia, focusing on Penajam North Paser Regency and Kutai Kartanegara Regency
- Passed by: People's Representative Council
- Passed: 18 January 2022
- Commenced: 15 February 2022

Legislative history
- Bill title: RUU Ibu Kota Negara (Bill on State Capital)
- Introduced by: Joko Widodo
- Introduced: 29 September 2021

Amends
- 4 acts.

Amended by
- 2023 Law on State Capital
- Status: In force (amended)

Law on State Capital (Indonesian: Undang-Undang Ibu Kota Negara/UU IKN) is an omnibus law to relocate capital of Indonesia from Jakarta to Nusantara at East Kalimantan as new capital of Indonesia. The omnibus bill of the law was passed into law on 18 January 2022, and finally commenced on 15 February 2022.

Unusual in the law-making history of Indonesia, the law become the fastest law made in Indonesia after being law only 111 days after the bill was introduced, with only 42 days processed at People's Representative Council and only 16 hours marathon discussion between the People's Representative Council and the Indonesian government before being passed.

== History ==
Interest on capital relocation by Joko Widodo administration had been revived since 2017. On 23 August 2019, Jokowi submitted Presidential Letter No. R-34/Pres/08/2019. The Letter enclosed with 2 enclosures: (1) Presidential Study Report on Capital Relocation, and (2) Request on DPR Support for Capital Relocation. On 26 August 2019, Jokowi announced that the new capital would be partly in the Penajam North Paser Regency and partly in the Kutai Kartanegara Regency, both in East Kalimantan. The National Development Planning Ministry announced that the move would cost an estimated Rp 466 trillion (US$32.7 billion) and that the government intended to cover 19% of the cost, the remainder coming mainly from public-private partnerships and direct investment by both state-owned enterprises and the private sector.

Final Draft of the Law on State Capital, as obtained by Indonesian media 19 January 2022

Circa January 2020, a draft of the bill leaked to public. The draft, dated 14 January 2020, consisted of 10 chapters and 39 sections. The draft of the bill showed that 6 laws will be amended by time of the law enacted.

On 29 September 2021, Joko Widodo sent Presidential Letter No. R-44/Pres/09/2021 contained 2 enclosures: Bill on State Capital and Academic Draft on State Capital Relocation drafted by Ministry of National Development Planning. In the official draft of the bill, the bill consisted of 9 chapters and 34 sections. The provisional chapter of the bill showed that 3 acts (Law No. 25/1956, Law No. 47/1999, and Law No. 7/2002) will be amended and 1 act (Law No. 29/2007) will be repealed after the enactment of the law if certain conditions met.

On 18 January 2022, the bill passed into law. The law was passed unusually fast.

On 19 January 2022, the final draft of the law somehow obtained by media and released to the public. The final draft of the law consisted of 11 chapters and 44 sections.

The law commenced on 15 February 2022.

== Criticisms, Challenges, and Judicial Reviews ==
=== 2022 ===
The law currently challenged by Indonesian right-wing activists, politicians, former military commanders/generals, and also Islamic activists and Islamic hard line mass organizations. The challengers, claimed from the Poros Nasional Kedaulatan Negara (PNKN, English: National Axis of State Sovereignty), claimed that the law is unneeded and requested the Constitutional Court to cancel the law. One of the PNKN member, Abdullah Hehamahua, former Corruption Eradication Commission advisor-turned-Islamist activist launched racial accusation with anti-Chinese tendency against the government, claiming that the project is an attempt to turn Jakarta as "Second Beijing". On 1 June 2022, the submitted cases: 39/PUU-XX/2022, 40/PUU-XX/2022, 47/PUU-XX/2022, 48/PUU-XX/2022, 53/PUU-XX/2022, and 54/PUU-XX/2022 were dismissed by the Constitutional Court. On 20 July 2022, another submitted cases: 25/PUU-XX/2022, 34/PUU-XX/2022, 49/PUU-XX/2022, and 66/PUU-XX/2022 also dismissed by the Constitutional Court. One case, Case No. 66/PUU-XX/2022, was a case rejected by the court after the submitter found to producing false signatures in submitted document, resulted the submitter unable to submit the case again.

=== 2025 ===
On 10 October 2025, Astro Li challenged Article 4 paragraph (2), Article 27, Article 39, Article 40 paragraph (1) letter b, Article 41 paragraph (3), and Explanation of the Act to the Constitutional Court of Indonesia as part of Petition Number 187/PUU-XXIII/2025. The Act requires a presidential decree to formally initiate the transfer of the national capital from the Capital Specific Region of Jakarta to Nusantara and to commence the administration of the Nusantara Capital Specific Region provincial-level government, as well as the implementation of the Jakarta Specific Region Province Act. According to Astro Li, this requirement delays the provincial level specific region governments intended for both Jakarta and Nusantara and hinders the execution of the Act as well as new Jakarta Act—measures deemed beneficial not only for Indonesia generally but also for their respective special agglomeration area.

Astro Li contended that to enable the gradual relocation of national institutions, Nusantara should have automatically assumed the status, functions, and role of the national capital upon enactment of the Act, without the need for a presidential decree. The same applies to the Nusantara Capital Specific Region Province Government, which should begin operating immediately, given that the Nusantara Capital Authority is already empowered by Article 5 paragraph (6) of the Act to issue regulations for governing the new capital. Astro Li further noted that Article 66 of the new Jakarta Act already provides that government agencies or organizations unable to relocate may remain temporarily in Jakarta. Therefore, he argued, the transition to Nusantara as the capital could proceed at once without awaiting a presidential decree. Jakarta, he said, could temporarily retain its capital functions alongside Nusantara until the transition period formally concludes—at which point a decree would be needed only to terminate Jakarta’s capital status.

The first hearing was held on 21 October 2025, and Astro Li had submitted revision of the petition to strengthen his legal standing and arguments on 24 October 2025. The second hearing was held on 3 November 2025 to confirm revision and evidences, then the constitutional justices will discuss whether the petition will directly go to decision announcement hearing or the petition still requires additional hearings to gather testimonies from People's Representative Council, President, experts, witnesses, and other relevant parties.
