= Lingkaran Survei Indonesia =

Survey company in Indonesia

Lingkaran Survei Indonesia (LSI) is an Indonesian survey and political consultancy institution. It was founded in 2005 by a group of public opinion makers, researchers, columnists, and survey experts. LSI is active in committing political surveys, for example during the General Election (Pemilu) or District Head General Election (Pilkada). In 2011, Universitas Kristen Indonesia (UKI) awarded LSI an “Achievement Award” since it was judged that LSI has provided significant contributions to the field of social science, political communication, and election politics in Indonesia.

Lingkaran Survei Indonesia is often made a study subject and even the place where foreign politicians conduct their comparative studies. At the end of 2010 a delegation of US Congress led by Zack Hudgins conducted a meeting with Lingkaran Survei Indonesia. That meeting was a part of their chain of political activities in Indonesia aside from visiting various other institutions such as the People's Representative Council (DPR), political parties, and other elite entities of Indonesian politics. The reasoning behind that meeting was stated as due to Lingkaran Survei Indonesia being considered as an influential political institution in Indonesia, especially as its role as the pioneer of such form of institution in Indonesia.

== The foundation of LSI ==
According to Tempo Newspaper, LSI was founded in 2005 by Denny JA. Before founding LSI, Denny founded Lembaga Survei Indonesia and served as its Director. Denny JA founded Lingkaran Survei Indonesia as a statement that a survey and consultancy institution can be profitable. The Swa Sembada Magazine wrote that Denny wished to build an institution not only focusing on committing political survey but can also perform political consultancy. Armed with the experience of securing the victory for the team that made Susilo Bambang Yudhoyono's claim to presidency possible in 2004, Denny JA founded LSI with the focus of doing political surveys as well as providing political consultancy for political parties and candidates.

As survey institution, Lingkaran Survei Indonesia (LSI) provides aid for political parties and individuals in mapping their own strengths and weaknesses. Various political parties, such as Partai Golkar, have used LSI's survey results as consideration in choosing which candidates should be supported in District Head General Election (Pilkada.) As political consultant, LSI's first client was Ismeth Abdullah, who was elected as Governor of Riau Islands in 2005. Afterwards, LSI has provided aid to various clients from legislative members to district head candidates. Until 2013, LSI worked with 24 governors and 55 mayors/regents who were later elected.

Currently, Lingkaran Survei Indonesia (LSI) has developed six subsidiaries: Lingkaran Survei Indonesia (LSI), Konsultan Citra Indonesia (KCI), Lingkaran Survei Kebijakan Publik (LSKP), Citra Publik Indonesia (CPI), Citra Publik Advertising (CPA), and Citra Komunikasi LSI (Cikom).

Lingkaran Survei Indonesia

Lembaga Survei Kebijakan Publik

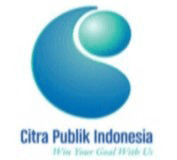
Citra Publik Indonesia

Konsultan Citra Indonesia

Citra Publik Advertising

Citra Komunikasi LSI

== Political survey ==
From 2004 to 2012, LSI conducted over 800 voter behavioral surveys across Indonesia for a variety of clients, including political parties, presidential candidates, legislative bodies candidates and district head candidates. Republika Newspaper even designed the title of “Political Foreseer” to Lingkaran Survei Indonesia (LSI) due to its ability to predict the correct victors on various elections far before the real results are announced and published. Museum Rekor Indonesia (MURI—Indonesian Museum of Records) awarded five awards to LSI due to its accuracy in predicting various election results: (1) The 1st Accurate Advertised Survey Predictions for 2005's District Head Election on the Riau Province, (2) The 1st Accurate Advertised Legislative Election Survey Prediction on 2009, (3) The 1st Accurate Advertised Presidential Election Survey Predictions on 2009, (4) The Most Amount of Accurate Advertised Survey Predictions of District Head Elections in One Season of District Head Election (13 elections from 2005 to 2008), (5) The Research Institute with the Most 100% Accurately Predicted Surveys in One Month, (6) correct predictions in March 2006

== Political consultant ==
LSI began work as a political consultant in 2005. After LSI, similar institutions emerged, including Indobarometer, Fox Indonesia, Polmark Indonesia and Milenium Cipta Citra.

== Quick Count ==
LSI conducts Quick Counts during General Elections and District Head Elections (Pilkada.) The vast and geographical nature of Indonesia tend to cause delayed announcements of election results—typically, those results can only be known around 2 weeks or even 1 month after the election. Once, people required a significant amount of time in order to finding out the victors of such elections, and this can cause a less than conducive atmosphere on the political situation on areas where those elections are held. Participants of the elections may take numerous visits to the office The General Election Commission (KPU) demanding the results—visits that are often accompanied with violence and demonstration, which in turn will cause a domino effect on the stability of the region (either economically or socially.) These undesirable possibilities of outcomes can be mitigated by using Quick Count: a rapid counting method using scientifically collected results from voting locations (TPS) during elections Done correctly, Quick Count can achieve a result with less than 1% margin of error compared to the official results announced by the General Election Commission (KPU). Through Quick Count, result calculation can be finished very rapidly—at the very least, only 4 hours after the votes are officially collected and counted the results can already be summarized and concluded.

Since 2005, LSI has conducted hundreds of Quick Counts and made the results available via press conferences and national television channels TV One and Metro TV. The Indonesia Museum of Record (MURI) gifted LSI with various awards such as (1) The Quick Count Accuracy for Sumbawa Election in November 2010 with 0% margin of error when compared to official results. . Before that record, Lingkaran Survei Indonesia has also achieved a record for Quick Count results for the District Head Election on East Tanjung Jabung, Jambi, with only 0.05% difference when compared to the official results (2) The Fastest Announced Accurate Quick Count results (1 hour post voting period ends) on 2009 Presidential Election. This Quick Count was broadcast live by TV One. (3) The first 100 times successively accurate Quick Count results

== Public opinion maker ==
Since 2005, LSI has conducted national surveys to gauge public opinion regarding various public issues/policies, such as democracy, Islam, tolerance and the performance of public institutions.

== Quick Poll ==
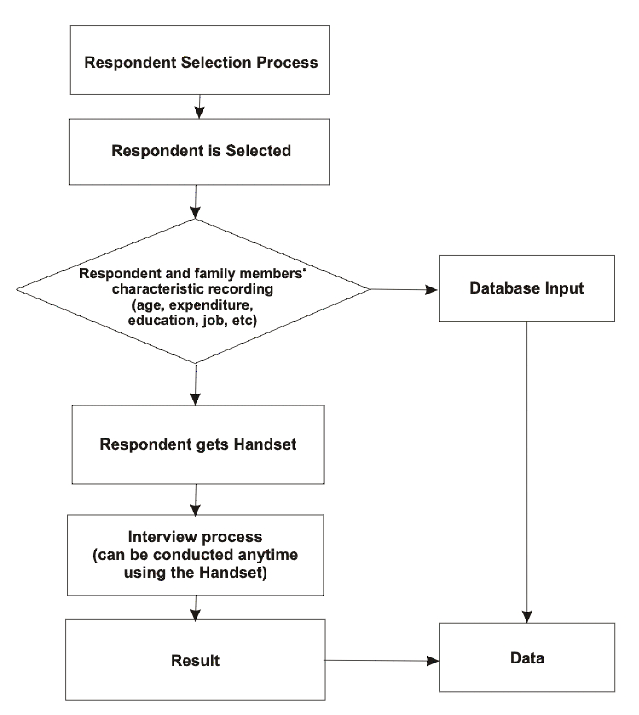
Quick Poll Process

Quick Poll is a type of survey introduced by LSI in 2011. Quick Poll results are routinely broadcast by tvOne every Monday and Thursday"YouTube". www.youtube.com. Quick Poll displays results on how public view recent, up-to-date cases and issues. Quick Poll is a quick survey of public opinion. The main point of difference is that the interview is not done face to face but rather by utilizing handsets connected to all selected respondents. In order to create a representative group of respondents (representing targeted populations in Indonesia), the Quick Poll is conducted in three steps. The first step is the respondent selection process. In this first step, respondents’ characteristic data will be recorded as comprehensively as possible—from job, income, household expenditure, religion, race, education, and any other relevant information. This data includes not only the selected respondent but also his/her members of family. The second step is to give the selected respondent a handset; for a certain kind of respondent however (for example, those who are illiterate or those living in secluded area with no signal), special treatment will be given. The third step is conducting interviews through the handset—all answers from the respondent will be automatically recorded into the server that has been equipped with automatic data processing function able to computerize all data fed into it.
