= List of regencies and cities in East Kalimantan =

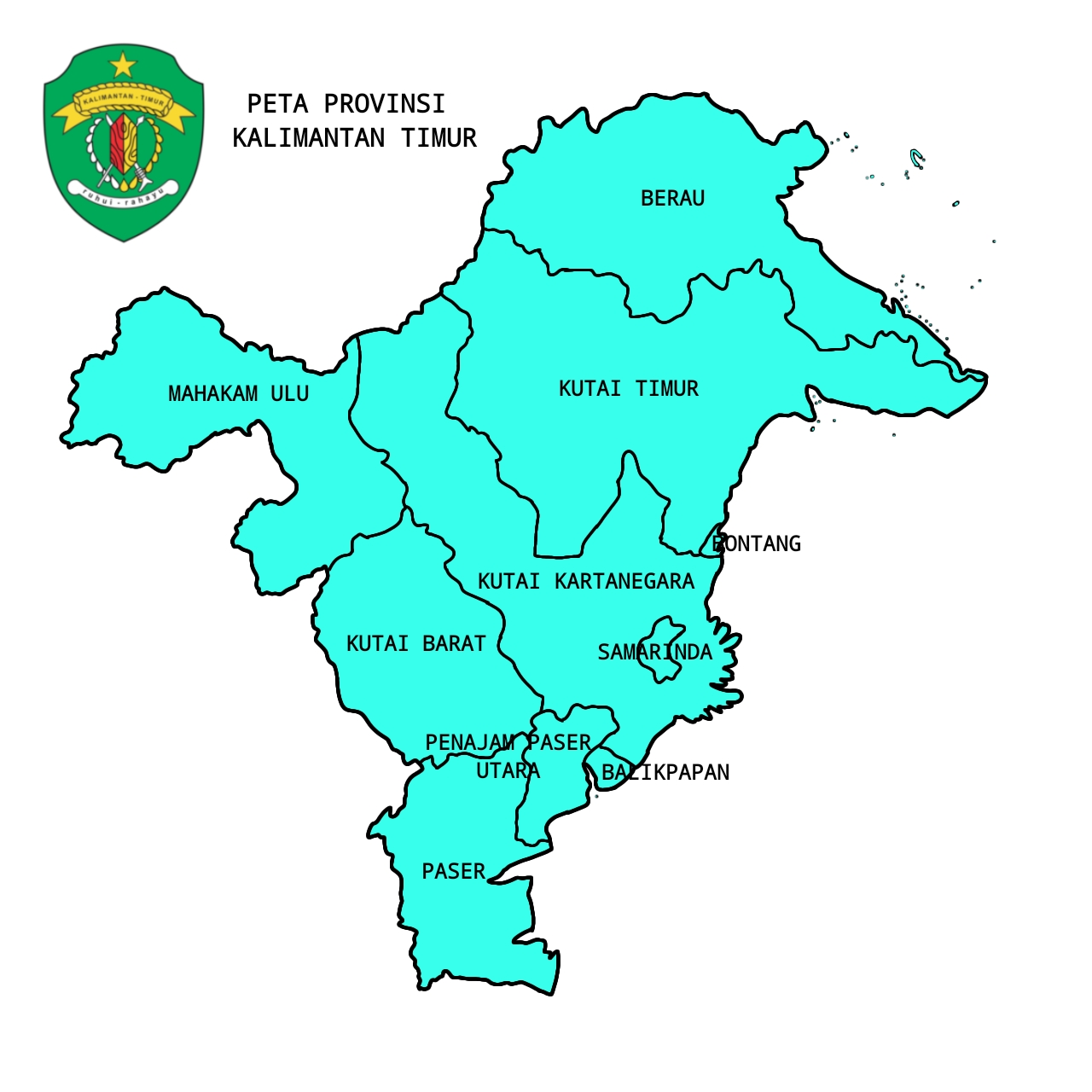
Map of regencies and cities

When originally created, East Kalimantan Province included the territory now comprising North Kalimantan Province, and was composed for three regency-level entities - the special regions of Kutai, Berau and Bulangan - together with the cities of Samarinda and Balikpapan. Beginning in 1999, additional regencies were created as detailed below.

As of 2026, East Kalimantan consists of 7 regencies (kabupaten) and 3 cities (kota). These are listed below with their areas and their populations at the 2010 Census and 2020 Census, together with the official estimates as at mid 2025. The totals below have been adjusted to take account of the removal of North Kalimantan. Cities in this table are marked by grey background, while regencies are left unmarked, both categories are accompanied with regional codes (kode wilayah).

Most significant is the enormous growth in recent years of the population in Penajam North Paser Regency, associated with the development of the new national capital of Nusantara; it is projected to rise to 523,290 by mid 2026. Many of the inhabitants of other regencies and cities throughout the province have moved into Penajam North Paser Regency as a consequence.

== List ==
| Regional code | City or regency name | Area (km^{2}) | Population | | | | Capital | HDI 2019 | Location map | Establishment date |
| Regional code | City or regency name | Area (km^{2}) | 2010 | 2015 | 2020 | 2025 | Capital | HDI 2019 | Location map | Establishment date |
|---|---|---|---|---|---|---|---|---|---|---|
| 64.01 | Paser | 11,603.94 | 230,316 | 261,736 | 275,452 | 289,750 | Tanah Grogot | 0.723 (High) | | 26-06-1959 |
| 64.02 | Kutai Kartanegara | 27,263.10 | 626,680 | 716,319 | 729,382 | 845,620 | Tenggarong | 0.738 (High) | | 26-06-1959 (Note: continues Kutai Self-Government and the Special Region of Kutai (established on 07-01-1953)) |
| 64.03 | Berau | 36,962.37 | 179,079 | 208,394 | 248,035 | 265,300 | Tanjung Redeb | 0.749 (High) | | 26-06-1959 (Note: continues Berau District (kewedanan) and the Special Region of Berau (established on 07-01-1953)) |
| 64.07 | West Kutai (Kutai Barat) | 20,384.60 | 165,934 | 145,728 | 172,288 | 180,300 | Sendawar | 0.716 (High) | | 04-10-1999 |
| 64.08 | East Kutai (Kutai Timur) | 31,239.84 | 255,637 | 318,950 | 434,459 | 470,400 | Sangatta | 0.735 (High) | | 04-10-1999 |
| 64.09 | Penajam North Paser (Penajam Paser Utara) | 3,333.06 | 142,922 | 154,020 | 178,681 | 400,030 | Penajam | 0.716 (High) | | 10-04-2002 |
| 64.12 | Mahakam Ulu | 18,427.81 | | 25,946 | 32,513 | 34,740 | Ujoh Bilang | 0.676 (Medium) | | 11-01-2013 |
| 64.71 | Balikpapan | 511.01 | 557,579 | 614,663 | 688,318 | 725,440 | Balikpapan | 0.801 (Very High) | | 26-06-1959 |
| 64.72 | Samarinda | 718.00 | 727,500 | 811,314 | 827,994 | 865,310 | Samarinda | 0.802 (Very High) | | 26-06-1959 |
| 64.74 | Bontang | 161.88 | 143,683 | 165,606 | 178,917 | 190,710 | Bontang | 0.801 (Very High) | | 04-10-1999 |
| | Totals | 127,346.92 | 3,028,487 | 3,422,676 | 3,766,039 | 4,267,600 | Samarinda | 0.766 (High) | | 26-11-1956 |

As of July 2023, the new capital of Nusantara (tentatively designated Ibu Kota Nusantara or IKN) has not officially gazetted separate as a jurisdiction per Interior Ministry in practice, but is reported to cover 2,561 km^{2}. including 682 km^{2} of sea; it includes a central likely government heavy area named KIPP with IKN, would occupy 66.7 km^{2} and 200,000 strong staffers and families from Jakarta.

The province forms one of Indonesia's 84 national electoral districts to elect members to the People's Representative Council. The East Kalimantan Electoral District consists of the entire province (at-large), and elects 8 members to the People's Representative Council. For the present Parliament, this includes the area and population of the newly designated national capital of Nusantara.

== History ==
During its first years since its creation on 29 November 1956, East Kalimantan was composed of three regency-level special regions — Kutai, Berau and Bulongan — all of them were led by the respective sultans and first legally created on 7 January 1953. Later on 26 June 1959, Balikpapan and Samarinda were split from the outgoing Special Region of Kutai, while Pasir (later known as Paser since 2007) was split from Kotabaru Regency in South Kalimantan and transferred to East Kalimantan, therefore increasing its number to six. At the same time, special statuses of each regency were removed. Unlike most other regencies in the region, Berau has never been carved up since its legal establishment more than 7 decades ago.

On 24 April 1969, transfers of several districts occurred between Kutai, Samarinda and Balikpapan. Muara Jawa, Palaran, Sanga-Sanga Dalam, and major parts of Samboja were given to Samarinda, while another part of Samboja (such as Teritip) and the entirety of Penajam (subsequently renamed as Balikpapan Seberang) was given to Balikpapan. On 21 October 1987, another administrative transfers occurred, of which Samarinda returned the aforementioned districts to Kutai (except Palaran, in exchange, the city received several villages from Anggana, Sanga-Sanga and Loa Janan), while Pasir received Penajam (then known as Balikpapan Seberang).

On 12 December 1981, its first administrative city (kota administratif), Tarakan was formed, and at the same time, the former district of Tarakan was divided into three: Bunyu (not part of the administrative city), East Tarakan, West Tarakan. Less than eight years later, on 1 December 1989, the administrative city of Bontang was formed, but also with more complicated district splits. The former district of Bontang was mostly trifurcated into Sangatta (now part of East Kutai), North Bontang, and South Bontang (the last two now part of contemporary Bontang), while the three villages south of South Bontang were transferred to Muara Badak, now part of Marang Kayu.

On 8 October 1997, a third city – Tarakan – was created from part of Bulungan Regency. On 4 October 1999 a fourth city – Bontang – was created from part of Kutai Regency, while four new regencies were created – Malinau and Nunukan from parts of Bulungan, and East Kutai and West Kutai from the remaining parts of Kutai Regency.

Two further regencies were set up – Penajam North Paser from northern parts of Pasir on 10 April 2002, and Tana Tidung from northern parts of Bulungan on 17 July 2007. In the similar timeline, Kutai was renamed to Kutai Kartanegara on 23 March 2002, while Pasir was renamed to Paser on 22 August 2007. By early 2012 therefore, East Kalimantan was divided into ten regencies and four cities.

On 22 October 2012, the Indonesian House of Representatives agreed to the creation of a new province out of the four most northerly of the Regencies in East Kalimantan, namely Bulungan, Malinau, Nunukan and Tana Tidung, together with one city, Tarakan. Accordingly, these were split off to form the new province of North Kalimantan on 25 October 2012 (it was legally created on 17 November 2012).

The existing West Kutai Regency was then split into two on 11 January 2013, with the northern districts split off to form Mahakam Ulu, thus leaving the following seven regencies and three cities to comprise the reduced East Kalimantan.

== Proposals ==
In the early days of the Kutai Regency in 1960s, there was a proposal to split the regency into three: Kutai Pantai (lit. "littoral Kutai", capital: Samboja), Ulu Mahakam (not to be confused with present-day Mahakam Ulu, capital: Barong Tongkok), and Kutai with residual territory. However, these proposals had faded following the 30 September Movement, resulting on the arrest of Colonel Lieutenant Toni Soekartono, one of the advocates for the formation of Kutai Pantai Regency. On 24 April 1969, through a gubernatorial decree, the Kutai Regency transferred several of its districts to Samarinda and Balikpapan, due to the fact that both cities were the capitals of East Kutai and South Kutai districts (kewedanaan), while their borders previously remained unclear for almost a decade.

The following gallery includes the subsequent proposals for new cities and regencies in East Kalimantan (following the separation of North Kalimantan from East Kalimantan):

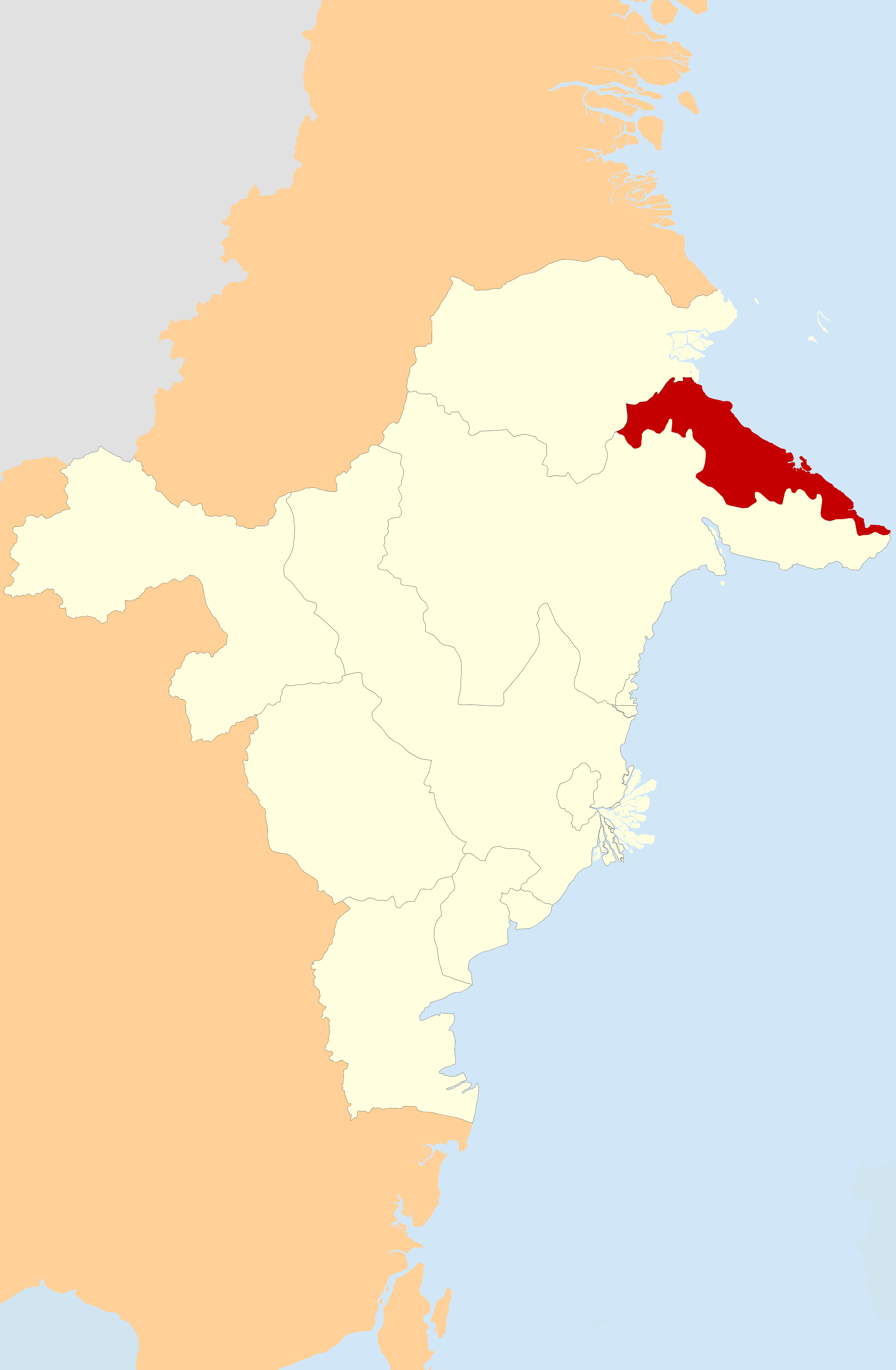
South Coast Berau Regency (Indonesian: Kabupaten Berau Pesisir Selatan)
Proposed capital: Talisayan

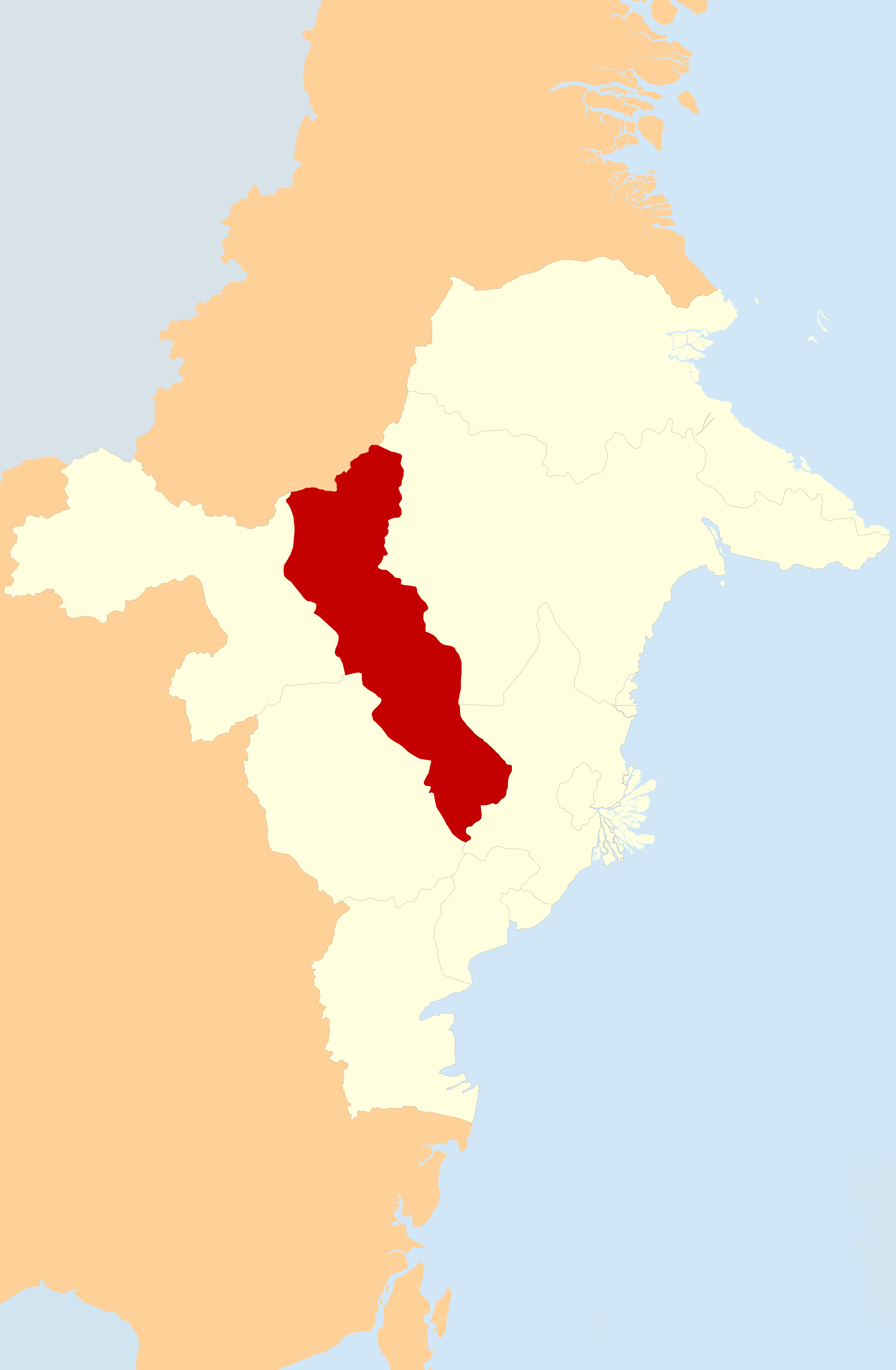
Central Kutai Regency (Indonesian: Kabupaten Kutai Tengah)
Proposed capital: Kota Bangun

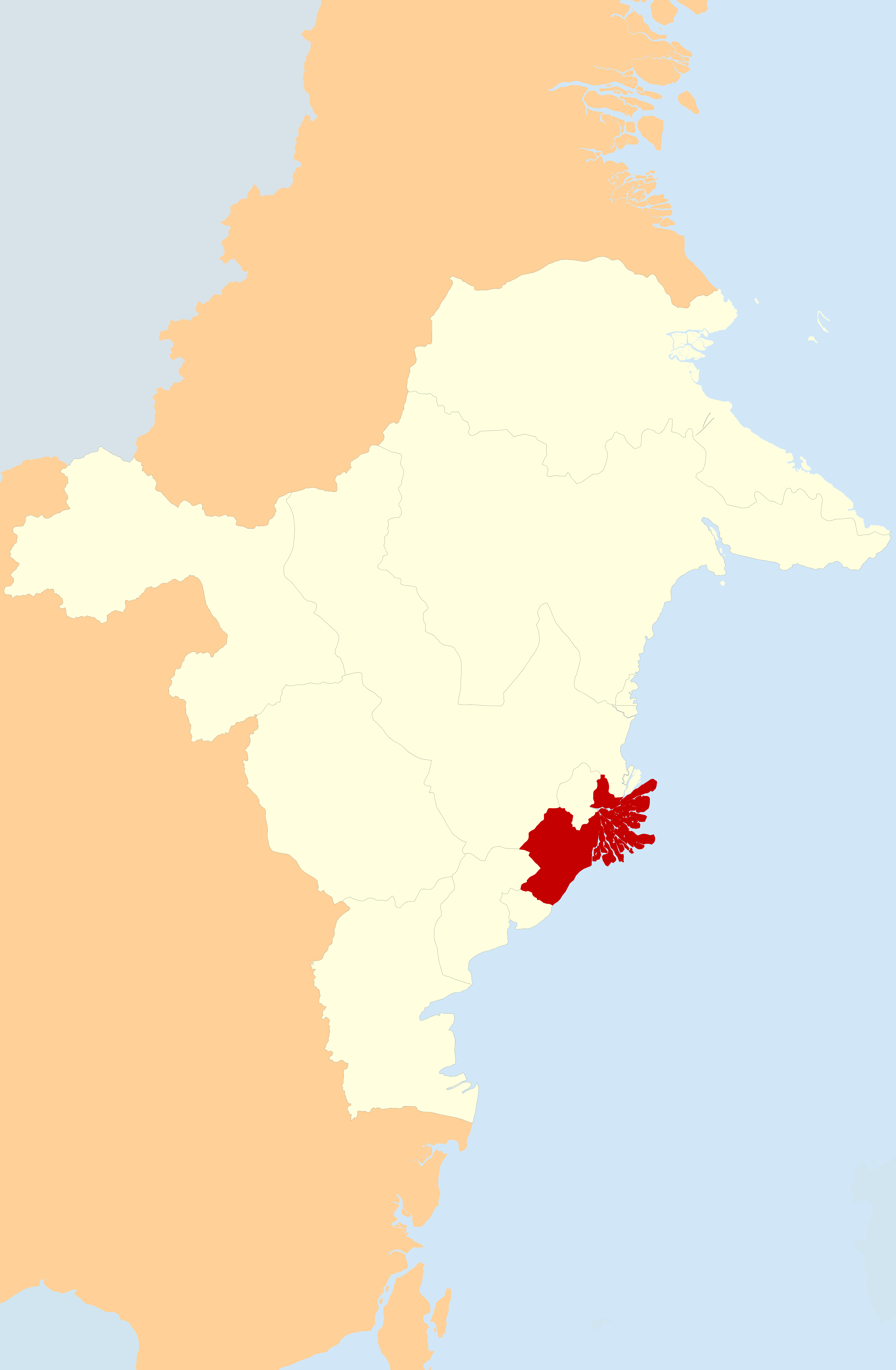
Coastal Kutai Regency (Indonesian: Kabupaten Kutai Pesisir)
Proposed capital: Anggana

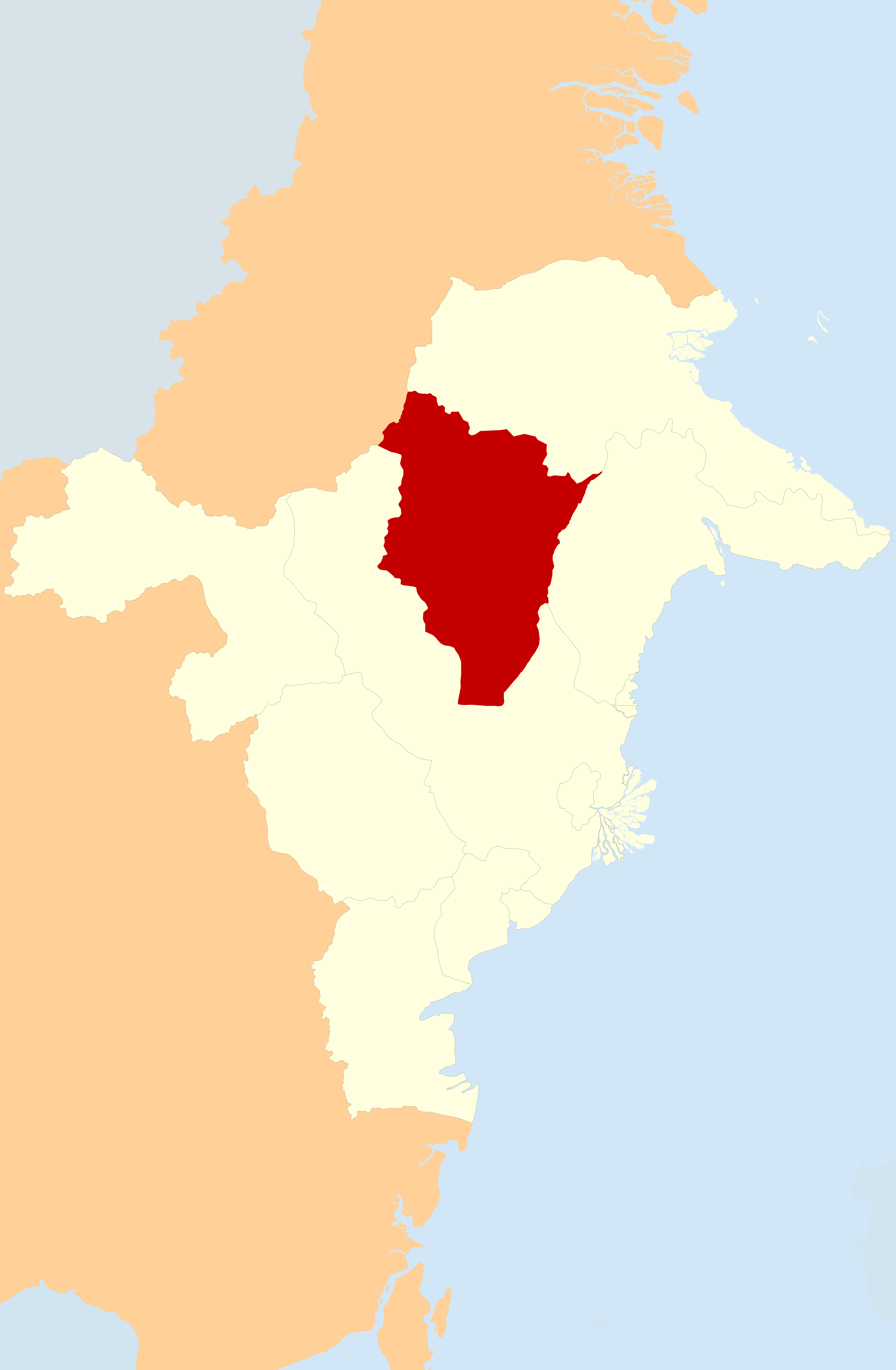
North Kutai Regency (Indonesian: Kabupaten Kutai Utara)
Proposed capital: Muara Wahau

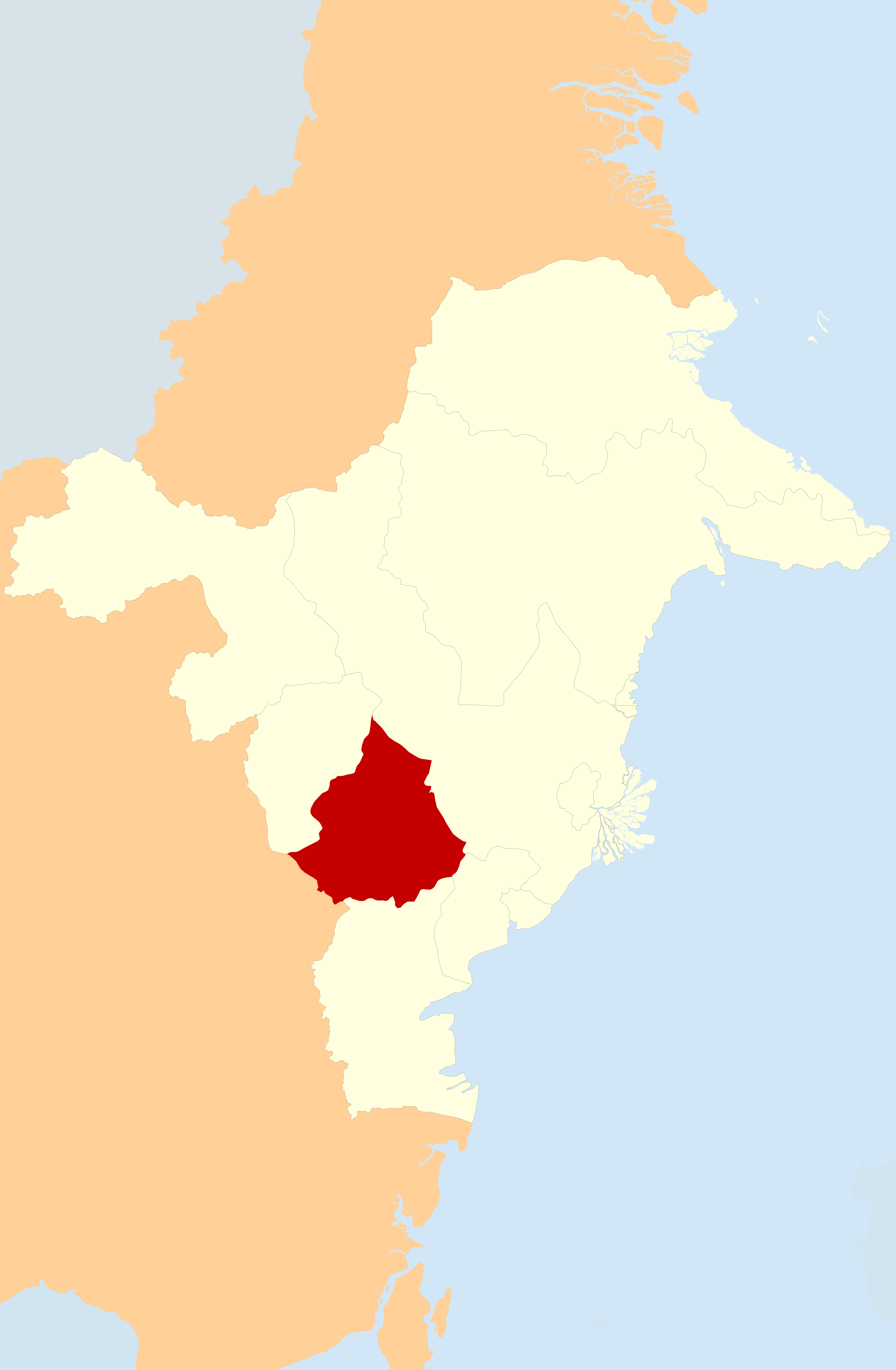
Kutai Benua Raya Regency (Indonesian: Kabupaten Kutai Benua Raya)

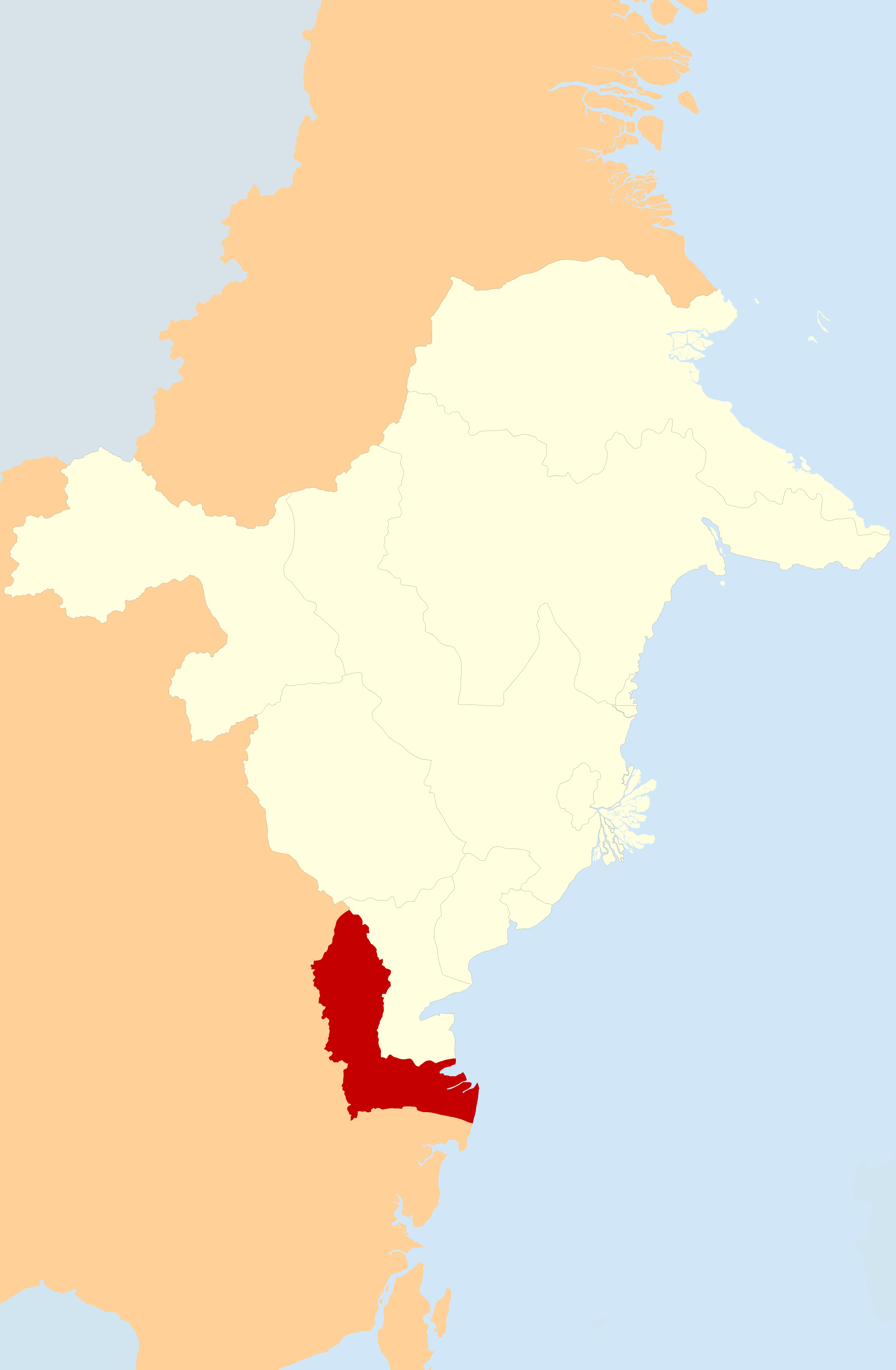
South Paser Regency (Indonesian: Kabupaten Paser Selatan)
Proposed capital: Batu Sopang

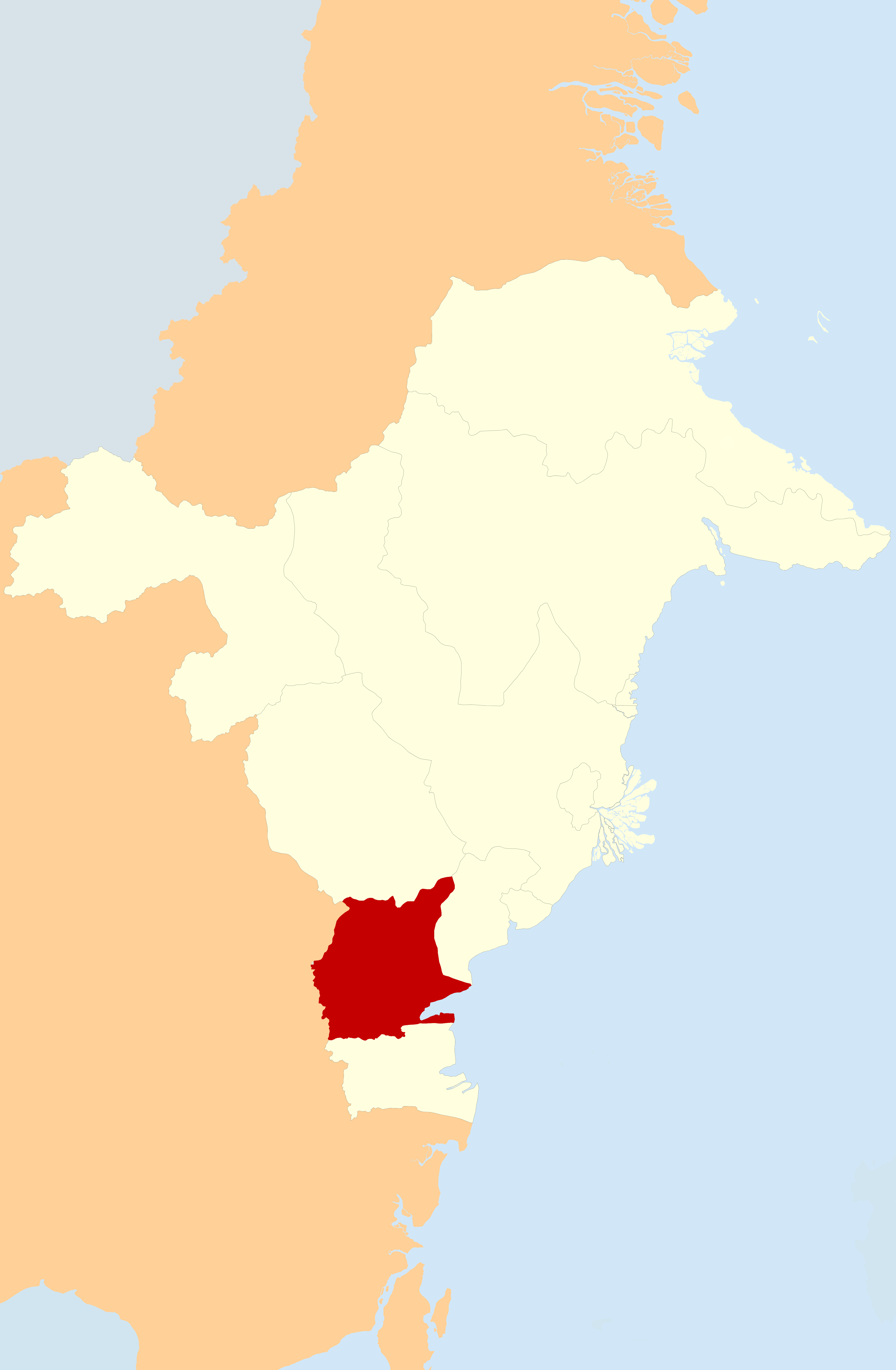
Central Paser Regency (Indonesian: Kabupaten Paser Tengah)
Proposed capital: Kuaro

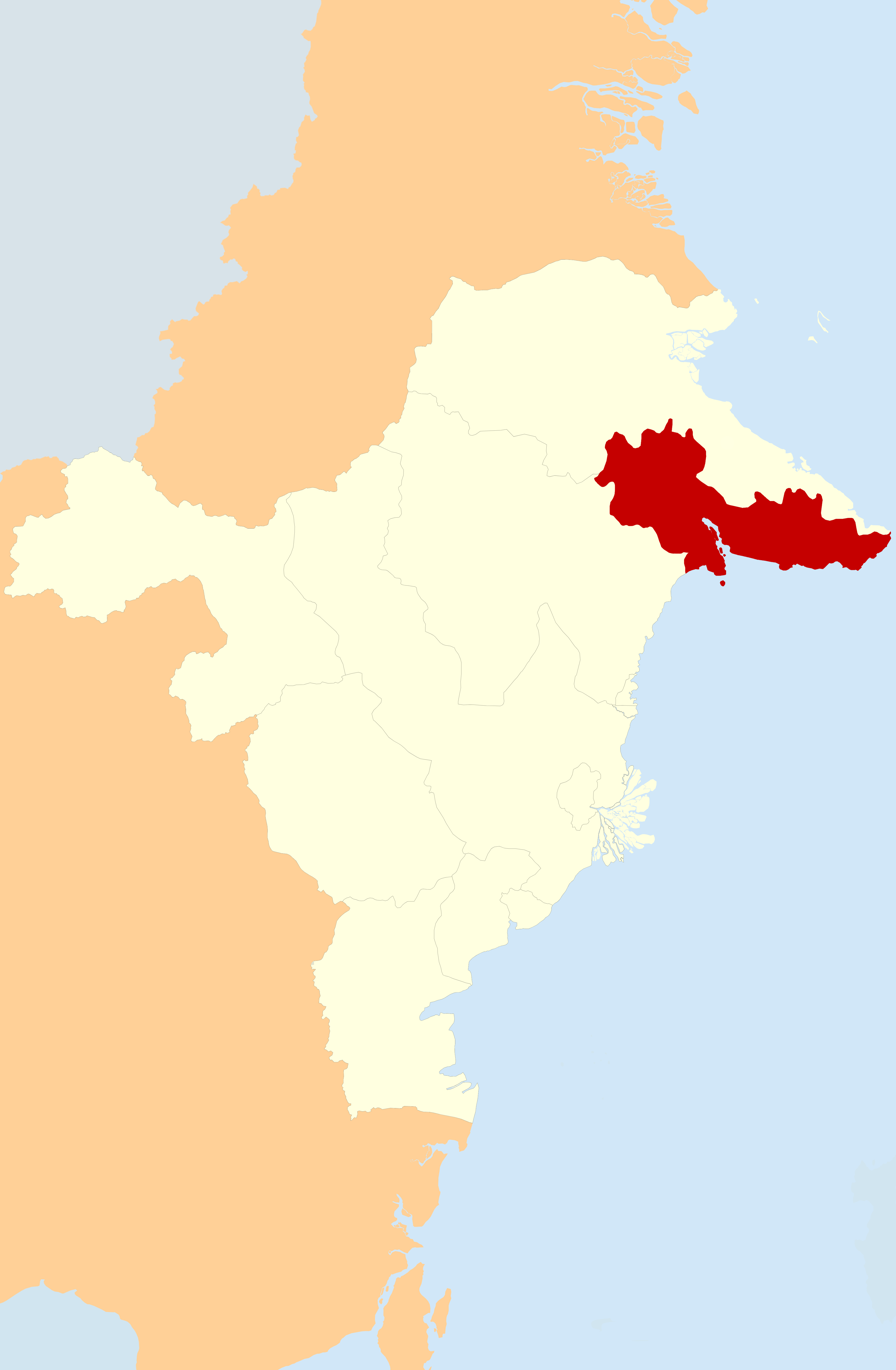
Sangkulirang Regency (Indonesian: Kabupaten Sangkulirang)
Proposed capital: Sangkulirang

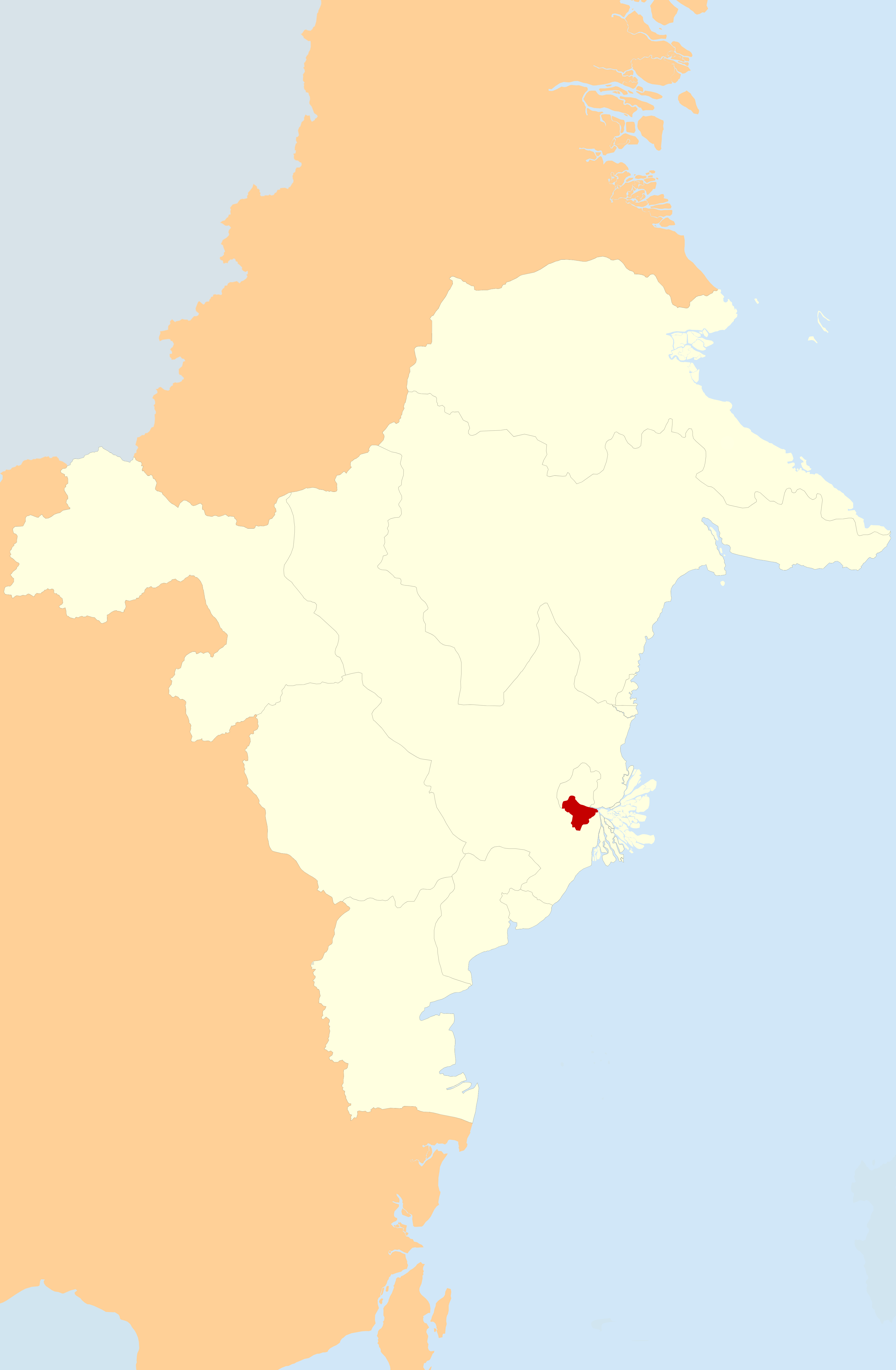
City of Samarendah (Indonesian: Kota Samarendah)

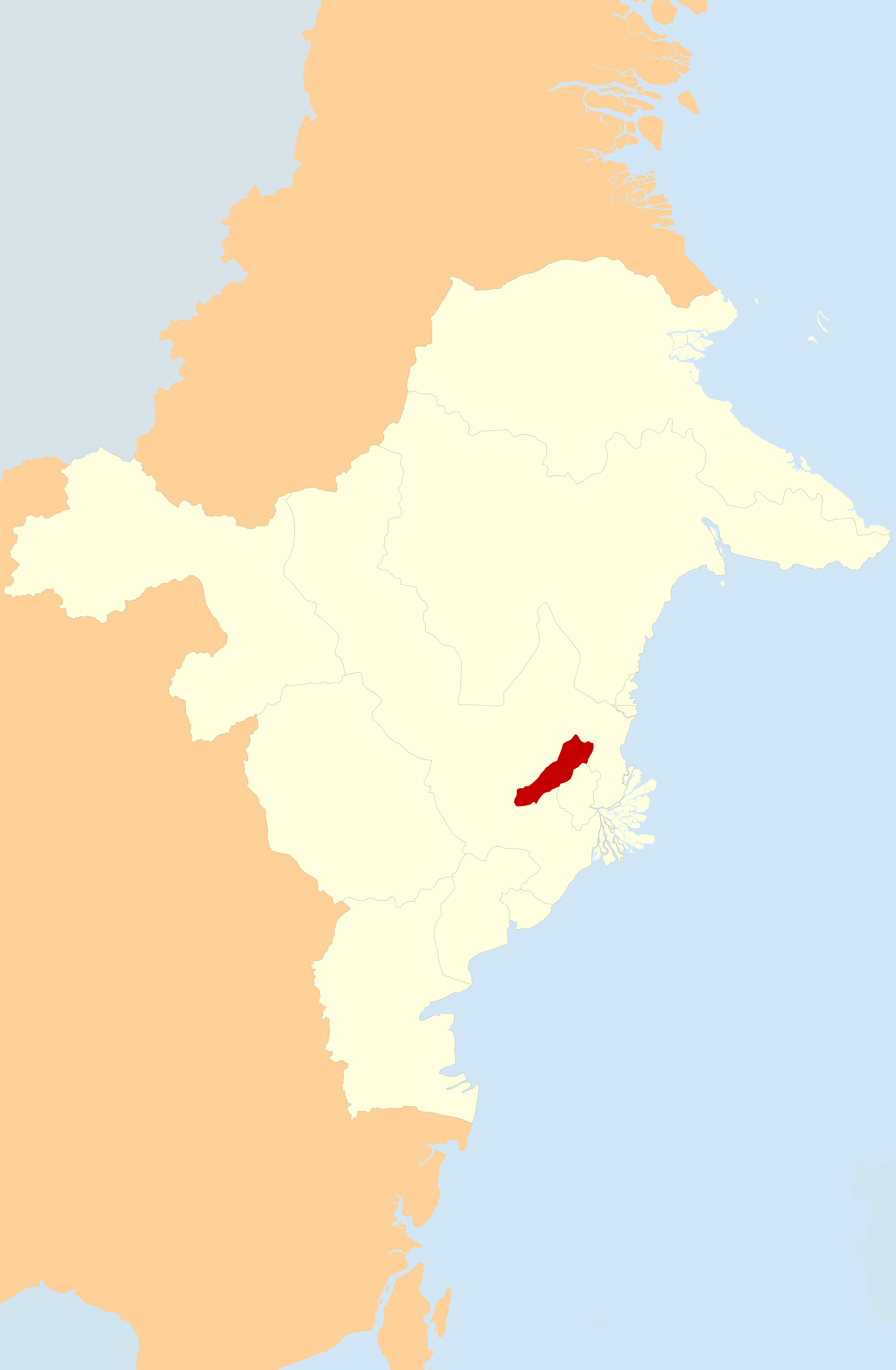
City of Tenggarong (Indonesian: Kota Tenggarong)

The proposed South Coast Berau Regency would comprise those districts from the existing Berau Regency situated along the north coast of the Sumbaliung Peninsula, i.e. the Districts of Tabalar, Biantan, Talisayan, Batu Putih and Biduk Biduk.
The proposed Central Kutai Regency would comprise those districts along the middle reaches of the Mahakam river, i.e. the Districts of Tabang, Tembang Janggut, Kenohan, Muara Wis, Kota Bangun and Kota Bangun Darat.
The proposed Coastal Kutai Regency would comprise the districts situated along the coast east of Samarendah city and to the immediate south of that city, i.e. the Districts of Muara Dadak, Anggana, Sanga-Sanga, Muara Jawa, Loa Janan and Semboja.
The proposed North Kutai Regency would comprise the entire western (inland) half of the existing East Kutai Regency, possibly with the addition of Muara Kaman District from Kutai Kartanegara Regency.

== See also ==
- List of districts of East Kalimantan
