= Muara Kaman =

- District
- Interactive map of Muara Kaman
- Country: Indonesia
- Province: East Kalimantan
- Regency: Kutai Kartanegara
- District seat: Muara Kaman Ulu

Area
  - Total: 3,410.13 km^{2} (1,316.66 sq mi)

Population (2025)
  - Total: 49,317
  - Density: 14.462/km^{2} (37.456/sq mi)
- Time zone: UTC+8 (ICT)
- Regional code: 64.02.11
- Villages: 8

Muara Kaman is an administrative district (kecamatan) in Kutai Kartanegara Regency, East Kalimantan, Indonesia. It covers a total land area of 3,410.13 km^{2}, and as of 2025, it was inhabited by 49,317 people. Its district seat is located at the village of Muara Kaman Ulu.

The district is situated to the northwest of the major city of Samarinda and the regency capital of Tenggarong, and borders East Kutai Regency to the northwest and northeast, the districts of Marang Kayu and Sebulu to the southeast, and the districts of Kota Bangun and Kenohan to the west.

== Villages ==
Muara Kaman District is divided into the following twenty villages (all classed as desa), listed below with their areas and their populations as at mid 2024:

Regional code (Kode wilayah)	Name	Area (km^{2})	Pop'n (2024)	RT (rukun tetangga)
64.02.11.2004	Benua Puhun	117.11	3,299	10
64.02.11.2003	Teratak	250.76	1,789	12
64.02.11.2014	Bunga Jadi	60.00	1,812	28
64.02.11.2013	Panca Jaya	39.19	3,050	27
64.02.11.2012	Sido Mukti	60.00	3,721	25
64.02.11.2006	Sabintulung	91.62	4,158	20
64.02.11.2002	Rantau Hempang	268.59	1,390	10
64.02.11.2001	Muara Kaman Ilir	179.90	1,002	19
64.02.11.2005	Muara Kaman Ulu	339.86	2,815	19
64.02.11.2008	Tunjungan	311.86	1,230	8
64.02.11.2007	Muara Siran	229.05	1,472	8
64.02.11.2009	Sedulang	201.66	3,375	10
64.02.11.2010	Menamang Kiri	352.59	4,321	5
64.02.14.2011	Menamang Kanan	338.59	4,024	6
64.02.11.2016	Lebaho Ulaq	117.10	923	6
64.02.11.2015	Kupang Baru	149.00	1,306	6
64.02.11.2019	Puan Cepak	89.95	1,122	6
64.02.11.2017	Bukit Jering	121.66	991	7
64.02.11.2018	Liang Buaya	91.62	2,829	7
64.02.11.2020	Cipari Makmur	-	1,680	12
	Totals	3,410.13	46,309	251
