= Sebulu =

District of Kutai Kartanegara Regency, East Kalimantan

- District
- Interactive map of Sebulu
- Location in Kalimantan and Indonesia Sebulu (Indonesia)
- Coordinates: 0°11′33.77″S 116°59′22.25″E
- Country: Indonesia
- Province: East Kalimantan
- Regency: Kutai Kartanegara Regency
- Established: 12 May 1995

Area
  - Total: 859.50 km^{2} (331.85 sq mi)

Population (mid 2025)
  - Total: 46,573
  - Density: 54.186/km^{2} (140.34/sq mi)
- Time zone: UTC+8 (ICT)
- Regional code: 64.02.07
- Villages: 18

Sebulu is an administrative district (kecamatan) of the Kutai Kartanegara Regency, East Kalimantan, Indonesia. It is located between 116º 39’ and 115º 45’ East and between 0º 3’ and 0º33’ South. Its borders are with the following districts of the regency:

- North: Kecamatan Marang Kayu
- East: Kecamatan Tenggarong
- South: Kecamatan Kota Bangun
- West: Kabupaten Muara Kaman

As of mid 2025, it was inhabited by 46,573 people, and currently has a total area of 859.50 km^{2}. Its district seat is located at the village of Sebulu Ilir.

The district was formed on 12 May 1995 from northern parts of Tenggarong District and it initially consisted of thirteen administrative villages (desa); a fourteenth desa - Mekar Jaya - was subsequently created from part of Sanggulan desa.

== Governance ==
=== Villages ===
Sebulu District is now divided into the following fourteen villages (desa), listed below with their areas and populations as at mid 2023:

Regional code (Kode wilayah)	Name	Area (km^{2})	Pop'n (2023)	RT (rukun tetangga)
64.02.07.2001	Selerong	99.7	1,697	11
64.02.07.2002	Tanjong Harapan	42.1	1,410	8
64.02.07.2003	Beloro	142.5	2,562	12
64.02.07.2004	Sebulu Ulu	125.8	4,556	15
64.02.07.2008	Manunggal Daya	28.0	5,062	26
64.02.07.2007	Sumber Sari	70.0	5,778	24
64.02.07.2005	Sebulu Ilir	103.5	2,788	16
64.02.07.2006	Segihan	15.2	3,192	11
64.02.07.2009	Giri Agung	26.9	2,717	16
64.02.07.2010	Senoni	40.0	3,289	17
64.02.07.2011	Sebulu Modern	55.5	4,198	15
64.02.07.2012	Sanggulan	80.3	2,819	20
64.02.07.2013	Lekaq Kidau	30.0	464	5
64.02.07.2014	Mekar Jaya	^{(a)}	2,375	12
	Totals	859.5	42,906	209

Note: (a) the area of Merkar Jaya desa is included in the figure for Sanggulan desa, from which it was cut out in 2012.
