= Muara Badak =

District of Kutai Kartanegara Regency, East Kalimantan

- District
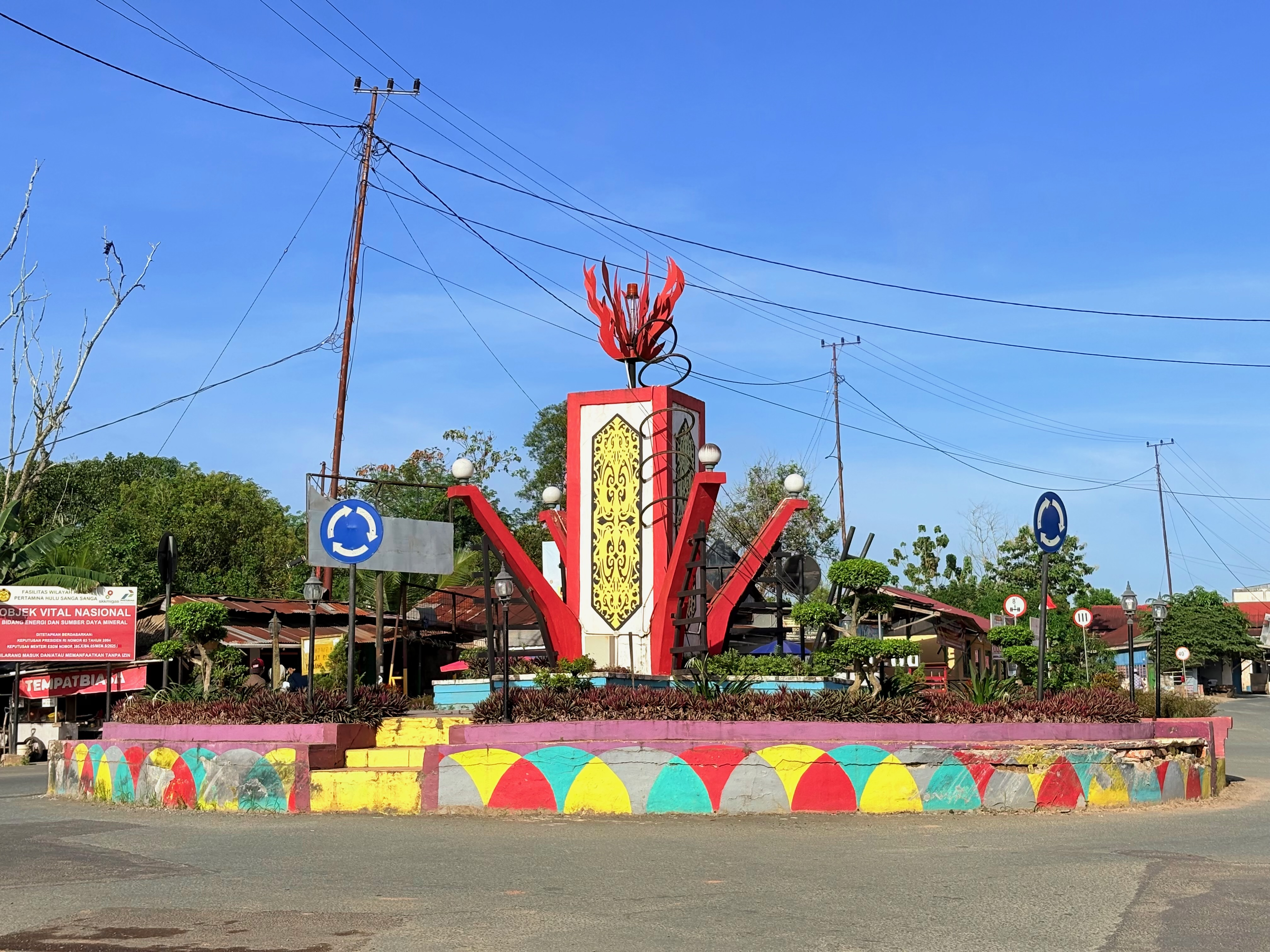
- Six-way Intersection Monument, Muara Badak
- Interactive map of Muara Badak
- Location Muara Badak (Kalimantan) Muara Badak (Indonesia)
- Coordinates: 0.2508°S 117.3266°E
- Country: Indonesia
- Province: East Kalimantan
- Regency: Kutai Kartanegara
- Settled: 1806
- District seat: Muara Badak Ulu

Government
  - District head (Camat): Arpan

Area
  - Total: 781.52 km^{2} (301.75 sq mi)

Population (2024)
  - Total: 49,428
  - Density: 63.246/km^{2} (163.81/sq mi)
- Time zone: UTC+8 (ICT)
- Regional code: 64.02.05
- Villages: 14

Muara Badak (Indonesian pronunciation: [muˈ(w)ara ˈbadaʔ]) is an administrative district (kecamatan) of Kutai Kartanegara Regency, in East Kalimantan Province of Indonesia. It covers a land area of 781.52 km^{2} and, as at mid 2024, it was inhabited by 49,428 people. Its district seat is located at the village of Muara Badak Ulu.

Muara Badak borders the city of Samarinda (specifically the district of North Samarinda) to the southwest, the district of Anggana to the southeast, the Strait of Makassar to the east, the district of Marang Kayu to the north and the district of Tenggarong Seberang to the west. Natural gas reserves were discovered by Huffco in 1972, and as a result, the district gave its name to the state-owned corporation Badak LNG, which is active at Bontang.

== History ==
Although the name Muara Badak literally translates to "Rhinoceros Estuary", some theories disputed this etymology, due to the fact that there is no clear evidence about the existence of rhinoceros there. The individuals from this species did actually exist as late as the 1970s in the nearby district of Bontang (now defunct, and this is where the Kutai National Park is located) as well as Sangkulirang, until they were extirpated from logging activities. Some theories connected instead to the tree tempura badak (now extinct), or the phrase attributed to the sultan of Kutai when first visiting this region in 1806 or 1825, "Badak leh... bagus beneh tempat ini yo!".

Very little is known about the history of Muara Badak until the second half of the 20th century. On 1 December 1989, at the same time when Bontang was formed as an administrative city, three villages, namely Central Santan (Santan Tengah), Santan Ilir, and Santan Ulu were transferred from the former district of Bontang to Muara Badak. Six and a half years later, on 11 June 1996, the northern parts of Muara Badak (consisting of the three previously mentioned villages, plus Sebuntal and Kersik) were separated off to form the new district of Marang Kayu.

In recent years, local organizations such as Muara Badak Youth Movement (GPMB), have demanded that the district secede from Kutai Kartanegara, due to resource curse issues.

== Governance ==
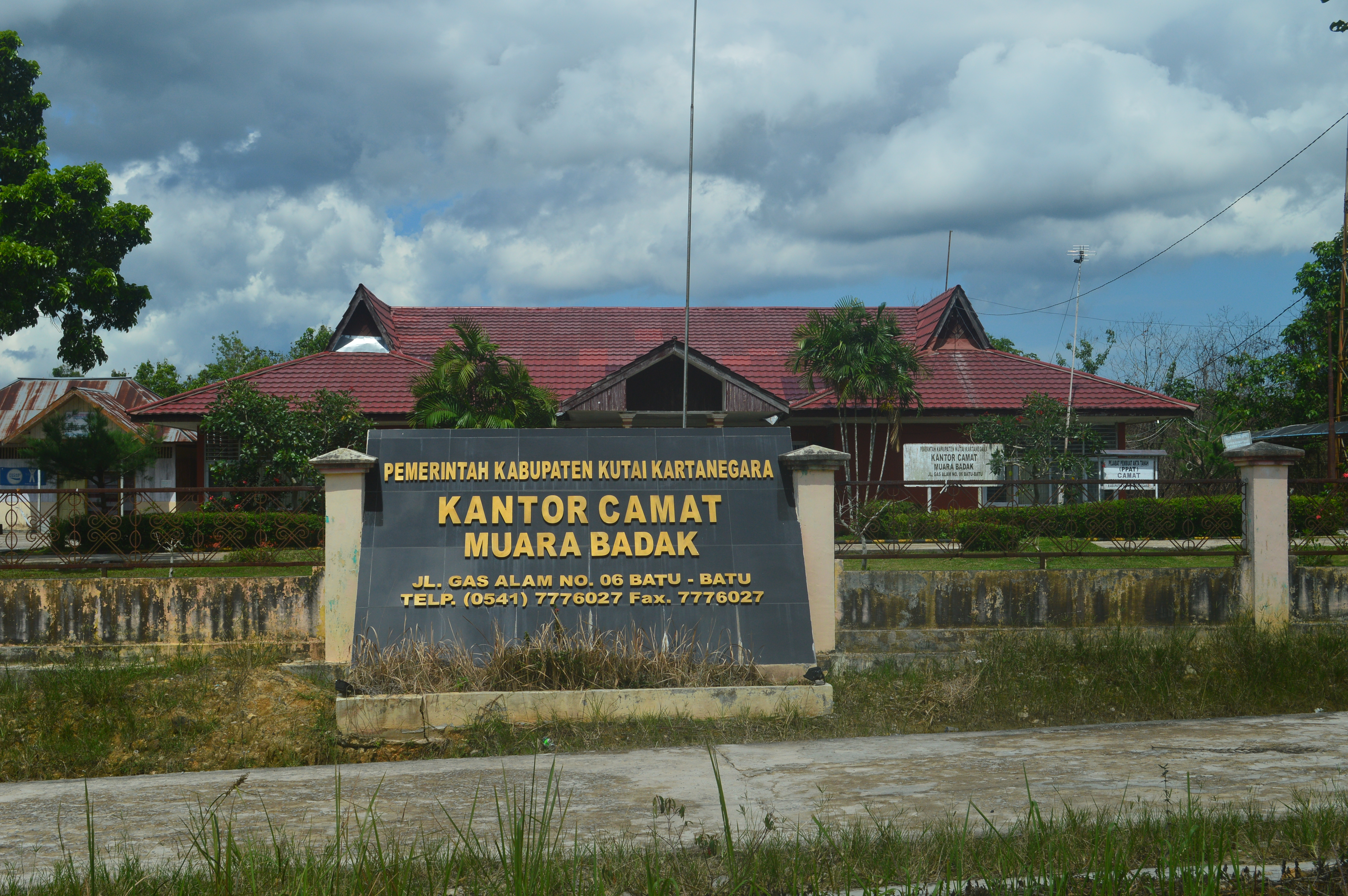
District head office at Batu-Batu, Muara Badak.

=== Villages ===
Muara Badak is divided into the following fourteen villages (classed as rural desa):

Regional code (Kode wilayah)	Name	Area (km^{2})	Pop'n (2024)	Hamlets (dusun)	RT (rukun tetangga)
64.02.05.2001	Saliki	198.08	5,186	2	11
64.02.05.2002	Salo Palai	104.51	2,096	2	9
64.02.05.2003	Muara Badak Ulu	75.19	5,074	2	17
64.02.05.2004	Muara Badak Ilir	5.79	5,197	1	18
64.02.05.2005	Tanjung Limau	95.70	4,794	2	17
64.02.05.2006	Tanah Datar	39.64	2,784	2	11
64.02.05.2007	Badak Baru	12.31	8,979	3	34
64.02.05.2008	Suka Damai	40.31	1,503	2	11
64.02.05.2009	Gas Alam Badak I	4.65	5,445	2	28
64.02.05.2010	Batu-Batu	54.38	1,831	1	6
64.02.05.2011	Badak Mekar	36.96	1,365	2	11
64.02.05.2012	Salo Cella	74.70	2,156	3	12
64.02.05.2013	Sungai Bawang	16.37	1,645	-	5
	Badak Makmur	26.93	1,373	-	5
	Totals	781.52	49,428	24	195

The new desa of Badak Makmur was only created from parts of Muara Badak Ulu on 29 November 2023. Because of this, the regional code is yet to be released for this village.

== Demographics ==
=== Religion ===
Religion in Muara Badak (2023)
1. Islam (94.6%)
2. Protestantism (4.51%)
3. Catholicism (0.85%)
4. Hinduism (0.05%)
5. Buddhism (0.01%)

As of 2023, by far the largest religious group in Muara Badak were Muslims (47,934 people), followed by small minorities including Protestants (2,287 people), Catholics (432 people), Hindus (27 people) and Buddhists (6 people).
