= Mulawarman Museum =

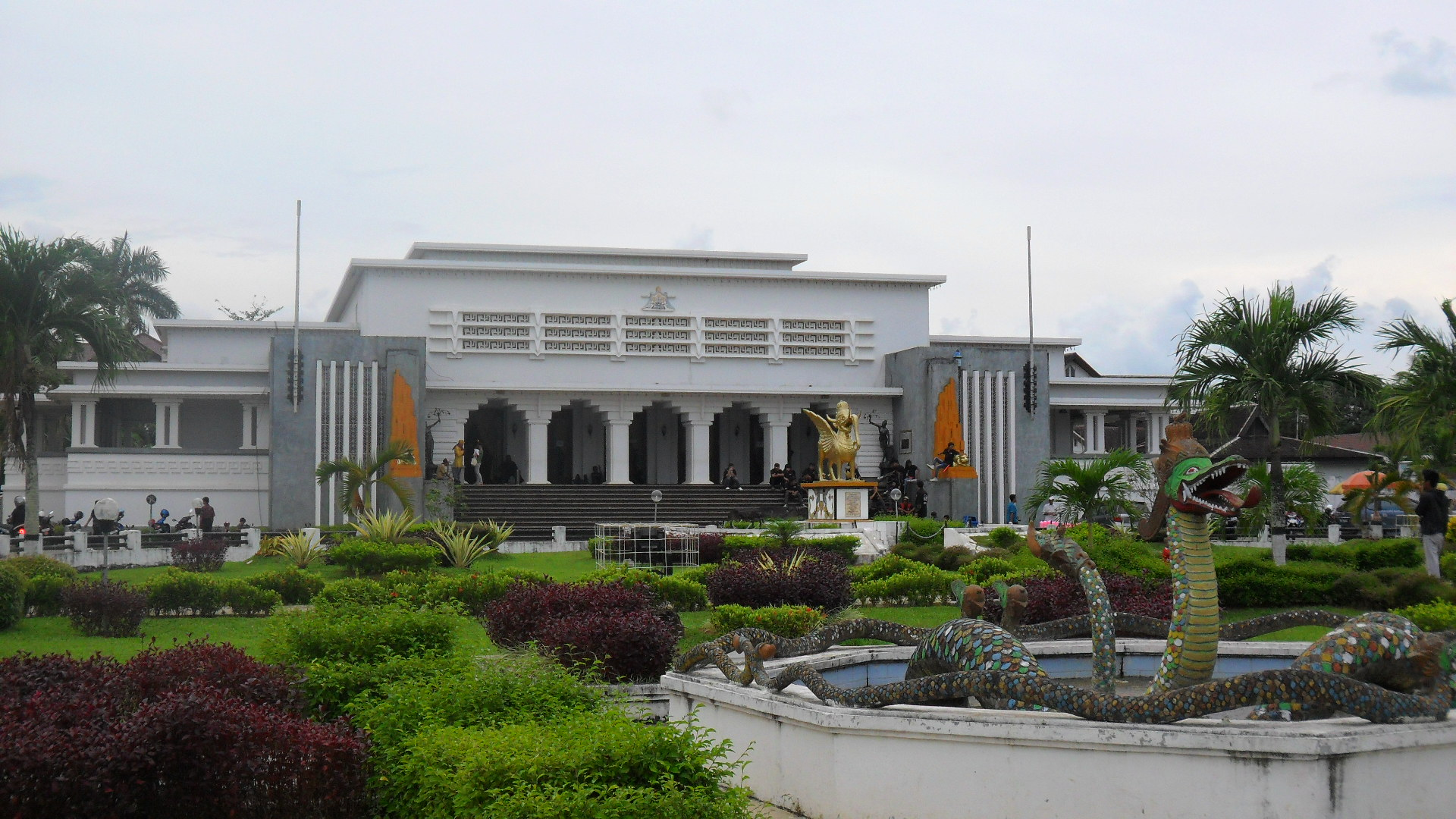
The Mulawarman Museum

The Mulawarman Museum is a museum in Tenggarong, East Kalimantan, Indonesia. It is located near the Mahakam River, in a former palace, constructed by the Dutch during the 1930s that was once the power base where 19 sultans reigned. The museum contains historical statues and antiquities, period furnishings, a richly adorned bedroom with hand-woven 'doyo' fabric, and items from the Ming, Qing and Yuan dynasties. The museum contains the Balinese puppet theatre, which was donated by the Sultan of Yogyakarta.
