= Special Region of Kutai =

Special Region of Kutai Daerah Istimewa Kutai
- Regency-level special region of East Kalimantan, Indonesia
- 1953–1960
- Location of the region, highlighted
- Capital: Samarinda (1950–1956); Tenggarong (1956–1960)
- Area
  - 1953: 100,917.59 km^{2} (38,964.50 sq mi)
- Government
  - Type: Devolved non-sovereign monarchy special region within a unitary republic
- Sultan
  - 1953–1960: Aji Muhammad Parikesit
- History
  - Established: 7 January 1953
  - Dissolved and split into three: 21 January 1960
Preceded by
Kutai Self-Governance
Succeeded by
Kutai Regency
Balikpapan
Samarinda

The Special Region of Kutai (Indonesian: Daerah Istimewa Kutai; pronounced [daˌʔerah ɪst̪iˌmewa ˈkut̪ai̯]) was a regency-level special region within East Kalimantan, Indonesia, that existed from 1953 until 1960. Throughout its existence, it was led by the 19th sultan of Kutai, Aji Muhammad Parikesit.

Its capital was originally located at Samarinda, although by late 1956, it was moved back to its traditional capital of Tenggarong by the local government. The Special Region of Kutai was formed on 7 January 1953 from earlier Kutai Self-Governance (Indonesian: Swapraja Kutai), and it was one of few second-level special regions to have existed in Indonesia, along with the Special Region of Berau and the Special Region of Bulongan, all of them were located in Kalimantan.

However, at the time, its system of government was rejected by the locals, seen as being feudalistic and autocratic. The Special Region of Kutai was slated to be dissolved under the law number 27 of 26 June 1959, nine days before the enactment of President Sukarno's 1959 Decree, which splits the region into Kutai Regency (and its successor Kutai Kartanegara Regency), Balikpapan, and Samarinda. However, its dissolution could only be effective on 21 January 1960, with its head Aji Muhammad Parikesit officially handed over his powers to the three successors at the sultanate of Kutai palace, now the Mulawarman Museum.

The Special Region of Kutai bordered (in anticlockwise direction) the special regions of Berau and Bulongan, the Crown Colony of Sarawak (part of the British Empire), Kapuas Hulu, Barito, and Kotabaru. Due to multiple historical administrative changes, the territory of the Special Region of Kutai now includes East Kutai, Kutai Kartanegara, Mahakam Ulu, and West Kutai regencies; Balikpapan, Bontang, and Samarinda cities; and Penajam—Sepaku (also including Nusantara) districts of Penajam North Paser regency, all of them consist around 79.24% of the current area of East Kalimantan.

== Administrative divisions ==
The Special Region of Kutai was divided into the following 6 kewedanaan (older districts) and 21 kecamatan (older subdistricts, current districts):

kewedanaan	kecamatan
Kutai Ulu	Long Apari; Long Bagun; Long Pahangai; Long Iram
Sendawar	Barong Tongkok; Melak
West Kutai	Muara Pahu; Damai; Tabang; Kota Bangun; Muara Muntai
Central Kutai	Tenggarong; Muara Kaman; Muara Ancalong; Muara Wahau
East Kutai	Anggana; Sanga-Sanga; Bontang; Sangkulirang; (Samarinda)
South Kutai	Samboja; Penajam; (Balikpapan)

The district names are not conterminous with the present regencies: East Kutai Regency does not include Sanga-Sanga nor Anggana, while the district of the same name did not include Muara Wahau and Muara Ancalong. The subdistrict of Muara Sabintulung was once included as part of historical Central Kutai on the 1979 book Dari Swapraja ke Kabupaten Kutai, however, it is spurious since Sabintulung itself is a village within Muara Kaman, not a separate district.

== Re-establishment demands ==
In April 2025, chairman of the Hasanuddin University Alumni Association of East Kalimantan, Isradi Zainal, demanded the creation of a new province, named as Kutai, from parts of East Kalimantan.

== See also ==
- Kutai, a historical region
- Special Region of Surakarta, special region that was similarly abolished in the past
- Special Region of Yogyakarta, the only existing (first-level) special region led by two monarchs
