= Kutai Kartanegara Regency =

Regency in East Kalimantan, Indonesia

Kutai Kartanegara Regency Kabupaten Kutai Kartanegara
- Regency
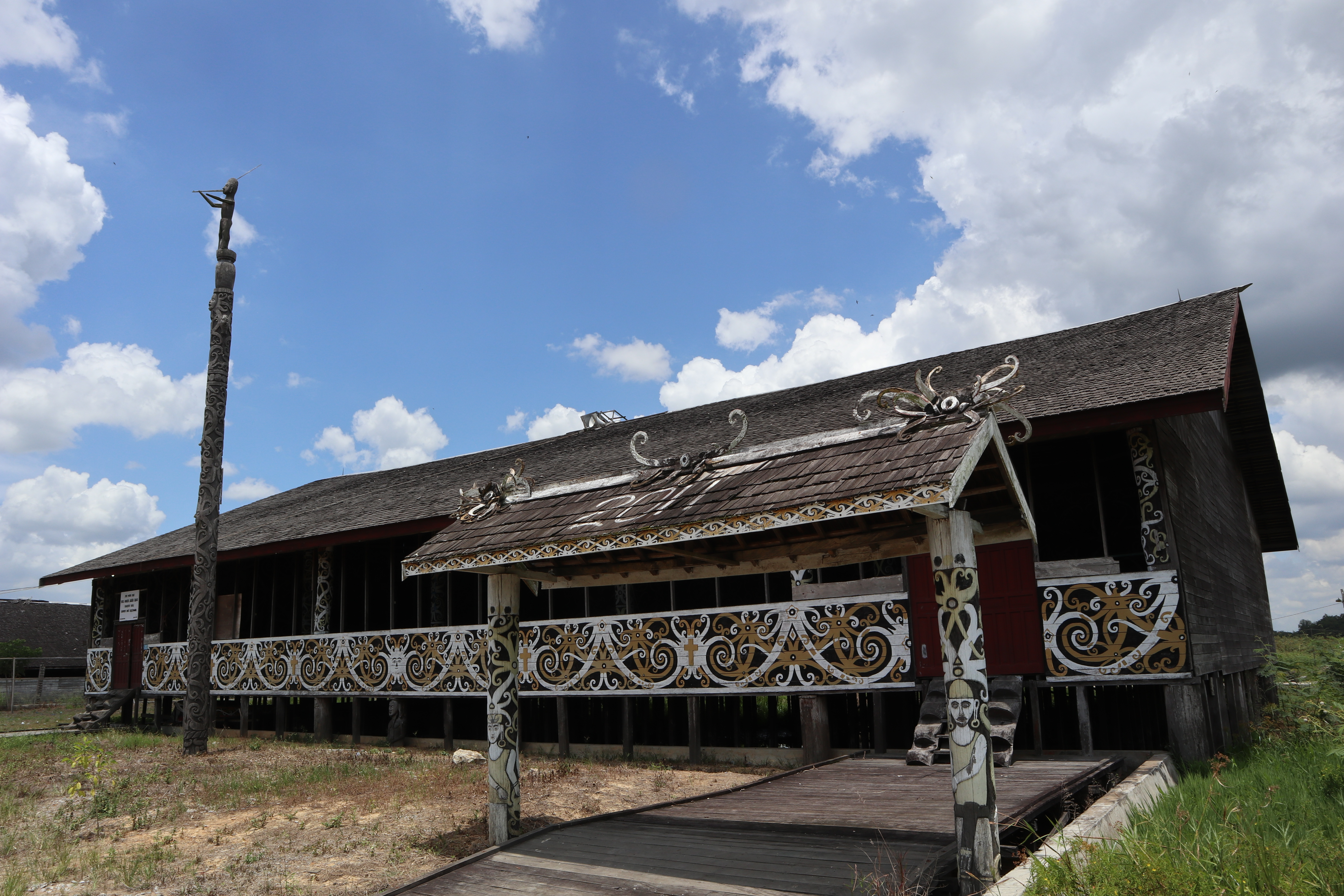
- A traditional Dayak house (Lamin) in Kutai Kartanegara

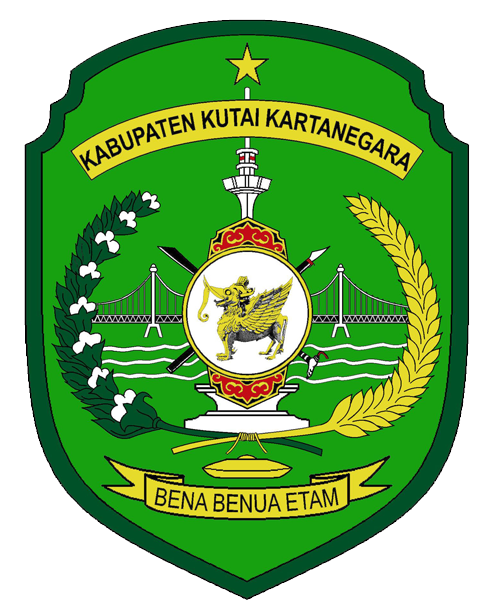
- Coat of arms
- Motto(s): Bena Benua Etam (Kutai) (Care About Our Region)
- Location within East Kalimantan

- Location in Kalimantan and Indonesia Kutai Kartanegara Regency (Indonesia)
- Coordinates: 0.44019°S 116.98139°E
- Country: Indonesia
- Province: East Kalimantan
- Capital: Tenggarong

Government
  - Regent: Aulia Rahman Basri
  - Vice Regent: Rendi Solihin

Area
  - Total: 27,891.13 km^{2} (10,768.83 sq mi)

Population (mid 2025 estimate)
  - Total: 845,621
  - Density: 30.3186/km^{2} (78.5249/sq mi)
- Time zone: UTC+8 (ICST)
- Area code: (+62) 541
- Website: kukarkab.go.id

Kutai Kartanegara Regency (Indonesian: Kabupaten Kutai Kartanegara, pronounced [kabuˌpat̪ɛn ˌkut̪ai̯ kart̪anəˈɡara]; abbreviated as Kukar), previously known as the Kutai Regency until 2002, is a regency of East Kalimantan Province, Indonesia. It has a land area of 27,891.13 km^{2} and a water area of 4,097 km^{2}, geographically located between 1°18′40″S and 116°31′36″E. The population of the regency was 626,286 at the 2010 Census and 729,382 at the 2020 Census; the official estimate as of mid-2025 was 845,621. The town of Tenggarong is the capital of the regency.

The regency includes the middle and lower reaches of the Mahakam River, the longest river in East Kalimantan, including its extensive delta. The city of Samarinda is situated on the river, about 48 km (30 miles) from its mouth; it is an administrative enclave within the regency, which thus contains much of the metropolitan area of Samarinda.

In 2019, President Joko Widodo proclaimed that the new national capital of Indonesia would be built in an area partly in the Kutai Kartanegara Regency and partly in the adjacent Penajam North Paser Regency and that the construction process would set off around 2024.

== History ==
Kutai Kartanegara Regency lies in the historical region of Kutai, home to the first and oldest Hindu kingdom of Indonesia, the Kutai Martadipura Kingdom founded in the 4th century CE by King Kudungga.

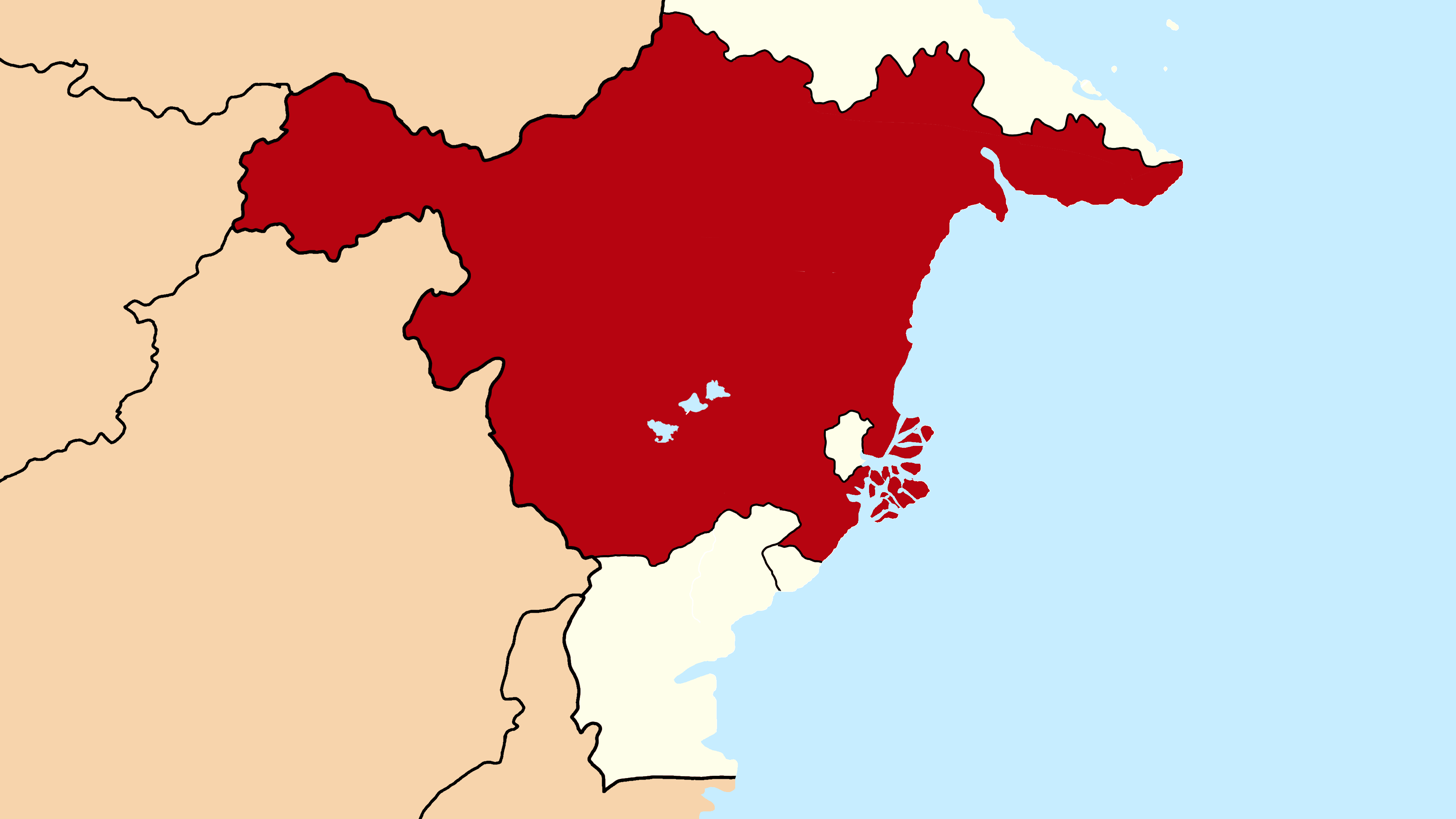
The second-largest extent of Kutai Regency, between 1987 and 1999

Between 3 January 1953 until 21 January 1960, this area was known as the Special Region of Kutai, the last political iteration of the Sultanate of Kutai. Following its dissolution (de jure on 26 June 1959), it was subsequently split into three entities: Balikpapan, Samarinda, and its remainder, known as the Kutai Regency. Since then, it has been governed by civilian officials instead of the sultanate family. Kutai remained the largest regency by area in its province and additionally shared an international border with the Kapit Division (Sarawak, Malaysia) until 4 October 1999; when the regencies of East Kutai, West Kutai, and Bontang city were formed out of the regency.

On 23 March 2002, it was officially renamed to its present name, the Kutai Kartanegara Regency, following the release of a decree regarding that matter by the Regional House of Representatives (DPRD) of Kutai Regency on 26 June 2001.

== Administrative districts ==
Kutai Kartanegara Regency is divided into twenty districts (kecamatan), tabulated below with their areas and their populations at the 2010 Census and 2020 Census, together with the official estimates as at mid-2025. The newly formed Kota Bangun Darat and Samboja Barat districts were split from Kota Bangun and Samboja districts respectively on 5 March 2021.

The table also includes the locations of the district administrative centres, the number of villages in each district (totaling 44 urban kelurahan and 193 rural desa), and its postcode(s).

Regional code	District name	Area (km^{2})	Population			Administrative centre	Number of villages		Post code(s)
Regional code	District name	Area (km^{2})	2010 Census	2020 Census	2025 Estimate	Administrative centre	Rural	Urban	Post code(s)
64.02.13	Samboja	284.93	54,515	66,617	45,436	Kampung Lama	3	10	75271, 76276, 75277, 75279
64.02.20	Samboja Barat (West Samboja)	416.46	^{(a)}	^{(a)}	33,515	Tani Bhakti	1	9	75271 - 75274
64.02.14	Muara Jawa ^{(b)}	615.76	33,923	41,561	49,317	Muara Jawa Ulu		8	75261 - 75267
64.02.15	Sanga Sanga	105.38	17,588	19,728	22,431	Sanga Sanga Dalam		5	75251 - 75256
64.02.03	Loa Janan	699.04	56,071	67,471	79,369	Loa Janan Ulu	8		75391
64.02.02	Loa Kulu ^{(c)}	1,614.96	39,938	51,639	62,894	Loh Sumber	15		75571
64.02.01	Muara Muntai ^{(d)}	946.43	17,315	19,396	22,039	Muara Muntai Ilir	13		75562
64.02.18	Muara Wis	1,315.78	8,557	9,398	10,577	Muara Wis	7		75559
64.02.08	Kota Bangun	440.35	31,292	36,655	27,178	Kota Bangun Ulu	11		75561
64.02.19	Kota Bangun Darat	459.90	^{(e)}	^{(e)}	15,384	Kedang Ipil	10		75561
64.02.06	Tenggarong ^{(f)}	358.34	96,209	106,480	120,287	Melayu	2	12	75511 - 75517
64.02.07	Sebulu	599.70	36,420	40,925	46,573	Sebulu Ilir	14		75552
64.02.16	Tenggarong Seberang ^{(g)}	656.76	61,441	67,877	76,612	Manunggal Jaya	18		75572
64.02.04	Anggana ^{(h)}	1,882.21	32,688	33,416	36,326	Sungai Meriam	8		75381 ^{(i)}
64.02.05	Muara Badak ^{(j)}	783.18	39,834	46,656	54,171	Muara Badak Ulu	13		75382
64.02.17	Marang Kayu	866.07	23,394	26,823	30,864	Sebuntal	11		75385
64.02.11	Muara Kaman	4,235.47	33,909	45,885	57,131	Muara Kaman Ulu	20		75553
64.02.09	Kenohan	1,308.47	9,861	11,588	13,476	Kahala	9		75564
64.02.10	Kembang Janggut	2,195.25	23,817	25,810	28,861	Kembang Janggut	11		75557
64.02.12	Tabang	8,106.71	9,908	11,457	13,220	Sidomulyo	19		75558
	Totals	27,891.13	626,286	729,382	845,621	Tenggarong	237		

Notes: (a) included in the figures for Samboja District, from which it was split off in 2021.
(b) including 13 offshore islands in the southern part of the delta of the Mahakam River.
(c) includes the offshore island of Pulau Jerang. (d) includes the offshore island of Pulau Harapan.
(e) included in the figures for Kota Bangun District, from which it was split off in 2021.
(f) including the riverine island of Pulau Kumala in the Mahakam River (linked to Tenggarong town by a footbridge).
(g) including the riverine island of Pulau Yupa in the Mahakam River.
(h) including 32 offshore islands, and mainly comprising the largest (central) part of the extensive delta of the Mahakam River.
(i) except the desa of Sidomulyo, which has a postcode of 76131.
(j) including the 6 offshore islands of Pulau Barau, Pulau Berukang, Pulau Jopang, Pulau Lantang Kecil, Pulau Lerong and Pulau Letung in the northern part of the delta of the Mahakam River.

== Geography ==
=== Lakes ===
The Regency includes some 16 notable lakes drained by the Mahakam River, of which the largest are Lake Jempang (Danau Jempang, with a surface area of 124.36 km^{2}), Lake Semayang (Danau Semayang, 104.56 km^{2}) and Lake Melintang (Danau Melintang, 87.96 km^{2}).

=== Bukit Bangkirai rainforest ===
Bukit Bangkirai (Bangkirai Hill) is a 1,500-hectare natural tropical located about 58 kilometres (around 45 minutes by car) from the city of Balikpapan. Plants of the family Dipterocarpaceae dominate in the area, especially Bangkirai trees (Shorea laevis of the genus Shorea) growing to 40–50 metres in height. There are over 120 bird species as well as gibbons (Müller's Bornean gibbon), macaque monkeys (Southern pig-tailed macaques, Crab-eating macaques), Maroon leaf monkeys, Banded pigs, and Banggai crows. Black Orchids (Coelogyne pandurata), among 45 kinds of orchids, are endemic to Bukit Bangkirai.

To visit the forest, visitors can walk along a 64-metre canopy bridge that connects five big Bangkirai trees 30 metres above the ground.

== Places of interest ==
=== Mangrove information, research center ===
In 2011, East Kalimantan province developed an 18-hectare plot of land for mangrove information and research center in Sepatin village, in Anggana District, as Bali has done. It will function as a research, exhibition, information, breeding as well as education center on mangroves, especially in the Mahakam Delta.

=== Smart city ===
In early 2015 it was announced that part of Kutai Kartanegara Regency had been selected to be a trial 'smart city', the first in Indonesia, based on the Fujisawa Sustainable Smart Town (SST) concept. The aim of the SST concept was to reduce CO_{2} emissions by 70 percent and reduce consumption of water by 30 percent. The Kutai Kartanegara area was chosen as a trial area because of good investment growth in the region, the extensive area, relatively moderate levels of population density, effective planning in the area, and rich energy resources.

== See also ==
- Kutai, (historical region in eastern Borneo)
- Kutainese language
- Legend of the Centipede Lake
