= Marang Kayu =

District of Kutai Kartanegara Regency, East Kalimantan

- District
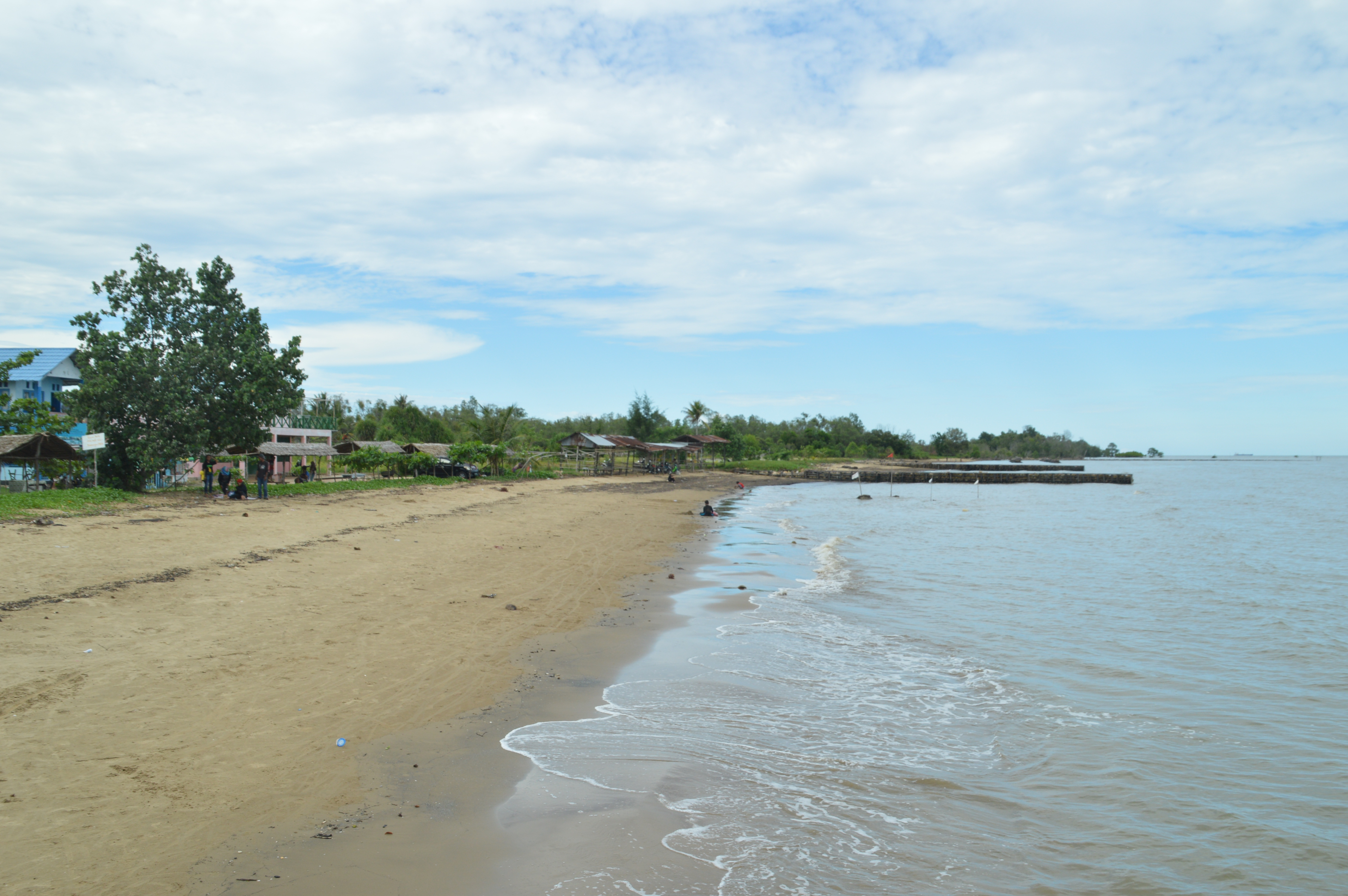
- Blue Beach of Kersik
- Interactive map of Marang Kayu
- Location Marang Kayu (Indonesia)
- Coordinates: 0°6′45.86335″S 117°25′49.88240″E
- Country: Indonesia
- Province: East Kalimantan
- Regency: Kutai Kartanegara
- Established: 11 June 1996
- District seat: Sebuntal

Government
  - District head (Camat): Ambo Dalle

Area
  - Total: 866.20 km^{2} (334.44 sq mi)

Population (mid 2024)
  - Total: 30,223
  - Density: 34.891/km^{2} (90.369/sq mi)
- Time zone: UTC+8 (ICT)
- Regional code: 64.02.17
- Villages: 14

Marang Kayu (Indonesian pronunciation: [ˈmaraŋ ˈkaju]) is the most northern of the coastal districts of Kutai Kartanegara Regency, East Kalimantan, Indonesia. It covers a land area of 866.20 km^{2} and, as at mid 2024, it was inhabited by 30,223 people. Its district seat is located at the coastal village of Sebuntal.

Marang Kayu District borders South Bontang District (of the city of Bontang) to the northeast, Teluk Pandan District (of East Kutai Regency) to the northwest, Muara Kamam District to the west, the districts of Sebulu, Tenggarong Seberang and Muara Badak to the south, and the Makassar Strait to the east. The district was formed on 11 June 1996 from the northern parts of Muara Badak District, and it initially consisted of five villages: Sebuntal, Kersik, Santan Ulu, Santan Tengah, and Santan Ilir (three of them were transferred from the outgoing district of Bontang in 1989).

== Governance ==
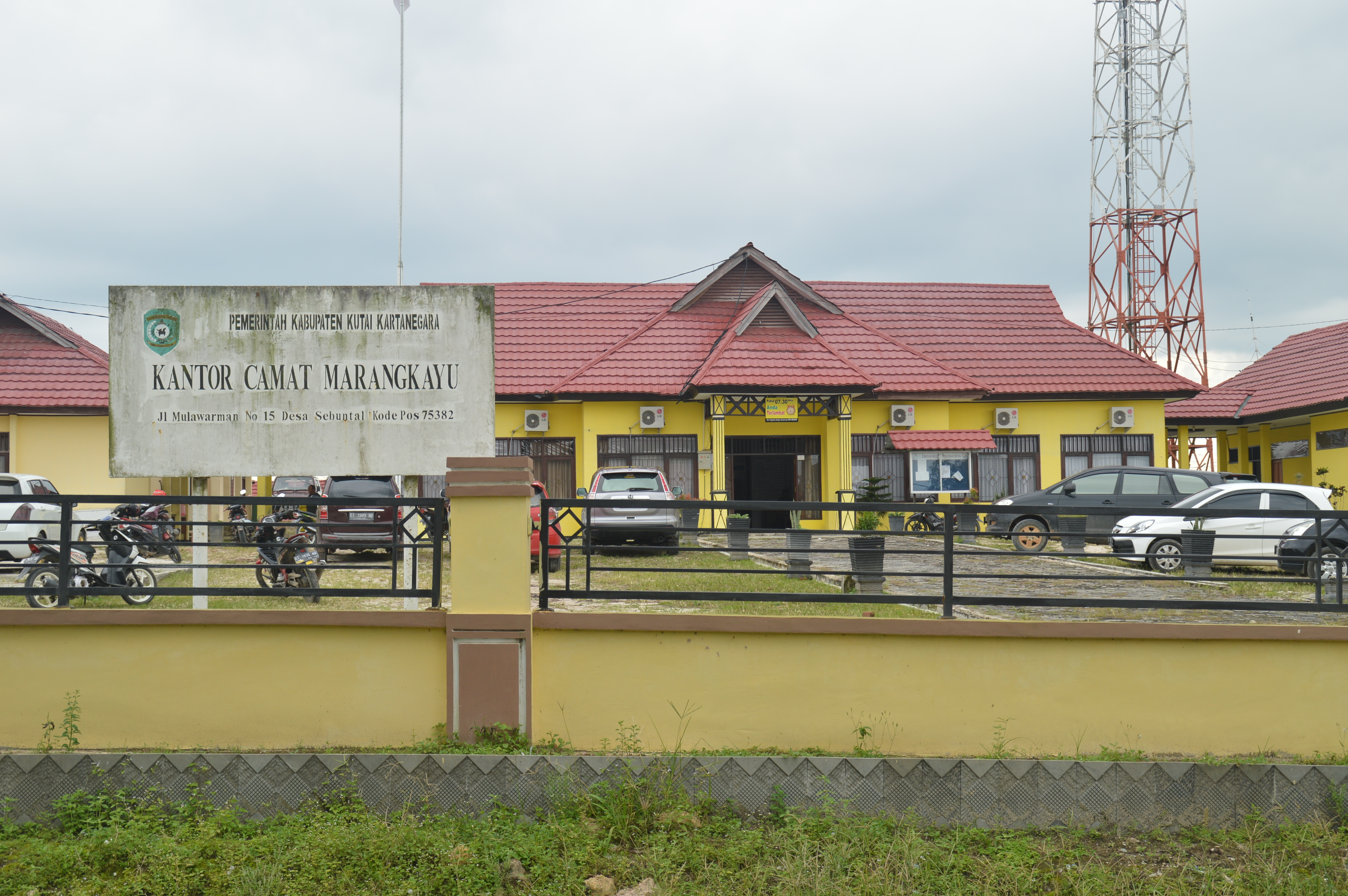
District head office at Sebuntal, Marang Kayu.

=== Villages ===
Marang Kayu District is divided into the following eleven rural villages (rated as desa), listed with their areas and their populations as at mid 2024, while the district seat is marked bold:

Regional code (Kode wilayah)	Name	Area (km^{2})	Pop'n (2024)	Hamlets (dusun)	RT (rukun tetangga)
64.02.17.2001	Perangat Baru	35.81	1,118	2	10
64.02.17.2002	Bunga Putih	21.06	1,715	4	12
64.02.17.2003	South Perangat (Perangat Selatan)	40.14	2,038	3	16
64.02.17.2004	Makarti	58.35	2,457	3	15
64.02.17.2005	**Sebuntal**	120.01	6,234	9	30
64.02.17.2006	Kersik	4.21	1,149	2	4
64.02.17.2007	Santan Ilir	28.58	2,189	5	12
64.02.17.2008	Central Santan (Santan Tengah)	36.26	2,540	4	13
64.02.17.2009	Santan Ulu	421.96	4,840	6	20
64.02.17.2010	Sambera Baru	26.67	1,655	3	16
64.02.17.2011	Semangko	73.16	4,288	5	13
	Totals	866.20	30,223	46	161
