= Tenggarong Seberang =

District of Kutai Kartanegara Regency, East Kalimantan

- District
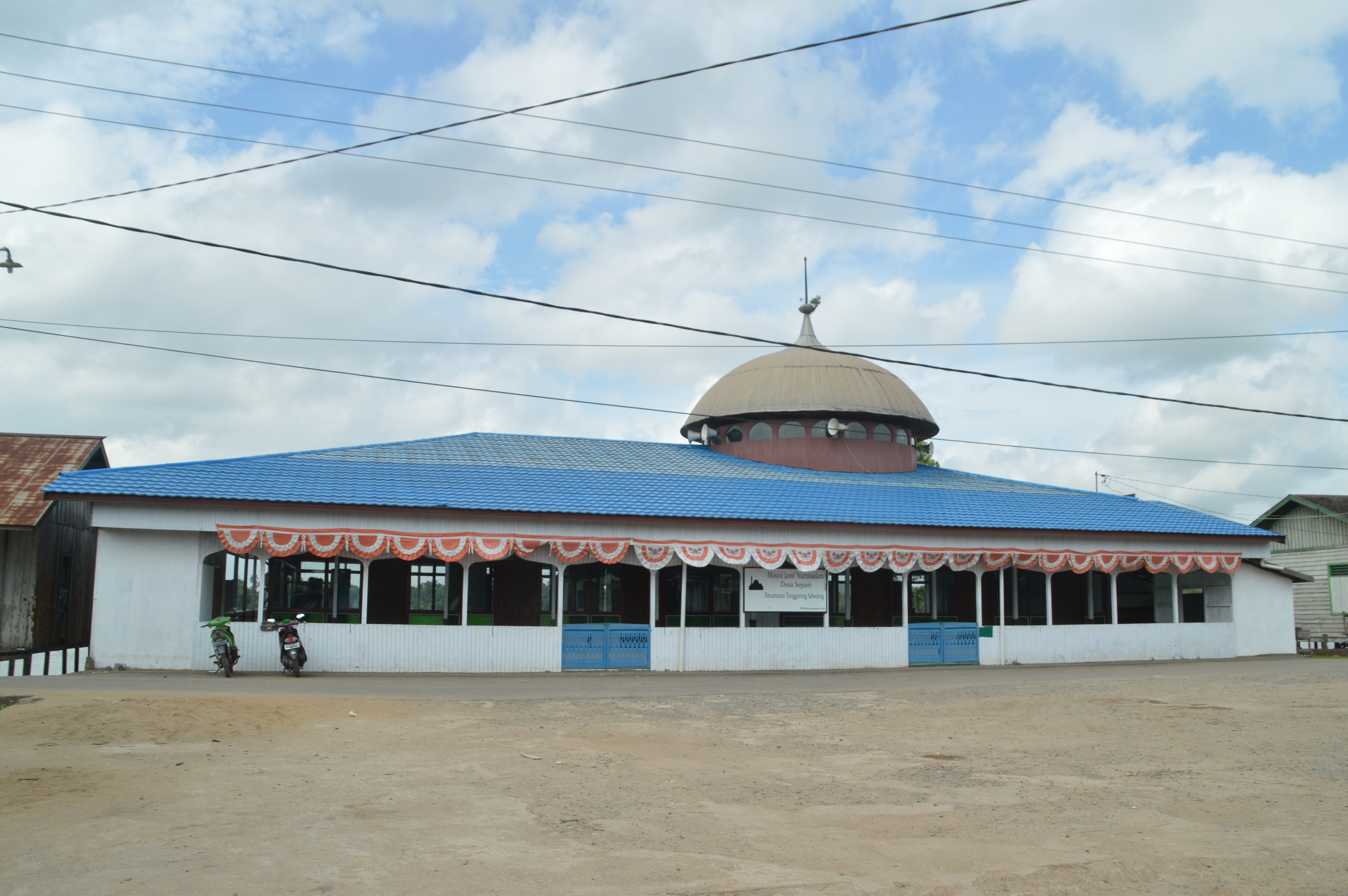
- Jami Mosque of Nurussalam, Separi
- Interactive map of Tenggarong Seberang
- Location in Kalimantan and Indonesia Tenggarong Seberang (Indonesia)
- Coordinates: 0°22′47.70858″S 117°6′45.36918″E
- Country: Indonesia
- Province: East Kalimantan
- Regency: Kutai Kartanegara Regency
- Established: 11 June 1996

Government
  - District head (Camat): Tego Yuwono

Area
  - Total: 443.40 km^{2} (171.20 sq mi)

Population (mid 2025)
  - Total: 74,667
  - Density: 168.40/km^{2} (436.14/sq mi)
- Time zone: UTC+8 (ICT)
- Regional code: 64.02.16
- Villages: 18

Tenggarong Seberang (Indonesian pronunciation: [t̪əŋˌɡarɔŋ səbəˈraŋ], lit. 'opposite of Tenggarong') is a district of the Kutai Kartanegara Regency, East Kalimantan, Indonesia. As of mid 2025, it was inhabited by 74,667 people, and currently has a total area of 443.40 km^{2}. Its district seat is located at the village of Manunggal Jaya.

The district was formed on 11 June 1996 from those parts of Tenggarong District on the east bank of the Mahakam River, and it initially consisted of fourteen administrative villages (desa). It is located halfway between the mainland of Tenggarong and the provincial capital of Samarinda.

== Governance ==
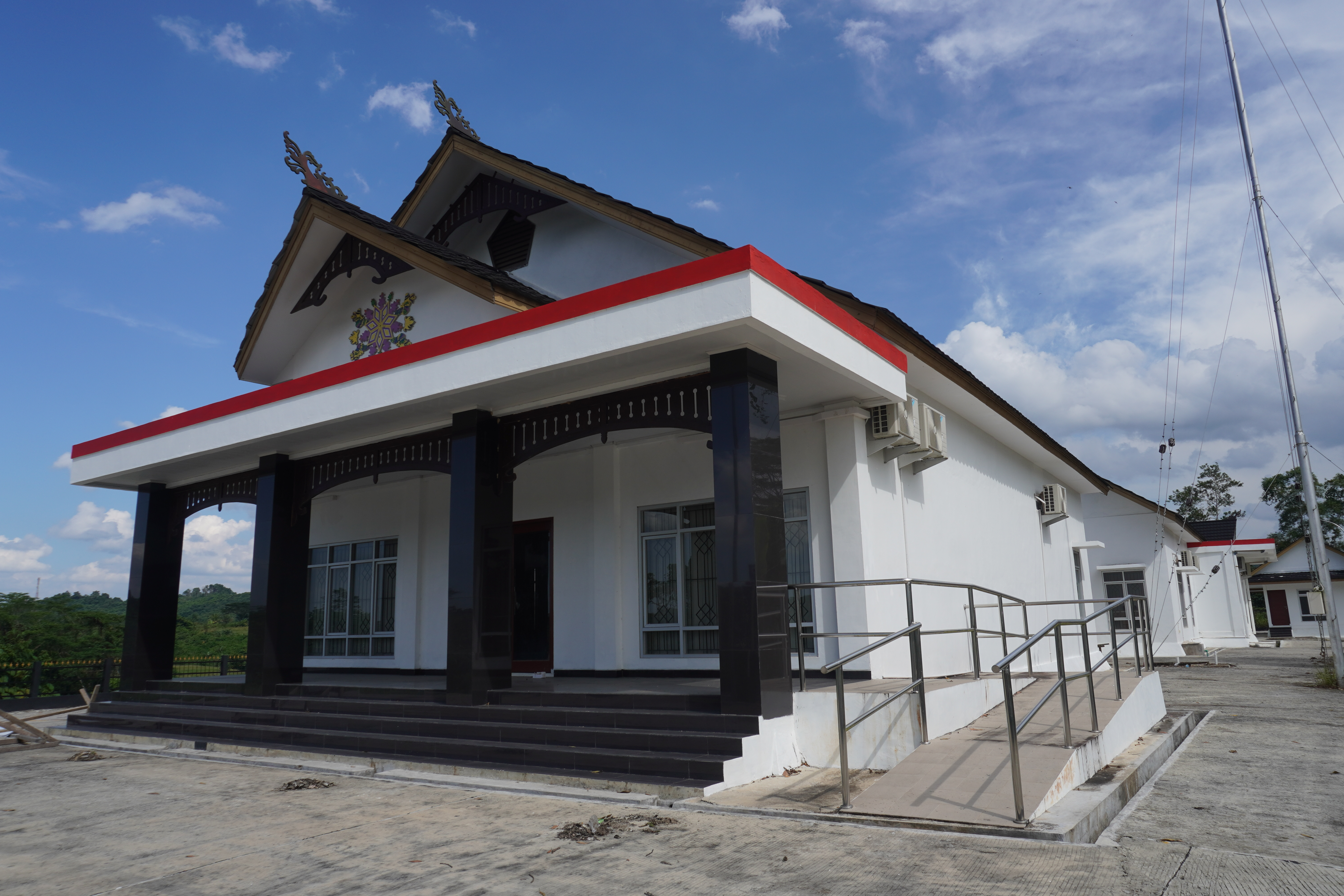
District head office at Manunggal Jaya, Tenggarong Seberang.

=== Villages ===
Tenggarong Seberang is divided into the following eighteen villages (desa), listed below with their areas and populations as at mid 2023, while the district seat is marked bold:

Regional code (Kode wilayah)	Name	Area (km^{2})	Pop'n (2023)	RT (rukun tetangga)
64.02.16.2001	**Manunggal Jaya**	15.0	7,795	25
64.02.16.2002	Bukit Raya	10.1	5,308	20
64.02.16.2003	Embalut	25.0	2,723	8
64.02.16.2004	Bangun Rejo	21.9	11,081	34
64.02.16.2005	Kerta Buana	20.1	5,663	26
64.02.16.2006	Separi	6.4	4,671	20
64.02.16.2007	Bukit Pariaman	42.1	8,654	38
64.02.16.2008	Bhuana Jaya	37.0	4,857	25
64.02.16.2009	Mulawarman	24.7	2,623	19
64.02.16.2010	Loa Ulung	12.0	2,041	10
64.02.16.2011	Loa Raya	15.5	1,467	5
64.02.16.2012	Perjiwa	11.8	2,032	5
64.02.16.2013	Teluk Dalam	40.0	2,120	4
64.02.16.2014	Loa Lepu	11.7	1,182	6
64.02.16.2015	Sukamaju	41.0	2,412	16
64.02.16.2016	Loa Pari	13.0	1,851	7
64.02.16.2017	Karang Tunggal	13.0	1,352	17
64.02.16.2018	Tanjung Batu	13.5	4,528	9
	Totals	443.4	73,060	294
