= Tenggarong =

- District
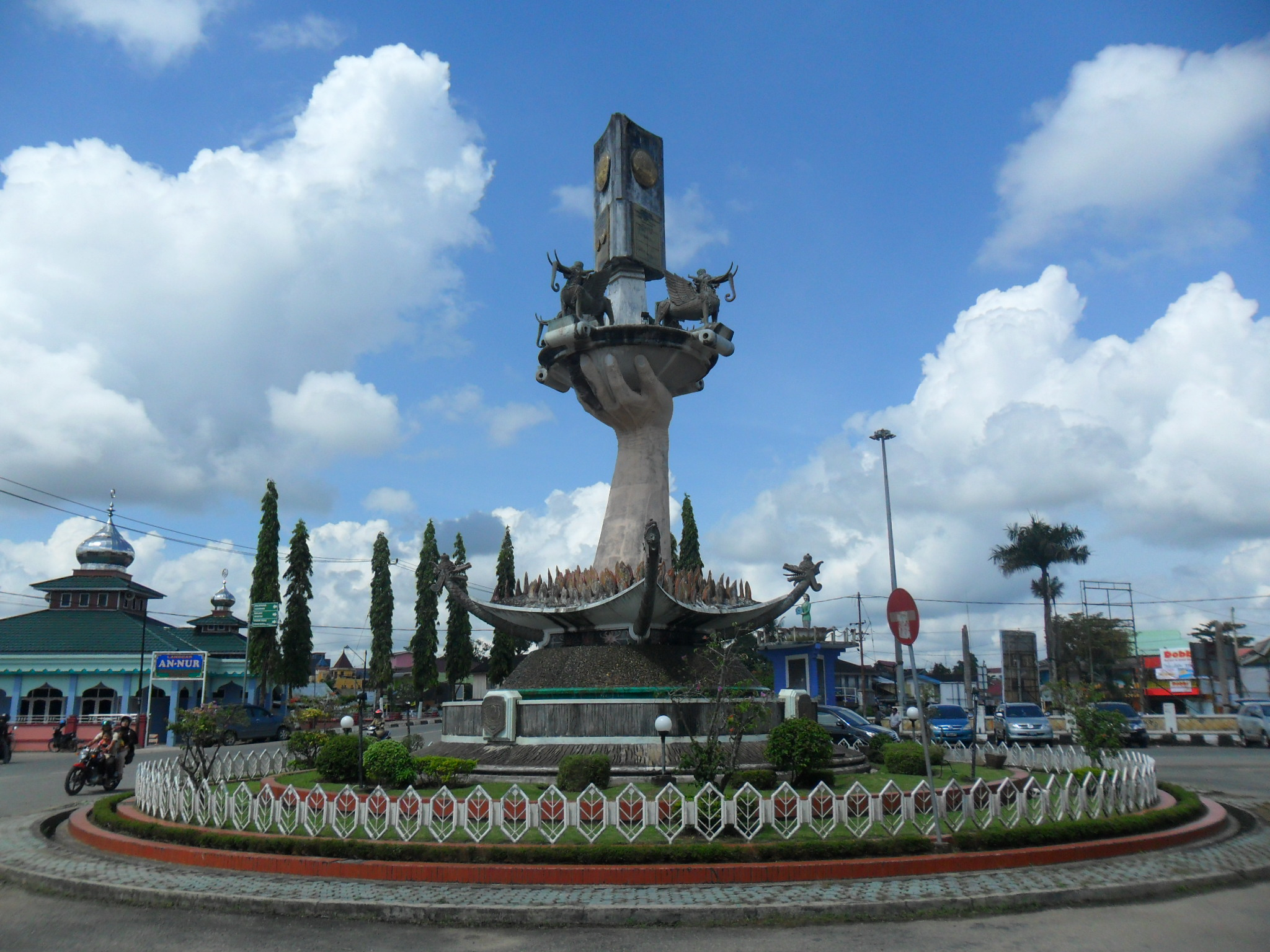
- Adipura Monument at Tenggarong

- Location in East Kalimantan, Kalimantan, and Indonesia Tenggarong (Kalimantan) Tenggarong (Indonesia)
- Coordinates: 0°24′S 116°58′E
- Country: Indonesia
- Province: East Kalimantan
- Regency: Kutai Kartanegara

Government
  - District head: Sukono

Area
  - Total: 358.34 km^{2} (138.36 sq mi)

Population (mid 2025 estimate)
  - Total: 117,308
  - Density: 327.37/km^{2} (847.87/sq mi)
- Time zone: UTC+8 (ICT)
- Villages: 14

Tenggarong (Indonesian pronunciation: [t̪əŋˈɡarɔŋ]), historically known as either Tepian Pandan or Tangga Arung, is a riverside administrative district (kecamatan) and the centre of Kutai Kartanegara Regency in the Indonesian province of East Kalimantan. The district is located on the west bank of the Mahakam River and covers an area of 358.34 km^{2}.following the administrative split when the east bank villages were split off to be formed into the new Tenggarong Seberang District in 1996. It is the most populous district in Kutai Kartanegara, with a population of 106,480 in the 2020 census, and an estimated 117,308 in 2025.

== History ==
The former Kutai Kartanegara Sultanate's capital was likewise located in Tenggarong. Historically, the then capital was called Tepian Pandan. At some point, the Kutai Kartanegara Sultan, Aji Muhammad Muslihuddin, changed the name from Tepian Pandan to Tangga Arung (literally the house of the king). In application, the people of Kutai would then shorten this name by combining the two words Tangga Arung to Tenggarong. It was alternatively spelt as Tengaron, especially in older publications.

Tenggarong became the capital of the Special Region of Kutai (and then Kutai Regency) in late 1956. Previously, Samarinda held this status from 1950 until 1956, three years before it became an autonomous city. In November 1964, following the release of a local decree, the western part of the district (which consisted of only one village, Sebulu) was separated from Tenggarong, together with parts of Muara Kaman, to form the new District of Sebulu (which was later inaugurated on 12 May 1965). On 11 June 1996, the eastern part of the remaining district, separated by the Mahakam river, was similarly separated from Tenggarong to form the new District of Tenggarong Seberang.

== Administration ==
=== Villages ===
Tenggarong is divided into the following fourteen villages (twelve urban kelurahan and two rural desa, the latter marked with a grey background):

Regional code (Kode wilayah)	Name	Area (km^{2})	Pop'n (2023)	RT (rukun tetangga)
64.02.06.1001	Jahab	161.57	4,851	22
64.02.06.1002	Loa Ipuh	67.38	26,048	77
64.02.06.1003	Bukit Biru	13.45	5,087	24
64.02.06.1004	Timbau	10.00	18,155	36
64.02.06.1005	Melayu	9.00	15,606	47
64.02.06.1006	Panji	13.70	6,061	19
64.02.06.1007	Sukarame	4.00	4,074	13
64.02.06.1008	Kampung Baru	7.00	6,290	18
64.02.06.1009	Loa Tebu	52.00	4,959	21
64.02.06.1010	Mangkurawang	20.00	9,127	20
64.02.06.1011	Maluhu	4.72	6,401	24
64.02.06.2012	Rapak Lambur	12.00	2,072	15
64.02.06.1013	Loa Ipuh Darat	20.00	3,946	14
64.02.06.2014	Bendang Raya	25.82	1,362	14
	Totals	358.34	114,039	364

== Demographics ==
Tenggarong had a population of 96,209 at the 2010 Census and 106,480 at the 2020 Census; the official estimate as at mid 2025 was 117,308. Its administrative headquarters is located at the urban village (kelurahan) of Timbau.

== Climate ==
Tenggarong has a tropical rainforest climate (Af) with heavy rainfall year-round.

Climate data for Tenggarong
Month	Jan	Feb	Mar	Apr	May	Jun	Jul	Aug	Sep	Oct	Nov	Dec	Year
Mean daily maximum °C (°F)	29.9 (85.8)	30.2 (86.4)	30.3 (86.5)	30.3 (86.5)	30.3 (86.5)	29.7 (85.5)	29.4 (84.9)	29.8 (85.6)	30.0 (86.0)	30.6 (87.1)	30.4 (86.7)	30.2 (86.4)	30.1 (86.2)
Daily mean °C (°F)	26.4 (79.5)	26.6 (79.9)	26.6 (79.9)	26.8 (80.2)	27.0 (80.6)	26.5 (79.7)	26.2 (79.2)	26.5 (79.7)	26.7 (80.1)	27.1 (80.8)	26.8 (80.2)	26.7 (80.1)	26.7 (80.0)
Mean daily minimum °C (°F)	23.0 (73.4)	23.0 (73.4)	23.0 (73.4)	23.3 (73.9)	23.7 (74.7)	23.4 (74.1)	23.0 (73.4)	23.3 (73.9)	23.4 (74.1)	23.6 (74.5)	23.3 (73.9)	23.2 (73.8)	23.3 (73.9)
Average rainfall mm (inches)	171 (6.7)	170 (6.7)	204 (8.0)	239 (9.4)	177 (7.0)	152 (6.0)	135 (5.3)	130 (5.1)	111 (4.4)	142 (5.6)	200 (7.9)	212 (8.3)	2,043 (80.4)
Source: Climate-Data.org

== Gallery ==
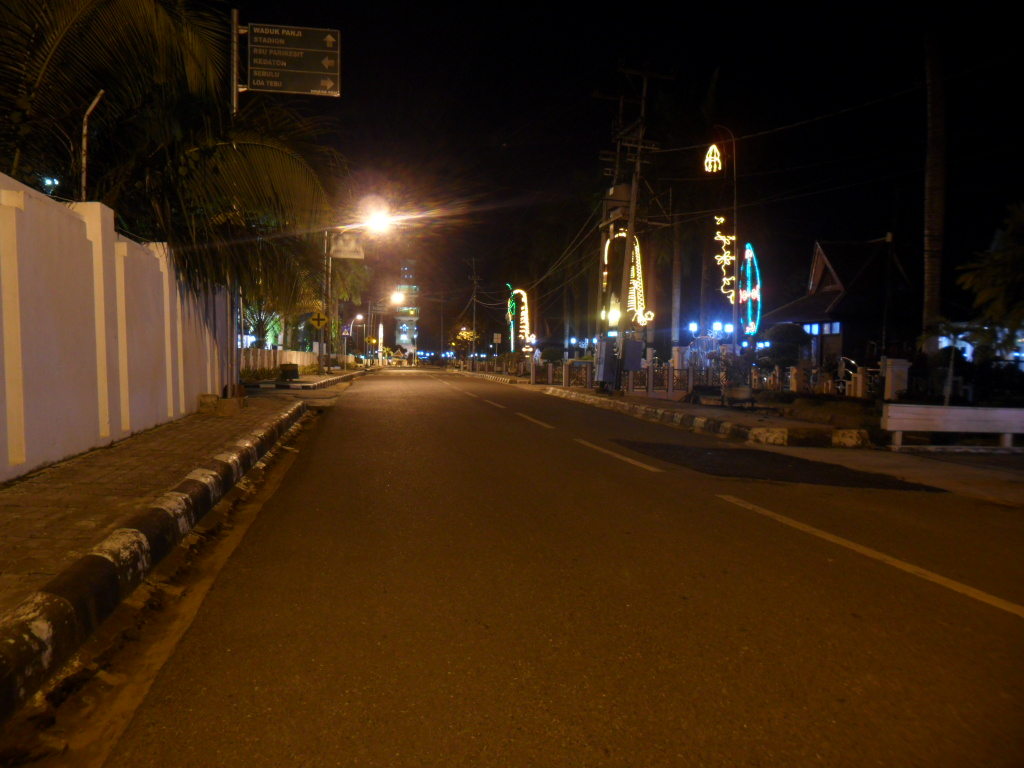
Jalanan kota Tenggarong pada malam hari.

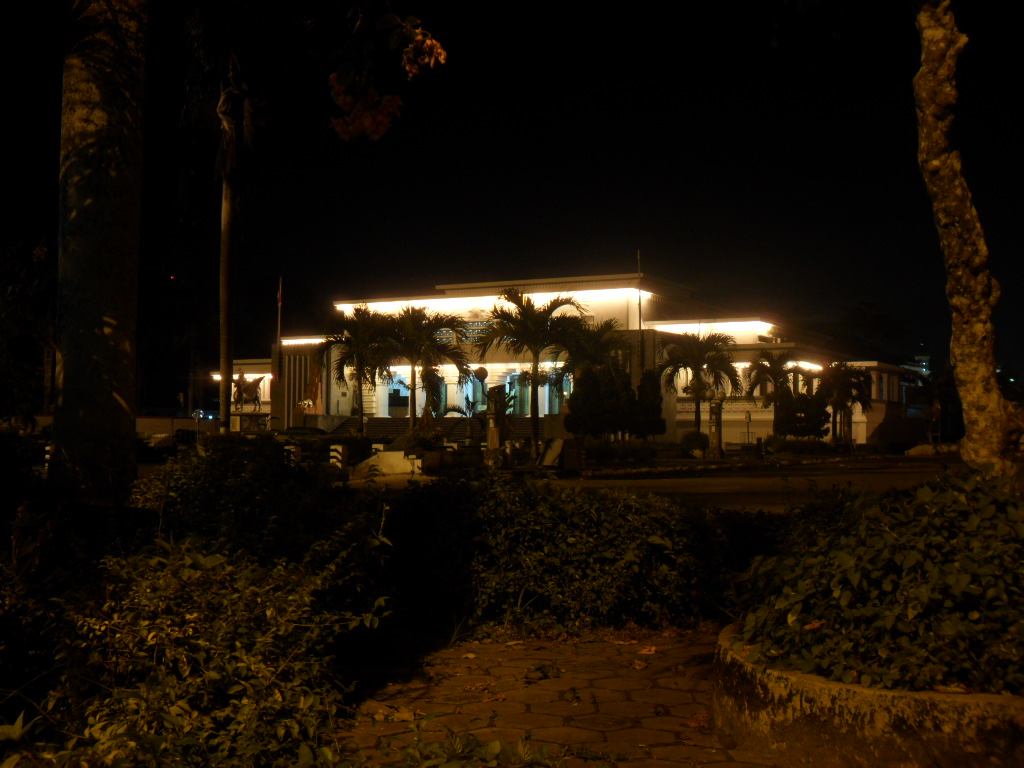
Museum Mulawarman

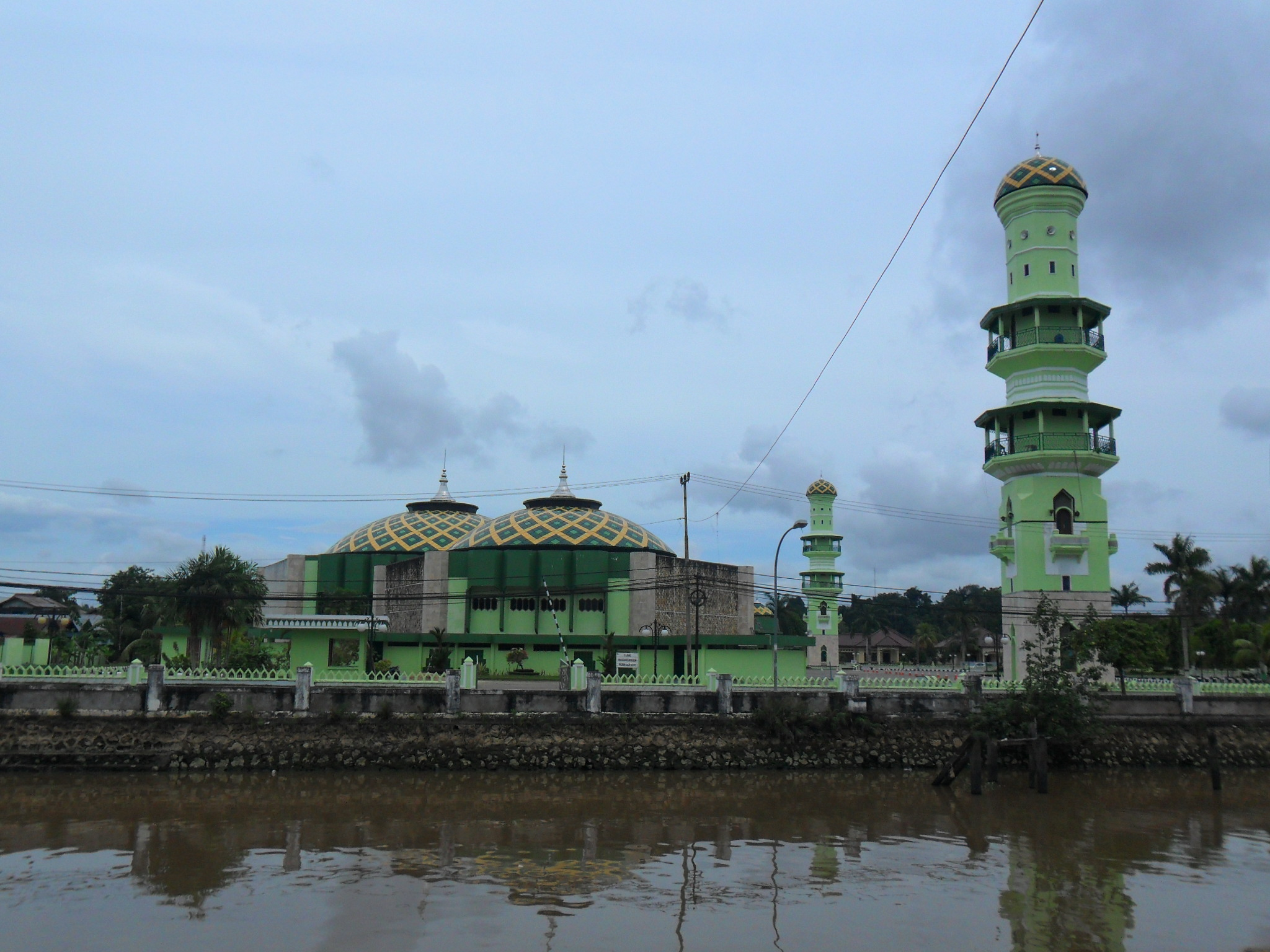
Masjid Jami Sultan Sulaiman.

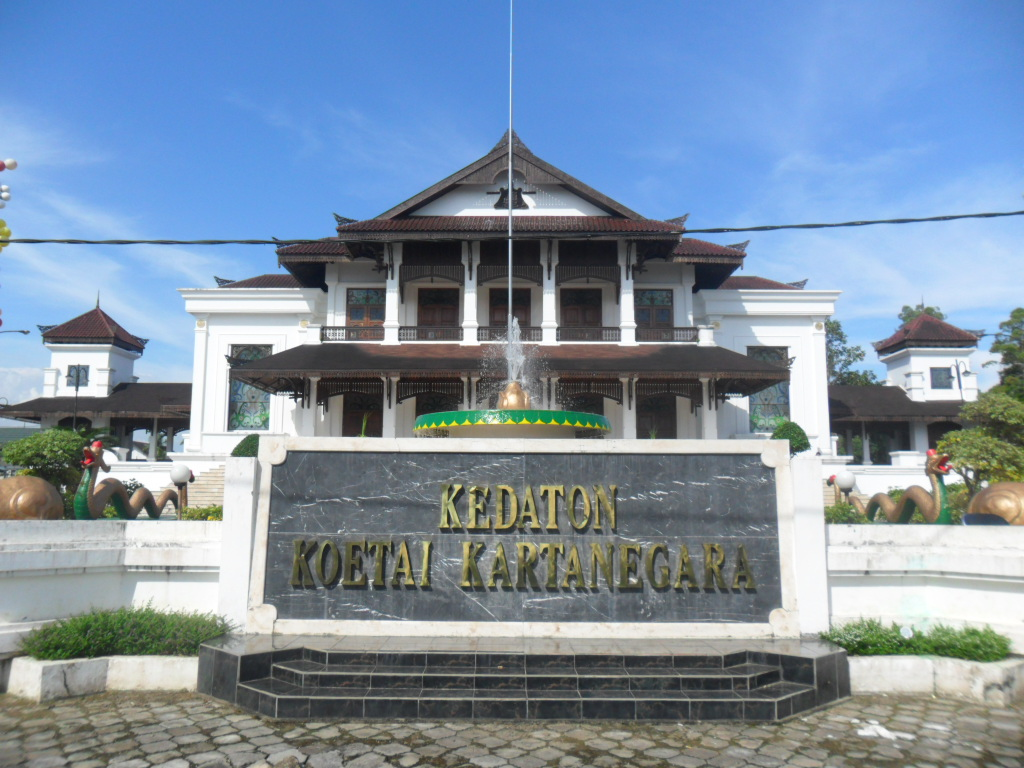
Kedaton Koetai Kartanegara.
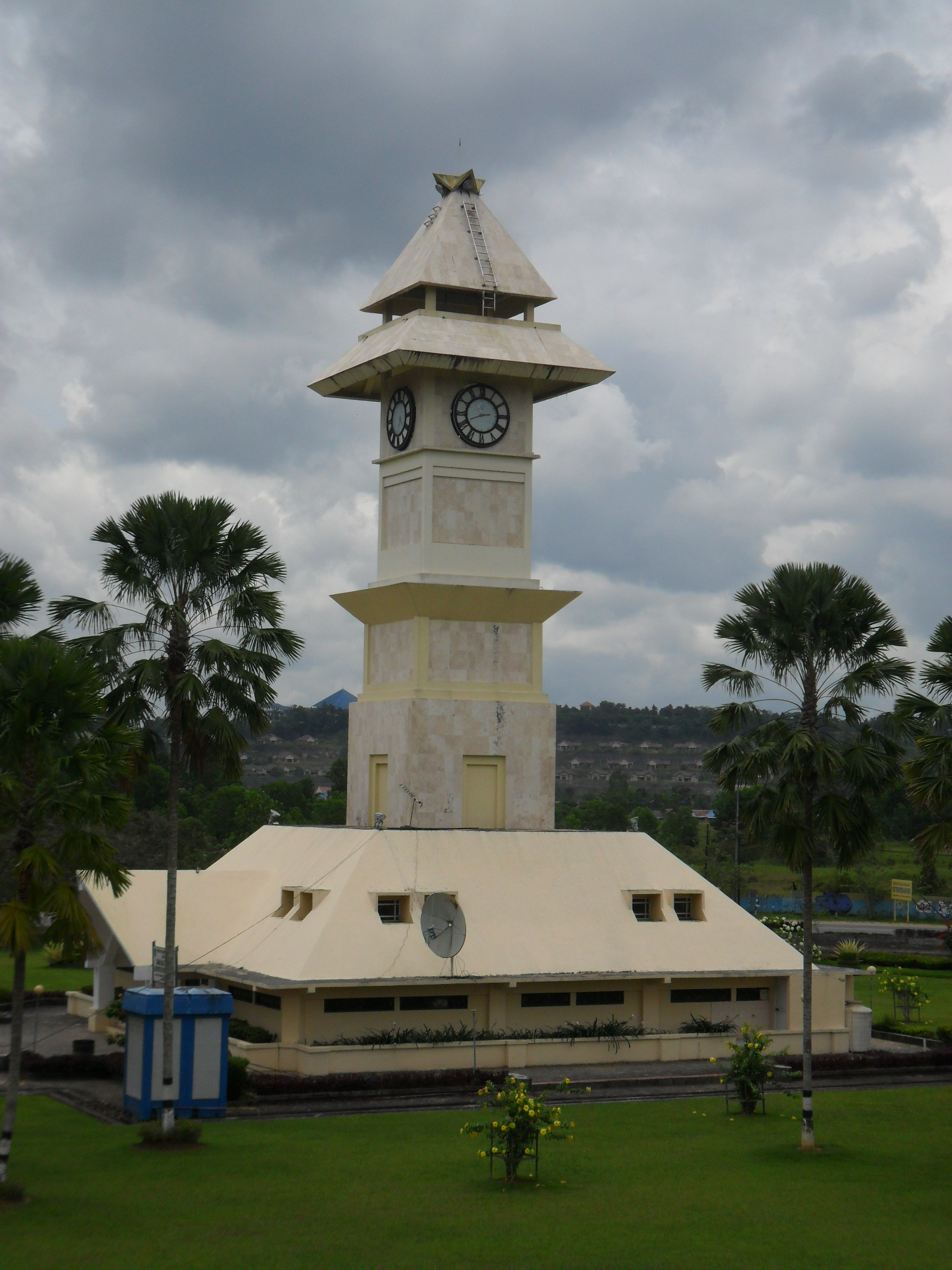
Bentong Clock

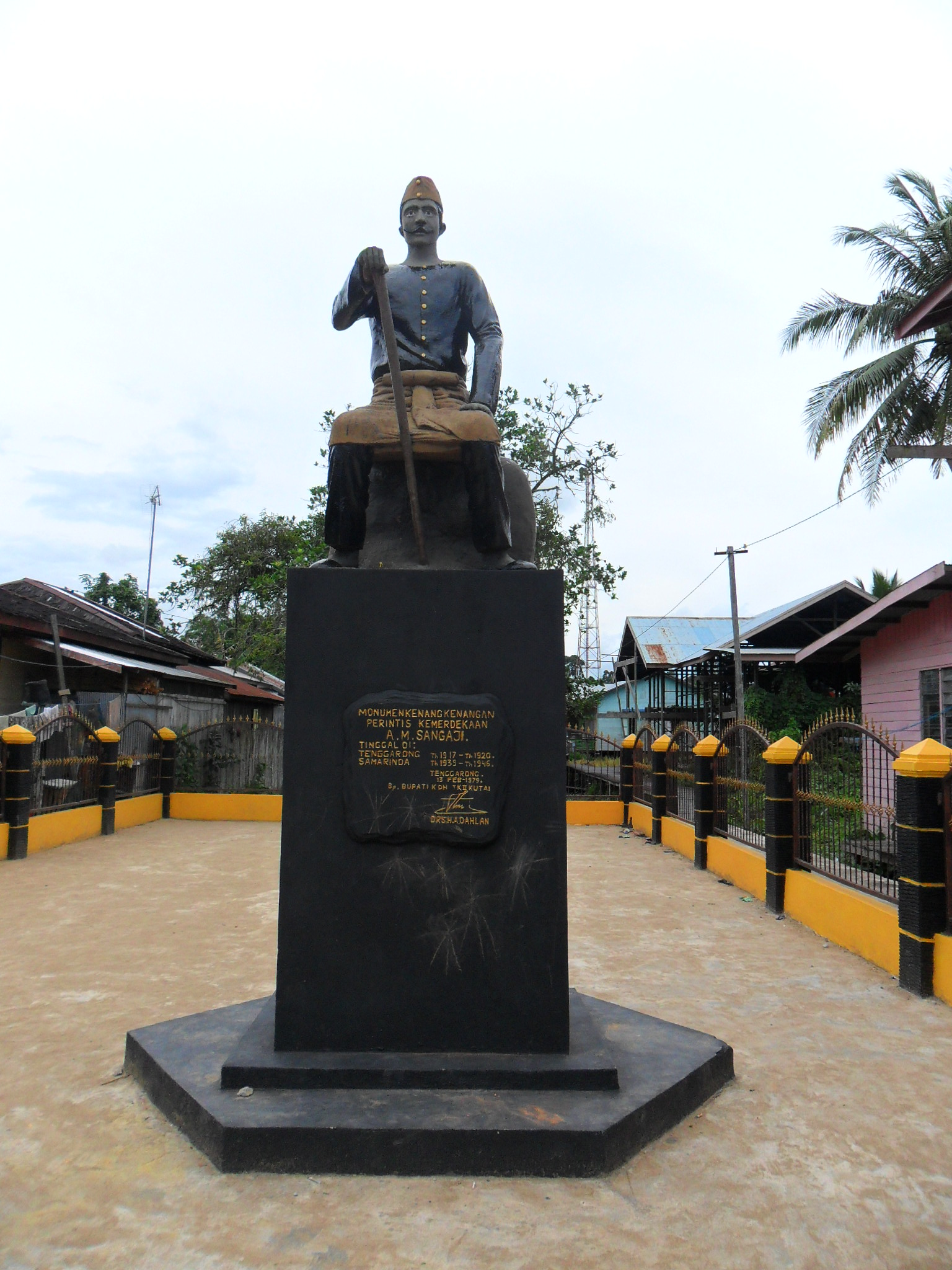
Monument to A.M. Sangaji

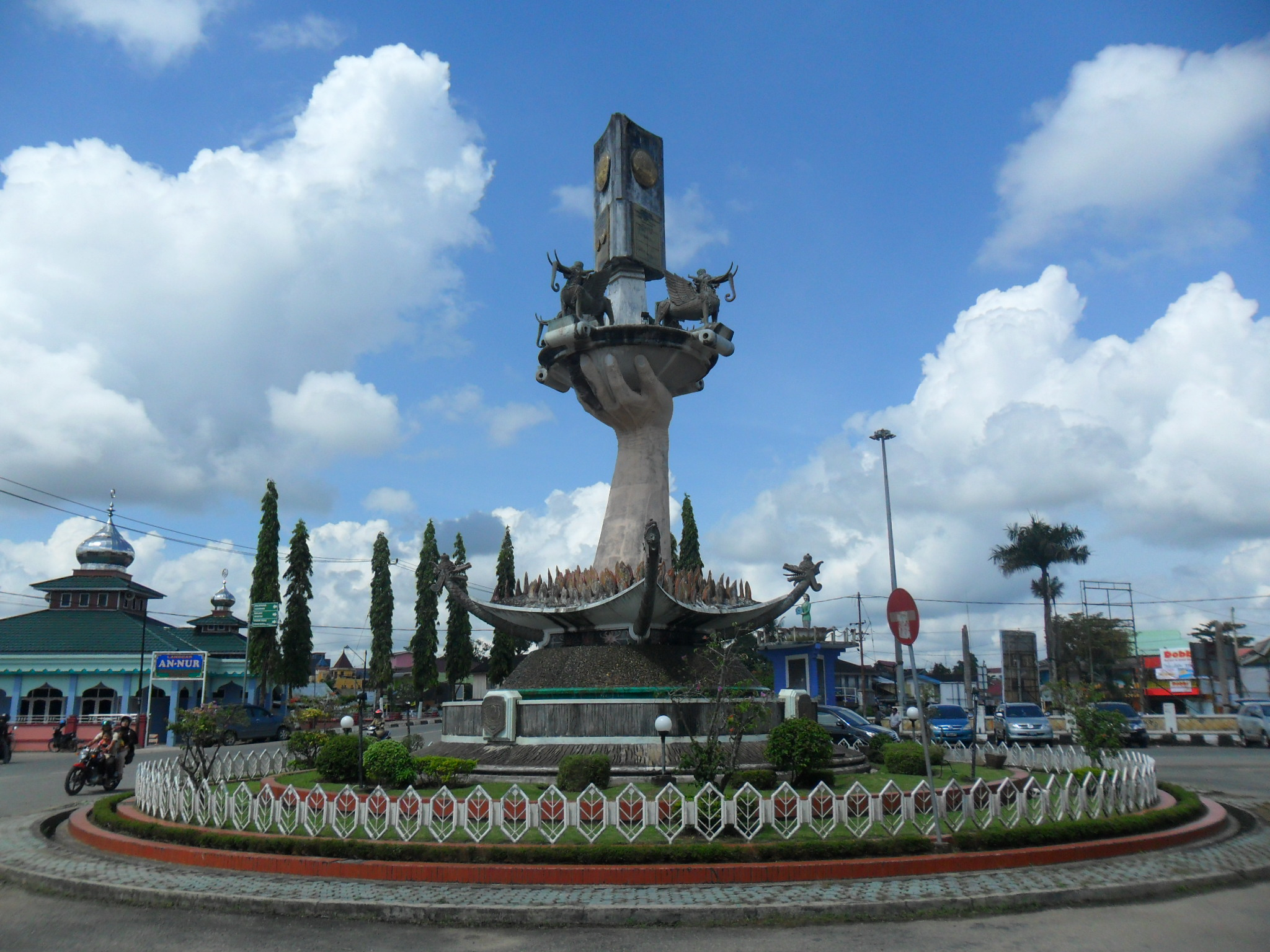
Adipura Monument

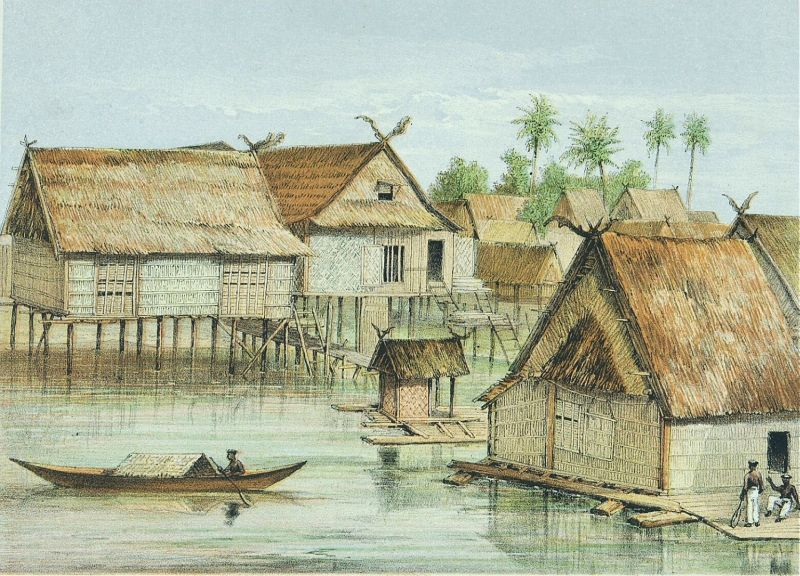
Lithography view at Tenggarong (1887).
