= Kota Bangun =

District of Kutai Kartanegara Regency, East Kalimantan

- District
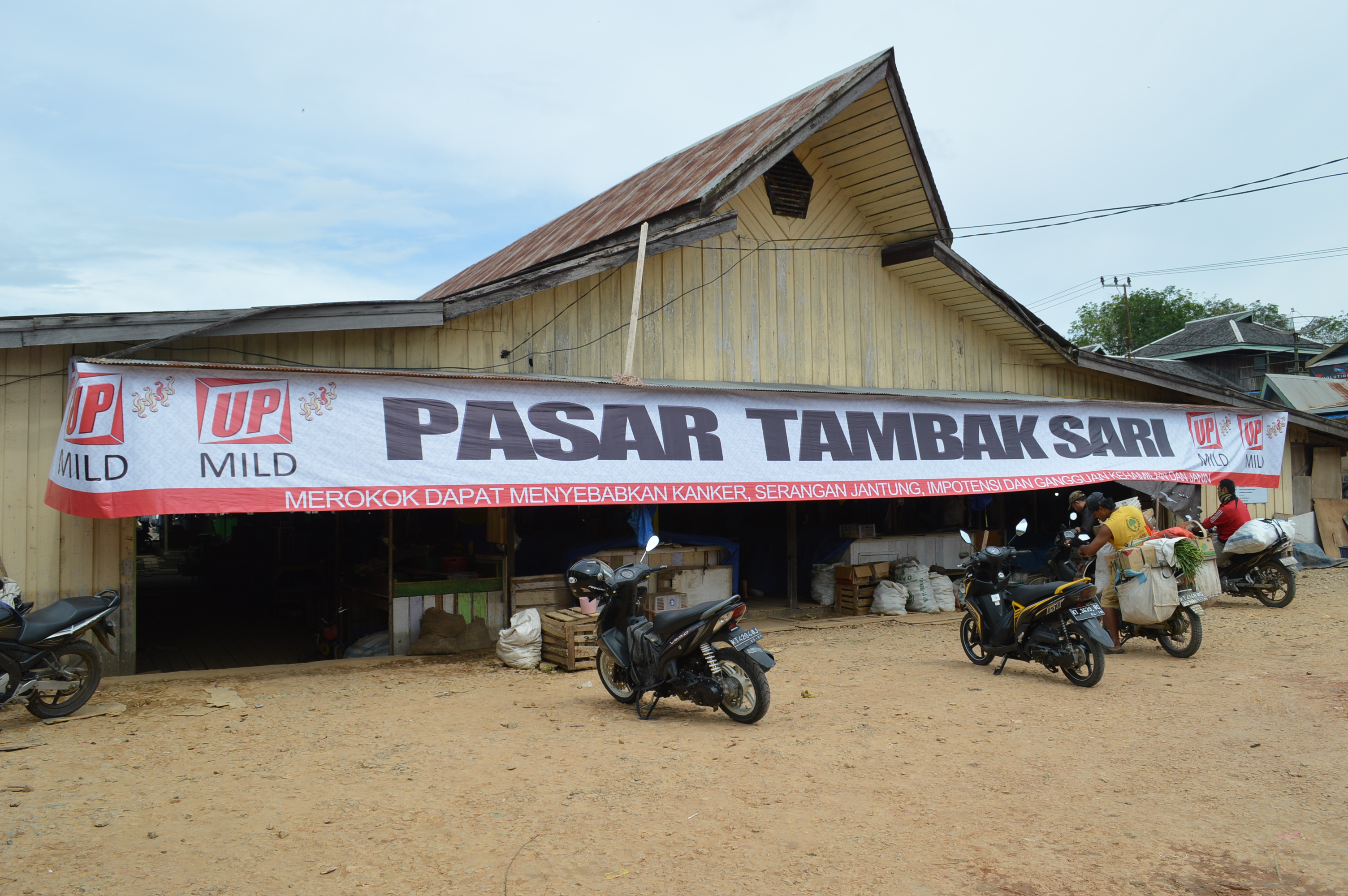
- Tambak Sari Market
- Interactive map of Kota Bangun
- Location in Kalimantan and Indonesia Kota Bangun (Kalimantan) Kota Bangun (Indonesia)
- Coordinates: 0°15′55.55876″S 116°35′28.73198″E
- Country: Indonesia
- Province: East Kalimantan
- Regency: Kutai Kartanegara
- District seat: Kota Bangun Ulu

Area
  - Total: 419 km^{2} (162 sq mi)

Population (2022)
  - Total: 25,029
  - Density: 59.7/km^{2} (155/sq mi)
- Time zone: UTC+8 (ICT)
- Regional code: 64.02.08
- Villages: 11

Kota Bangun (Indonesian pronunciation: [ˈkota ˈbaŋʊn]) is a district of Kutai Kartanegara Regency, East Kalimantan, Indonesia. As of 2022, it was inhabited by 25,029 people, and currently has a total area of 419 km^{2}. Its district seat is located at the village of Kota Bangun Ulu.

Kota Bangun shares borders with Muara Kaman to the north and the east, Kenohan to the northwest, Muara Wis to the west, and Kota Bangun Darat to the south.

== History ==
On 11 June 1996, Muara Wis was created from western parts of Kota Bangun. Meanwhile, on 19 October 2020, the new district of Kota Bangun Darat was split off from the district.
