= Tidung people =

Native group of people from Borneo

Tidung people Tidung تيدوڠ
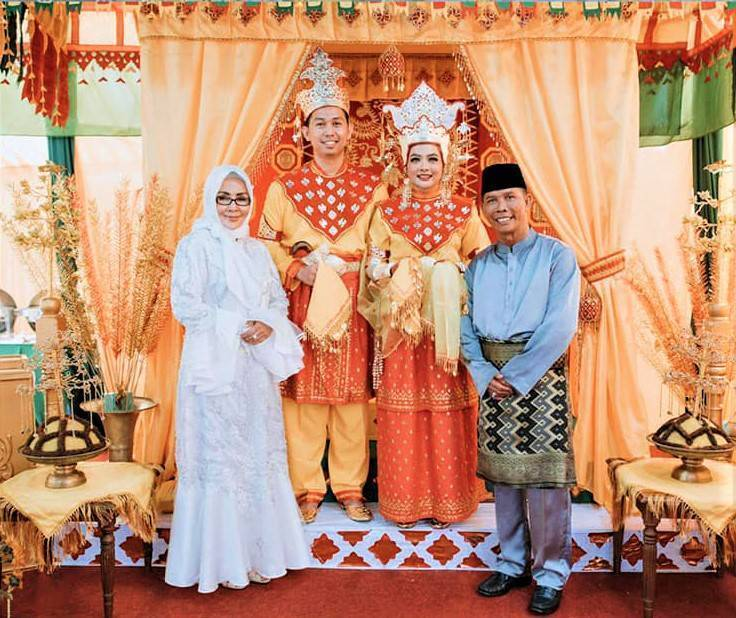
- Traditional marriage attire of Tidung people, native inhabitants of region around Tana Tidung Regency, North Kalimantan, Indonesia.

Total population
- 76,000

Regions with significant populations
- Indonesia around 27,000 (North Kalimantan) Malaysia; 28,715 (Sabah)

Languages
- Tidung language (Nunukan Tidung, Sesayap Tidung, Kalabakan) also Serudung, Indonesian, and Sabah Malay, English

Religion
- Islam

Related ethnic groups
- Banjarese, Bakumpai, Bulungan, Kutai, Murut, Lun Bawang/Lundayeh, Paser

The Tidung (Jawi: تيدوڠ) are a native group originating from Tana Tidung, now part of North Kalimantan province in Indonesian Borneo. Previously they were citizens of Kingdom of Tidung, then forming a new identity as a single ethnic group.

The Tidung speak the Tidung language, a North Bornean language. The Tidung are traditionally farmers practising slash-and-burn agriculture. Some are ocean fishermen. They grow sweet potatoes, cassava, lentils, fruits, and vegetables. Their farming methods are often accused of being the main cause of forest fires in Kalimantan.

The rise of the Muslim Kingdom of Tidung molded the ethnogenesis character of the Tidung people. They collectively known as a Malayised Dayak (Indonesian: Dayak berbudaya Melayu or Dayak-Melayu) people of Kalimantan similar to other native Muslim eastern coastal Borneo groups, such as the Bulungan, Berau, Kutai, Banjar, and Paser.

== Etymology ==
The term tidung in Tarakan language of the Tidung people literally means "hill" or "hill people". As with many other tribes of the Malay Archipelago, the term tidung is a collective term used to describe many closely related indigenous groups. The different groups of Tidung people describe themselves in all cases as Tidung people, however, they are summarized by modern ethnology as a common people group due to similarities in cultural and religious traditions.

== Settlement areas ==
The traditional territories of the Tidung people are at the Sembakung River, North Kalimantan and Sibuku River of their headwaters to the estuary north of Tarakan Island, Indonesia thence along the coast; south to the river-mouth of Bulungan River and northward up to Tawau, Sabah, Malaysia including Cowie Harbour. An enclave of Tidung people located at Labuk River, opposite the city of Klagan.

== Demographics ==
The population of the Tidung people in Indonesia is estimated about 27,000 in the year of 2007. Meanwhile in Malaysia, in the state of Sabah, the census of 2010 (Census 2010) indicates a population of 28,515 Tidung. Whereas, Tidung people in other states have no statistical relevance.

== Language ==
Tidung among the languages of Kalimantan (orange #59, top)

The Tidung language spoken by the Tidung people is also part of other Murutic language, which in turn belongs to the Western Malayo-Polynesian languages. The Tidung language is spoken in different dialects, namely:-

- Nunukan, Penchangan, Sedalir, Tikal, Tarakan, Malinau, Sesayap and Sibuku dialect in Indonesia
- Tarakan and Sesayap dialect in Sabah, Malaysia

== Writing system ==
Prior to present-day Roman writing system, the Tidung people used Jawi script in their writings.

== Folktales and fables ==
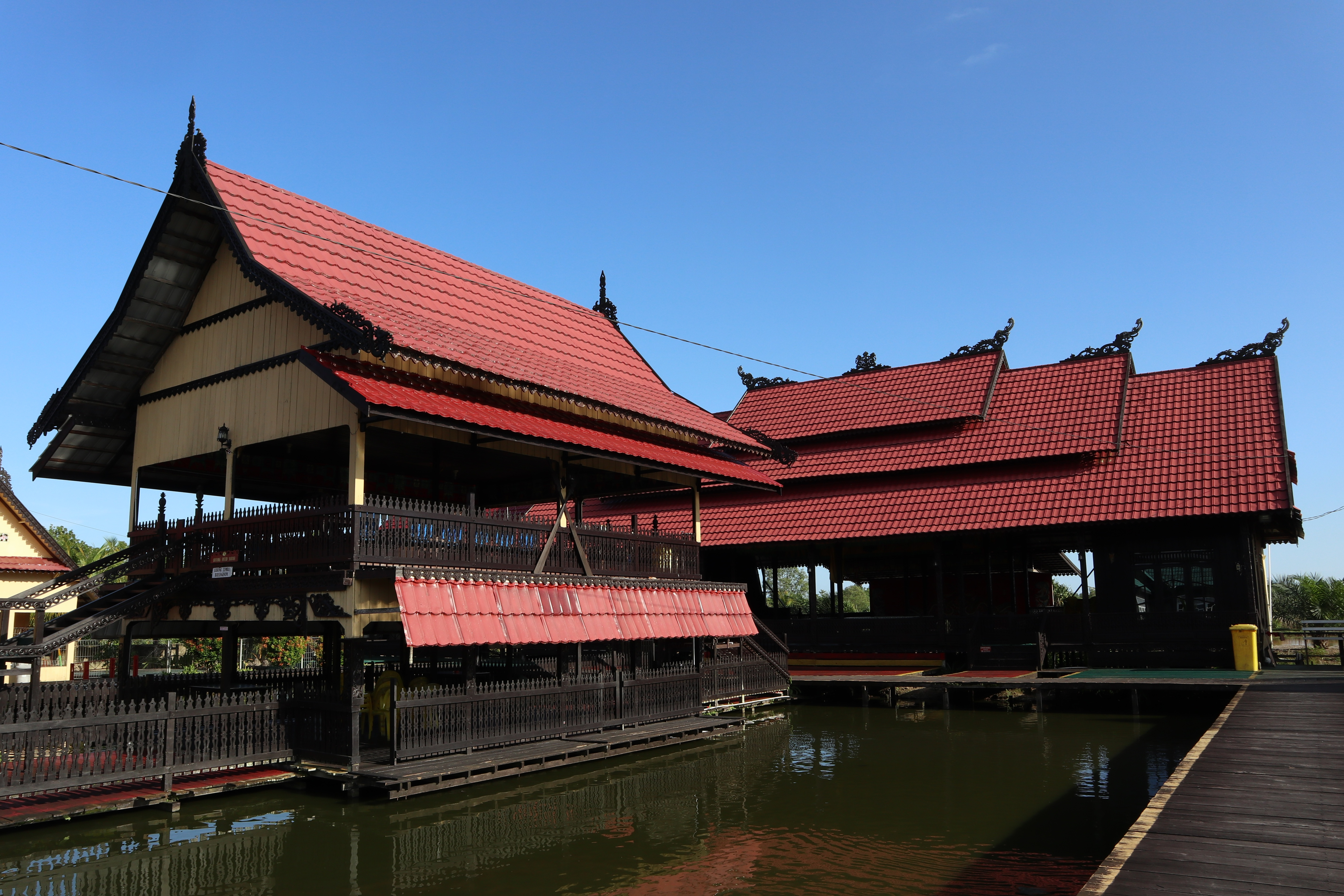
The Tidung Cultural Center in Tarakan, North Kalimantan

Among the Tidung folktale includes:

- Asal-usul Orang Tidung Tengara (The origin of Tidung Tenggara people)
- Lasedne sinan pagun (The sink of Jelutong village)
- Seludon Ibenayuk (The tale of Ibenayuk)
- Si Benua dan Si Sumbing (Benua and Sumbing)
- Seludon Yaki Yamus (The tale of Four-eyed king)
- Seludon Batu Tinagad (The logged stone)
- Yaki Balak (The story of Aki Balak)
