= Sesayap Tidung =

Sabahan language

Sesayap Tidong
- Northern Tidung
- Native to: Malaysia
- Region: Borneo
- Ethnicity: Tidung people
- Native speakers: (Perhaps 20,000, including the Nonukan Tidong spoken in Malaysia cited 2000)
- Language family: Austronesian: Malayo-Polynesian; North Bornean; Southwest Sabahan; Murutic; Northern; Sesayap Tidong

Language codes
- ISO 639-3: ntd
- Glottolog: nort3262

Sesayap Tidong or Northern Tidung is one of several Sabahan languages of Sabah, Malaysia, spoken by the Tidong people. It retains the system of Austronesian alignment that has been lost by Southern Tidung in Kalimantan, Indonesia.
