= Sultanate of Kutai =

Former sultanate in Indonesia

Sultanate of Kutai Kartanegara ing Martadipura كسلطانن كوتاي كرتانݢارا ايڠ مرتاڤورا
- 1300–present
- Flag of The Sultanate of Kutai Kertanegara Ing Martadipura

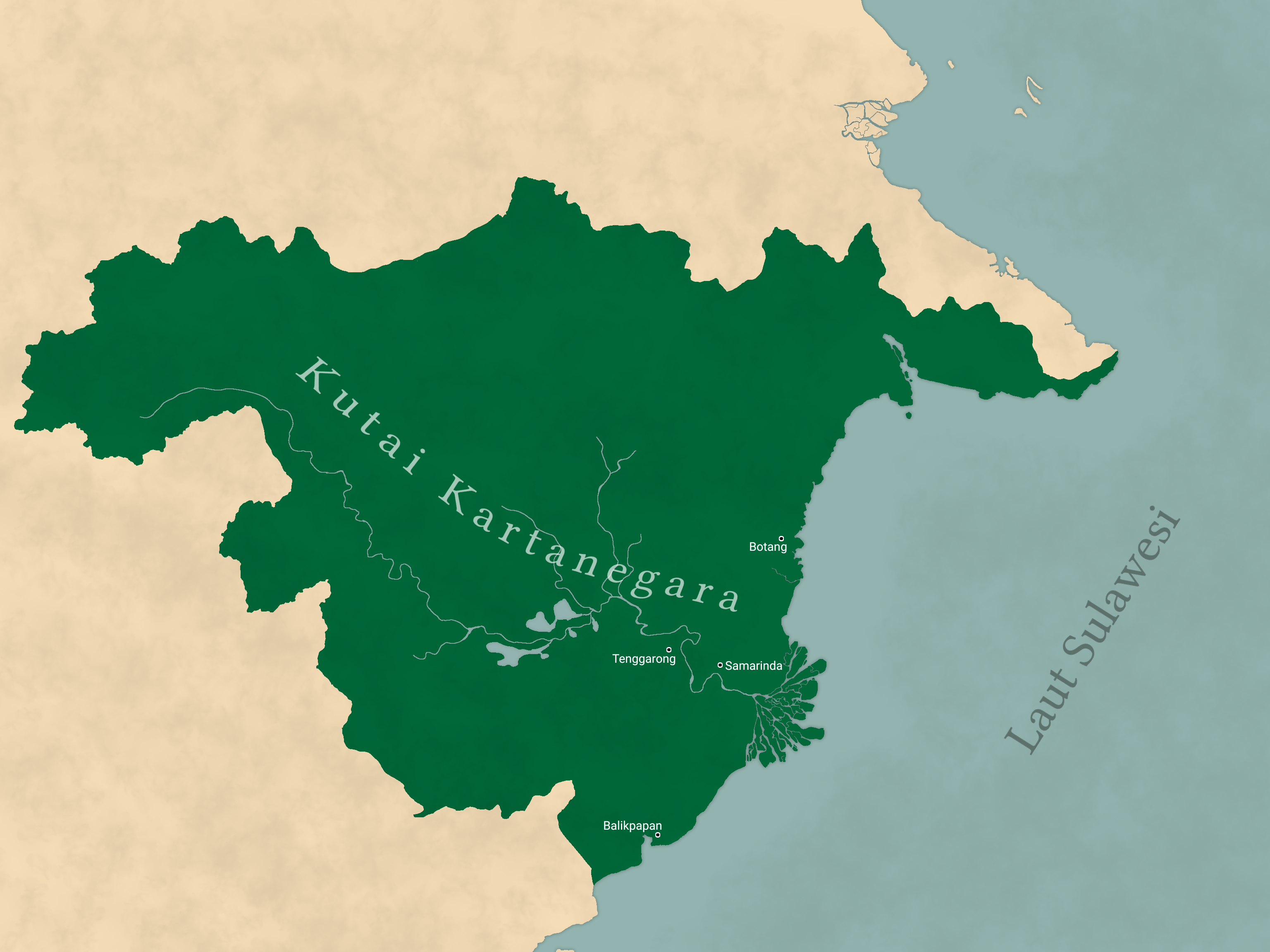
- Territory of the Kutai Sultanate (in dark green) since the reign of Sultan Aji Muhammad Sulaiman, covering almost the entire present-day East Kalimantan Province.
- Capital: Kutai Lama (1300–1732); Pemarangan (1732–1782); Tenggarong (1782–present)
- Common languages: Kutai
- Religion: Islam (official); Kaharingan; Animism
- Demonym: Urang Kutai
- Government: Constitutional monarchy
- Sultan
  - 1300–1325: Raja Aji Batara Agung Dewa Sakti
  - 1845–1899: Sultan Aji Muhammad Sulaiman
  - 1920–1981 (reduced status since 1960): Sultan Aji Muhammad Parikesit
  - 1999–2018: Sultan Aji Muhammad Salehuddin II
  - 2018–present: Sultan Aji Muhammad Arifin
- History
  - Established: 1300
  - Disestablished: 1950 present
| Preceded by | Succeeded by |
| Kingdom of Kutai Martapura | State of East Kalimantan; Province of East Kalimantan |

The Sultanate of Kutai, officially Sultanate of Kutai Kartanegara ing Martadipura, was a kingdom in the eastern part of Borneo, which originated from the Hindu Kingdom of Martapura founded in 1300 at Kutai Lama. It later transformed into an Islamic kingdom in 1575, and continued until its political and administrative authority effectively ended in 1960.

The early royal court was located at Jaitan Layar and later moved to Tepian Batu. In 1732, the capital was transferred to Jembayan, and in 1782 moved again to Tenggarong.

For reasons of stability and defense, the royal center shifted to Pemarangan, and finally to Tepian Pandan. In 1635, the Kingdom of Kutai Kartanegara defeated the Kingdom of Kutai Martapura. Following this victory, Kutai Kartanegara annexed Martapura and changed its name to the Kingdom of Kutai Kartanegara ing Martapura.

After the integration of the Kutai Sultanate into Indonesia and the dissolution of the Special Region of Kutai in 1960, the sultanate was symbolically revived in 1999 by the government of Kutai Kartanegara Regency as part of cultural preservation efforts. This revival was marked by the enthronement of Crown Prince Aji Pangeran Prabu Anum Surya Adiningrat as the 20th Sultan of Kutai Kartanegara ing Martadipura with the title Sultan Aji Muhammad Salehuddin II on 22 September 2001.

== History ==
=== Early establishment ===
The Kingdom of Kutai Kartanegara was founded in the 14th century in the area of Kutai Lama, at the mouth of the Mahakam River. The first ruler was Aji Batara Agung Dewa Sakti (r. 1300–1325). According to oral traditions, he was believed to possess supernatural powers that enabled him to gain legitimacy among the coastal communities.

During the following centuries, the kingdom expanded its influence over trade routes and inland areas. The rulers adopted titles influenced by Hindu–Javanese culture, reflecting contacts with Majapahit. In the 16th century, Islam began spreading into the region through traders, and in 1575 the kingdom officially converted to Islam under the rule of Aji Raja Mahkota Mulia Alam.

=== Conflict with Martapura ===
The Kingdom of Kutai Martapura, centered in Muara Kaman, had existed since the 4th century and is often considered the earliest Hindu kingdom in the Indonesian archipelago. By the 17th century, its power had declined. In 1635, Kutai Kartanegara attacked and defeated Martapura. The victory resulted in the unification of the two kingdoms under the name Kutai Kartanegara ing Martapura.

=== Colonial period ===
Kutai established relations with European powers after the arrival of the Dutch in the 17th century. By the 19th century, the sultanate became a vassal under the Dutch East Indies, though internal autonomy was largely maintained. Sultan Aji Muhammad Sulaiman (r. 1845–1899) is noted for modernizing the palace administration and promoting Islamic learning.

=== Integration into Indonesia ===
After Indonesian independence in 1945, the sultanate initially maintained its authority as a daerah istimewa (special region). However, in 1960, the central government dissolved the special status, fully integrating the region into East Kalimantan Province. Sultan Aji Muhammad Parikesit (r. 1920–1981) was the last to hold political power.

=== Cultural revival ===
In 1999, as part of cultural preservation, the Kutai Kartanegara Regency government supported the revival of the sultanate as a traditional institution. The enthronement of Aji Muhammad Salehuddin II in 2001 reaffirmed its role as a cultural and spiritual symbol rather than a political entity.

== See also ==
- Kutai Martadipura Kingdom
- Kutai Kartanegara Regency
- Erau Festival
