= Berau Malays =

Ethnic group native to East Kalimantan

Urang Barrau, Urang Banua

Total population
- 20,000

Regions with significant populations
- Indonesia (East Kalimantan): 12,000

Languages
- Berau Malay (native); Banjarese, Kutainese, and Indonesian

Religion
- Sunni Islam

Related ethnic groups
- Dayak (Gaai) • Kutainese • Banjarese

The Berau people (Berau Malay: Urang Barrau, Urang Banua), also known as the Banua or Berau Malays, a Malayized-Dayak people, is an ethnic group that lives in Berau Regency, in the north of the province of East Kalimantan, Indonesia. They have kinship ties with other native Malays groups on the east coast of Borneo, such as Kutainese, Bulungan, Paser, and also Banjarese at the southern tip.

The Berau culture began with the former Berau Kingdom, a kingdom established by Baddit Dipattung or Aji Raden Surya Nata Kesuma and his wife, Baddit Kurindan or Aji Permaisuri, centered in Lati River, Gunung Tabur in 14th century. They united traditional Berau villages called Banua, such as Banua Merancang, Banua Pantai, Banua Kuran, Banua Rantau Buyut, and Banua Rantau Sewakung. Exploiting internal divisions, VOC successfully split the kingdom to two, Sambaliung Sultanate and Gunung Tabur Sultanate. Islam arrived around the same time in 17th century brought by the figure Imam Sambuayan.

They speak Berau Malay language, locally called Berau or Banua language, which is one of the several native Malayic languages in the eastern and southeastern part of Borneo, closely related to Banjarese, Bukit Malay, and Kutainese.

== Folk songs ==
- Kabbar Di Rantau
- Mun Rangat Akhirnya
