= Berau Malay =

Austronesian language spoken in Kalimantan, Indonesia

- basa Barrau, basa Banua
- Native to: Indonesia
- Ethnicity: Berau Malays
- Native speakers: 11,000 (2007)
- Language family: Austronesian: Malayo-Polynesian; Malayo-Chamic; Malayic; Berau Malay

Language codes
- ISO 639-3: bve
- Glottolog: bera1262
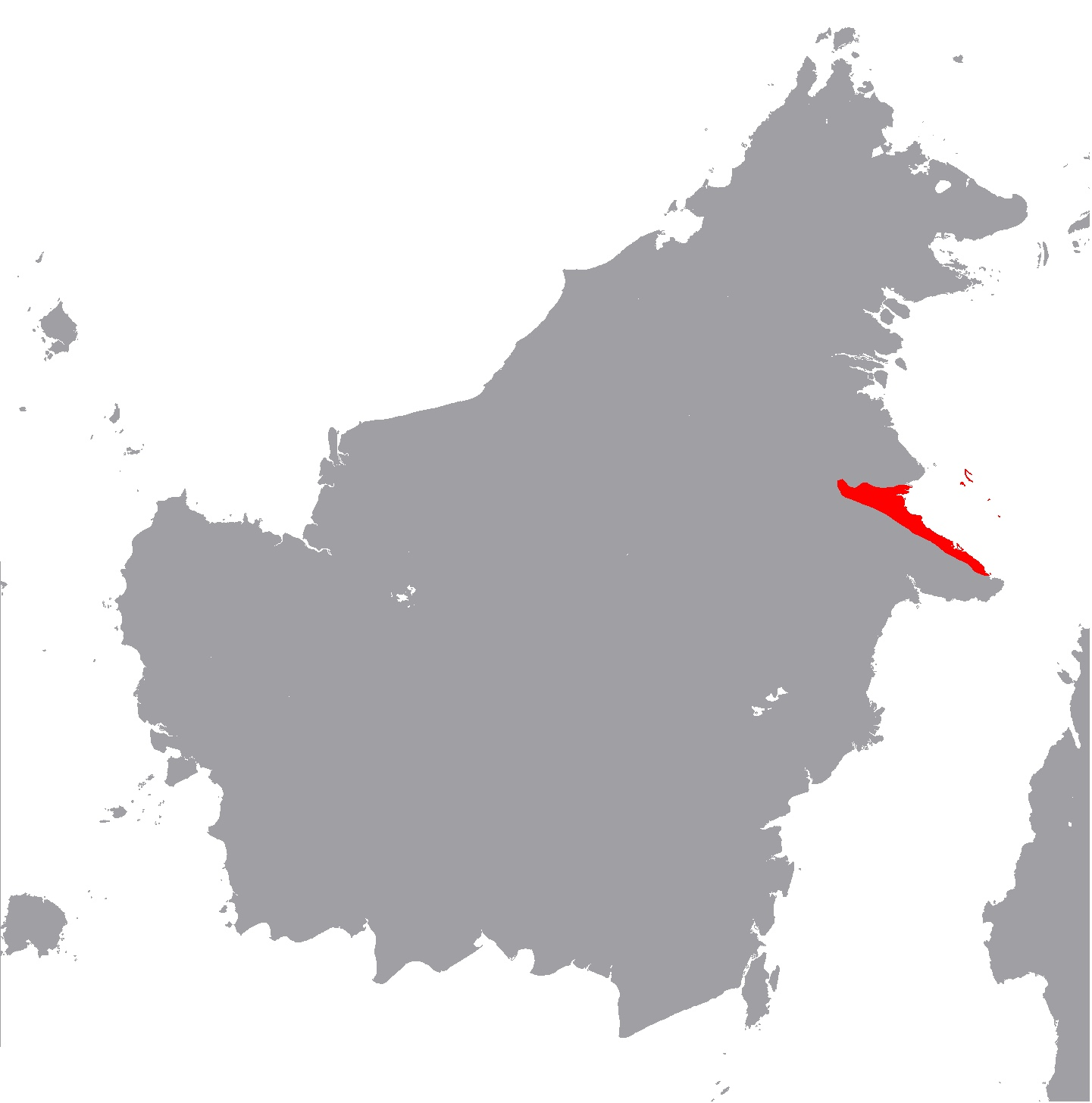

Berau Malay, or simply Berau, is a Malayic language spoken by Berau Malays in Berau Regency, East Kalimantan, Indonesia. It is one three native Malayic varieties in southern and eastern Borneo, along with Banjar and Kutainese, of which it forms a dialect continuum. According to the 2007 edition of Ethnologue, there were 11,200 speakers of Berau Malay.

Berau has received little attention by foreign linguists. According to James T. Collins in 2006, it is characterized by loss of glottal consonants *ʔ and *h, and the sequence *-əC- became into -aCC (also shared by Makassarese). The latter change has created contrastive gemination in the language, such as tabu 'mosque drum' vs. tabbu 'sugar cane' (← *təbu) and ini 'this' vs. inni 'grandparent'. Berau has a very small vowel inventory, consisting of /a/, /i/, and /u/. Collins stated that Berau is most closely related to the Kota Bangun dialect of Kutainese. It also appears to be mutually intelligible with Brunei Malay or Banjarese.
