= Kutai people =

Ethnic group in Indonesia

Kutainese people
Urang Kutai (Tenggarong Malay) Urang Kutai (Kota Bangun Malay)

Total population
- ± 280,000

Regions with significant populations
- Indonesia (East Kalimantan)

Languages
- Kutainese and Indonesian

Religion
- Islam (majority), Christianity, Kaharingan

Related ethnic groups
- Berau • Paser • Banjar

The Kutainese people or Kutai people (Tenggarong Kutai Malay: Urang Kutai; Kota Bangun Kutai Malay: Urang Kutai), are a Malayic ethnic group that inhabit major parts of Indonesian province of East Kalimantan (i.e. throughout the historical region of Kutai), especially the regencies of East Kutai, Kutai Kartanegara, and West Kutai (all of them were previously part of the Special Region of Kutai). They descended from earlier Dayak peoples who have later embraced Islam.

== History ==
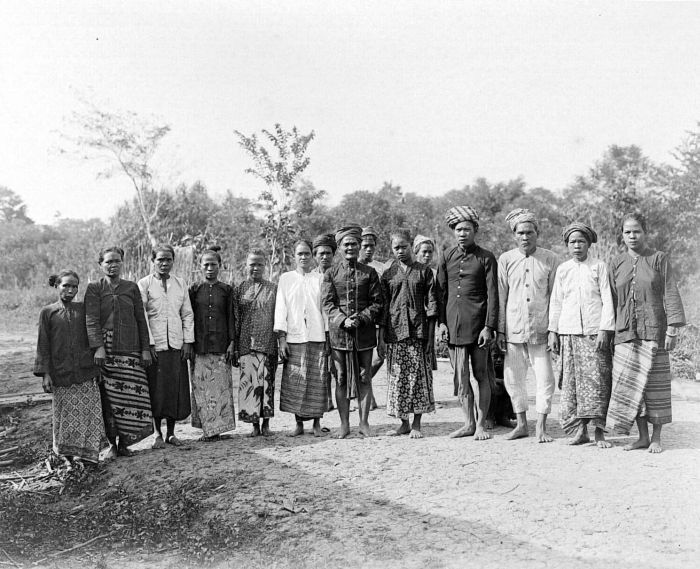
Temenggung from Kendisik in Muara Pahu.

The Kutai people are descended from various Dayak peoples (sometimes grouped as "Ot Danum", an umbrella term for Barito-speaking groups) living throughout the Mahakam basin, who later adhered to Islam and subject to Malayisation. Clans that would form this ethnic group include Pantun, Punang, Pahu, Tulur Dijangkat, and Melani. Because of this, these group became referred to by other Dayaks as Haloq, a Benuaq label used to refer Dayaks who had left their original culture (such activity is called behaloq, which then evolved into pahuuq which means a Muslim). According to some other sources, Haloq is also used to refer to various immigrant ethnic groups living in the region, including Javanese and Buginese peoples. Nowadays, the term has since rarely used, and only preserved on toponyms Long Beleh Haloq and Marah Haloq (both are villages in Kutai Kartanegara and East Kutai, respectively).

The term "Kutai" was originally not used for the ethnic group, until 1635, when the Sultanate of Kutai Kartanegara under Prince Sinum Panji Mendapa invaded the neighbouring Hindu kingdom of Martapura led by Darmasetia, effectively ending the 12th century rule by Mulawarman dynasty. Following the event, its soldiers escaped to the forests and the inhabitants of Muara Kaman were required to pay tribute each year, however, the reason behind the invasion was not specified by Salasilah Kutai. The event forged the creation of a distinct Kutai identity, and forced the resisting Dayak peoples to migrate interiors.

Between 16th and 17th century, Islam began to be introduced throughout the Kutai region by Tuan Tunggang Parangan, a Minangkabau cleric who previously Islamised peoples in South Sulawesi. However, his true identity is disputed between Syekh Abdurahman Al-Idrus, Abdul Jawad, or Habib Hasyim bin Musayya bin Yahya. According to a local legend, the king of Kutai Kertanegara was lost against him during a four-round show of power, and finally agreed to pronounce the Shahada in order to convert to Islam.

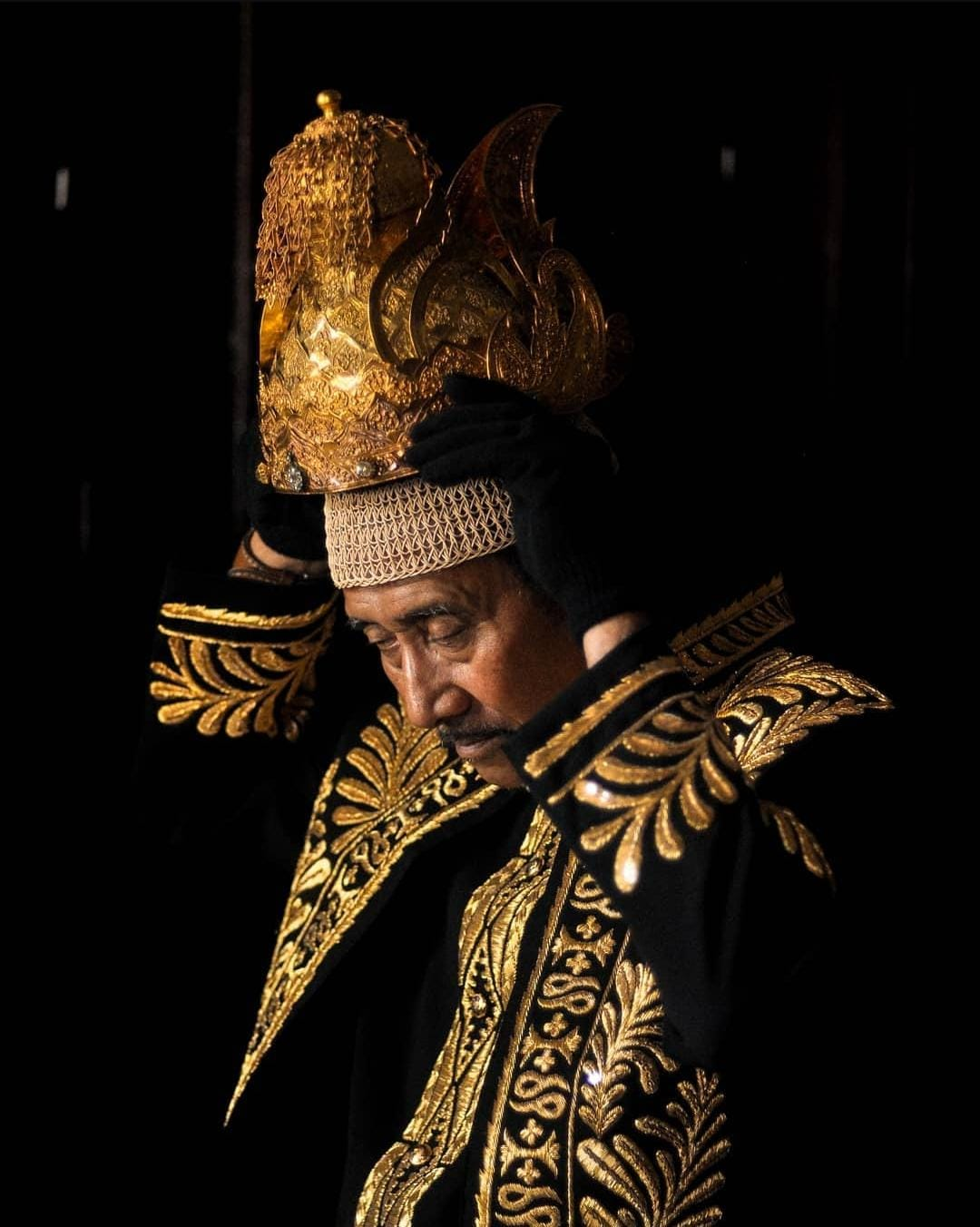
Aji Muhammad Arifin, 21st Sultan of Kutai Kertanegara (2018–)

The Sultanate of Kutai Kertanegara still retained much of the political power throughout the region until mid-20th century, when its last iteration, Special Region of Kutai, a second-level special region similar to a regency, was abolished de jure on 26 June 1959 and de facto ceremonially on 21 January 1960 by its last sultan Aji Muhammad Parikesit, transferring its powers to his three successors. However, in the wake of 21st century, the Sultanate of Kutai Kartanegara was revived as a cultural institution in 2001, with Aji Muhammad Salehuddin II emerging as the new sultan.

== Demographics ==
Kutai people and other indigenous ethnic groups (Dayaks) apparently only form a minority in East Kalimantan, there are around 280,000 people belonging to the Kutai ethnic alone. Kutai people can also be further divided into several subgroups, including Pahu, Kedang, Punang, Talun, Tuana, Tembai, Pantun, Lampong, and Melanti.

=== Religion ===
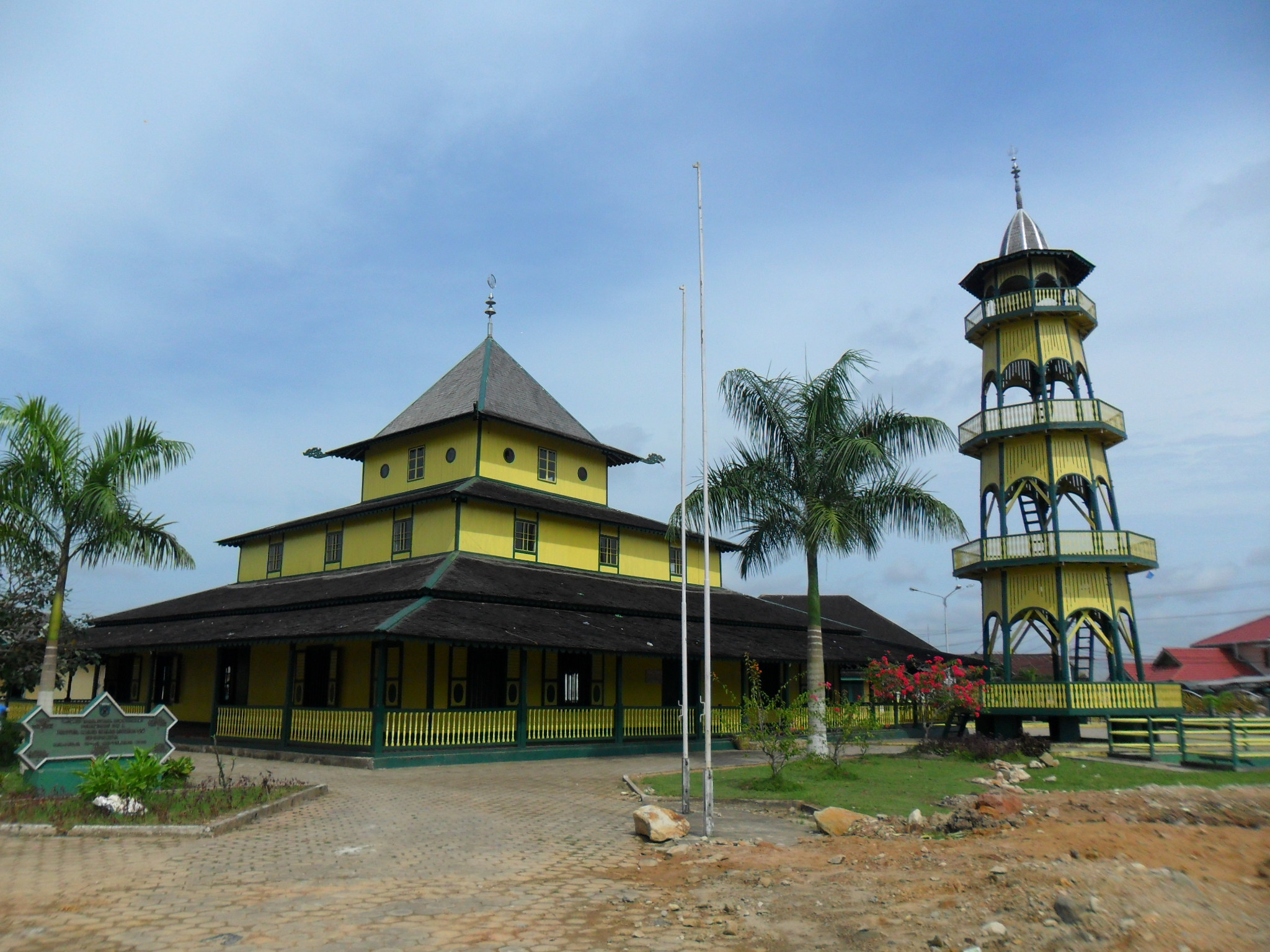
Shiratal Mustaqiem Mosque in Samarinda Seberang, the oldest surviving mosque in East Kalimantan.

As previously stated on the #History section, Islam was introduced in Kutai between 16th and 17th centuries by clerics from South Sulawesi, making it the majority religion of the Kutai people. A notable exception is the inhabitants of Kedang Ipil village in Kota Bangun Darat, Kutai Kartanegara, where majority of them are Catholics following mass conversion from Kaharingan or Kutai Adat Lawas (traditional religion) in 1978 (although some of the locals had converted earlier into Protestant Christianity or Islam).

== Culture ==
=== Cuisine ===
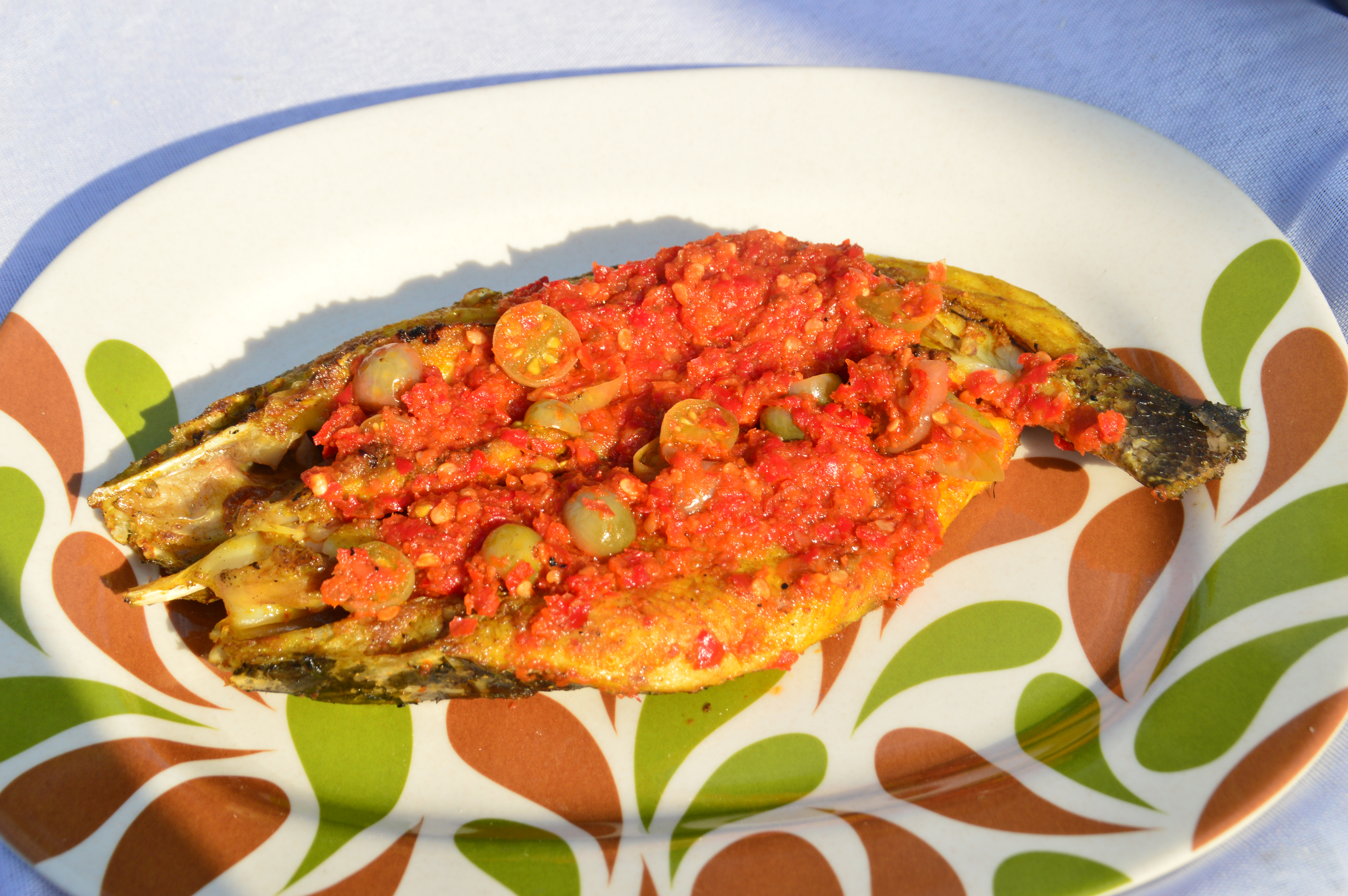
Gence ruan

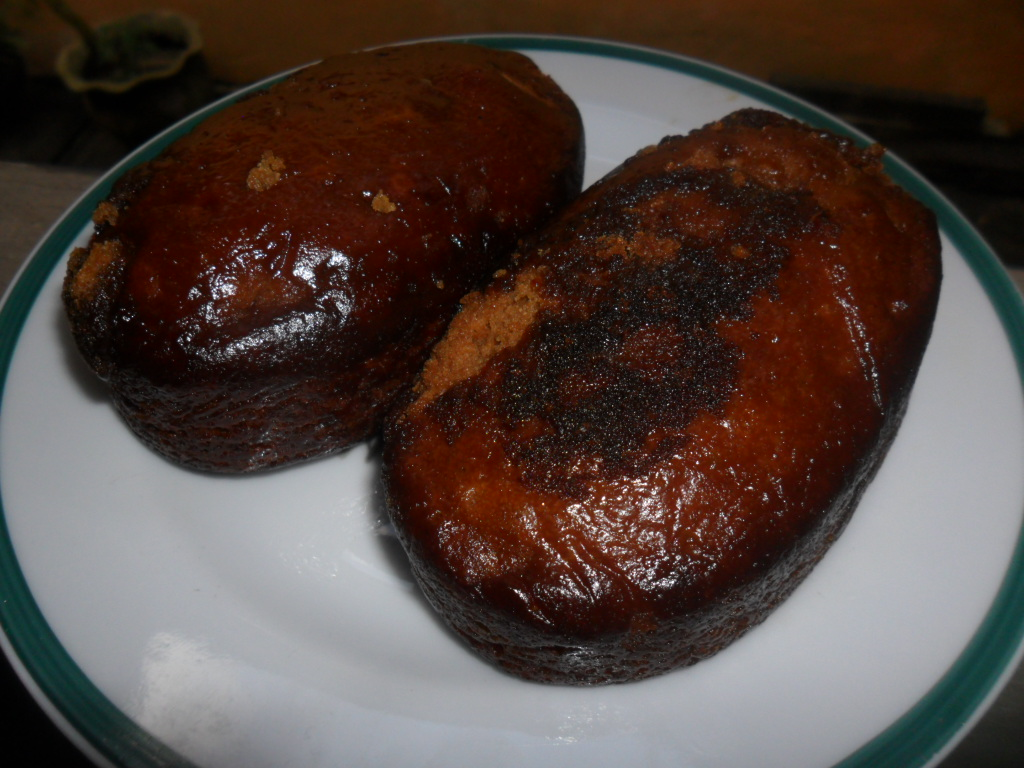
Roti balok

Like many other regions in Indonesia, Kutai traditional cuisine is very diverse. Some notable popular dishes characteristic of Kutai people include nasi bekepor (a dish similar to nasi liwet, usually complemented by sambal raja), gence ruan (made from Channa striata or mudfish), pulut nasi (a mixture of rice and coconut cream wrapped in banana leaves), sayur asam Kutai (vegetable soup featuring mudfish heads), sate payau (a type of satay made from venison).

=== Folk costumes ===
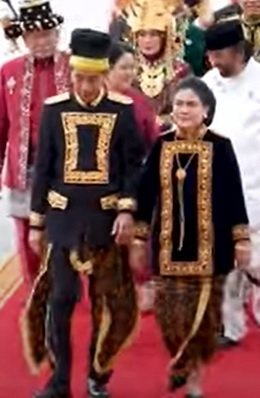
Kustim or kustin, worn by president Joko Widodo in 2024

Folk costumes of the Kutai people include kustim / kustin and takwo, formal costumes that were traditionally worn by upper-middle classes and the nobility, and sakai, a garment made from skin or wood fiber, traditionally only worn by women.

=== Folk dances ===
External videos
- Fenomena Tari Jepen (a documentary covering Jepen by Publik Khatulistiwa TV, dated from 2007)

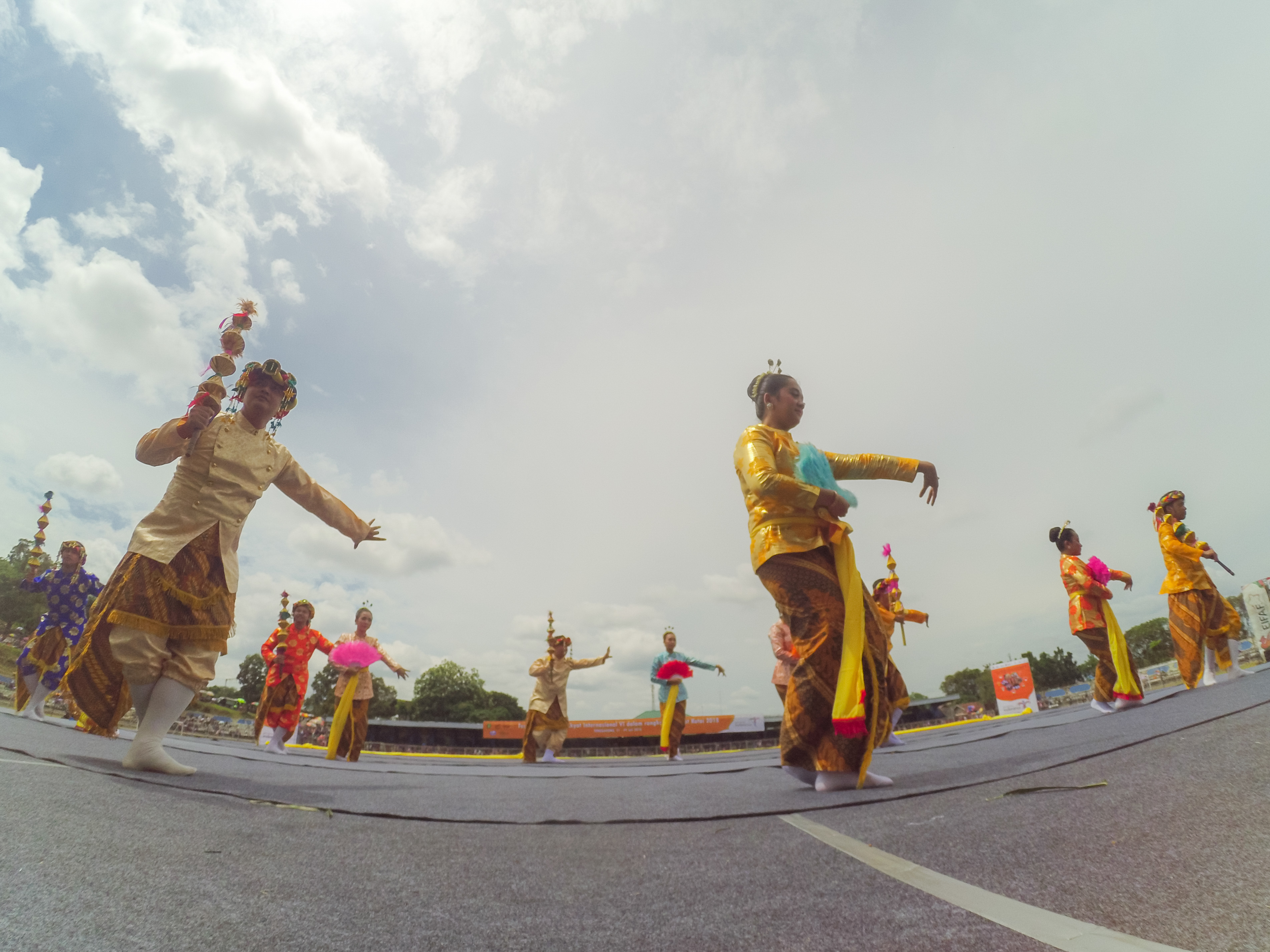
Ganjur

Kutai folk dances can be distinguished into two types:

- Popular dance art consists of creations that developed among the commoners. Examples include Jepen (Zapin), which originated from around the Mahakam River and coastal regions. Jepen is usually accompanied with Tingkilan ensemble (see below) and can be performed in singles or pairs. Nowadays, it has spawned multiple creative dances.
- Classical dance art was developed in the environs of Sultanate of Kutai Kertanegara, and several of them have received Javanese influence. These include:
  - Tari Persembahan ('dedication dance'), performed by women and originally intended for a royal audience.
  - Ganjur, performed by men in pairs, featuring an eponymous gada with fabric and it is accompanied by gamelan.
  - Kanjar, can be performed by either men or women, but with movements freer than Ganjur.
  - Tari Topeng ('mask dance'), only intended for a royal audience and also accompanied by gamelan. The dance itself consists of 12 types, including Penembe, Kemindhu, Patih, Temenggung, Kelana, Wirun, Gunung Sari, Panji, Rangga, Togoq, Bota and Tembam.
  - Tari Dewa Memanah ('arrow-shooting god dance'), performed by a chief punggawa who is doing archery with five-pointed arrows, and a mantra is also read (bemamang) to drive out evil spirits as well as to pray for a peaceful and prosperous people.

=== Language ===
Kutai people traditionally spoke the varieties of Kota Bangun (consists of Kedang, Lampong, Pantun, and Tembai dialects) in the interiors of East Kalimantan, and of Tenggarong (Melanti dialect only), most dominant in the capital of Kutai Kartanegara and the coastal areas of East Kalimantan. Although these are often viewed as different dialects of the same language, both of them have issued their own ISO 639-3 codes (with the exception of Muara Ancalong variety).

Kutai people have their own forms of oral literature, such as tarsul, protak, pantun, sa’er, ladon, dandeng, memang, sawai, and others. Like other languages in Sumatra or Borneo, Kutainese was also written in the Jawi script. However, the status of Kutainese languages have become endangered over time. To combat against this, the local government of Kutai Kartanegara has introduced the language to schoolchildren since 2022, and introduced its own online dictionary.

=== Music ===
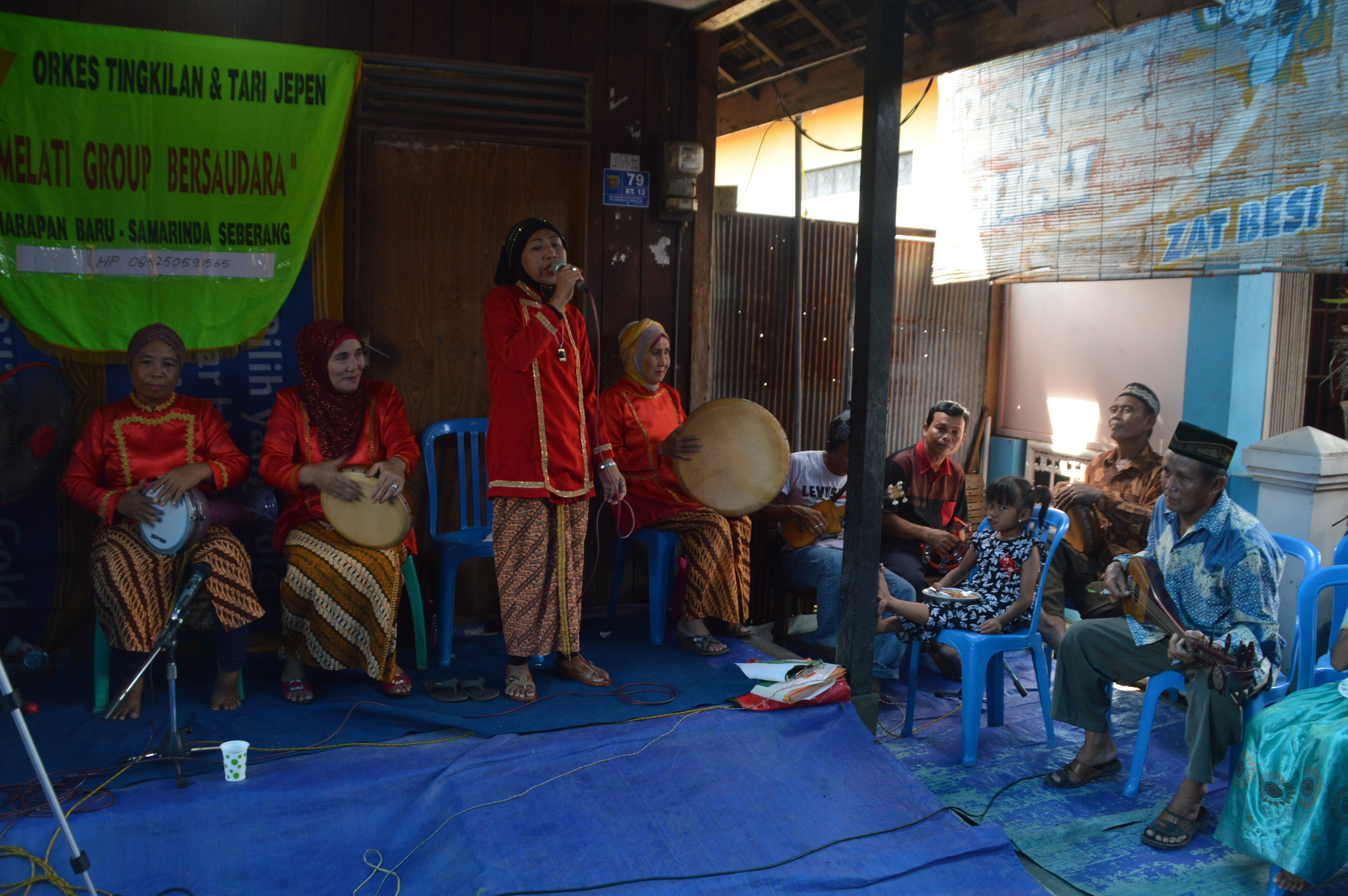
Tingkilan music players in Samarinda Seberang, 2016

Tingkilan is the traditional ensemble music of Kutai people, which consists of several instruments, including gambus, kendang, ketipung (a smaller version of kendang), and violin (a later influence from the Dutch). It is largely used to accompany Kutai traditional dances such as Jepen, but it also played during ceremonial or religious events.
