= Coat of arms of East Kalimantan =

- Shield: Vert, a hexagonal shield palewise Gules and Or, against a mandau and a sumpit arrow Argent crossing over; surrounded by a garland of 8 gouttes d'eau on the left and 9 gouttes d'or on the right. At the below, a ribbon Argent with the motto ruhui - rahayu, and at the top, a ribbon Or with the text KALIMANTAN - TIMUR with a star Or above.
- Motto: Ruhui - rahayu ('Peaceful and harmonious')

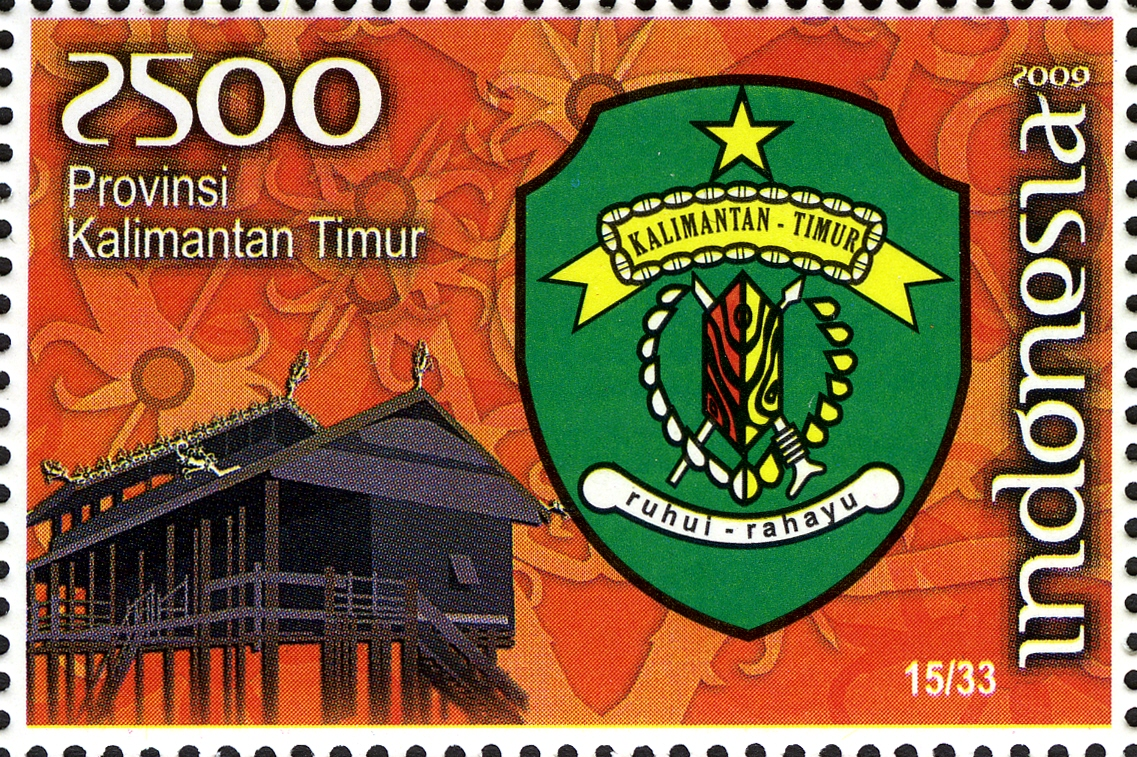
A postage stamp representing the coat of arms of East Kalimantan

The coat of arms of East Kalimantan (Indonesian: lambang Kalimantan Timur) consists of a five-pointed shield, which includes a star, talawang (hexagonal shield), mandau and sumpit arrow, and a garland of 8 gouttes d'eau and 9 gouttes d'or, each representing oil and resin, respectively.

The yellow star represents the belief in one God, the talawang represents peace, the mandau and sumpit represents the struggles of the people of East Kalimantan, and the oil and resin drops represents the rich natural resources of East Kalimantan. Inside the ribbon, there is a motto that reads "ruhui - rahayu", which is represents the ideals for a just, prosperous, peaceful people, as well as whose accepted by God.

== Creation ==
The coat of arms of East Kalimantan was designed by Soehadji, a veterinarian who had graduated from the Bogor Agricultural University and also designing abilities. In 1965, he was appointed as the head of East Kalimantan Zoological Agency, previously he was in charge as the Kutai Regency Zoological Agency at Tenggarong. Soehadji created the design for this coat, after the previous designs by a team created by the governor did not meet the criteria.

Soehadji proposed the concept for the coat of arms of East Kalimantan to Governor Abdoel Moeis Hassan. Originally, the lower ribbon contained the inscription Bujur Banar Ruhui Rahayu ('Really peaceful and harmonious'), however this motto was declined by Moeis after found that bujur translates to 'buttocks' in Sundanese and the original motto was overly long. His Sundanese knowledge was acquired by Moeis in 1952 when he served as the Head of the Social Office, East Kalimantan Residency and learned about Sundanese way of living in West Java. Soon after becoming the governor of East Kalimantan, Moeis officially launched cooperation with the local government of West Java. The governor declared that its motto had to be shortened into just Ruhui Rahayu, and this concept was soon accepted by East Kalimantan House of Representatives (DPRD) as the official coat of arms of East Kalimantan. Its legality was confirmed by Regional Regulation Number 1 of 20 November 1965.
