= Nunukan Tidung =

Sabahan language of Kalimantan (Indonesian Borneo)

Nunukan Tidong
- Southern Tidung
- Native to: Indonesia, Malaysia
- Region: Borneo
- Ethnicity: Tidung people
- Native speakers: 27,000 in Indonesia (2007); Unknown number across the bay in Sabah
- Language family: Austronesian: Malayo-Polynesian; North Bornean; Southwest Sabahan; Murutic; Southern; Nunukan Tidong

Language codes
- ISO 639-3: itd
- Glottolog: sout3241

Nunukan Tidong or Southern Tidung, is one of several Sabahan languages of Kalimantan, Indonesia, spoken by the Tidong people. It has lost the system of Austronesian alignment retained by Northern Tidung in Sabah, Malaysia.

== Phonology ==
Consonants
| | | Labial | Alveolar | Palatal | Velar | Glottal |
|---|---|---|---|---|---|---|
| Plosive/ Affricate | voiceless | p | t | | k | (ʔ) |
| Plosive/ Affricate | voiced | b | d | dʒ | ɡ | |
| Fricative | | | s | | | |
| Nasal | | m | n | ɲ | ŋ | |
| Rhotic | | | r | | | |
| Lateral | | | l | | | |
| Approximant | | w | | j | | |

- [ʔ] may also occur, but only phonetically before initial vowels.

Vowels
| | Front | Central | Back |
|---|---|---|---|
| High | i | | u |
| Mid | | ə | |
| Low | | a | |

- [e] and [o] may also occur, but only in complimentary distribution with /i/ and /u/.
