= Aji Muhammad Salehuddin II =

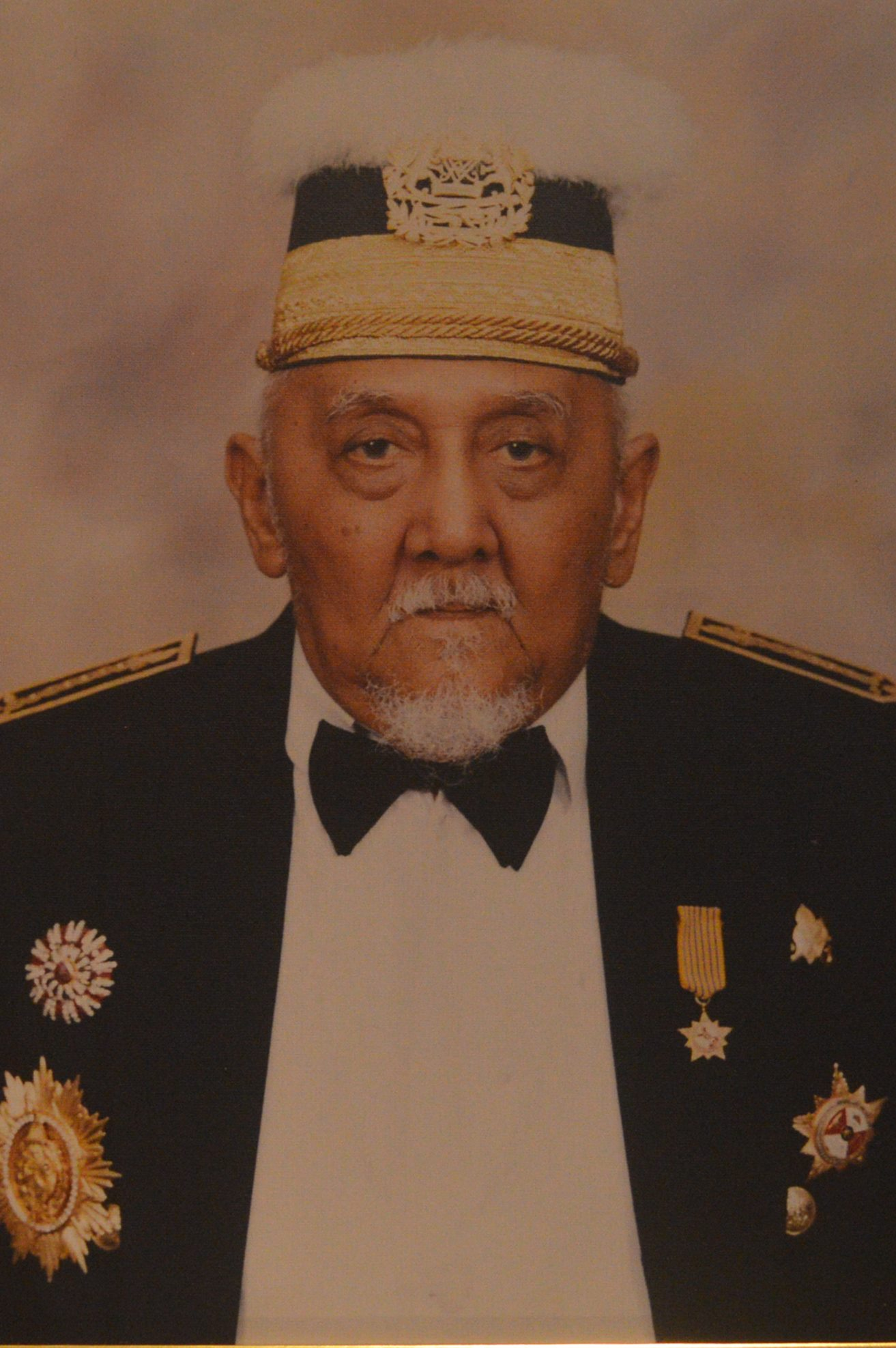

Sultan of Kutai
- Reign: 1999–5 August 2018
- Coronation: 22 September 2001
- Predecessor: Aji Muhammad Parikesit
- Successor: Aji Muhammad Arifin
- Born: 24 October 1924; Tenggarong, Dutch East Indies
- Died: 5 August 2018 (aged 93); Tenggarong, Indonesia
- Spouse: Aji Aida Amidjoyo
- Father: Aji Muhammad Parikesit
- Mother: Aji Ratu Bariah
- Religion: Islam

Hajji Aji Prabu Anum Prince Surya Adiningrat, entitled Sultan Haji Aji Muhammad Salehuddin II bin Sultan Adji Muhammad Parikesit or also called Prince Praboe (24 October 1924 – 5 August 2018) was an Indonesian royal and politician who was Kutai Sultan of the Kutai Kartanegara Sultanate.

In 1999, the Kutai Kartanegara Regent, Syaukani Hasan Rais, intended to revive the Kutai Kartanegara ing Sultanate of Martadipura. The return of the Kutai Sultanate was not intended to revive feudalism in the region, but as an effort to preserve the historical and cultural heritage of the Kutai Kingdom as the oldest kingdom in Indonesia. In addition, the revival of the Kutai Kartanegara Sultanate tradition is to support the East Kalimantan tourism sector in an effort to attract domestic and foreign tourists.

On November 7, 2000, the Kutai Kartanegara Regent together with the Crown Prince of Kutai Aji Pangeran Praboe Anoem Soerja Adiningrat faced Indonesian President Abdurrahman Wahid at Bina Graha Jakarta to convey the restoration intentions, and approved it.

On September 22, 2001, the Son of the Crown of the Kutai Kartanegara Sultanate, H. Aji Prince Praboe Anoem Soerya Adiningrat was named the Sultan of Kutai Kartanegara with the title Sultan H. Aji Muhammad Salehuddin II. H.A.P. Praboe as the Sultan of Kutai Kartanegara was only held on September 22, 2001.

The coronation itself was acknowledged by all the relatives of the Koetai ing Martadipura Sultanate and the Kutai Kartanegara Regency Government. In fact, was built a palace located just behind the Mulawarman Museum the former palace or the old royal center.
