= Kutainese language =

Austronesian language spoken in Kalimantan, Indonesia

Kutai
- Kutainese
- Native to: Indonesia
- Region: West Kutai, Kutai Kartanegara, Samarinda, and East Kutai (East Kalimantan)
- Ethnicity: Kutai
- Native speakers: (300,000 cited 1981)
- Language family: Austronesian: Malayo-Polynesian; Malayo-Chamic; Malayic; Kutai
- Dialects: Ancalong; Kota Bangun; Tenggarong

Language codes
- ISO 639-3: Either: mqg – Kota Bangun vkt – Tenggarong
- Glottolog: anca1243 Ancalong kota1275 Kota Bangun teng1267 Tenggarong
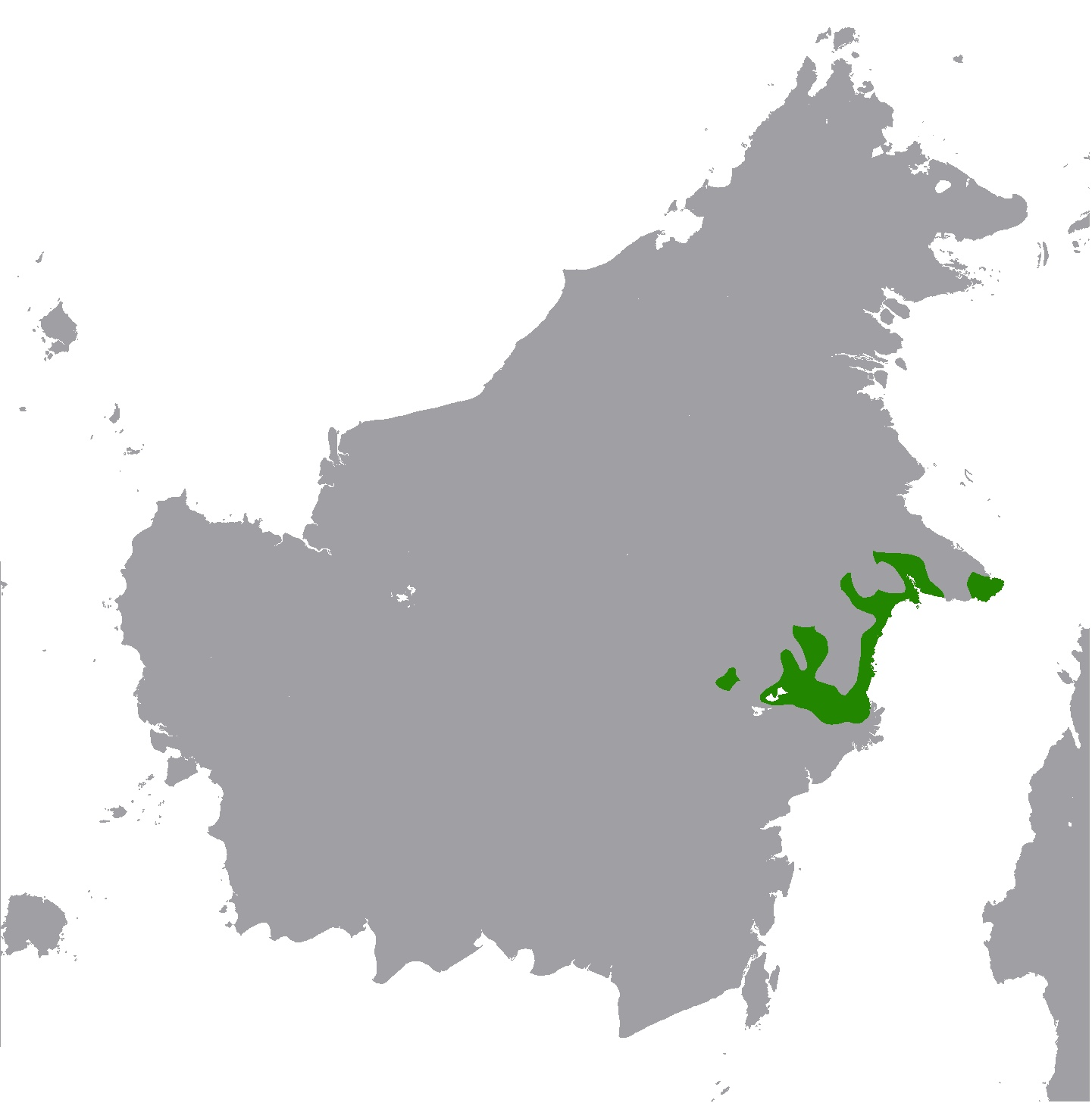

Kutai or Kutainese is a Malayic language spoken by 300,000 to 500,000 people. It is the native language of the Kutai people, the indigenous ethnic group which lives along the Mahakam River in Borneo, especially in East Kalimantan, Indonesia. They are the principal population in the regencies of West Kutai, Kutai Kartanegara, and East Kutai within East Kalimantan province.

Kutai is part of the local Bornean Malayic languages and is closely related to but distinct from the Banjar language in South Kalimantan, Berau, also spoken in North Kalimantan and to some extent Brunei-Kedayan Malay as well. Kutai forms a dialect continuum between the two varieties and all three share similar phonology and vocabulary with each other.

== Dialects ==
Kutai, as with many Malay varieties on the island, is a dialect continuum. A dialect continuum or dialect chain is a spread of language varieties spoken across some geographical area such that neighbouring varieties differ only slightly, but the differences accumulate over distance so that widely separated varieties are not mutually intelligible. There are three principal dialects of Kutai Malay language; all three have partial mutual intelligibility with each other due to the geographical proximity of these dialects. The three main dialects are Tenggarong (vkt), Kota Bangun (mqg), and Muara Ancalong (currently does not have its own ISO 639-3 code).

Despite being commonly viewed as two dialects of the same language, Glottolog classifies Tenggarong (including Ancalong) and Kota Bangun varieties separately. According to them, Tenggarong Kutai belongs to the Greater Riau-Johoric branch (closer to traditional Malayic languages around South China Sea and the Strait of Malacca), while Kota Bangun Kutai belongs to the East Borneo Malay (closer to Banjarese).

== Phonology ==
=== Consonants ===
Consonants
	Labial	Alveolar	Palatal	Velar	Glottal
Stop	p b	t d	c ɟ	k ɡ	ʔ
Fricative		s			h
Nasal	m	n	ɲ	ŋ	
Lateral		l			
Trill		r			
Semivowel	w	j			

=== Vowels ===
Vowels
	Front	Central	Back
High	i		u
Mid	e	ə	o
Low		a	

- /i/, /u/, /e/ and /o/ have lowered allophones [ɪ], [ʊ], [ɛ] and [ɔ] in final closed syllables.

The phonology of Tenggarong Kutainese is almost completely identical with that of Indonesian. However, the upriver varieties (Kota Bangun) differ from the former by gemination of consonants following */ə/ (and subsequent merger with /a/, similar to Berau Malay): *pərut → parrut ('belly'). This change was followed by the raising of all instances of /a/ following voiced consonants (the results are either /ə/ in Kota Bangun or /e/ in Muara Ancalong). The consonant /l/ is transparent to this process (but not in some dialects), making it similar to what happened in Madurese.

Cognates
Kota Bangun	Indonesian
parrut	perut
berrat	berat
tabbel	tebal
detang	datang
nyehit	menjahit
bile	bila

== Literature ==
Kutai for most of its history is mainly a spoken language and is mostly used as a form of poetry (pantun). During the period of the Kutai Kartanegara Sultanate, most literature was written in Standard Malay in Jawi script instead of Kutai Malay.
