= East Kalimantan =

Province in Kalimantan, Indonesia

East Kalimantan Kalimantan Timur
- Province
- Province of East Kalimantan; Provinsi Kalimantan Timur
- Coat of arms
- Nickname: Benua Etam (Kutainese) "Our land"
- Motto: Ruhui Rahayu (Banjar) "Perfect harmony by the blessings of God"
- East Kalimantan in Indonesia
- Interactive map of East Kalimantan
- Coordinates: 1°3′N 116°19′E
- Country: Indonesia
- Region: Kalimantan (Western Indonesia)
- Established: 26 November 1956
- Capital and largest city: Samarinda

Government
  - Body: East Kalimantan Provincial Government
  - Governor: Rudy Mas'ud (Golkar)
  - Vice Governor: Seno Aji
  - Legislature: East Kalimantan Regional House of Representatives (DPRD)

Area
  - Total: 127,346.92 km^{2} (49,168.92 sq mi)
  - Rank: 3rd in Indonesia

Population (mid 2025 estimate)
  - Total: 4,267,600
  - Density: 33.512/km^{2} (86.795/sq mi)

Demographics
  - Ethnic groups: 29.55% Javanese; 18.26% Buginese; 13.94% Banjarese; 9.91% Dayak; 9.21% Kutai
  - Languages: Indonesian (official); Banjarese, Buginese, Dayak, Kutai Malay, Kenyah (regional)
- Time zone: WITA (UTC+8)
- Regional code: 64
- GDP (nominal): 2022
- Total: Rp 921.3 trillion (7th); US$ 62.1 billion Int$ 193.6 billion (PPP)
- Per capita: Rp 238.7 million (2nd); US$ 16,075; Int$ 50,162 (PPP)
- Growth: ▲4.48%
- HDI (2024): ▲0.788 (4th) – high
- Website: kaltimprov.go.id

East Kalimantan (Indonesian: Kalimantan Timur; Jawi: کالیمانتان تيمور; abbreviated as Kaltim) is a province of Indonesia. Its territory comprises the eastern portion of Borneo/Kalimantan. It had a population of about 3.03 million at the 2010 census (within the present boundary), and 3.766 million at the 2020 census; the official estimate in mid-2025 was 4,267,600. Its capital is Samarinda, the most populous city on the entire island of Borneo.

East Kalimantan has a total area of 127,346.92 square kilometres (49,168.92 sq mi) and is the third least densely populated province in Kalimantan (after North Kalimantan and Central Kalimantan). The majority of the region shares a maritime border to the east with West Sulawesi and Central Sulawesi; its Cape Mangkalihat separates the Makassar Strait from the Celebes Sea. Its former northernmost region was split off on 25 October 2012 and is now the separate province of North Kalimantan; meanwhile it still shares land border to the west with West Kalimantan and Central Kalimantan; to its south, East Kalimantan borders South Kalimantan. The province bordered Sabah, Malaysia before the creation of North Kalimantan, and still has a short border with Sarawak, Malaysia through Mahakam Ulu Regency.

Since 11 January 2013, East Kalimantan has been divided into seven regencies and three cities. The proposed capital city of Indonesia, Nusantara, is currently constructed entirely within the province.

== History ==
=== Prehistory ===
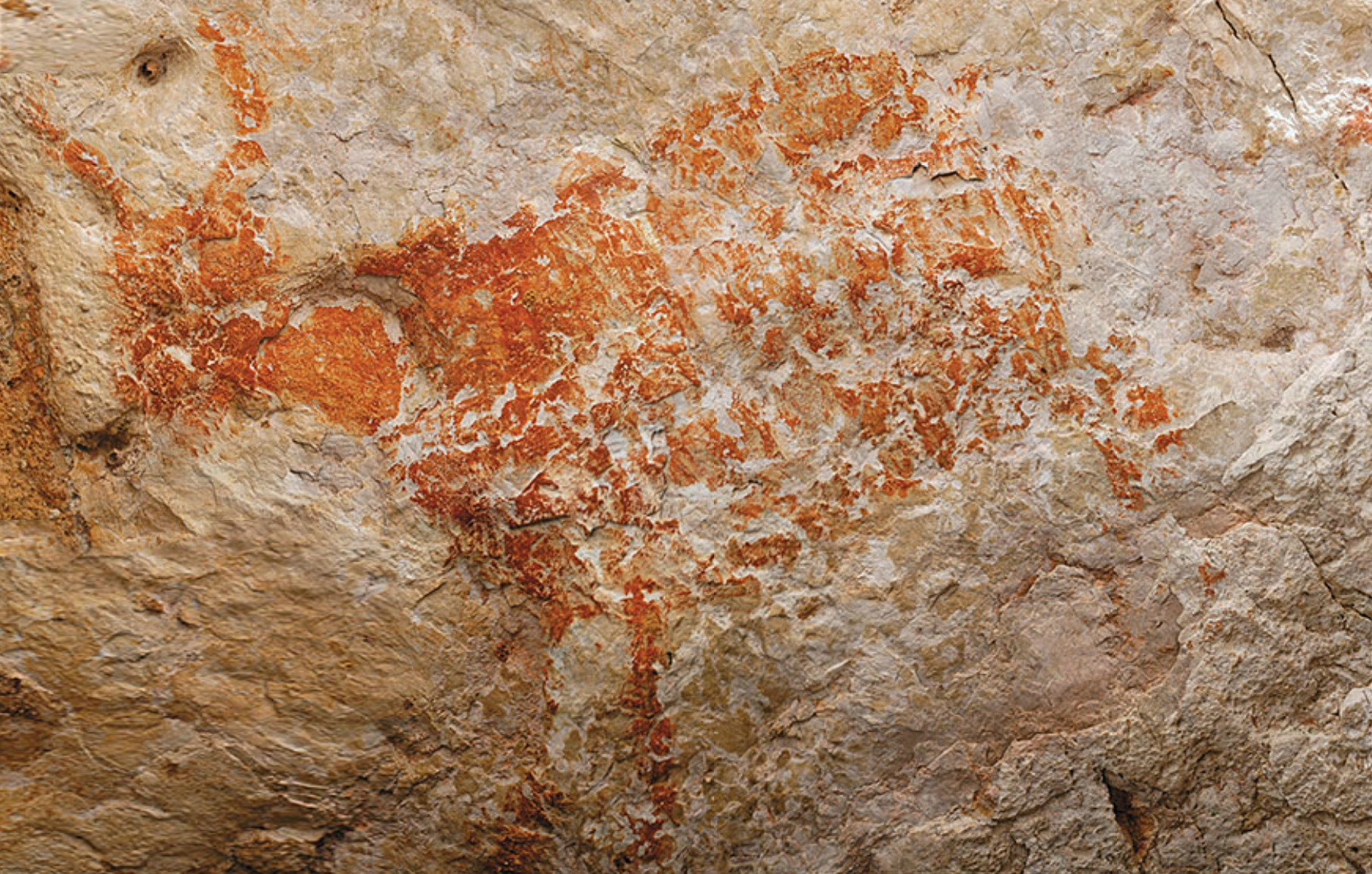
One of the oldest known figurative paintings, a depiction of a bull, was discovered in the Lubang Jeriji Saléh cave dated as over 40,000 (perhaps as old as 52,000) years old.

East Kalimantan was once mostly covered by tropical rainforest. In prehistoric times, there was limestone cave called Lubang Jeriji Saléh located in the Sangkulirang-Mangkalihat Karst in the district of Bengalon, East Kutai, believed to contain one of the oldest figurative art in the world. The cave paintings were first spotted in 1994 by the French explorer Luc-Henri Fage and the French archaeologist Jean-Michel Chazine, from Kalimanthrope. In 2018, a team of scientists investigating the cave, led by Maxime Aubert from Griffith University and Pindi Setiawan from the Bandung Institute of Technology, published a report in the journal Nature identifying the paintings as the world's oldest known figurative art. The team had previously investigated cave paintings in the neighbouring island of Sulawesi. In order to date the paintings, the team used dating techniques on the calcium carbonate (limestone) deposits close to them.

=== 4th to 17th centuries ===
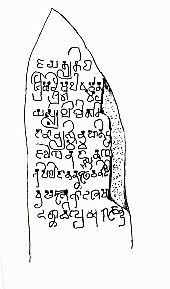
The ancient Yūpa inscription of Mulavarman, king of Kutai Martadipura dating back to the 4th century CE discovered in present Muara Kaman area, Kutai Kartanegara Regency

East Kalimantan has been home to several kingdoms, such as the first and oldest Hindu kingdom of Indonesia, the Kingdom of Kutai Martadipura founded in the 4th century CE. It was succeeded by the Sultanate of Kutai ing Martadipura in the 14th century. Other kingdoms were also located in East Kalimantan, such as the Sultanate of Pasir. East Kalimantan region includes Pasir, Kutai, Berau and also Karasikan (Buranun / pre-Sultanate of Sulu) claimed as conquered territory Suryanata Maharaja, the governor of Majapahit in the State Dipa, located in the Great Temple in Amuntai, until 1620 in the Sultanate of Banjar. However, in the Chinese History Annals, Ming shi 明史, at 1417, some parts of the eastern Kalimantan were recorded as a kingdom under the rule of the Philippine kingdom of then Hindu Sulu, as Kalimantan was ruled by a Sulu monarch named Mahalatu Gelamading (Maharaja Klainbantangan) whose title, Klainbantangan, in Chinese rendering, was named after his territory Kalimantan. At this point in time, Sulu had rebelled against Majapahit rule and had invaded Northeast and East Borneo all the way to the territory of Kalimantan. Between the years 1620–1624, kingdoms in East Kalimantan fell under the influence of the Sultanate of Sultan Alauddin Makassar, before the Bungaya agreement. According to the Hikayat Banjar, the Sultan of Makassar never borrowed land for trade covers an area east and southeast of Borneo to the Sultan Mustain Billah of Banjar when Kiai Martasura sent to Makassar and entered into an agreement with the Sultan Tallo I Mangngadaccinna Daeng I Ba'le 'Sultan Mahmud Karaeng Pattingalloang, who became Mangkubumi and principal advisor to the Sultan Muhammad Said, king of Gowa in 1638–1654 and also in-law of Sultan Hasanuddin, who established the East Kalimantan region as a place to trade for the Sultanate of Makassar (Gowa-Tallo); since then people began to arrive from South Sulawesi. However, based on the agreement between the Sultanate of Banjar and the Dutch East India Company (VOC) in 1635, VOC helped Banjar restore lands in East Kalimantan to the sphere of influence of the Sultanate of Banjar. It was set out in the Bungaya agreement that the Sultanate of Makassar was not allowed to trade up to the east and the north Borneo.

=== 19th to 20th centuries ===
The map of East Kalimantan before 2012, featuring 14 regencies and cities. This map since then still oversees occasional usage, even though it has become outdated for more than a decade.

In accordance with treaties, on 1 January 1817, Sultan Sulaiman of Banjar handed East Kalimantan, Central Kalimantan, part of West and South Kalimantan (including Banjarmasin) over to the Dutch East Indies. On 4 May 1826, Sultan Adam al-wathiq Billah of Banjar reaffirmed the handover of these territories to the Dutch East Indies colonial administration. In 1846, the Dutch began to put a Resident Assistant in East Borneo at Samarinda (now the province of East Kalimantan and the eastern part of South Kalimantan) named H. Von Dewall. Like all other Indonesian provinces, East Kalimantan was then part of the Dutch East Indies.

East Kalimantan with its then administrative area was established based on the Law No. 25 of 1956, originally only consisted of three regency-level special regions: Berau, Bulongan, and Kutai; and the first governor was APT Pranoto. Three years later in 1959, it oversaw the annexation of Pasir Regency from South Kalimantan into the province, removal of special statuses of other regencies, and creation of Balikpapan and Samarinda as separate municipal cities. Since late 1990s, the number of regencies and cities in East Kalimantan had steadily increased into 14 (with the last creation prior the creation of North Kalimantan, was being Tana Tidung Regency in 2007).

=== Splitting off North Kalimantan province ===
North Kalimantan was formally inaugurated as the 34th province of Indonesia on 15 April 2013. The new province was previously part of East Kalimantan Province.

=== New national capital ===
The province will host the future capital city of Indonesia that will be built on parts of Penajam North Paser and Kutai Kartanegara Regency. The future capital is to be named Nusantara, with construction originally projected to start in 2020, and intended to conclude in 2024. However, at a hearing before Committee V of Indonesia's House of Representatives on 9 June 2020, a government representative asserted that the government had not allocated the 2022 budget for the project (for 2022, the ministry proposed a budget worth over 100.46 trillion rupiah - over 7 billion US$ - a steep reduction from the figure of 149.81 trillion rupiah in 2021). Earlier, the National Planning Development Authority had said that the total sum needed to move the capital from its current location in Jakarta to East Kalimantan province amounted to 486 trillion rupiah, of which 265.2 trillion will be mobilised through the public-private partnership (PPP), 127.3 trillion from private special funds, and 93.5 trillion from the state budget. But the Ministry of Finance said that the government switched its priorities to mitigating the effect of the COVID-19 pandemic. The ministry announced that it had not allocated budget for the new capital project. Nevertheless, the new national capital was formally inaugurated in August 2024.

== Geography ==
East Kalimantan Province comprises a land area of 125,336.81 square kilometers and a comprehensive ocean management area of 25,656 km^{2}, located between 113°44'E and 119°00'E, and between 2°33'N and 2°25'S. The province is divided into seven regencies (kabupaten) and three cities (kota), together subdivided into 105 districts (kecamatan) and then into 1,026 villages (rural desa and urban kelurahan). The regencies (with their administrative capitals) and cities are enumerated below. East Kalimantan is one of the main gates to the eastern part of Indonesia. The area is also known as a storehouse of timber and mining, has hundreds of rivers (scattered across almost all regencies and cities) which area the main means of transportation in addition to land transport, with the longest river being the Mahakam.

East Kalimantan borders North Kalimantan in the north, South Kalimantan in the south, Central Kalimantan in the southwest, and West Kalimantan and Sarawak in the west. It touches the Celebes Sea and the Makassar Strait in the east, with its large Mangkalihat Peninsula separating the two. There are hills in almost all districts, and there are numerous lakes. Most lakes are located in the Kutai Regency, with the most extensive lakes, Semayang and Melintang, having an area of 13,000 ha and 11,000 ha respectively.

=== Climate ===
Such as the climate of Indonesia in general, East Kalimantan tropical climate and has two seasons, dry and rainy seasons. The dry season usually occurs in May to October, while the rainy season in November to April. This situation continued every year interspersed with transitional season in certain months. Moreover, because of its location on the equator, the climate in East Kalimantan are also affected by wind monsoon, monsoon wind is November–April west and east monsoon winds from May to October. In recent years, the situation in East Kalimantan season is sometimes erratic. In the months that it is supposed to rain, there is no rain at all, or vice versa in the months that should be dry it rains for a much longer time.

==== Temperature and humidity ====
Temperatures somewhere high and low are determined by the area of the ocean surface and the distance from the beach. In general, East Kalimantan hot climates with temperatures in 2013 ranged from 21.6 °C in Berau October to 35.6 °C in Berau in September. Aside from being a tropical area with extensive forests, in 2013 the average humidity between 83 and 87 percent of East Kalimantan. The lowest air humidity observed by the meteorological station Samarinda happens in a few months with 82 percent humidity. While the highest occurred in Berau in February with 91 percent humidity.

==== Rainfall and wind conditions ====
Rainfall in East Kalimantan region varies by month and location of monitoring stations. Average highest rainfall recorded at the Meteorological Station Berau amounted to 245.1 mm and the lowest for the year 2013 was recorded at the Meteorological Station Samarinda is 237.8 mm. At some monitoring stations monitor wind conditions in East Kalimantan in 2013. Observations show that wind speeds between 3 and 4 knots. The highest wind speed was 4 knots in Balikpapan and Berau, while the lowest was 3 knots in Samarinda.

== Government and administrative divisions ==
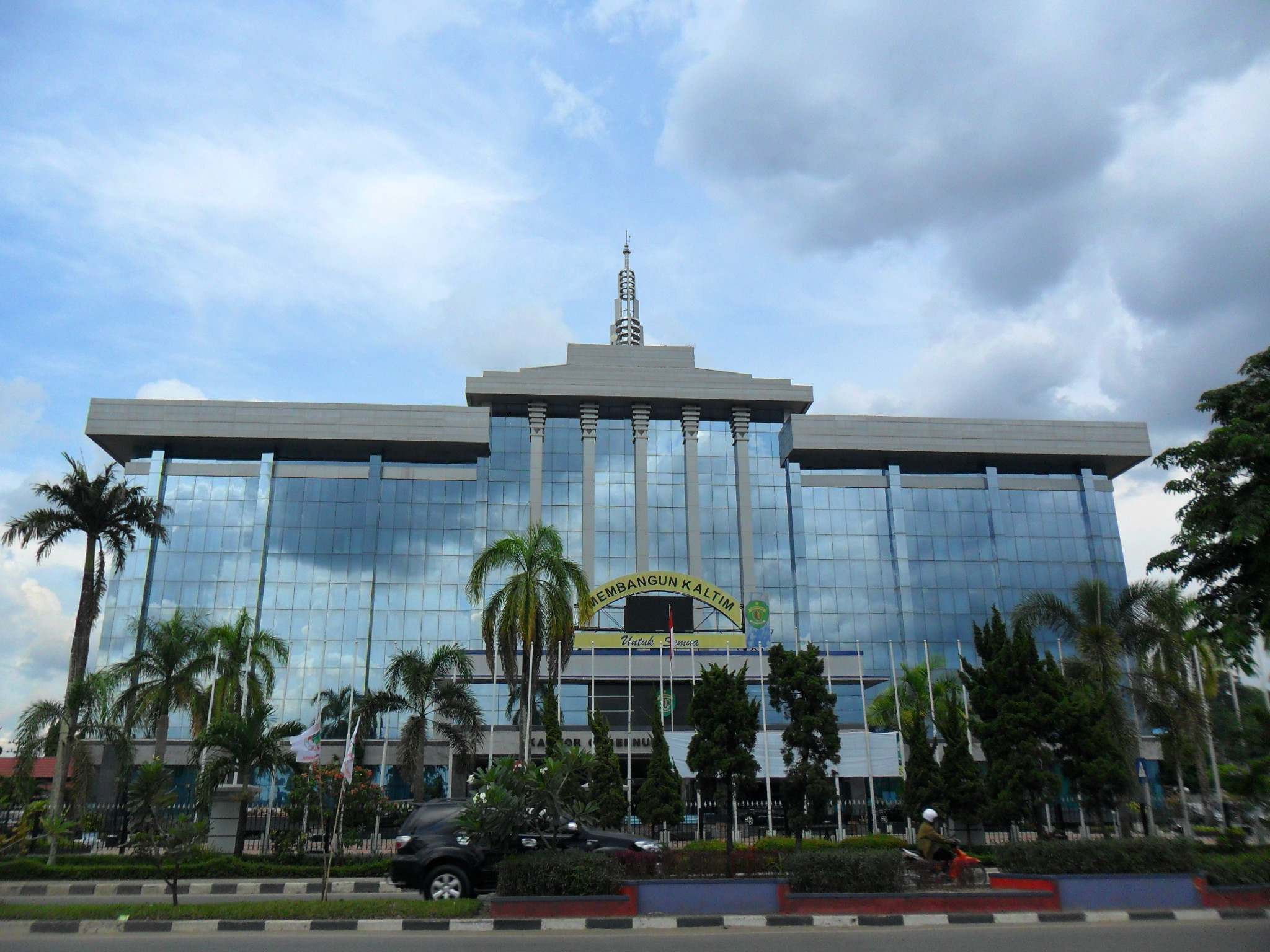
East Kalimantan Governor Office

=== Administrative divisions ===
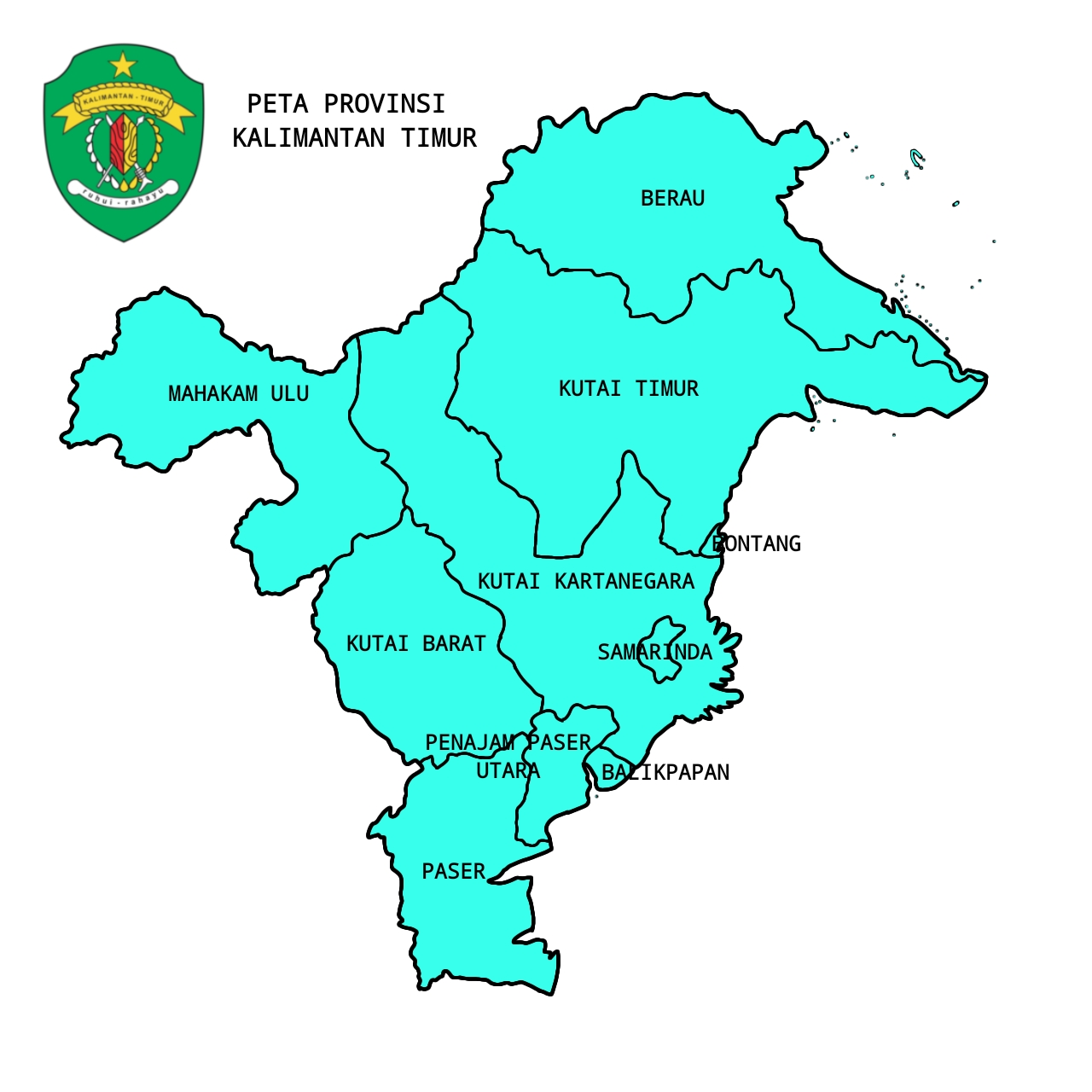
Map of regencies and cities

East Kalimantan consists of 7 regencies and 3 cities, in turn divided into 105 districts.

Regional code	City or regency name	Area (km^{2})	Population				Capital	HDI 2019	Location map	Establishment date
Regional code	City or regency name	Area (km^{2})	2010	2015	2020	2025	Capital	HDI 2019	Location map	Establishment date
64.01	Paser	11,603.94	230,316	261,736	275,452	289,750	Tanah Grogot	0.723 (High)		26-06-1959
64.02	Kutai Kartanegara	27,263.10	626,680	716,319	729,382	845,620	Tenggarong	0.738 (High)		26-06-1959 (Note: continues Kutai Self-Government and the Special Region of Kutai (established on 07-01-1953))
64.03	Berau	36,962.37	179,079	208,394	248,035	265,300	Tanjung Redeb	0.749 (High)		26-06-1959 (Note: continues Berau District (kewedanan) and the Special Region of Berau (established on 07-01-1953))
64.07	West Kutai (Kutai Barat)	20,384.60	165,934	145,728	172,288	180,300	Sendawar	0.716 (High)		04-10-1999
64.08	East Kutai (Kutai Timur)	31,239.84	255,637	318,950	434,459	470,400	Sangatta	0.735 (High)		04-10-1999
64.09	Penajam North Paser (Penajam Paser Utara)	3,333.06	142,922	154,020	178,681	400,030	Penajam	0.716 (High)		10-04-2002
64.12	Mahakam Ulu	18,427.81		25,946	32,513	34,740	Ujoh Bilang	0.676 (Medium)		11-01-2013
64.71	Balikpapan	511.01	557,579	614,663	688,318	725,440	Balikpapan	0.801 (Very High)		26-06-1959
64.72	Samarinda	718.00	727,500	811,314	827,994	865,310	Samarinda	0.802 (Very High)		26-06-1959
64.74	Bontang	161.88	143,683	165,606	178,917	190,710	Bontang	0.801 (Very High)		04-10-1999
	Totals	127,346.92	3,028,487	3,422,676	3,766,039	4,267,600	Samarinda	0.766 (High)		26-11-1956

== Ecology ==
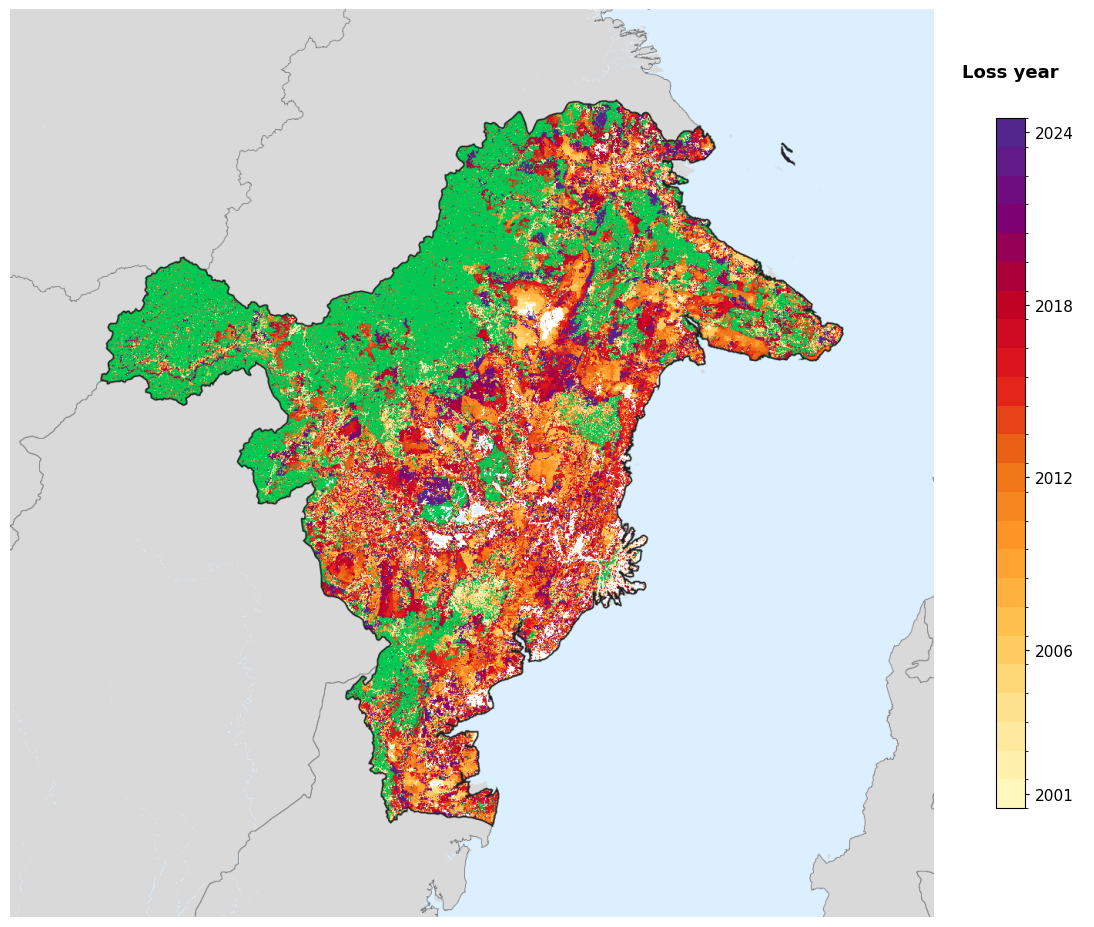
Tree-cover loss year in East Kalimantan, 2001-2024, from the Global Forest Change dataset.

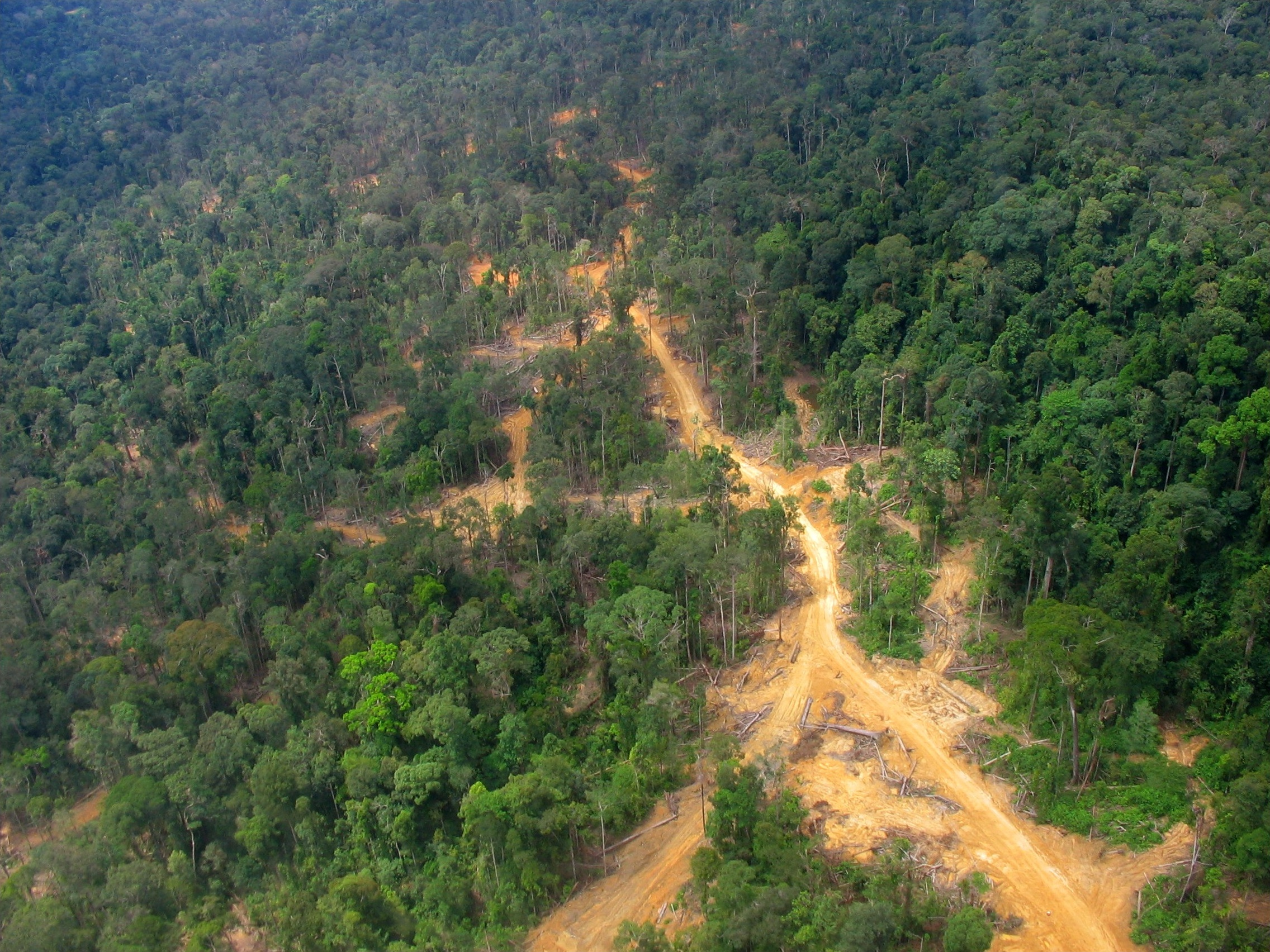
Logging road in East Kalimantan: logged forest on the left, primary forest on the right

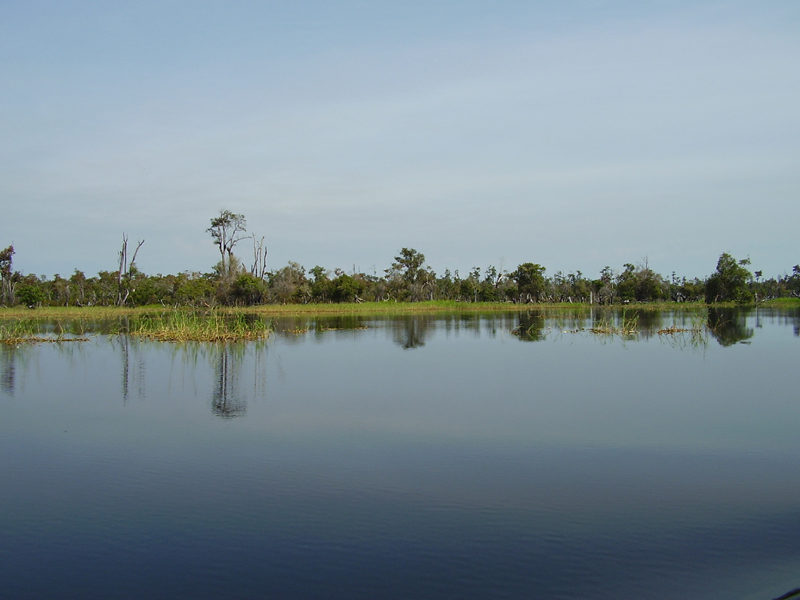
Melintan Lake in Kutai Kartanegara Regency

Illegal logging has removed much of the original forests of the province. Less than half the original forest remains in places such as the Kayan Mentarang and the Kutai national parks.

The projects that supports tropical rainforest conservation includes a WWF project and Samboja Lestari lodge, one of Borneo Orangutan Survival Foundation's reforestation and orangutan rehabilitation projects.

== Economy ==
East Kalimantan GDP share by sector (2022)
1. Agriculture (7.04%)
2. Manufacturing (15.1%)
3. Other Industrial (7.79%)
4. Mining and Quarrying (53.2%)
5. Service (16.9%)

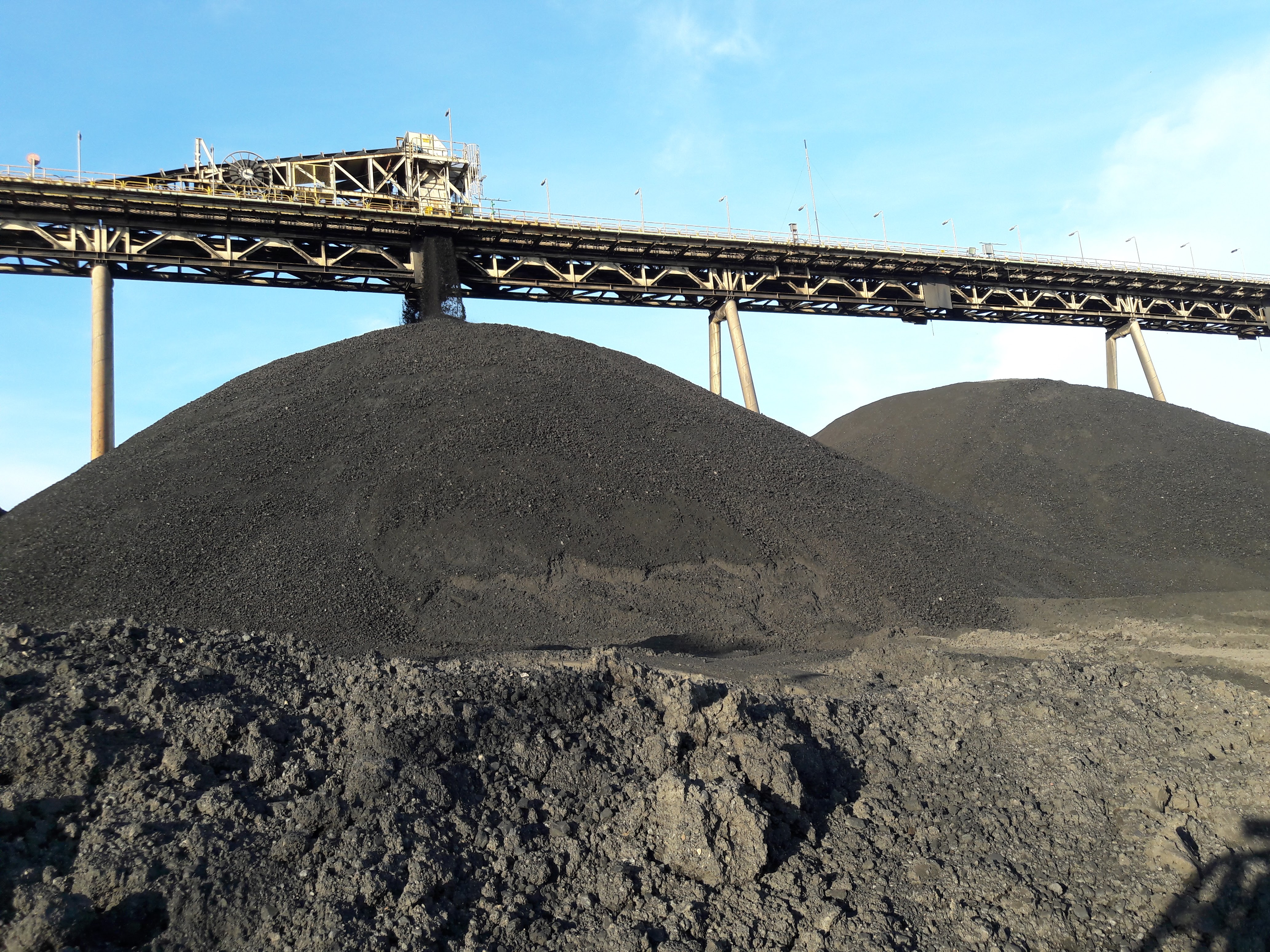
Economy of East Kalimantan is very dependent on Petroleum and Mining, especially in Coal.

East Kalimantan's economy heavily depends on earth resources such as oilfield exploration, natural gas, coal and gold. Balikpapan has an oil refinery plant that was built by Dutch governance before World War II, destroyed during World War II, and rebuilt after Indonesian independence.

Other developing economic sectors include agriculture and tourism.

Obstacles to economic development include a lack of transportation infrastructure. Transportation depends on traditional boats connecting coastal cities and areas along main river, Mahakam River.

In 2012, Russia's state railway firm Joint Stock Company (JSC) signed a memorandum of understanding with the East Kalimantan governor over railway lines to transport coal and other freight. The first stage will connect an area near Balikpapan port to West Kutai Regency in a 183-kilometer line and is estimated to cost about $1.8 billion. It will commence in 2013 and by 2017 it is hoped that it carry 20 million tons of coal annually. The second phase will connect a line to Murung Raya in Central Kalimantan with a 60 kilometer line, which will cost an estimated $600 million.

Several oil fields have been discovered in the Mahakam River Delta including Attaka, Badak (1971), Semberah, Nilam, Sanga Sanga, Bekapai (1972), Handil (1974), Samboja, Jakin and Sepinggan. The Handil, Badak and Bekapai fields are anticline structural traps with oil reservoir sandstones between 450 and 2900 m. The delta is in the Kutai basin, bounded by the Mankalihat and Paternoster carbonate arch, containing Eocene shales overlain by Oligocene fluvial deposits during marine regression, culminating in the formation of the delta in the late Miocene.

== Demographics ==
Historical population
Year	Pop.	±%
1971	733,797	—
1980	1,218,016	+66.0%
1990	1,876,663	+54.1%
1995	2,314,183	+23.3%
2000	2,451,895	+6.0%
2010	3,550,586	+44.8%
2015	3,422,676	−3.6%
2020	3,766,039	+10.0%
2025	4,267,600	+13.3%
Source: Badan Pusat Statistik 2025 and previous. These figures before 2015 include the population of the city and four northerly regencies split off in that year to form the new North Kalimantan Province; subsequent figures exclude them.

Within the current boundary, East Kalimantan was populated by 3,028,487 people as of 2010. In mid 2025 it was officially estimated to have 4,267,600 inhabitants.

=== Ethnicity ===
Ethnicities of East Kalimantan – 2010 Census
Ethnic group	Percentage
Javanese	29.55%
Bugis	18.26%
Banjar	13.94%
Dayak	9.91%
Kutai	9.21%
Sundanese	1.59%
Madurese	1.24%
Chinese	1.16%
Toraja	1.16%
Others	13.18%

East Kalimantan is a major destination of migrants from Jawa, Sulawesi and South Kalimantan.With population of approximately 3.859 million, and area of 127,347 km^{2}, the province is considered sparsely populated.

Ethnic groups in East Kalimantan in order of population at 2010 census
No.	Group	%	Notes
1	Javanese	29.55%	Spread in almost all regions, especially the transmigration areas to urban areas
2	Bugis	18.26%	Occupy many coastal areas and urban areas.
3	Banjar	13.94%	Quite dominant in the city of Samarinda and Balikpapan.
4	Dayak	9.91%	Occupy the interior part of the province.
5	Kutai	9.21%	Inhabit Kutai Kartanegara, East Kutai and West Kutai
6	Paser	1.89%	
7	Sunda	1.59%	
8	Buton	1.25%	
9	Madura	1.24%	
10	Toraja	1.16%	

The rest are other groups from various regions in Indonesia.

=== Language ===
People in East Kalimantan generally use Indonesian for official purposes and Banjarese for inter-ethnic communication. Due to the large number of Banjarese people in the province, their language became the main lingua franca, especially in cities like Samarinda and Balikpapan. Besides Banjarese, there is a significant presence of Javanese and Buginese speakers as well, due to the large migration of Javanese and Buginese people into the region.

Other languages spoken in East Kalimantan are Kutai Malay (a distinct Malay variety closely related but distinct from Banjarese), Paser (a Northeast Barito language), Berau Malay, Tunjung, Bahau, Modang Lundayeh and more others. However, Kutai, Paser, and Kenyah languages are considered under the threat of extinction.

=== Religion ===
Religion in East Kalimantan (2022)
1. Islam (87.4%)
2. Protestantism (7.49%)
3. Roman Catholic (4.44%)
4. Buddhism (0.39%)
5. Hinduism (0.22%)
6. Confucianism (0.01%)
7. Folk religion (0.01%)

According to the 2021 estimates, 3,320,000 people are Muslims, 286,150 are Protestants, 168,140 are Roman Catholics, 15,630 are Buddhists, 8,500 are Hindus and 308 are Confucians or adhere to folk religions.

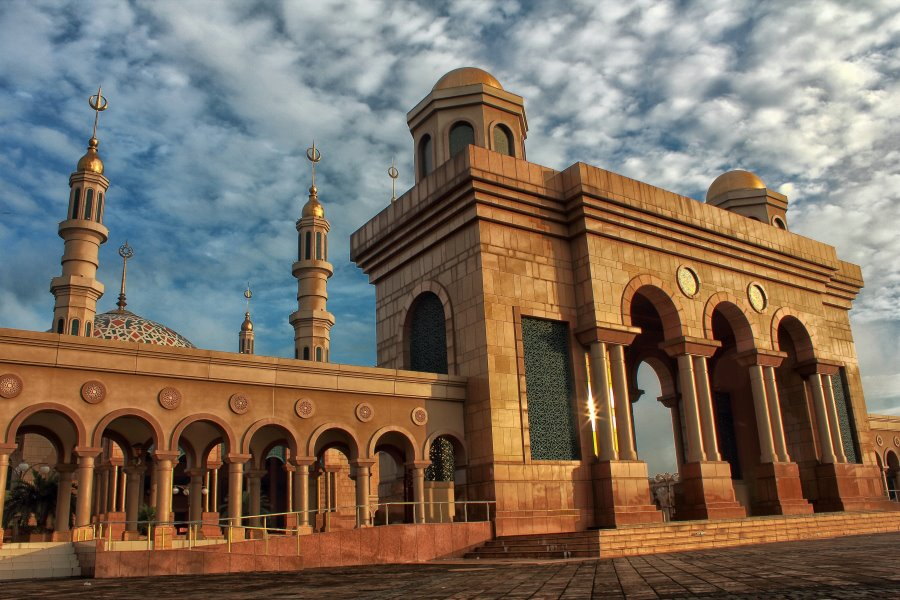
Islamic Centre Samarinda

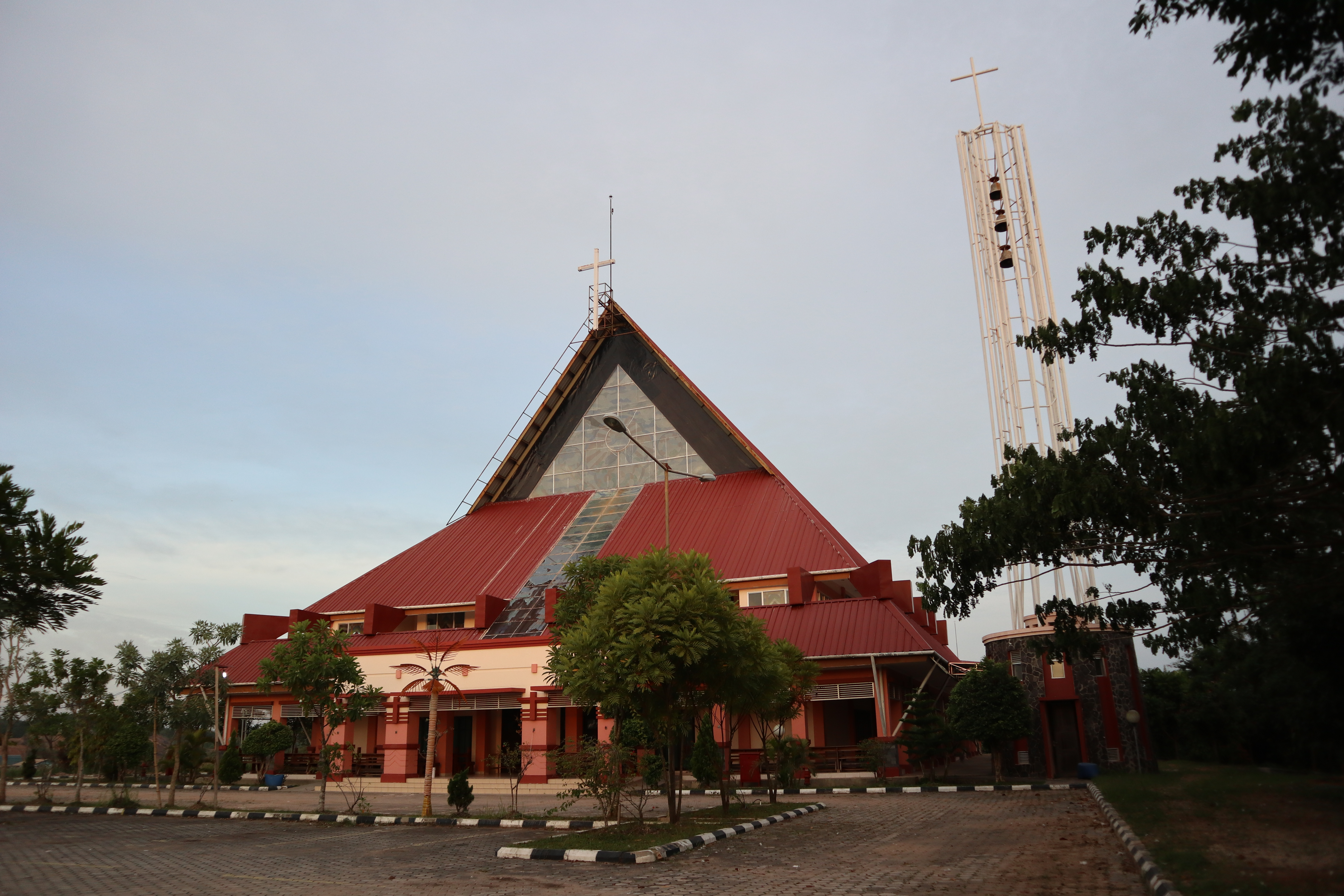
Sangatta Catholic Church

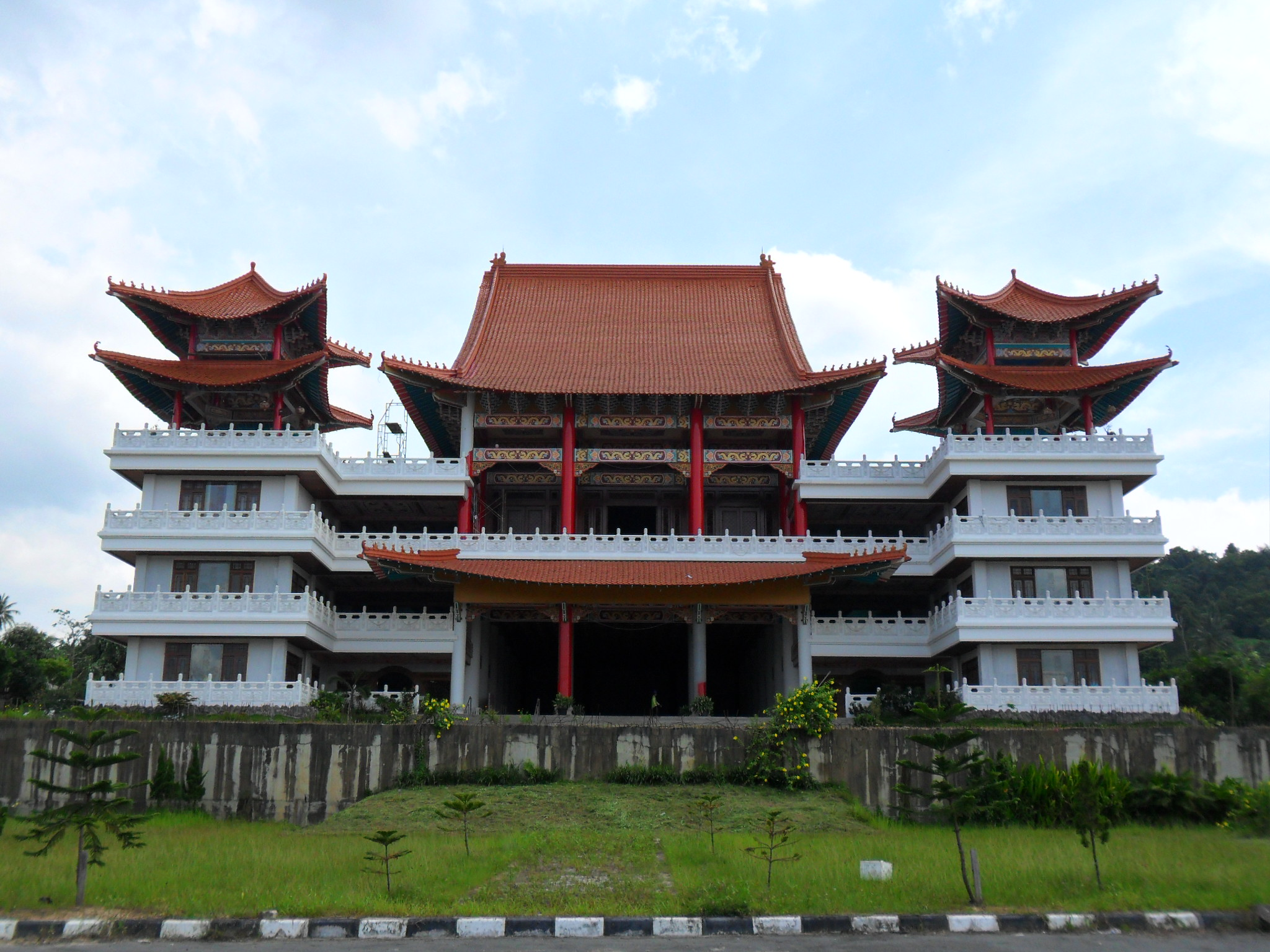
Eka Dharma Manggala Buddhist temple

== Art and culture ==
=== Traditional clothing ===
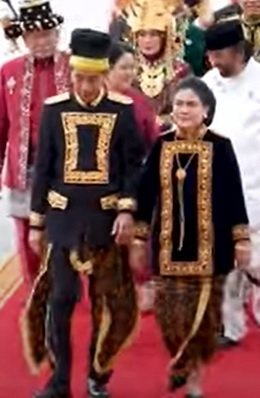
Kustim or kustin, worn by president Joko Widodo in 2024

There are several types of traditional costume belonging to the ethnic groups of East Kalimantan. The traditional costumes of Kenyah people (Dayak) include sapei sapaq for males, which consists of a vest and tight pants known as abet kaboq, and ta'a for females, which consists of a vest known as sapei inoq and a skirt. Other Dayak traditional garments include bulang kuurung (either short-sleeved or without) and its long-sleeved counterpart lengke, and bulang burai king, traditionally worn during ceremonies or tribal wars.

Meanwhile, the Kutai people have their own costumes, namely kustim / kustin and takwo, formal costume traditionally worn by upper-middle classes and the nobility, and sakai, a garment made from skin or wood fiber, traditionally only worn by women.

=== Traditional dance ===
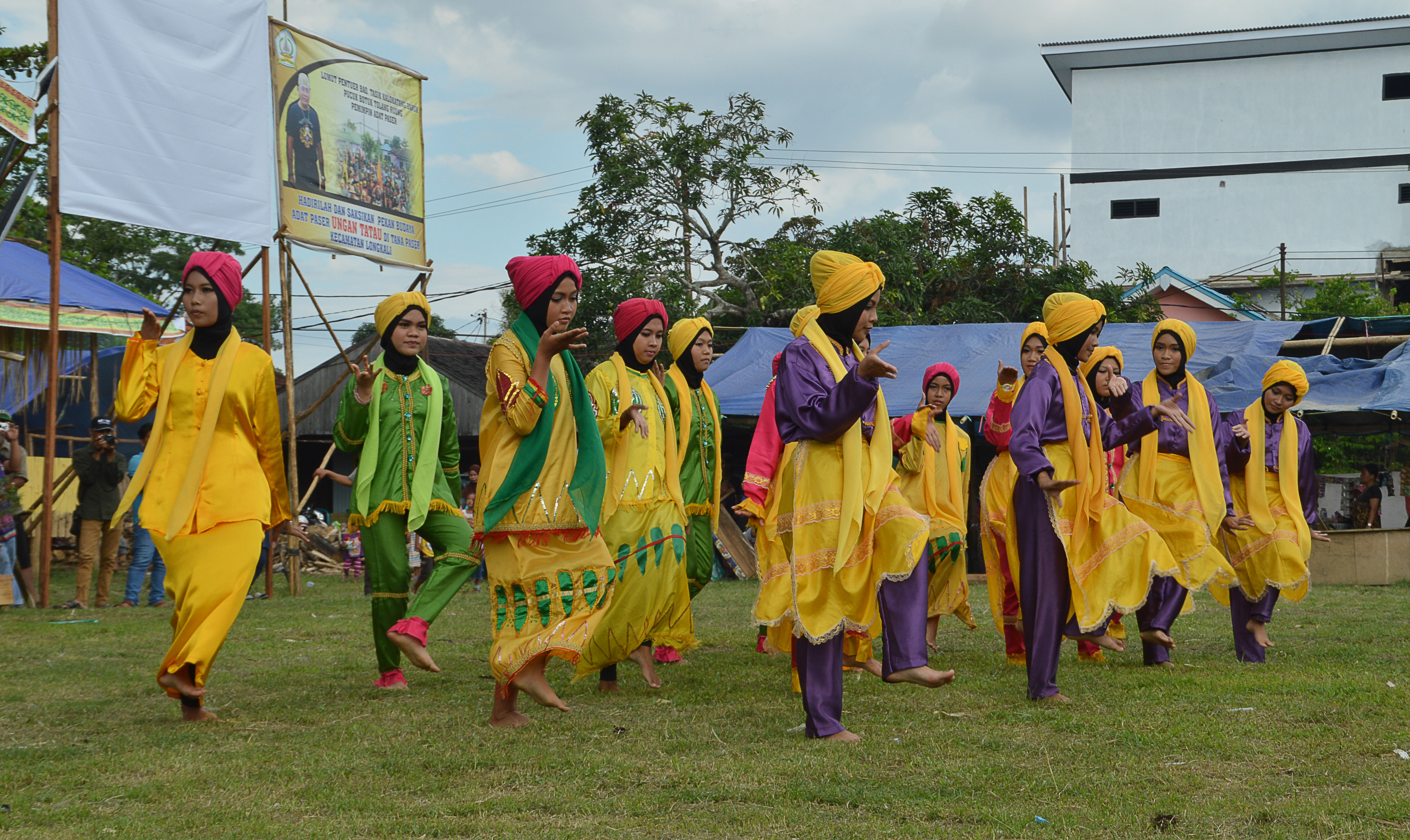
Ronggeng dance from the Paser tribe.

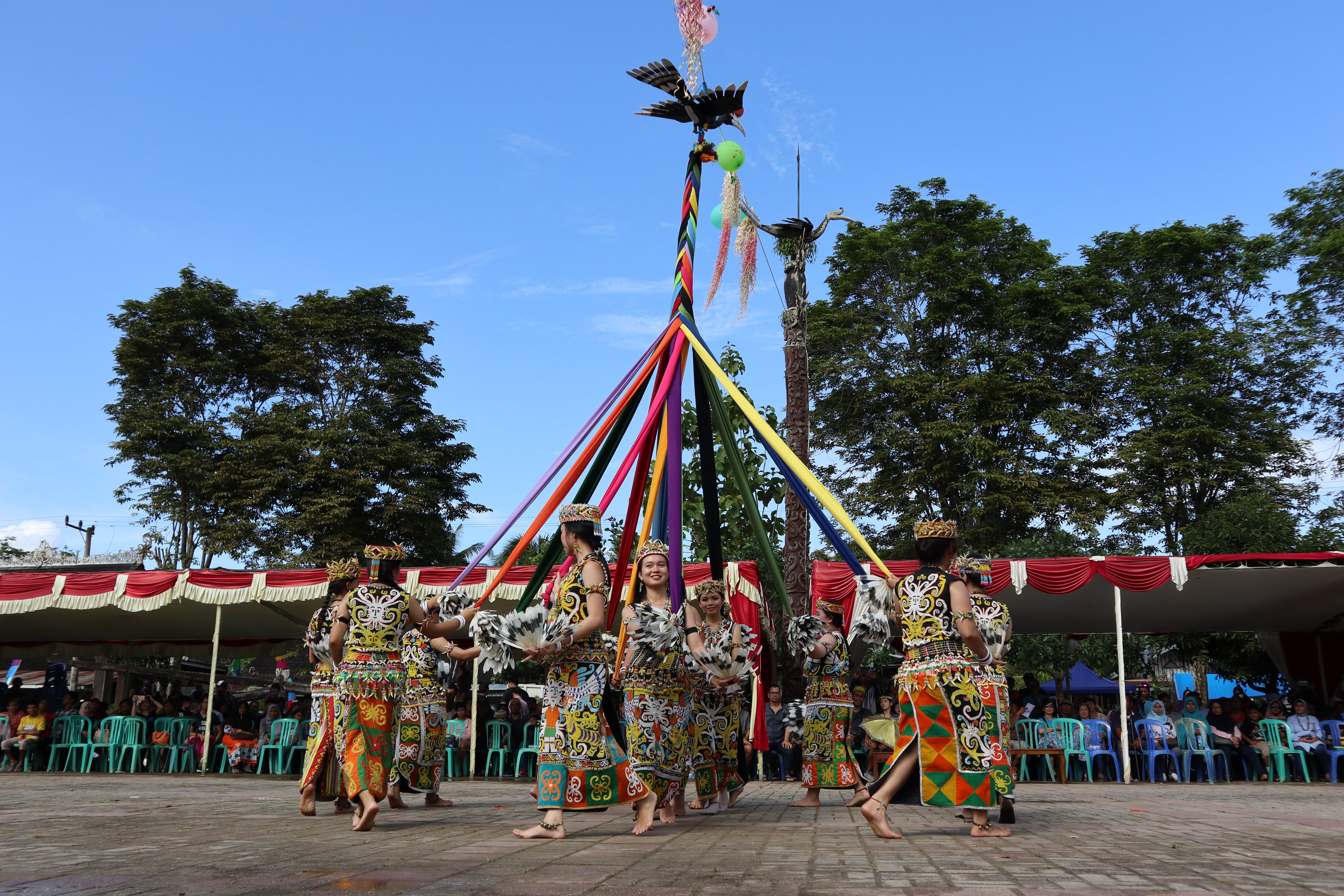
Weaving dance from Dayak Kenyah tribe

East Kalimantan also has a variety of traditional dance. Punan Letto, Datun Ngentau, Hudoq, Ganjur, Gong / Kancet Ledo, Burung Enggang, Gantar, Papatai, Datun Julud, and Leleng came from the Dayak people, while Jepen and Topeng Kemindu came from the Kutai people.
