= Melalan Airport =

Melalan Airport Bandar Udara Melalan
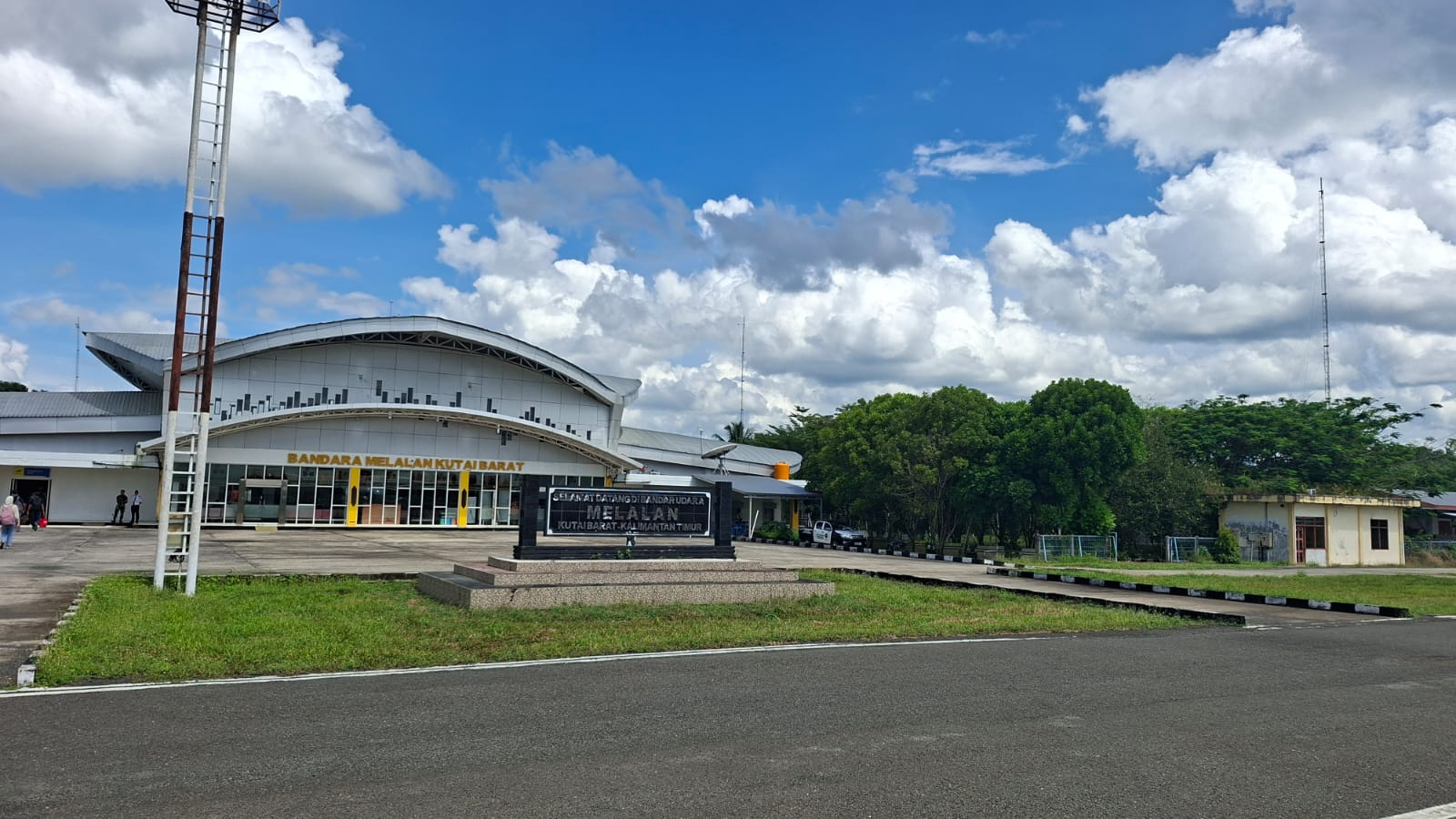
- IATA: GHS; ICAO: WALE

Summary
- Airport type: Public
- Owner: Government of Indonesia
- Operator: Directorate General of Civil Aviation
- Serves: Melak and Sendawar
- Location: Barong Tongkok District, West Kutai Regency, East Kalimantan, Indonesia
- Time zone: WITA (UTC+08:00)
- Elevation AMSL: 101 m (331 ft)
- Coordinates: 00°12′13.56″S 115°45′35.61″E

Map
- Location in Kalimantan

Runways
Direction	Length		Surface
Direction	m	ft	Surface
03/21	1,300	4,265	Asphalt

Statistics (2024)
- Passengers: 23,086 (▲157.1%)
- Cargo (tonnes): 260.68 (▲67.9%)
- Aircraft movements: 1,265 (▲60.9%)
- Source: DGCA

Melalan Airport (IATA: GHS, ICAO: WALE) is a domestic airport serving Melak, a town in West Kutai Regency, East Kalimantan, Indonesia. The airport is located approximately 8 km (5 miles) from Sendawar, the administrative capital of West Kutai Regency, and 5 km (3.1 miles) from Melak town center. It serves as a key gateway to West Kutai Regency and the surrounding areas by air. The airport primarily handles inter-regency routes within East Kalimantan, including flights to Samarinda, the provincial capital, and Balikpapan, both of which are currently served exclusively by Wings Air. It also serves pioneer routes to remote areas of East Kalimantan, including Long Pahangai in Mahakam Ulu Regency, operated by Susi Air. In the past, several other airlines, including Kalstar Aviation, NAM Air and Xpress Air, operated services to Melak, but these routes were subsequently discontinued, while some of the airlines have since ceased operations.

== History ==
=== Pre-war ===
Prior to the outbreak of the Pacific War and the Japanese invasion of the Dutch East Indies, the Dutch colonial government constructed an airfield deep in the interior of Kalimantan, between the town of Longiram and Melak, to prepare for a potential Japanese invasion. The airfield was intended for use by the Royal Netherlands East Indies Army Air Force (ML-KNIL) as a strategic fallback facility should airfields in the coastal areas be disabled or captured by enemy forces. Built as a secret military airfield, it featured two parallel runways and extensive fortifications. Although plans for the airfield had been proposed as early as 1936, construction did not begin until 1940. The airfield became known to Allied forces throughout the war as Samarinda II Airfield.

When the war broke out in late 1941, the airfield was still under construction and had not yet been fully completed. Nevertheless, the Dutch had already prepared various facilities intended to support a modern military airfield, while incorporating defensive systems and strategies inherited from World War I. Several units of the Royal Netherlands East Indies Army (KNIL) were stationed at the airfield, including a KNIL infantry company, an anti-aircraft battery equipped with four 40 mm guns, an anti-aircraft machine-gun platoon (AAMG), a mobile auxiliary first-aid platoon, and a militia detachment comprising five independent squads, with approximately 75 men in total. On the other hand, several ML-KNIL squadrons were based at the airfield. These included the Ie Vliegtuiggroep (1st Group), comprising 1-VI.G.I (Bomber Squadron) with 11 Martin Model 139WH-3 bombers, and the Ve Vliegtuiggroep (5th Group), comprising I-1.VI.G.V (Fighter Squadron) and II-1-VI.G.V (Fighter Squadron), each equipped with four B-339D Brewster Buffalo fighters.

=== World War II ===
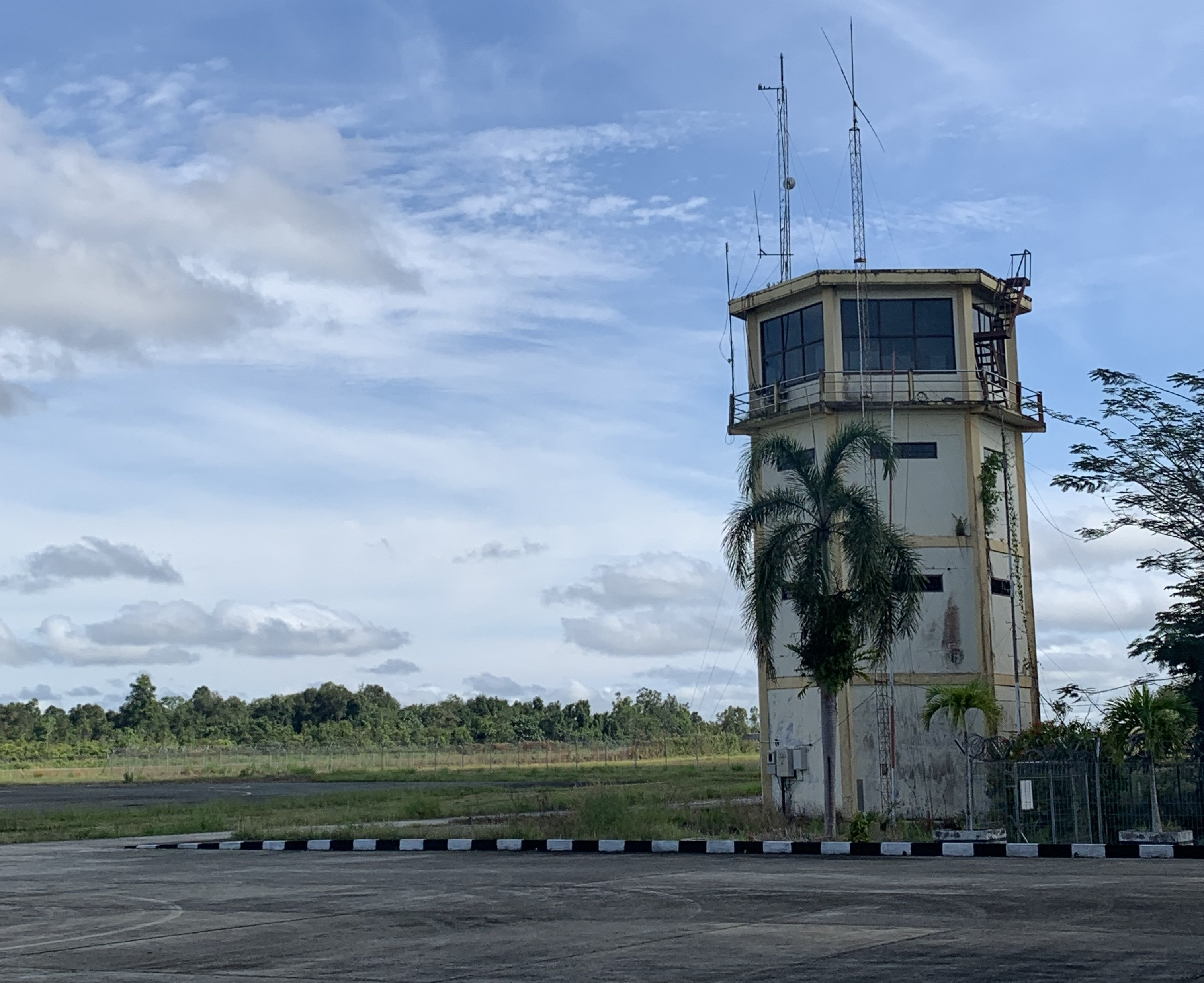
ATC tower

Japanese forces landed on Tarakan in January 1942, marking the beginning of the invasion of the Dutch East Indies. The ML-KNIL immediately launched air operations against Japanese positions using aircraft based at the airfield. The Dutch also bombed Tarakan Airfield, which had recently been captured by the Japanese, in an attempt to prevent them from putting it into operation. However, Japanese engineers quickly repaired the damaged airfield, allowing it to resume operations by 16 January, when aircraft from the 23rd Air Flotilla and the Tinian Air Wing arrived from Jolo.

On 23 January 1942, Japanese forces discovered the secret Samarinda II airfield through aerial reconnaissance. Following several Japanese air attacks, the remaining aircraft of the ML-KNIL were withdrawn from Samarinda II, although the base itself remained operational for the time being. The ML-KNIL command subsequently decided to use Oelin Airfield near Banjarmasin as a base for hit-and-run attacks from Java against Japanese forces at Balikpapan. However, on 27 January 1942, a squadron was caught on the ground by a Japanese air raid and destroyed. A total of nine Glenn Martin bombers were lost in the attack, effectively bringing an end to ML-KNIL operations over Borneo.

With Dutch forces losing ground at Samarinda and Balikpapan, they began withdrawing toward Samarinda II Airfield in early February 1942. Before their retreat, they sabotaged the remaining oil pumps and refineries in the region, then evacuated by land and by boat along the Mahakam River. They were subsequently evacuated to Java. With the situation deteriorating and Japanese forces advancing toward the airfield, the ground commander at Samarinda II received orders from the KNIL Algemeene Krijgshandelingen (AKH, “General Military Operations”) in Java on 8 March 1942 to capitulate the following day without destroying any weapons, equipment, or the runway. On 9 March, the airfield commander flew to Samarinda to formally surrender the installation to the Japanese. The Japanese subsequently arrived at Samarinda II Airfield on 19 March 1942, encountering no resistance as they took control of the airfield.

Afterward, some Dutch personnel attempted to continue the fight from the surrounding jungle, but they were eventually overwhelmed. Many were captured and executed by Japanese forces, while others were betrayed by local Dayak inhabitants. Throughout the remainder of the war, the Japanese did not make regular use of Samarinda II Airfield, instead maintaining only a small infantry detachment to keep one of the runways clear for emergency use. The airfield remained under Japanese occupation until the end of the Pacific War and Japan’s surrender in September 1945.

=== Contemporary history ===
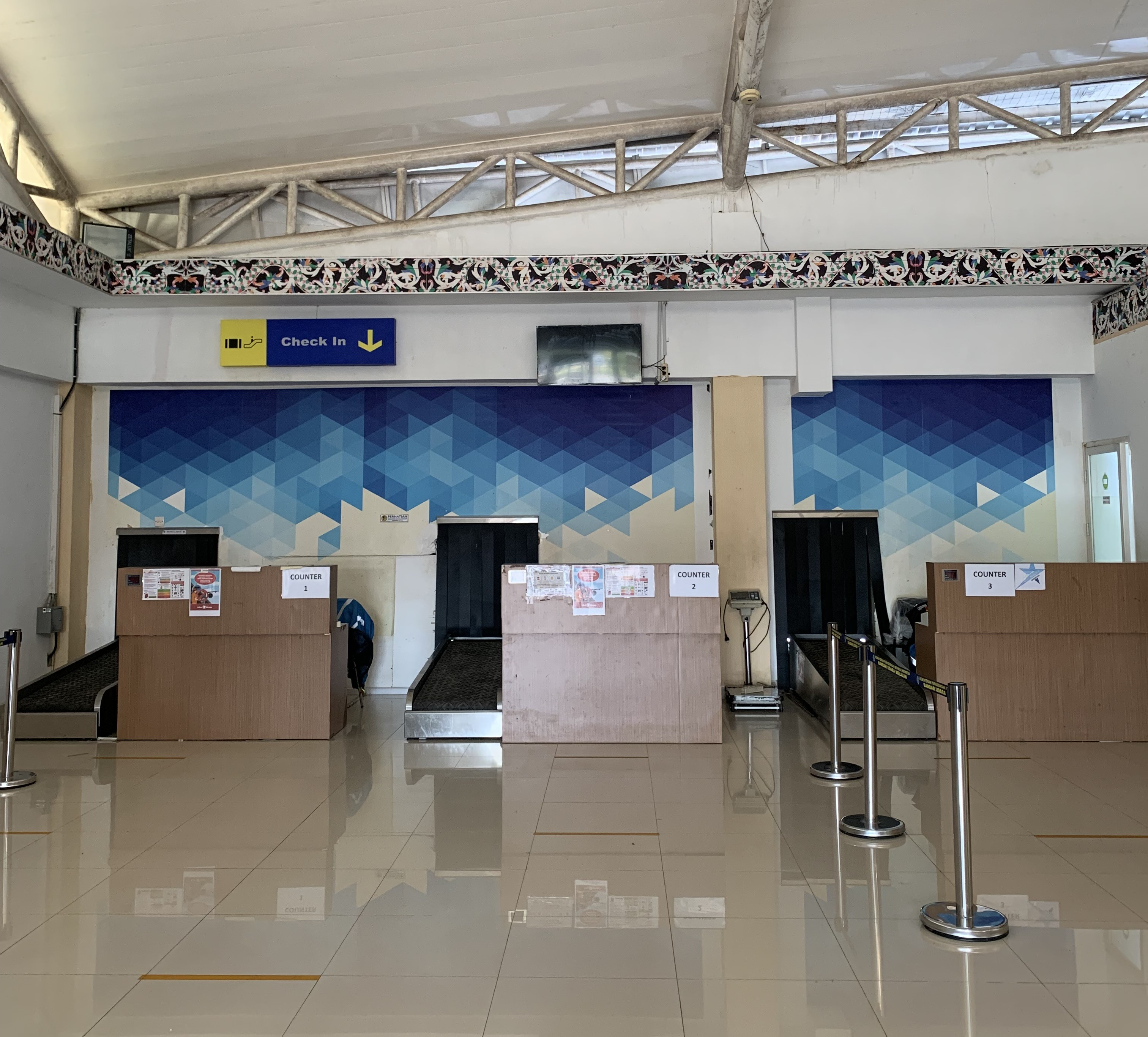
Check-in counters

After the war, the airfield was returned to Dutch control and remained under Dutch military administration until 1949, when the Netherlands recognized Indonesian sovereignty and withdrew from Indonesia. The airfield was subsequently handed over to the Indonesian Air Force. Despite the transfer, it remained largely abandoned throughout the 1950s and 1960s.

When the Indonesia–Malaysia confrontation (Konfrontasi) broke out in 1963, the airfield facilities at Melak were brought back into use as an Indonesian military base due to their strategic location near the Malaysian border. The surviving Dutch-era airport facilities, including stone buildings and ammunition warehouses, were also repurposed as logistical storage facilities known as the PALAD (Pangkalan Angkatan Darat) warehouses. The airfield remained in military use until 1966, when tensions between Indonesia and Malaysia had subsided.

In the early 2000s, the airport was reactivated and began operating regular commercial flights to support the local population's air transportation needs and promote the tourism sector in West Kutai. Initially, it had only basic infrastructure to meet the air transportation needs of the local population and support tourism. As the airport developed and its importance grew, the government began investing in its modernization. Various upgrades were undertaken, including improvements to the runway, expansion of the passenger terminal, and the addition of facilities to enhance aviation safety and security, as well as passenger comfort. The airport's original runway, measuring only 900 m × 23 m and capable of accommodating aircraft such as the CASA C-212 and DHC-6 Twin Otter, was subsequently extended and widened to 1,300 m × 30 m to accommodate larger aircraft, including the ATR 72.

With the resumption of commercial services, the airport began serving routes to other cities, including Balikpapan and Samarinda, operated by several airlines using different types of aircraft. For example, Xpress Air operated ATR 42 flights between Balikpapan and Melak until 2020. The route was subsequently taken over by Wings Air in June 2023. In June 2026, Wings Air introduced a new route to Samarinda, connecting Melak with the provincial capital of East Kalimantan.

== Facilities and development ==
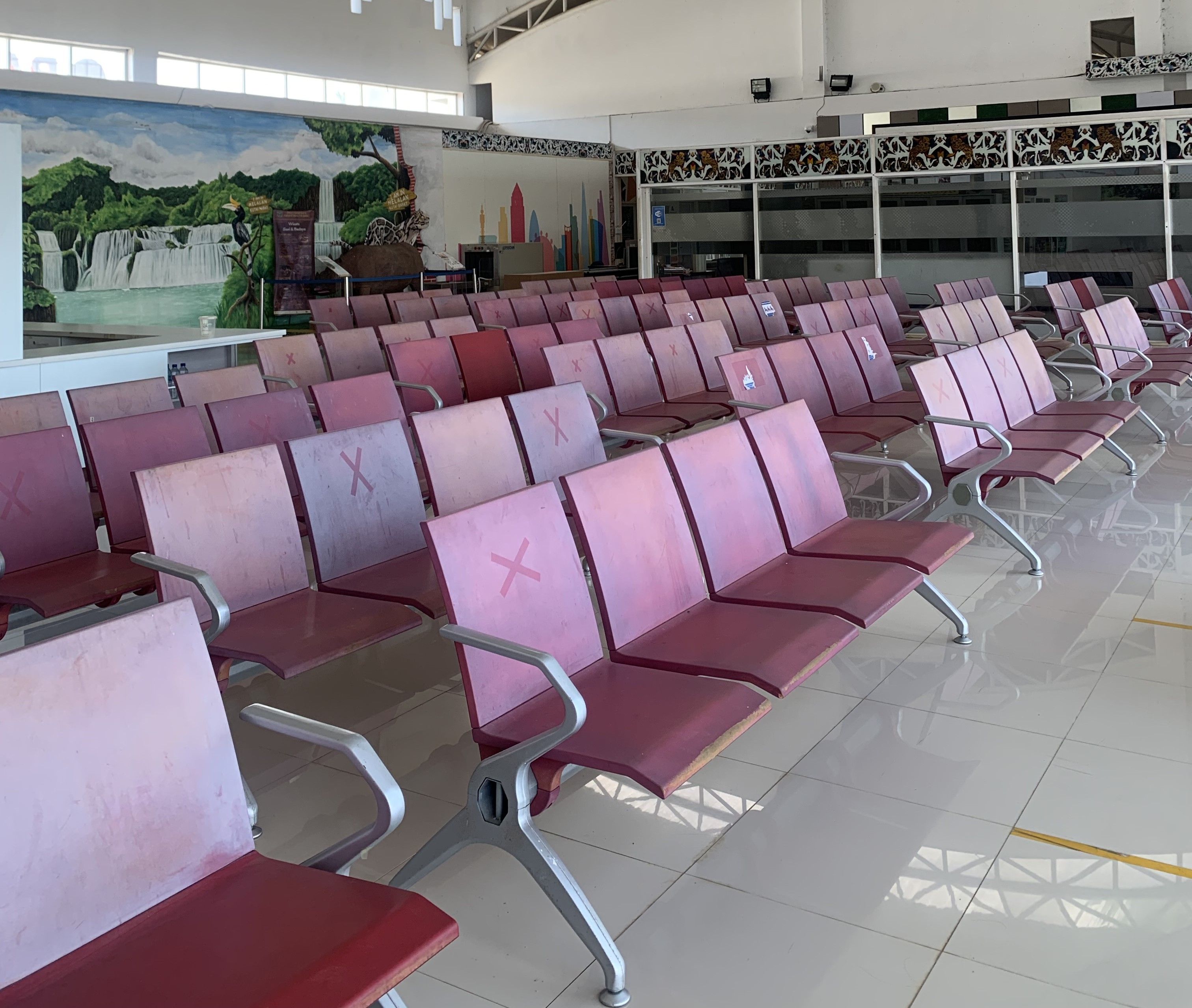
Boarding gate

The passenger terminal covers an area of approximately 1,000 m², with a boarding lounge capable of accommodating up to 200 passengers per day. It is equipped with basic facilities, including check-in counters, a boarding gate, a baggage claim area, a smoking room, a priority waiting room, a VIP room, and a reading corner. The airport also has a 340 m² cargo terminal, a 332 m² Aircraft Rescue and Fire Fighting (PKP-PK) building, a 120 m² administrative building, and an AirNav Indonesia air traffic control (ATC) tower. In 2019, Ground Support Equipment (GSE) was added to the airport to support ground handling operations. GSE comprises various types of equipment used to service aircraft before departure and after arrival, including ground power supply, aircraft movement, passenger and cargo loading, baggage handling, and other essential ground handling activities.

On the airside, the airport currently has a single runway measuring 1,300 m × 30 m, capable of accommodating aircraft such as the ATR 42 and the ATR 72. However, due to the runway's limited length, ATR 72 operations are restricted to a maximum of 50 passengers rather than its full capacity of 72. To address this limitation, the airport authorities proposed extending the runway to 1,450 m, and ultimately to 1,700 meters. In 2022, work was underway on land filling and ground preparation. Once these works were completed, runway construction was scheduled to proceed. The runway itself was planned to be extended from 1,300 to 1,400 meters, with a 150-meter Runway End Safety Area (RESA) added at each end. This would bring the total length of the upgraded runway area to 1,700 meters. The project was initially targeted for completion in 2022. However, as of 2026, technical issues at the site have delayed the project, and the runway extension remains incomplete.

Other airside facilities include a single taxiway measuring 75 m × 16 m and an aircraft apron measuring 170 m × 75 m.

== Airlines and destinations ==
Airlines	Destinations
Susi Air	Long Pahangai
Wings Air	Balikpapan, Samarinda

== Statistics ==
Annual passenger numbers and aircraft statistics
Year	Passengers handled	Passenger % change	Cargo (tonnes)	Cargo % change	Aircraft movements	Aircraft % change
2006	N/A	Steady	N/A	Steady	N/A	Steady
2007	N/A	Steady	N/A	Steady	N/A	Steady
2008	N/A	Steady	N/A	Steady	N/A	Steady
2009	N/A	Steady	N/A	Steady	N/A	Steady
2010	4,929	Steady	2.68	Steady	601	Steady
2011	12,484	▲153.3	4.23	▲57.8	1,542	▲156.6
2012	8,508	▼31.8	2.04	▼51.8	1,018	▼34.0
2013	21,730	▲155.4	2.26	▲10.8	1,466	▲44.0
2014	42,454	▲95.4	12.93	▲472.1	1,678	▲14.5
2015	33,341	▼21.5	22.76	▲76.0	1,640	▼2.3
2016	33,133	▼0.6	19.26	▼15.4	1,478	▼9.9
2017	13,999	▼57.7	4.51	▼76.6	916	▼38.0
2018	44,659	▲219.0	18.42	▲308.4	1,709	▲86.6
2019	58,543	▲31.1	0.13	▼99.3	1,972	▲15.4
2020	13,759	▼76.5	2.21	▲1600.0	797	▼59.6
2021	2,940	▼78.6	N/A	Steady	346	▼56.6
2022	3,726	▲26.7	3.19	Steady	347	▲0.3
2023	8,978	▲141.0	155.28	▲4767.7	786	▲126.5
2024	23,086	▲157.1	260.68	▲67.9	1,265	▲60.9
^{Source: DGCA, BPS}
