= Dayak Tunjung people =

Ethnic group in Indonesia

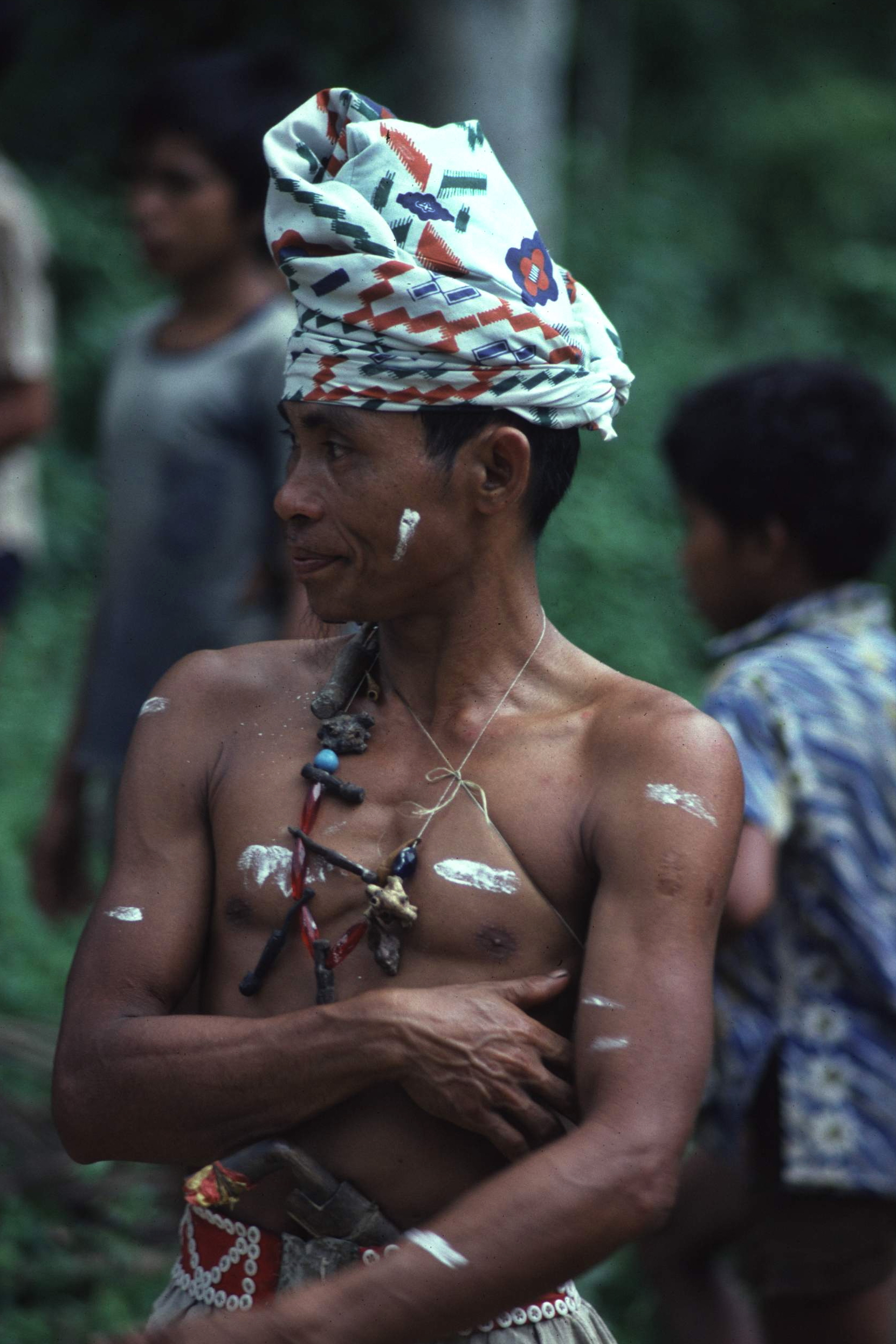
- A Dayak Tunjung shaman in West Kutai Regency

Total population
- Approximately 76,000

Regions with significant populations
- Indonesia (Kutai Kartanegara Regency and West Kutai Regency, East Kalimantan)

Languages
- Tunjung, Indonesian

Religion
- 98% Christianity (Catholicism and Protestantism); 2% Islam; Kaharingan (minority)

Related ethnic groups
- Dayak (Ot Danum branch), Benuaq

The Dayak Tunjung people, also known as Tonyooi people, are an ethnic group living in West Kutai Regency (24.2%) and Kutai Kartanegara Regency, East Kalimantan, Indonesia.

They are distributed across several districts, including Kota Bangun, Melak, Barong Tongkok, Kembang Janggut, Kenohan, and Muara Pahu. The Tunjung are divided into subgroups: Tunjung Bubut, Tunjung Asli, Tunjung Bahau, Tunjung Hilir, Tunjung Lonokng, Tunjung Linggang, and Tunjung Berambai.

The alternative name Tonyoi-Benuaq refers to the Tunjung-Benuaq. These two Dayak groups are closely connected socially and culturally, although they are sometimes mentioned separately.

The relationship between the Tunjung and Kutai people is comparable to the relationship between the Baduy and Bantenese: the Kutai and Bantenese people are almost entirely Muslim, whereas the Tunjung and Baduy tribes still incorporate indigenous beliefs.

== History and etymology ==
There is no written record about the origin of Dayak Tunjung. Oral tradition relates that the Tunjung descended from deities who became humans to restore a broken world, known as Jaruk’ng Tempuq. Their original name, Tonyooi, reflects their ancestral hero role as protective deities. The term tunjung in the Tunjung language means "going home" or "going towards the river source".

The Tunjung live alongside the Dayak Benuaq, who share historical and cultural connections. Conversion to Christianity occurred in the mid-19th century. In Kenohan and Muara Wis, most Tunjung belong to the Indonesian Bethel Church (Protestant). In West Kutai Regency, around 53.5% are Protestant, 44.5% Roman Catholic, 1.5% Muslim, and 0.5% Kaharingan adherents.

== Religion ==
Most Tunjung are Christian, with a minority practicing Islam. Ancestor spirits are still honored for protection and prosperity, mediated by shamans (beliatn). The influence of Islam is minimal; for example, the name of the supreme deity, Laraia, derives from Allah (ta'ala) but is used differently in rituals.

== Livelihood ==
The Tunjung primarily practice agriculture, often shifting cultivation, with rice as the main crop. They also grow secondary crops such as corn, cassava, sweet potato, legumes, vegetables, and perennial trees like coconut, durian, rambutan, cempedak, and langsat. Supplementary activities include fishing with traditional traps, hunting, and harvesting forest products like rattan, resin, tengkawang wood, and bird nests.

== Associations ==
Currently, several associations unite the sub-ethnic groups, such as Sempekat Tonyoi Benuaq (STB), a member of East Kalimantan Dayak Association (PDKT). Other organizations include Sempekat Tonyooi Sekolaq and TBBR (Pasukan Merah TBBR), which focus on preserving Dayak customs and culture across Kalimantan, Sarawak, and Brunei Darussalam.

== Language ==
The Tunjung speak the Tunjung language, with five dialects: Central Tunjung, Londong, Linggang, Berambai, and Pahu. Most are bilingual in Indonesian, and many understand the Kutai, Banjar, or Benuaq languages. Tunjung belongs to the Barito-Mahakam group of Austronesian languages.

=== Dialects and Subgroups ===
- Tunjung Bubut: Asa, Juhan Asa, Balok Asa, Pepas, Juaq, Muara Asa, Ongko, Ombau, Ngenyan, Gemuhan
- Tunjung Asli: New Geleo and Old Geleo
- Tunjung Bahau: Barong Tongkok, Sekolaq Darat, Sekolaq Muliaq, Sekolaq Oday, Sekolaq Joleq
- Tunjung Hilir: Empas, Empakuq, Bunyut, Kuangan
- Tunjung Lonokng: Gemuruh, Sekong Rotoq, Sakaq Tada, Gadur
- Tunjung Linggang: Linggang Bigung, Linggang Melapeh, Linggang Mapan, Linggang Amer, Linggang Kebut, Linggang Mencelew, Linggang Marimun, Linggang Muara Leban, Linggang Muara Mujan, Linggang Tering, Linggang Jelemuq, Linggang Kelubaq, Linggang Tutung, Lakan Bilem, Intu Lingau, Muara Batuq, Muyub
- Tunjung Berambai: Muara Pahu, Abit, Selais, Muara Jawaq, Kota Bangun, Enggelam, Lamin Telihan, Malong, Pelay, Kembang Janggut, Kelekat, Buaq, Pulau Pinang, Teluk Bingkai, Lamin Pulut, Bukit Layang

The Dayak Tunjung people inhabit the following areas:

1. Long Iram, West Kutai Regency
2. Tering
3. Linggang Bigung
4. Barong Tongkok
5. Melak
6. Sekolaq Darat
7. Muara Pahu
8. Mook Manor Bulatn
9. Muara Wis, Kutai Kartanegara Regency
  1. Village of Enggelam, Muara Wis, Kutai Kartanegara Regency
10. Kembang Janggut, Kutai Kartanegara Regency
  1. Village of Kelekat
  2. Village of Bukit Layang
  3. Village of Pulau Pinang
  4. Dusun Buaq
11. Kenohan, Kutai Kartanegara Regency
  1. Village of Lamin Telihan
  2. Village of Teluk Bingkai
  3. Village of Lamin Pulut
  4. Dusun Malong
  5. Dusun Pelay
12. Dusun Rajak, Village of Kedang Murung, Kota Bangun, Kutai Kartanegara Regency

== Kinship ==
The Tunjung follow bilateral kinship principles, tracing both paternal and maternal lines. Kinship groups are organized into purus (blood or marriage ties). Villages evolved from longhouses (luu), with social stratification historically marked as hajiiq (royalty), mantiiq (guards and subordinates), erentikaaq (commoners), and ripatn (servants).

== Organizations ==
Youth organizations include:

- KPADK (Komando Pertahanan Adat Dayak Kalimantan)
- LPADKT (Laskar Pertahanan Adat Dayak Kalimantan Timur)
- Punggawa

== Notable people ==
- Dr. Yurnalis Ngayoh (former Governor of East Kalimantan)
- Mgr. J. Husin, MSF (former bishop of Palangkaraya)
- Mgr. F. Sului, MSF (former bishop Samarinda)
- Ismael Thomas, former Regent of West Kutai (2006–2016), DPR RI member 2019–2024
- Y. Dullah, Chairman of the Customary Council, West Kutai
- Drs. Thomas Edison M.Si., Director General of Protestant Christian Ministry, Depag RI Jakarta
- Prof. Dr. Laurentius Dyson P, Postgraduate Lecturer UNAIR Surabaya
- Col. Yohanes Ubad, former Mawil Hansip Bankalan Madura
- Dr. Michael Elias Malat, former Dean of Economics Faculty, Universitas Pelita Harapan

== Arts ==
Tunjung villages are genealogically unified. Traditional songs include bedoneq, sung without instruments at festivities. Dances include: tari jepen, jepen tali, and jepen sidabil. Musical instruments include klenrangan, a gong-based ensemble, originally made of wood, later metal. Artistic works include small charms and large ceremonial statues up to four meters tall.

=== Tunjung songs ===
- Tonau
- Waweq Daraaq
- Waweq BataK Umaq
- Asangk Pejaai
- Asakng Aur Sion Lingooq
- Bujakng Pelegaq
- Besukaar Tonar Nataar
- Borneo
- Kinu Kempunaan
- Tuaaq Terunaaq
- Potah
- Merutuh
- Nasihat Tonaar Belupm
