= Bonifasius Belawan Geh =

Indonesian businessman and politician (born 1962)

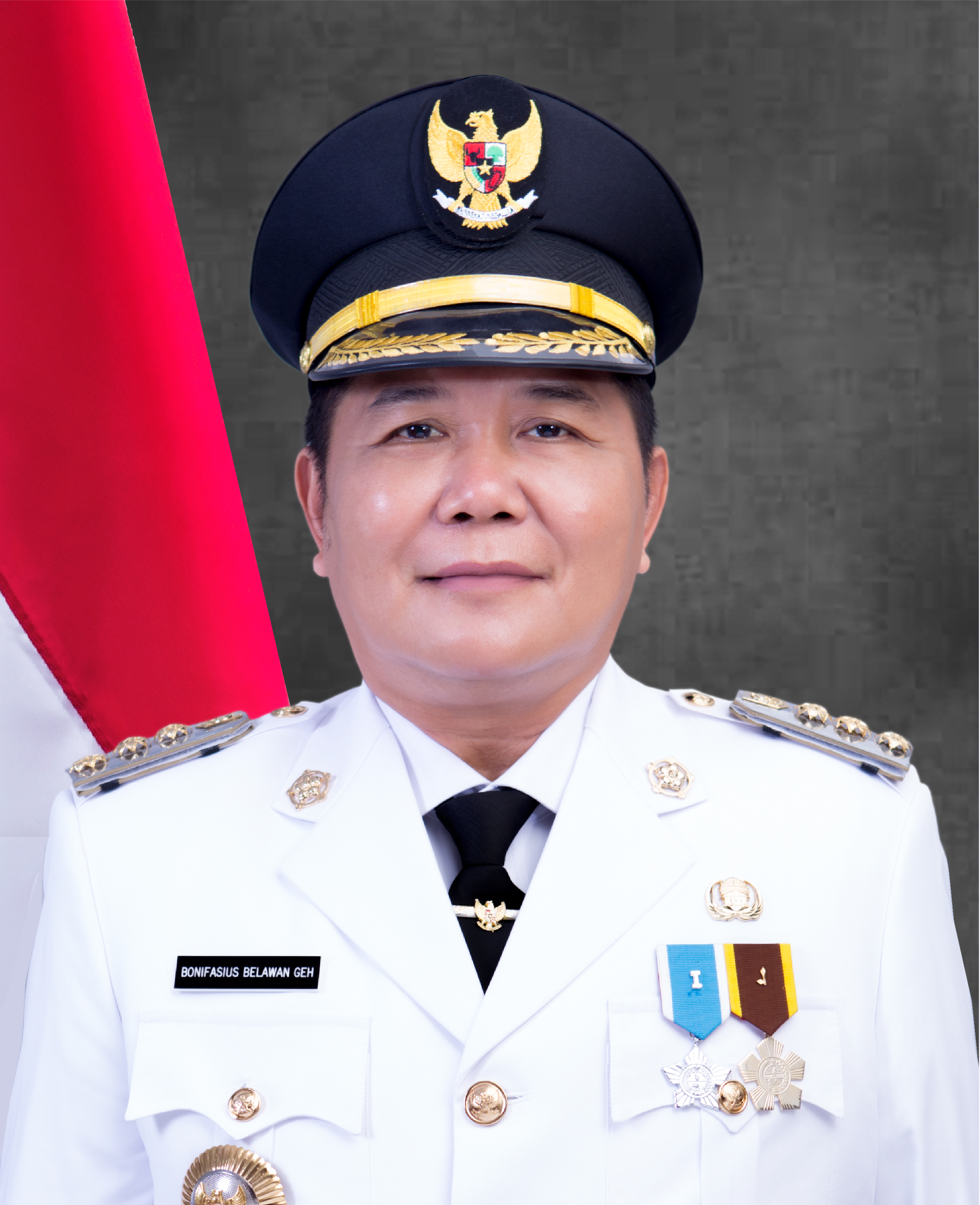
- Official portrait, 2021

Regent of Mahakam Ulu
- In office 17 February 2016 – 23 September 2025
- Preceded by: Frederick Bid (acting)
- Succeeded by: Angela Idang Belawan Geh

Personal details
- Born: 17 September 1962 (age 63) Mamahak Besar village, Long Bagun, Mahakam Ulu, East Kalimantan, Indonesia
- Party: Great Indonesia Movement Party (Gerindra)
- Education: Mulawarman University
- Occupation: Politician; Businessman

Bonifasius Belawan Geh (born 17 September 1962), also known popularly as "Mr. Boni", is an Indonesian businessman and politician who served as a two-terms regent of Mahakam Ulu. He was the first elected to the regency since its creation, after the separation of the regency from West Kutai, having previously been led by two acting regents. As regent, he initiated several infrastructure programs in the region, including the first asphalt-sealed road in the regency to alleviate the region's remoteness.

== Biography ==
=== Early life and education ===
Bonifasius was born in the small Dayak village of Mahamak Besar, Long Bagun District, inside the Heart of Borneo on 17 September 1962. He is native Dayak descent from a small farmer family. He enrolled in primary school in his village until from 1974 to 1980 when he moved to town of Tering in West Kutai for junior high-school.

He then moved again to the city of Samarinda to pursue vocational education until graduating in 1986. Afterward, he enrolled in Mulawarman University and studied in the teaching faculty. However, due to his mother's illness, he came back to the village and worked on a plantation instead of pursuing higher education, dropping out from the college. He also collected swiftlet nest in the jungle for additional money to support his family.

=== Early career ===
Bonifasius soon became involved in a swiftlet nest business and rented a cave inside the jungle, from which he harvested bird's nests. After accumulating money from selling bird's nest, he founded a logging company in 1999. His company obtained a permit to manage around 13,000 hectares of jungle in Kutai Kartanegara Regency and he also expanded his business to heavy equipments. He later became in charge of a cooperative, and then pursued a law degree at "17th August University." He also became the director of a coal trading company based in Samarinda, PT Cahaya Belawan Sejahtera until 2013.

=== Political career ===
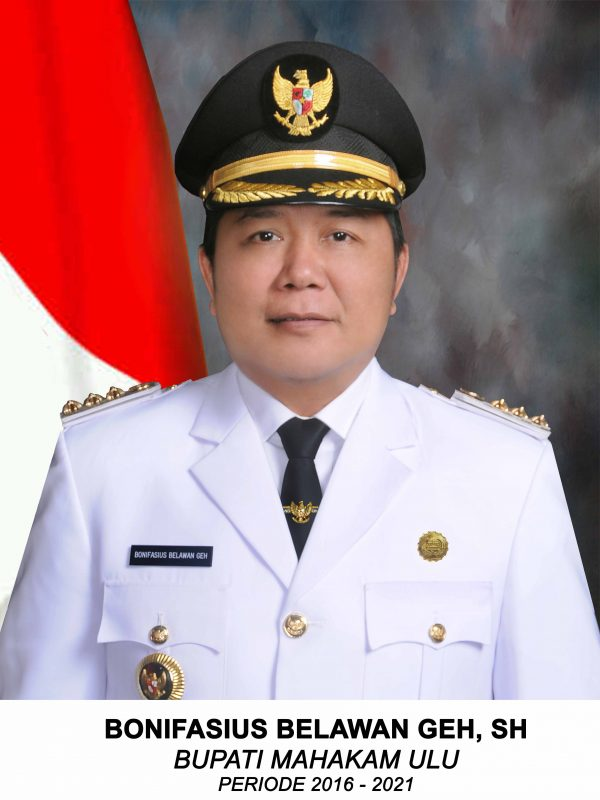
Official portrait as Regent, c. September 2020

He became a representative in the newly formed Mahakam Ulu Regency's parliament in 2014 and became vice speaker of the parliament. In 2015, he became speaker of the parliament but resigned not long after to run as regent in the 2015 Indonesian local elections. He was elected as the first regent of Mahakam Ulu that was previously led by the acting regent. He was then re-elected in 2020. He is also the chief of Great Indonesia Movement Party regional branch in the regency.

During his tenure, the regency built its first asphalt-sealed road in Ujoh Bilang which is the regency's administrative center in 2018. The road was planned to be constructed connecting the village of Long Bagun and also the town of Tering. As of 2021, the road's construction has been ongoing with another section connecting the villages of Mahamak Besar and Long Melaham. He plans to also upgrade the recently built road connecting the villages of Ujoh Bilang and Mahamak Besar, expanding it to a two-lane road, the first of its kind in the region. He stated that road constructions are needed in the regency to remove the region's remoteness and make transportation easier than previously, which consistent mostly of using boats on the river. He also stated that the road construction would make the price of goods in the region cheaper. His plan, however, was criticized by environmentalists due to fear of destruction of Heart of Borneo's jungles.

His program included construction of office complex for regency's government in Ujoh Bilang due to previously the regency has no definitive office building. He also initiated telecommunication infrastructure in small villages in the regency, as well as stating that food sufficiency is also his top priority. He was succeeded by Angela Idang Belawan Geh, his daughter, who was elected on 2024 after an election repeat ordered by Constitutional Court due to irregularities, with accusations of him trying to build a political dynasty and using his incumbency to support his daughter's campaign.

== Personal life ==
Bonifasius is married to Yovita Bulan Bonifasius, and they have five children.
