= 2024 West Kutai regency election =

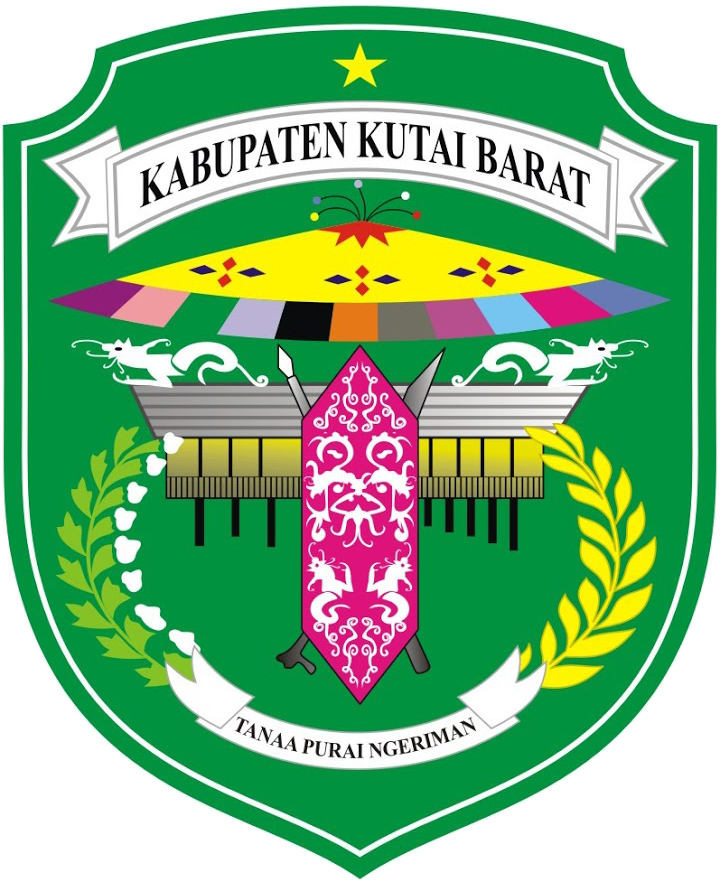
- 27 November 2024
- Turnout: 75%
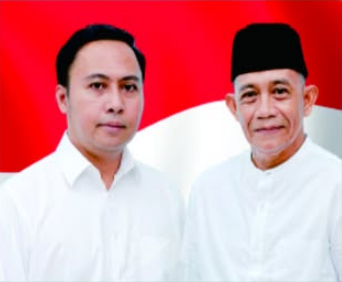

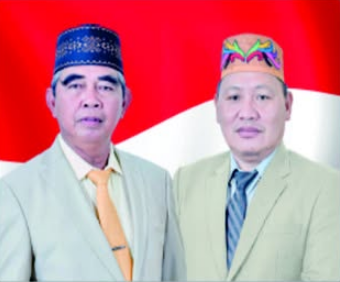

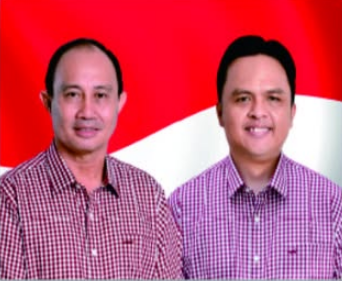
Candidate	Frederick Edwin	Ahmad Syaiful	Sahadi
Party	PDI-P	Golkar	Hanura
Running mate	Nanang Adriani	Jainuddin	Alexander Edmond
Popular vote	37,282	29,572	27,248
Percentage	39.6%	31.4%	29%
Regent before election
F. X. Yapan
PDI-P
Elected Regent
Frederick Edwin
PDI-P

The 2024 West Kutai regency election was held on 27 November 2024 as part of simultaneous nationwide local elections in order to elected the regent and vice regent of West Kutai, East Kalimantan, for the 2025–2030 term. Frederick Edwin, a businessman and son of former regent Ismail Thomas, defeated two other candidates after securing 37,282 votes (39.6%).

== Electoral system ==
The election, like other local elections in 2024, followed the first-past-the-post system where the candidate with the most votes wins the election, even if they do not win a majority. It is possible for a candidate to run uncontested, in which case the candidate is still required to win a majority of votes "against" an "empty box" option. Should the candidate fail to do so, the election would have been repeated on a later date.

The West Kutai General Elections Commission (KPU) announced on 20 September 2024 that the election would have 128,104 eligible voters who were to vote in 321 polling stations. The municipal government granted Rp 48 billion from its budget for the election, primarily in grants to KPU and the General Election Supervisory Agency (Bawaslu), in addition to additional funding for the local police and military unit for security expenses.

== Candidates ==
One of the candidates in the election, Frederick Edwin, is a businessman, PDI-P member, and younger son of former two-term West Kutai regent Ismail Thomas. Running with Nanang Adriani, Edwin received the endorsement of seven political parties with seats in the municipal legislature (PDI-P, Gerindra, Nasdem, Demokrat, PKB, PKS, and PAN) plus four other parties.

Another candidate, Sahadi, is a former civil servant within the municipal government. Having retired from his job to run in the election, he received the endorsements of Hanura and Perindo in addition to PKN. Sahadi's running mate Alexander Edmond is Frederick Edwin's older brother and also a businessman.

Golkar ran its own candidate, municipal legislature member Ahmad Syaiful. His running mate, Jainudin, was a Gerindra member of the municipal legislature, although the ticket did not receive Gerindra's endorsement.

Incumbent regent Fransiskus Xaverius Yapan had served two terms and was ineligible for reelection, and instead endorsed the Sahadi–Edmond ticket.

== Campaign ==
Two rounds of public debates between the candidates were held on 14 October and 3 November 2024. The final campaign event of the Edwin–Adriani ticket, held in Sendawar on 21 November, involved Jakarta-based rock band The Virgin and was attended by thousands of spectators.

== Results ==
Candidate	Running mate	Candidate party	Votes	%
Frederick Edwin	Nanang Adriani	PDI-P	37,282	39.62
Ahmad Syaiful	Jainudin	Golkar	29,572	31.43
Sahadi	Alexander Edmond	Hanura	27,248	28.96
Total			94,102	100.00
Valid votes			94,102	97.92
Invalid/blank votes			2,002	2.08
Total votes			96,104	100.00
Registered voters/turnout			128,104	75.02

Out of West Kutai's sixteen districts, Frederick Edwin–Nanang Adriani won the most votes in six districts, while Ahmad Syaiful–Jainudin and Sahadi–Alexander Edmond both won the most votes in five districts. Edwin and Adriani were sworn in on 20 February 2025.
