= Tunjung =

Tunjung may refer to:

- Tunjung people, a Dayak ethnic group from East Kalimantan, Indonesia
- Tunjung language, a language spoken by the Tunjung people
- Gregoria Mariska Tunjung, Indonesian badminton player
