= Frederick Edwin =

Indonesian businessman and politician

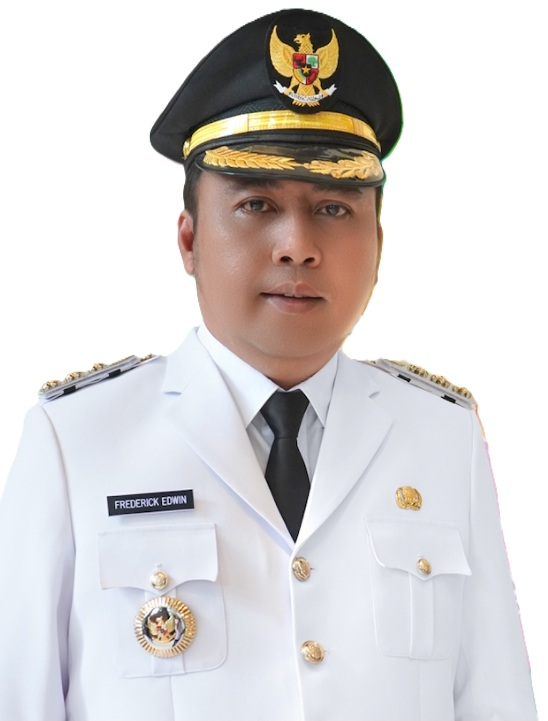
- 2025 portrait

4th Regent of West Kutai
- Incumbent
- Assumed office 20 February 2025
- Governor: Rudy Mas'ud
- Deputy: Nanang Adriani
- Preceded by: Fransiskus Xaverius Yapan

Personal details
- Born: 19 February 1985 (age 40) Samarinda, East Kalimantan, Indonesia
- Political party: PDI-P
- Relatives: Ismail Thomas (father)

Frederick Edwin (born 19 February 1985) is an Indonesian businessman and politician who has served as regent of West Kutai Regency, East Kalimantan since February 2025.

== Early life ==
Frederick Edwin was born on 19 February 1985 in Samarinda as the youngest son of Ismail Thomas and Lusia Mayo Thomas. Ismail Thomas served two terms as West Kutai's regent between 2006 and 2016, and was a member of the House of Representatives from 2019 to 2023 when he was removed for a corruption case. Edwin completed middle and high school at the W.R. Soepratman school in Samarinda, graduating from high school in 2002.

== Career ==
After completing his studies, Edwin began to enter business, eventually having interests in mining, bottled drinking water, and hotels.

In 2024, Edwin contested West Kutai's regency election, selecting municipal civil servant Nanang Adriani as his running mate. The ticket received the support of a coalition of 11 parties led by the Indonesian Democratic Party of Struggle, which Edwin is a member of. In the ensuing three-way election, Edwin and Adriani placed first after securing 37,282 votes (39.6%). One of the competing candidates' running mates, Alexander Edmond, is Edwin's older brother. Edwin and Adriani were sworn in as regent and vice regent on 20 February 2025, along with most other regional leaders elected in 2024.

As a regent, Edwin has pushed for the strengthening of roads connecting West Kutai to the neighboring regencies of Mahakam Ulu and Kutai Kartanegara, which had previously required annual maintenance. He also increased scholarship funding for basic education from the municipal budget, from Rp 600 million (USD 40,000) to Rp 3 billion (USD 200,000) in 2025.

== Personal life ==
Edwin is a Catholic. He married Maria Christiana Mozes on 19 February 2020, hosting a wedding attended by over 1,000 people.
