= Tering =

Tering may refer to:

- Têring, a village located in Tibet
- Tering, West Kutai, a district in West Kutai Regency, East Kalimantan, Indonesia
