= Yapan =

Yapan is a surname. Notable people with the surname include:

- Alvin Yapan (fl. 2013), Filipino director
- Fransiskus Xaverius Yapan (born 1958), Indonesian politician
