= Ismail Thomas =

Indonesian politician (born 1955)

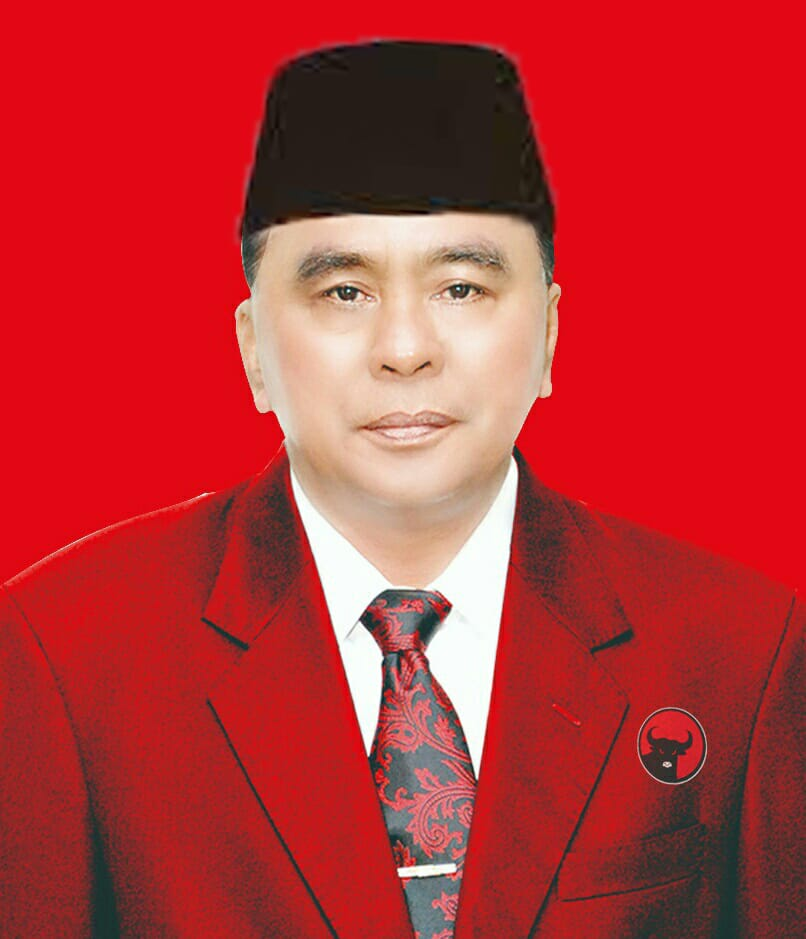
- Thomas as a DPR member

Member of the House of Representatives
- In office 1 October 2019 – 15 August 2023
- Succeeded by: Andhika Hasan
- Constituency: East Kalimantan
- Majority: 49,174

2nd Regent of West Kutai
- In office 19 April 2006 – 19 April 2016
- Preceded by: Rama Alexander Asia
- Succeeded by: Fransiskus Xaverius Yapan

Personal details
- Born: 31 January 1955 (age 70); West Kutai, East Kalimantan, Indonesia
- Political party: PDI-P (until 2023)
- Relatives: Frederick Edwin (son)

Ismail Thomas (born 31 January 1955) is an Indonesian politician formerly of the Indonesian Democratic Party of Struggle (PDI-P). He was a member of the House of Representatives (DPR) from 2019 to 2023 and regent of West Kutai Regency, East Kalimantan for two terms between 2006 and 2016. He was removed from DPR and fired from PDI-P in 2023 due to a corruption case.

== Early life ==
Ismail Thomas was born in the village of Linggah Melapeh, today in West Kutai Regency, on 31 January 1955 to Yohannes Benedictus Leneq and Albina Rentik. He studied at the W.R. Soepratman Catholic school, graduating from high school in 1973. He then resumed his education by studying for a diploma in law at 17 August 1945 University Samarinda. He would later obtain a bachelor's degree (2003) at the Jakarta Law Institute and a master's in public administration (2009) at Mulawarman University.

== Career ==
Thomas began to work for PT Kelian Equatorial Mining (a Rio Tinto owned company) in 1990 as a supervisor. In 2000, he joined the newly formed West Kutai Regency's Regional House of Representatives (DPRD) as a PDI-P member. The following year, he would be elected to become vice regent of Rama Alexander Asia.

In 2006, when West Kutai held its first ever direct regency election, Thomas ran with the backing of PDI-P and PAN with Didik Effendi as his running mate. The pair won the election after securing 27,639 votes, defeating Rama, and they were sworn in as regent and vice regent on 19 April 2006. They were reelected in 2011. Thomas would be succeeded by Fransiskus Xaverius Yapan in 2016, who had led Thomas' campaign teams in 2006 and 2011 and received Thomas' endorsement for his own electoral run.

During his tenure as regent, Thomas gave official recognition to the pakaatn nyahuq ritual of the Benuaq Dayak people, turning it into an official annual event. There were significant disputes between local Dayaks and palm oil plantation/coal mining companies during his tenure, with several locals who claimed to have lost their lands protesting against Thomas. Thomas in turn claimed that the protesters were supporters of his opponent in the 2010 election. Thomas had begun issuing land concessions to the companies in January 2010.

After the end of his regency, Thomas considered a run in the 2018 East Kalimantan gubernatorial election, before instead running in the 2019 Indonesian general election and winning a seat in the House of Representatives covering East Kalimantan's at-large district with 49,174 votes.

=== Corruption case ===
On 15 August 2023, the Attorney General's Office of Indonesia announced Thomas' designation of a suspect in a corruption case involving the issuance of a mining permit. He was found guilty of falsifying documents in order to get the permit, and he was sentenced to one year's prison in February 2024. Following an appeal, his sentence was reduced to one year's detention within city limits. Prosecutors had initially sought a five-year sentence.

He was fired by PDI-P and lost his DPR seat due to the case, and he was replaced by Andhika Hasan.

== Personal life ==
He is a Catholic. He is married to Lusia Mayo Thomas, and the couple has two sons. The younger son, Frederick Edwin, was elected West Kutai's regent in 2024, defeating the older son Alexander Edmond (who ran as another candidate's running mate).
