= GEHS =

GEHS may refer to:

- Gardner Edgerton High School, Gardener, Kansas, United States
- Glenbard East High School, Lombard, Illinois, United States
- Greenbrier East High School, Fairlea, West Virginia, United States

== See also ==
- GEH (disambiguation)
