= Engkuni Pasek =

Engkuni Pasek is a village in Barong Tongkok, West Kutai, East Kalimantan, Indonesia. The village is near Idan river and Goa Batu waterfall.
