= Tiong Ohang =

- Village
- Location of Tiong Ohang Tiong Ohang (Kalimantan) Tiong Ohang (Indonesia)
- Coordinates: 0°46′29.5″N 114°16′17.9″E

Tiong Ohang is a village (kampung) in Long Apari District, Mahakam Ulu Regency, East Kalimantan, Indonesia. The village is located near the Müller Mountains on the banks of the Mahakam River. The village is connected via a suspension bridge (which supports motorbikes but not larger vehicles) to the village of Tiong Bu'u, which is located on the opposite bank of the river. The village has a high school and government administrative services counter.
