= Long Iram =

District of West Kutai Regency, East Kalimantan

- District
- Interactive map of Long Iram
- Location in Kalimantan and Indonesia Long Iram (Kalimantan) Long Iram (Indonesia)
- Coordinates: 0°1′5.17400″S 115°37′33.50845″E
- Country: Indonesia
- Province: East Kalimantan
- Regency: West Kutai
- District seat: Long Iram Kota

Government
  - District head (Camat): Burhanuddin

Area
  - Total: 1,459.45 km^{2} (563.50 sq mi)

Population (2023)
  - Total: 7,661
  - Density: 5.249/km^{2} (13.60/sq mi)
- Time zone: UTC+8 (ICT)
- Regional code: 64.07.05
- Villages: 11

Long Iram (Indonesian pronunciation: [ˈlɔŋ ˈiram]) is a district of West Kutai Regency, East Kalimantan, Indonesia. As of 2023, it was inhabited by 7,661 people, and currently has a total area of 1,459.45 km^{2}. Its district seat is located at the village of Long Iram Kota.

Long Iram shares borders with Long Hubung (Mahakam Ulu) to the north, Linggang Bigung to the west, and Tering to the south and east.

== History ==
On 11 June 1996, Long Hubung was created as a separate district from Long Iram. This move was soon followed by the creation of the districts of Linggang Bigung on 16 July 1999 (involving only the villages of Linggang Tutung, Linggang Melapeh Baru, and Linggang Bigung Baru), then Laham (from Long Hubung) and Tering (added with two villages from Melak) on 5 June 2003. Since its formation in 2013, Long Hubung and Laham now belong to Mahakam Ulu Regency, in contrast with three other districts, all of which are still part of West Kutai.
