= Geh (surname) =

Geh is a surname. It can be a German surname related to the French Gay, or a romanization of the Chinese surname Ni (倪), commonly used in Malaysia and Singapore.

Notable people with the surname include:

- Bonifasius Belawan Geh (born 1962), Indonesian politician and regent of Mahakam Ulu
- Geh Min (born 1950), Singaporean ophthalmologist and former Nominated Member of Parliament
- Selvanus Geh (born 1993), Indonesian badminton player
- Sue Geh (1959–1998), Australian basketball player

== See also ==
- GEH (disambiguation)
