= Rama Alexander Asia =

Indonesian politician (born 1945)

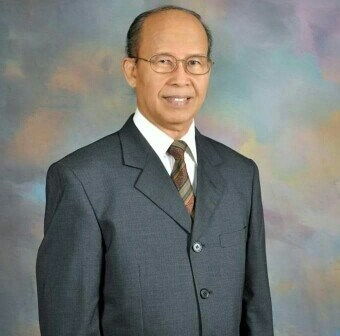

1st Regent of West Kutai
- In office 12 October 1999 – 19 April 2006
- Preceded by: Position created
- Succeeded by: Ismail Thomas

Member of East Kalimantan DPRD
- In office 1 September 2014 – 2 December 2015

Personal details
- Born: 17 September 1945
- Died: 10 April 2026 (aged 80) Samarinda
- Party: Hanura

Rama Alexander Asia (17 September 1945 – 10 April 2026) was an Indonesian politician and former bureaucrat who served as the first regent of West Kutai Regency, East Kalimantan, from the regency's formation in October 1999 until April 2006. He also served for some time as a member of the East Kalimantan Regional House of Representatives.

== Early life ==
Rama Alexander Asia was born on 17 September 1945. After completing high school in Banjarbaru, he studied agricultural science at the Jenderal Soedirman University in Purwokerto, Central Java.

== Career ==
Rama began to work as a civil servant starting in 1964, initially within municipal agricultural departments. By 1989, he had become head of East Kalimantan's investment agency, a position he held until 1999.

On 12 October 1999, he was appointed as provisional regent of the newly formed West Kutai Regency. His initial task was forming a municipal government for the new regency, and setting up government facilities ranging from public offices to a new municipal hospital. He also aimed to improve land connectivity of the regency, much of which was only accessible by boat from the provincial capital of Samarinda early in his tenure. In 2001, the newly formed West Kutai Regional House of Representatives (DPRD) voted to make Rama regent for the 2001–2006 term, with Ismail Thomas being elected his vice regent. He received the Satyalancana Pembangunan medal in 2005 for his work in West Kutai.

During his term, Rama was a supporter of community forestry, limiting the issuance of commercial forest exploitation permits starting in 2001 and forming a working group of government officials and community leaders for local forestry management. He also attempted to allow community forestry permits issued by West Kutai be valid for 100 years, in violation of national regulations (which allowed a maximum permit length of 25 years). Rama also attempted to promote palm oil development, supporting the establishment of a processing plant within the regency. A land conflict between local Dayaks and a logging company flared up in 1999, with Rama eventually issuing regulations on compensation fees to locals from the company.

=== Post-regency ===
In 2006, Rama ran for a second term in the regency's first direct election, but was defeated by Ismail Thomas. He made another attempt for a second term in West Kutai in 2011, again losing to Thomas. He was elected as a member of the East Kalimantan Regional House of Representatives from the People's Conscience Party following the 2014 Indonesian legislative election, but he resigned in 2015 to make a third run for a second term. He placed third in 2015 out of four candidates with 21,154 votes (25.5%), with Fransiskus Xaverius Yapan winning the election. In 2019, he founded the "Rama Center" in preparation for the 2020 regency election, but eventually did not run.

He died on 10 April 2026 at the Abdoel Wahab Sjahranie Hospital in Samarinda.
