= Ampanang language =

Extinct Austronesian language of Kalimantan, Indonesia

Ampanang
- Behasa Ampanang
- Native to: Indonesia
- Region: Kenohan, Kutai Kartanegara Regency, East Kalimantan
- Extinct: after 1981
- Language family: Austronesian: Malayo-Polynesian; Mahakam; Ampanang

Language codes
- ISO 639-3: apg
- Glottolog: ampa1239

Ampanang is an extinct Austronesian language spoken at the village of Ampanang (no longer exists today), at the Kahala river (flowing into Lake Semayang and eventually the Mahakam), modern-day East Kalimantan. It is closely related to Tunjung, forming the Mahakam languages. This language has extremely little documentation, and is only known from a 19-word vocabulary list on Beschrijving van de Onderafdeeling Koetei (1905). However, the 16th edition of the Ethnologue reported 30,000 speakers as of 1981.

== Vocabulary ==
Ampanang is only known from a trivial list of 19 words plus its native name, and both were included on S. C. Knappert's work Beschrijving van de Onderafdeeling Koetei from 1905. While the paper largely focused on the Subdistrict of Kutai and its history, he reported that Ampanang had been already displaced by, or mixed with Kutainese or Malay among the younger generation.

English	Ampanang (in modern spelling)	Indonesian
man	liha	laki-laki
woman	wawé	perempuan ~ wanita
child	toehi (tuhi)	anak
river	loeah (luah)	sungai
house	ĕloe (elu)	rumah
cat	méong	kucing
dog	imong	anjing
sick	pĕrah (perah)	sakit
so (adverb)	soeah (suah)	sekali
Numbers
one	ca (tja)	satu
two	rĕga (rega)	dua
three	tĕlu (telu)	tiga
four	apat	empat
five	lima	lima
six	hagan	enam
seven	toetjoe (tucu)	tujuh
eight	haloeng (halung)	delapan
nine	salatian	sembilan
ten	sapoeloeh (sapuluh)	sepuluh
