= Penyinggahan =

District of West Kutai Regency, East Kalimantan

- District
- Interactive map of Penyinggahan
- Location in Kalimantan and Indonesia Penyinggahan (Kalimantan) Penyinggahan (Indonesia)
- Coordinates: 0°23′6.31410″S 116°13′17.82012″E
- Country: Indonesia
- Province: East Kalimantan
- Regency: West Kutai
- Established: 30 May 1965
- District seat: Penyinggahan Ilir

Government
  - District head (Camat): Gusti Muhammad Padli

Area
  - Total: 206.12 km^{2} (79.58 sq mi)

Population (2023)
  - Total: 4,026
  - Density: 19.53/km^{2} (50.59/sq mi)
- Time zone: UTC+8 (ICT)
- Regional code: 64.07.13
- Villages: 6

Penyinggahan (Indonesian pronunciation: [pəˈɲiŋɡahan]) is a district of West Kutai Regency, East Kalimantan, Indonesia. As of 2023, it was inhabited by 4,026 people, and currently has a total area of 206.12 km^{2}. Its district seat is located at the village of Penyinggahan Ilir.

Penyinggahan shares borders with Jempang to the south, Muara Pahu to the west, and Kutai Kartanegara (districts of Muara Muntai and Muara Wis) to the east and north.

== History ==
Penyinggahan, hence its name, singgahan, became a stopover for traders travelling between the legendary kingdoms of Baroh (present-day Muara Pahu) and Kota Bangun. Previously, this region had no name. Located between Lake Melintang and Lake Jempang, its inhabitants traditionally worked as farmers or fishermen.

The current district was officially separated from Muara Muntai (now part of Kutai Kartanegara) on 30 May 1965 after being signed by East Kalimantan governor secretary E. Abdoessamad. Previously, 22 local figures requested for its formation on 15 May 1965.

== Governance ==
=== Villages ===
Penyinggahan is divided into the following 6 villages (kampung):

Regional code (Kode wilayah)	Name	Area (km^{2})	Population (2023)	RT (rukun tetangga)
64.07.13.2001	Loa Deras	49.27	487	4
64.07.13.2002	Minta	29.51	810	6
64.07.13.2003	Tanjung Haur	19.27	521	3
64.07.13.2004	Penyinggahan Ilir	26.29	975	6
64.07.13.2005	Penyinggahan Ulu	101.35	936	6
64.07.13.2006	Bakung	9.11	297	2
	Totals	206.12	4,026	27
