= Melak =

- District
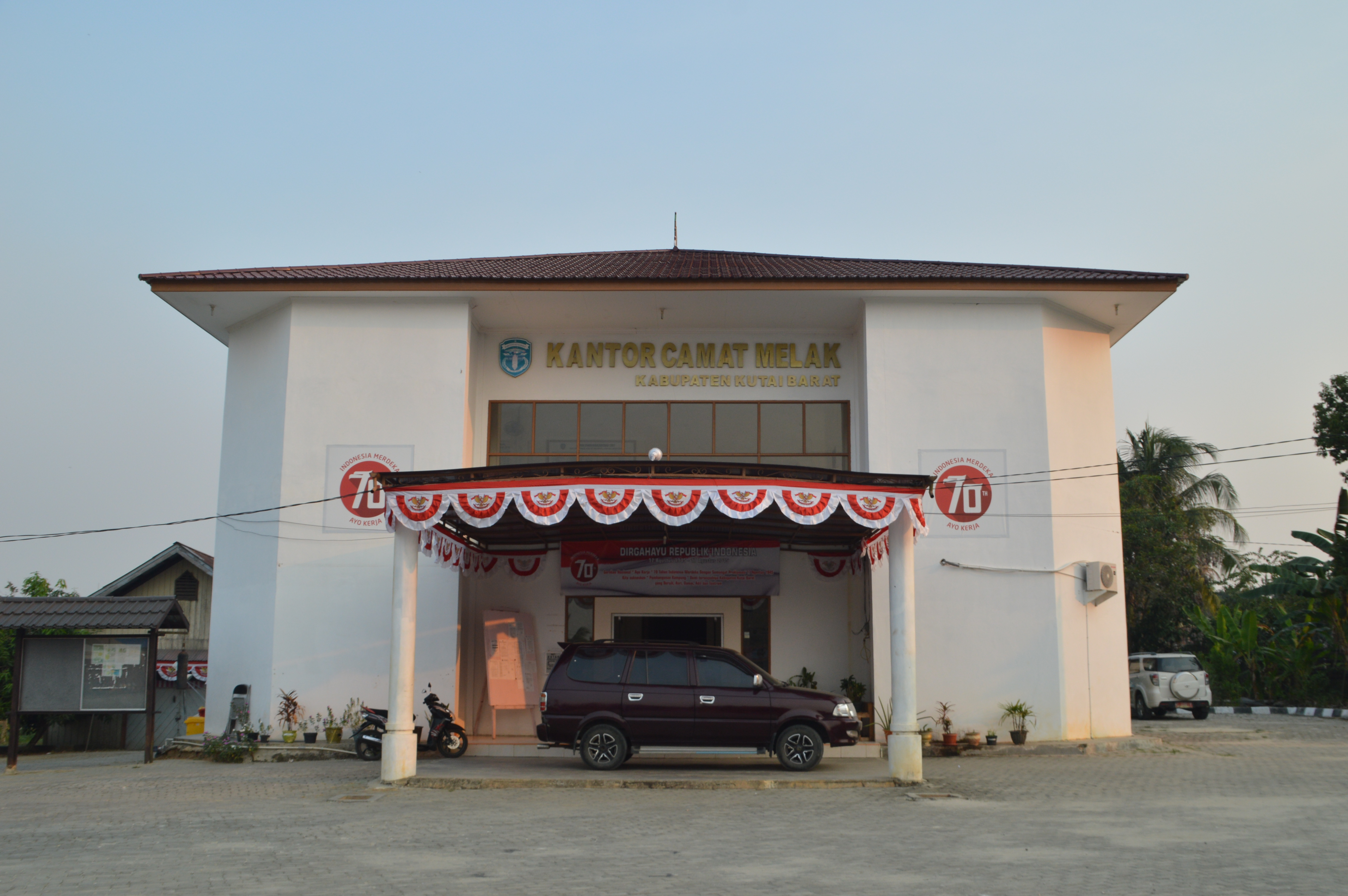
- Melak District Office
- Interactive map of Melak
- Location within East Kalimantan Location within Kalimantan Location within Indonesia
- Coordinates: 0°14′13.941″S 115°48′47.3922″E
- Country: Indonesia
- Province: East Kalimantan
- Regency: West Kutai

Area
  - Total: 179.2 km^{2} (69.2 sq mi)

Population (2022)
  - Total: 16,127
  - Density: 89.99/km^{2} (233.1/sq mi)

Melak is a district (kecamatan) in West Kutai Regency, East Kalimantan, Indonesia. As of 2022, it was inhabited by 16,127 people, and has a total area of 179.2 km^{2}. Its district seat is located at the village of Melak Ulu.

== History ==
On 5 June 2003, Sekolaq Darat (all villages) and Tering (Muyub Aket and Muyub Ilir only) were created as separate districts from Melak.

== Governance ==
=== Villages ===
Tering is divided into the following 4 rural villages (kampung) and 2 urban villages (kelurahan, marked grey):

Regional code (Kode wilayah)	Name	Area (km^{2})	Population (2023)	RT (rukun tetangga)
64.07.06.2001	Empas	60.69	794	2
64.07.06.2002	Empakuq	85.84	434	2
64.07.06.2003	Muara Bunyut	43.17	1,097	4
64.07.06.1006	Melak Ilir	25.5	4,158	15
64.07.06.1011	Melak Ulu	19.28	9,314	33
64.07.06.2012	Muara Benangaq	35.44	450	2
	Totals	270.19	16,247	58
