= GEH =

Geh or GEH may refer to:

== Businesses and organisations ==
- GE Vernova Hitachi Nuclear Energy, an American business
- George Eliot Hospital, Nuneaton, England
- Gesellschaft zur Erhaltung alter und gefährdeter Haustierrassen, a German conservation association

== Language ==
- Ǵ, representing the Pashto letter geh (ږ)
- Hutterite German dialect, spoken in North America (ISO 636-3:geh)

== Other uses ==
- Geh (surname)
- GEH statistic, in road traffic modelling
- Triacylglycerol lipase, an enzyme
