= Long Apari =

District of West Kutai Regency, East Kalimantan

- District
- Interactive map of Long Apari
- Location in Kalimantan and Indonesia Long Apari (Indonesia)
- Coordinates: 1°11′4.56″N 114°15′36.94″E
- Country: Indonesia
- Province: East Kalimantan
- Regency: Mahakam Ulu
- District seat: Tiong Ohang

Government
  - District head (Camat): Petrus Ngo

Area
  - Total: 4,798.03 km^{2} (1,852.53 sq mi)

Population (2023)
  - Total: 4,691
  - Density: 0.9777/km^{2} (2.532/sq mi)
- Time zone: UTC+8 (ICT)
- Postal code: 75769
- Regional code: 64.11.04
- Villages: 10

Long Apari (Indonesian pronunciation: [ˈlɔŋ aˈpari]) is a district of Mahakam Ulu Regency, East Kalimantan, Indonesia. As of 2023, it was inhabited by 4,691 people, and currently has a total area of 4,798.03 km^{2}. Its district seat is located at the village of Tiong Ohang.

The westernmost district of East Kalimantan, it shares border with the Malaysian state of Sarawak (Bukit Mabong) to the north.
