= Ujoh Bilang =

Village in Long Bagun, Mahakam Ulu, East Kalimantan

- Village
- Interactive map of Ujoh Bilang
- Location Ujoh Bilang (Indonesia)
- Coordinates: 0°32′58.56″N 115°15′26.89″E
- Country: Indonesia
- Province: East Kalimantan
- Regency: Mahakam Ulu
- District: Long Bagun

Area
  - Total: 336.83 km^{2} (130.05 sq mi)

Population (2024)
  - Total: 5,474
  - Density: 16.25/km^{2} (42.09/sq mi)
- Time zone: UTC+8 (ICT)
- Regional code: 64.11.01.2006

Ujoh Bilang (Indonesian pronunciation: [ˌudʒɔh ˈbilaŋ]) is a village (desa) within the district of Long Bagun, which serves as the seat of Mahakam Ulu Regency, East Kalimantan, Indonesia. As at 2024, it was inhabited by 5,474 people, and covers a land area of 336.83 km^{2}. Ujoh Bilang consists of 15 rukun tetangga (neighbourhoods).

Ujoh Bilang has been inhabited at least since 1857, and it has seen population influx from multiple ethnic groups, including Long Gelat, Aoheng, Bahau Kayan and Kenyah (all of them are Dayak subgroups). Ujoh Bilang is home to several waterfalls. There are currently plans by the local government to construct an airport for Ujoh Bilang ; its main purpose is to improve local transportation.
