= Fransiskus Xaverius Yapan =

Indonesian politician (born 1958)

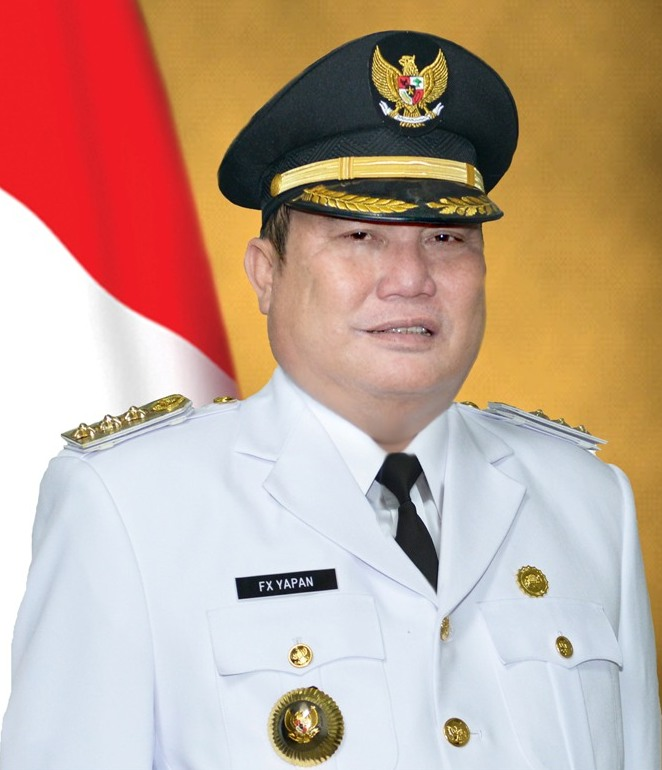

3rd Regent of West Kutai
- In office 20 April 2016 – 20 February 2025
- Governor: Awang Faroek Ishak; Restuardy Daud (act.); Isran Noor; Akmal Malik (act.)
- Deputy: Edyanto Arkan
- Preceded by: Ismail Thomas
- Succeeded by: Frederick Edwin

Personal details
- Born: 18 July 1958 (age 67) West Kutai, East Kalimantan, Indonesia
- Political party: PDI-P
- Spouse(s): Yayuk Seri Rahayu, S.ST.
- Children: 6

Fransiskus Xaverius Yapan (born 18 July 1958) is an Indonesian politician of the Indonesian Democratic Party of Struggle who served as the regent of West Kutai Regency, East Kalimantan, between 2016 and 2025. Prior to becoming regent, he had been part of the regency's municipal council since 2000, and its speaker since 2004.

== Early life ==
Fransiskus Xaverius Yapan was born on 18 July 1958 at the village of Besiq Damai in West Kutai Regency. After graduating from middle school in West Kutai in 1979, he moved to Samarinda where he completed high school at a Catholic school (1982) and obtained his bachelor's degree from the 17 August 1945 University Samarinda (1989).

== Career ==
Yapan for a time worked as a public relations staff at a company before he was elected into the Regional House of Representatives (DPRD) of Kutai Kartanegara Regency in the 1999 election. In 2000, upon the splitting off of West Kutai Regency as its own regency, Yapan became a member of its DPRD instead. In 2004, Yapan was elected Speaker of West Kutai's DPRD, and he would hold this position for three terms.

While he was DPRD speaker, he led the successful electoral campaigns of Ismail Thomas in 2006 and 2011 to become West Kutai's regent, and Thomas in turn would endorse Yapan's candidacy for regent in the 2015 regency election. With Edyanto Arkan as running mate, Yapan won the election with 34,038 votes (41%) in a four-way race. Yapan was sworn in as regent on 20 April 2016. He would be reelected in the 2020 election with 49,141 votes (61.1%), Edyanto Arkan remaining his deputy.

According to Yapan, his tenure's priority was in infrastructure development, particularly roads, bridges, and ship facilities. Around Rp 1 trillion (USD 65 million) in central government funding was allocated to West Kutai's infrastructure development in the 2020-2024 period, during Yapan's tenure. He also supported plans to move the Indonesian capital to Nusantara in East Kalimantan, with West Kutai set to become a satellite region of the new capital. In 2023, he was involved in an incident where his personal driver had an altercation with an oil palm truck driver with Yapan present, with a video going viral on social media and eventually leading to an apology from Yapan.

Yapan is a member of the Indonesian Democratic Party of Struggle, and was the party's chairman in West Kutai until his resignation in 2024. He cited health reasons and his differing support to the party in West Kutai's 2024 regency election. Yapan had endorsed the Hanura–Perindo ticket of Sahadi and Alexander Edmond, while PDI-P supported Frederick Edwin and Nanang Adriani. Alexander Edmond and Frederick Edwin are both sons of Ismail Thomas, Yapan's predecessor, and Edwin would later win the election and succeeded Yapan in 2025.

== Personal life ==
Yapan is a Protestant Christian. He is married to Yayuk Seri Rahayu, and the couple had six children (of which, two had died by 2021).
