= Mahakam languages =

Language of Borneo, Indonesia

Mahakam
- Barito-Mahakam
- Geographic distribution: East Kalimantan, Indonesia
- Linguistic classification: Austronesian: Malayo-Polynesian; (Barito); Mahakam

Language codes
- Glottolog: bari1287

The Mahakam or Barito-Mahakam languages are a couple of closely related Dayak (Austronesian) languages of Borneo:

- Ampanang (now extinct)
- Tunjung
