= Long Bagun =

District of Mahakam Ulu, East Kalimantan

- District
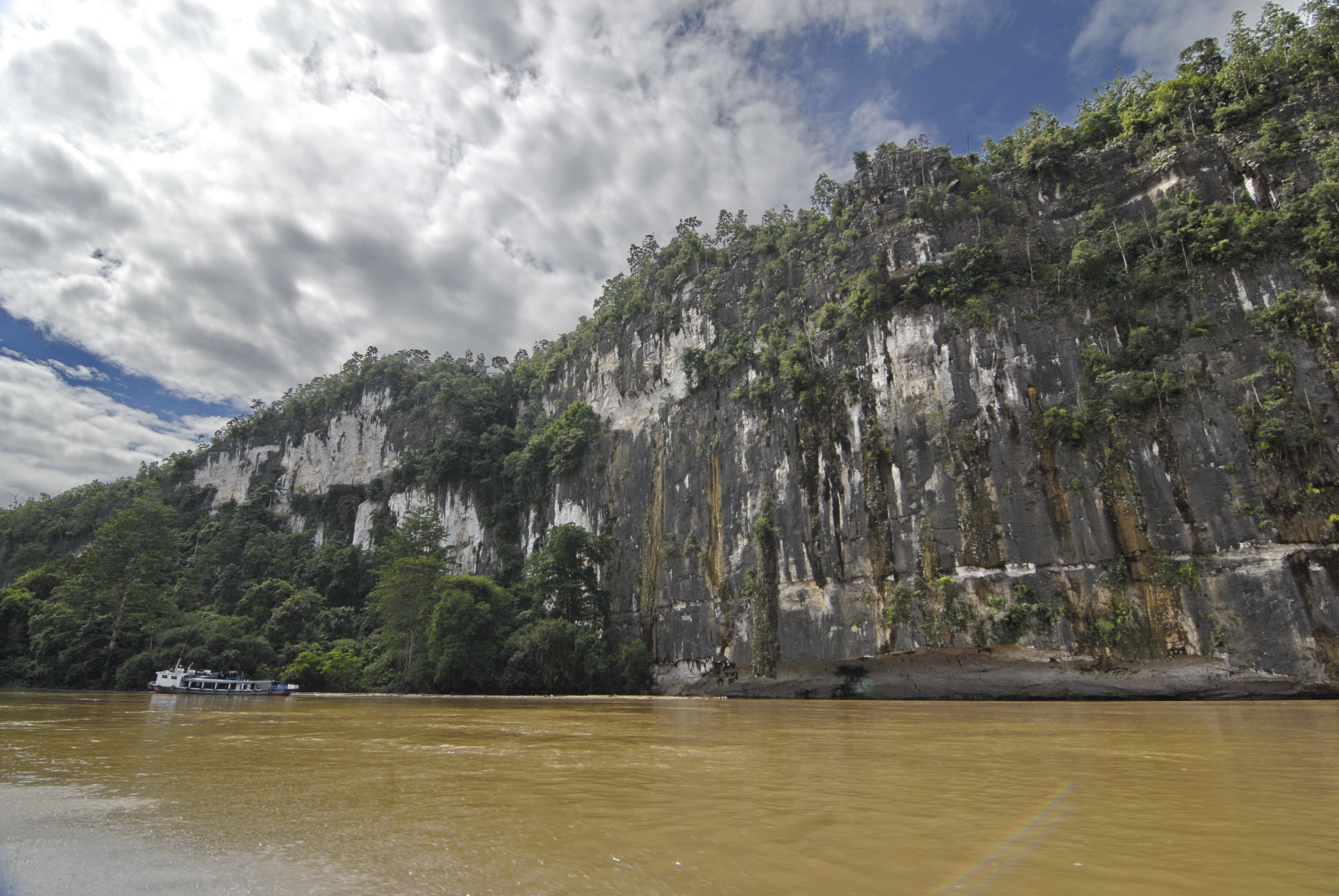
- Wall stones above the Mahakam at Long Melaham
- Interactive map of Long Bagun
- Location Long Bagun (Indonesia)
- Coordinates: 0°32′58.56″N 115°15′26.89″E
- Country: Indonesia
- Province: East Kalimantan
- Regency: Mahakam Ulu
- District seat: Ujoh Bilang

Government
  - District head (camat): Selvanus Sengiang

Area
  - Total: 4,801.22 km^{2} (1,853.76 sq mi)

Population (2024)
  - Total: 16,744
  - Density: 3.4874/km^{2} (9.0324/sq mi)
- Time zone: UTC+8 (ICT)
- Regional code: 64.11.01

Long Bagun (Indonesian pronunciation: [ˈlɔŋ ˈbaɡʊn]) is a district of the Mahakam Ulu Regency, East Kalimantan, Indonesia. As of 2023, it was inhabited by 15,231 people, and currently has the total area of 4,801.22 km^{2}. Its district seat is located at Ujoh Bilang, of which also serves as the regency's capital.

== Governance ==
=== Villages ===
Long Bagun is divided into the following 11 villages (kampung):

Regional code (Kode wilayah)	Name	Area (km^{2})	Population (2024)	Density (2024)	RT (rukun tetangga)
64.11.01.2001	Long Hurai	41.18	437	10.6/km^{2}	2
64.11.01.2002	Long Melaham	102.44	2,198	21.5/km^{2}	5
64.11.01.2003	Mamahak Ilir; Memahak Ilir	638.81	1,541	2.4/km^{2}	5
64.11.01.2004	Mamahak Ulu; Memahak Ulu	996.28	360	0.4/km^{2}	2
64.11.01.2005	Batu Majang	135.54	1,215	9.0/km^{2}	7
64.11.01.2006	Ujoh Bilang	354.73	5,474	15.4/km^{2}	15
64.11.01.2007	Long Bagun Ilir	74.63	1,160	15.5/km^{2}	4
64.11.01.2008	Long Bagun Ulu	567.04	1,693	3.0/km^{2}	6
64.11.01.2009	Batoq Kelo	1,530.76	1,046	0.7/km^{2}	4
64.11.01.2010	Long Merah	311.04	540	1.7/km^{2}	2
64.11.01.2011	Rukun Damai	12.3	993	80.7/km^{2}	5
	Totals	4,801.22	15,231	3.2/km^{2}	58

== Demographics ==
As of 2023, Long Bagun was populated by 15,231 people: 7,172 males and 8,059 females.

=== Religion ===
Religion in Long Bagun (2022)
1. Catholicism (56.7%)
2. Islam (28.5%)
3. Protestantism (14.7%)
4. Hinduism (0.05%)
5. Buddhism (0.01%)

As of 2022, by far the largest religious group in Long Bagun were Catholics (8,899 people), followed by significant minorities including Muslims (4,483), Protestants (2,311 people), Hindus (8 people) and Buddhists (2 people).
