= Sendawar =

Coordinates: 2°11′N 98°23′E

- Regency seat
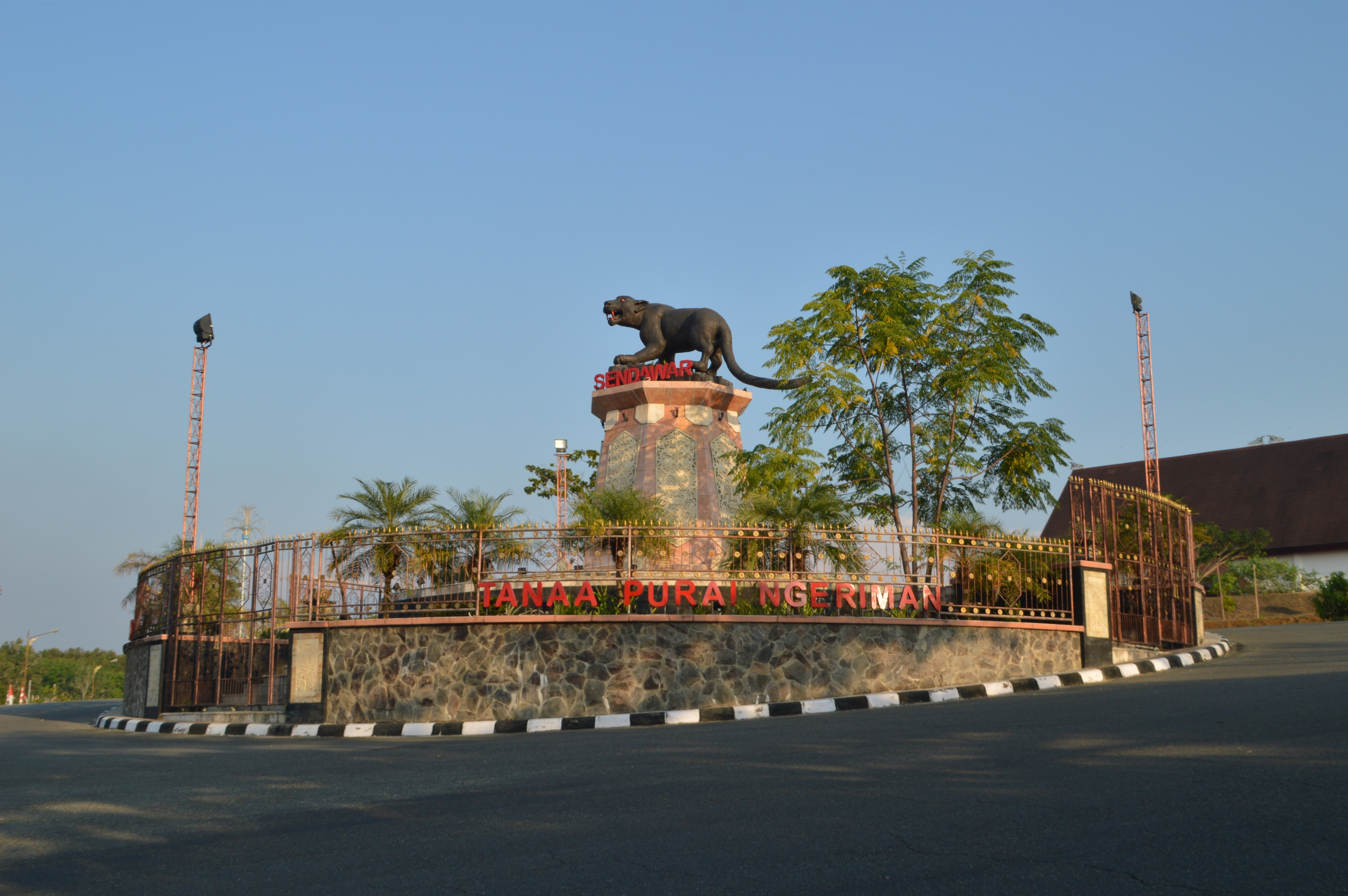
- Clouded Leopard monument in Sendawar
- Interactive map of Sendawar
- Country: Indonesia
- Province: East Kalimantan
- Regency: West Kutai

Area
  - Total: 405.89 km^{2} (156.72 sq mi)

Population (2021)
  - Total: 32,438
  - Density: 79.918/km^{2} (206.99/sq mi)

Sendawar (abbreviated as SDW, Indonesian pronunciation: [sənˈdawar]) is the capital city of West Kutai Regency which is also the center of government and economy of West Kutai Regency.

Administratively, this town, like Sangatta, is only an area, not an independent city, nor is it an independent district. The Sendawar area covers part or all of Barong Tongkok district. However, there is also the name Sendawar village in the Barong Tongkok. Referring to Central Statistics Agency of Indonesia data for West Kutai Regency in 2021, the distance between sub-districts in West Kutai to the district capital, the two sub-districts have a closer distance to the district capital of about 1 km, namely the Barong Tongkok and Simpang Raya. West Kutai government offices, including the bupati's office, are located in the Simpang Raya sub-district.

== Demographics ==
=== Ethnic group ===
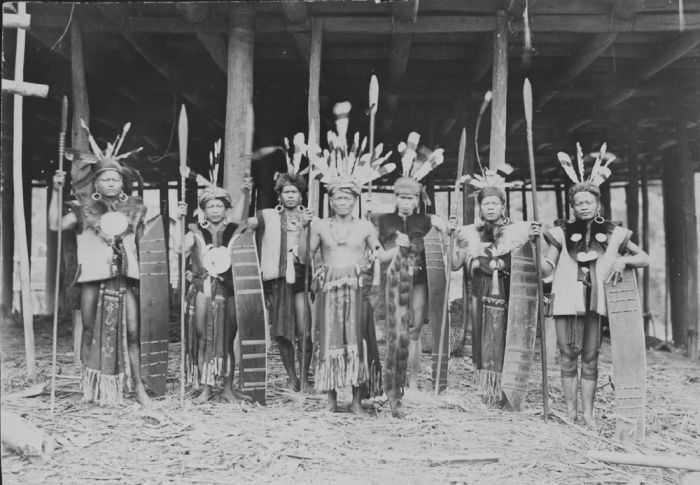
Photo of the Bahau Dayak around 1898–1900.

West Kutai Regency has a diversity of ethnic groups, with the majority coming from the Dayak peoples, the indigenous people of this region. The Dayak itself consists of various sub-ethnic from Kalimantan and West Kutai. Dayak peoples make up 63.90% of the population of West Kutai, with dominant Tunjung as much as 24.20%. Other Dayak ethnics are Benuaq (19.90%), Bahau (9.30%), Kenyah (2.40%), Bentian (2.30%), Bakumpai (1.70%), Penihing or Aoheng (1.70%), Kayan (1.40%), Seputan (0.60%), Bukat (0.20%), and Luangan (0.20%). Another dominant ethnic group from East Kalimantan is Kutai with a total of 15.50%. While other ethnic groups are Javanese (10.70%), Banjar (4.50%), Bugis (3.20%), Batak (0.20%), and other ethnic groups (2.00%).

=== Religion ===
Referring to the population of the Barong Tongkok district, the total population of Sendawar is around 32,438 people, based on data Ministry of Home Affairs in 2021. Then the population is based on the religion adhered to, the majority adheres to Christianity. The size of the population based on religion is Christianity as much as 64.93%, where Protestant 33.19% and Catholic 31.74%. Most of them follow the religion Islam namely 34.86%. As well adherents of religion Hinduism as much as 0.13%, Buddhist 0.03%, and belief 0.05%. For places of worship, there are 65 Protestant churches, 15 Catholic churches, 9 mosques, and 11 prayer rooms (musalla).

== Climate ==
Sendawar has a tropical rainforest climate (Af) with heavy to very heavy rainfall year-round.

Climate data for Sendawar
Month	Jan	Feb	Mar	Apr	May	Jun	Jul	Aug	Sep	Oct	Nov	Dec	Year
Mean daily maximum °C (°F)	29.4 (84.9)	29.7 (85.5)	30.0 (86.0)	30.0 (86.0)	30.2 (86.4)	29.7 (85.5)	29.6 (85.3)	29.9 (85.8)	30.0 (86.0)	30.2 (86.4)	30.0 (86.0)	29.7 (85.5)	29.9 (85.8)
Daily mean °C (°F)	25.9 (78.6)	26.0 (78.8)	26.3 (79.3)	26.3 (79.3)	26.6 (79.9)	26.2 (79.2)	26.0 (78.8)	26.2 (79.2)	26.3 (79.3)	26.4 (79.5)	26.3 (79.3)	26.1 (79.0)	26.2 (79.2)
Mean daily minimum °C (°F)	22.4 (72.3)	22.4 (72.3)	22.6 (72.7)	22.7 (72.9)	23.0 (73.4)	22.7 (72.9)	22.4 (72.3)	22.6 (72.7)	22.7 (72.9)	22.7 (72.9)	22.6 (72.7)	22.5 (72.5)	22.6 (72.7)
Average rainfall mm (inches)	264 (10.4)	281 (11.1)	323 (12.7)	334 (13.1)	287 (11.3)	212 (8.3)	183 (7.2)	186 (7.3)	218 (8.6)	274 (10.8)	319 (12.6)	342 (13.5)	3,223 (126.9)
Source: Climate-Data.org
