= Tunjung language =

Austronesian language spoken in Kalimantan, Indonesia

Tunjung
- Native to: Indonesia
- Region: Kalimantan
- Native speakers: 50,000 (2008)
- Language family: Austronesian: Malayo-Polynesian; Mahakam; Tunjung

Language codes
- ISO 639-3: tjg
- Glottolog: tunj1244

Tunjung, or Tunjung Dayak, is an Austronesian language spoken in the Indonesian province of East Kalimantan. It is the only living member of Mahakam linguistic branch, following the extinction of very poorly attested Ampanang language.

== Phonological shifts ==
Tunjung has distinct features among the greater Barito area languages, and has strengthened the glides *-y- > -j- as well as *-w- > -g-. Even though glide strengthening is common in Borneo, it is uncommon in the geographical area in which Tunjung is spoken and is probably not influenced by neighboring languages.

Tunjung has also devoiced *z to c and has split reflexes of *s, either as Ø or h. Among the Barito languages, only Tunjung reflects the schwa as a in the final syllable.

== Vocabulary ==
Tunjung wordlist (Hudson 1967, via Blust)
English	Tunjung	Notes
hand	aŋaʔ	
left	ulay	
right	tauʔ	
leg/foot	uneŋ	
to walk	calan	
road/path	loroŋ	
to come	moot	
to turn	nencaŋ	
to swim	karaŋoy	
dirty	marotaʔ	
dust	dəbu	loanword
skin	kulit	
back	puŋuŋ	
belly	naiʔ	
bone	lah	
intestines	usiʔ ŋaiʔ	
liver	limpa	
breast	tosoq	
shoulder	bahuq	
to know, be knowledgeable	togaʔ	
to think	pikir	loanword
to fear	bihin	
blood	rahaʔ	
head	kuhuŋ	
neck	lohoŋ	
hair	alaw	
nose	uruŋ	
to breathe	ŋasaŋ	
to sniff, smell	karak	
mouth	oncoŋ	
tooth	kəsiŋ	
tongue	celaʔ	
to laugh	tagaʔ	
to cry	naŋi	
to vomit	notaʔ	
to spit	məcuh	
to eat	kuman	
to cook	əncak	
to drink	muruʔ	
to bite	ŋeket	
to suck	mosoʔ	
ear	neneŋ	
to hear	kəheneŋ	
eye	uee	
to see	neaw	
to sleep	tiro	
to lie down	tempoŋ	
to dream	ñùßí	
to sit	dacuŋ	
to stand	tege	
person/human being	ulun	
man/male	lihaʔ	
woman/female	waweʔ	
child	tuhiʔ	
husband	wanaʔ	
wife	sagan	
mother	meʔ	
father	maʔ	
house	dapeq	
thatch/roof	sapaw jemiaq	
name	nama	loanword
to say	bagahaʔ	
rope	taliʔ	
to tie up, fasten	məcat	
to sew	ŋabet	
needle	cahumph	
to hunt	mahaw	
to shoot	nemak	
to stab, pierce	mancak	
to hit	bajagur	
to steal	noq dadak	
to kill	pakateʔ	
to die, be dead	mateʔ	
to live, be alive	bəlum	
to scratch	ŋərogot	
to cut, hack	motok	
stick/wood	leŋan	
to split	məkaʔ	
sharp	masuk	
dull, blunt	kacar	
