= Tering, West Kutai =

Tering
- District
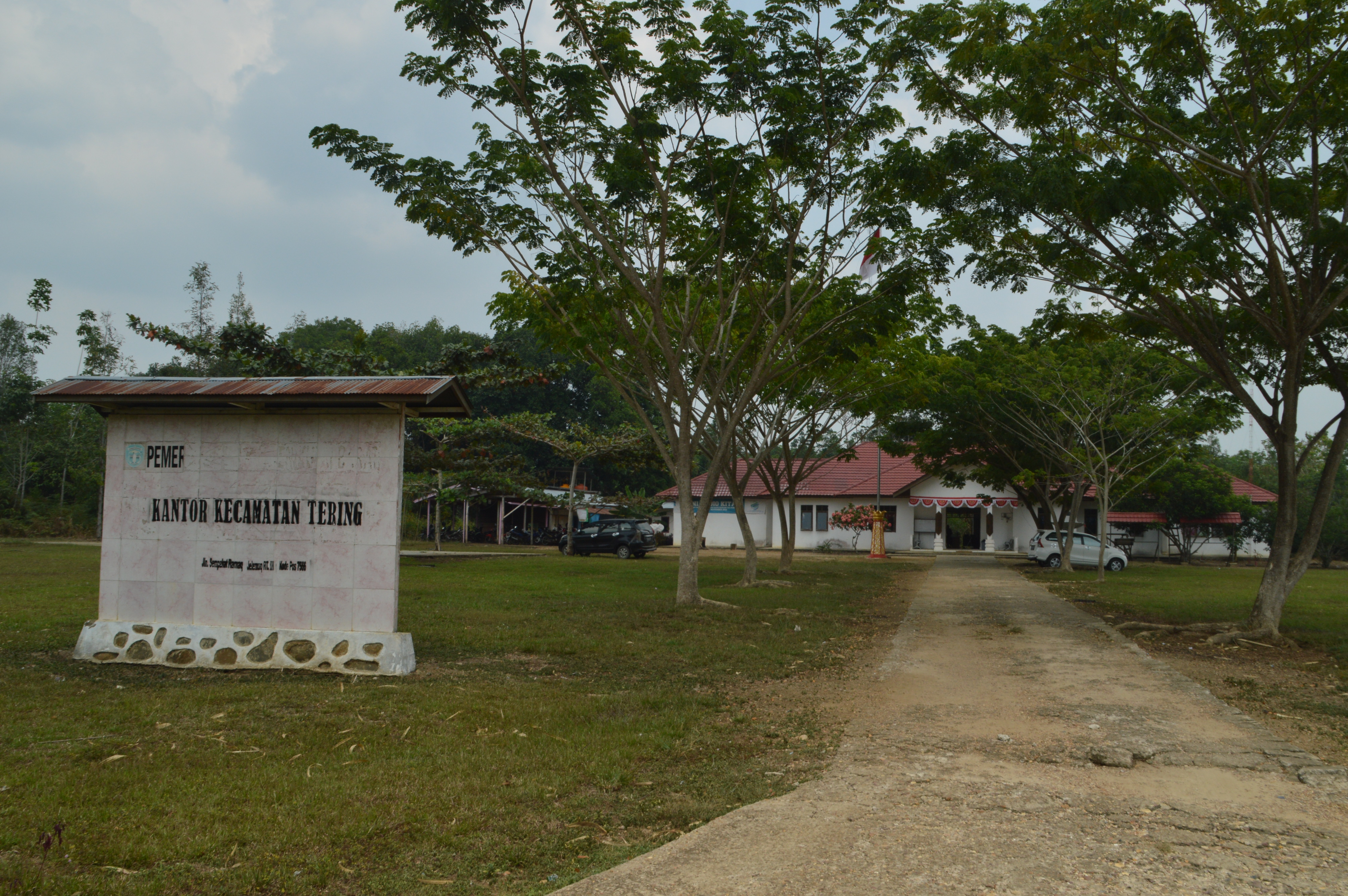
- Tering District Office
- Interactive map of Tering
- Location within East Kalimantan Location within Kalimantan Location within Indonesia
- Coordinates: 0°5′4.1456″S 115°39′42.5696″E
- Country: Indonesia
- Province: East Kalimantan
- Regency: West Kutai

Area
  - Total: 2,140.3 km^{2} (826.4 sq mi)

Population (2023)
  - Total: 11,223
  - Density: 5.2437/km^{2} (13.581/sq mi)

Tering (Indonesian pronunciation: [t̪əˈrɪŋ]) is a district (kecamatan) in West Kutai Regency, East Kalimantan, Indonesia. As of 2023, it was inhabited by 11,223 people, and currently has a total area of 341.8 km^{2}. Its district seat is located at the village of Linggang Jelemuq (or Jelemuq).

The district was split off from parts of Long Iram (the rest of villages) and Melak (Muyub Aket and Muyub Ilir only) on 5 June 2003.

== Governance ==
=== Villages ===
Tering is divided into the following 6 villages (kampung):

Regional code (Kode wilayah)	Name	Area (km^{2})	Population (2023)	RT (rukun tetangga)
64.07.19.2001	Tering Baru	64.08	213	3
64.07.19.2002	Tering Lama	137.32	651	6
64.07.19.2003	(Linggang) Tering Seberang	336.18	2,167	6
64.07.19.2004	Tukul	43.59	1,007	4
64.07.19.2005	(Linggang) Kelubaq	366.19	689	3
64.07.19.2006	(Linggang) Purworejo	228.87	1,076	4
64.07.19.2007	(Linggang) Jelemuq	45.77	796	4
64.07.19.2008	Kelian Dalam	64.08	297	3
64.07.19.2009	(Linggang) Muara Mujan	164.78	297	6
64.07.19.2010	Muyub Ulu	183.09	320	2
64.07.19.2011	Muyub Aket	63.51	417	2
64.07.19.2013	(Linggang) Muyub Ilir	52.16	550	3
64.07.19.2014	Gabung Baru	24.54	202	2
64.07.19.2015	(Linggang) Banjarejo	228.87	448	4
64.07.19.2016	Tering Lama Ulu	137.32	530	4
	Totals	2,140.35	11,223	56
