= Mahakam Ulu Regency =

Regency in East Kalimantan, Indonesia

Mahakam Ulu Regency Kabupaten Mahakam Ulu
- Regency
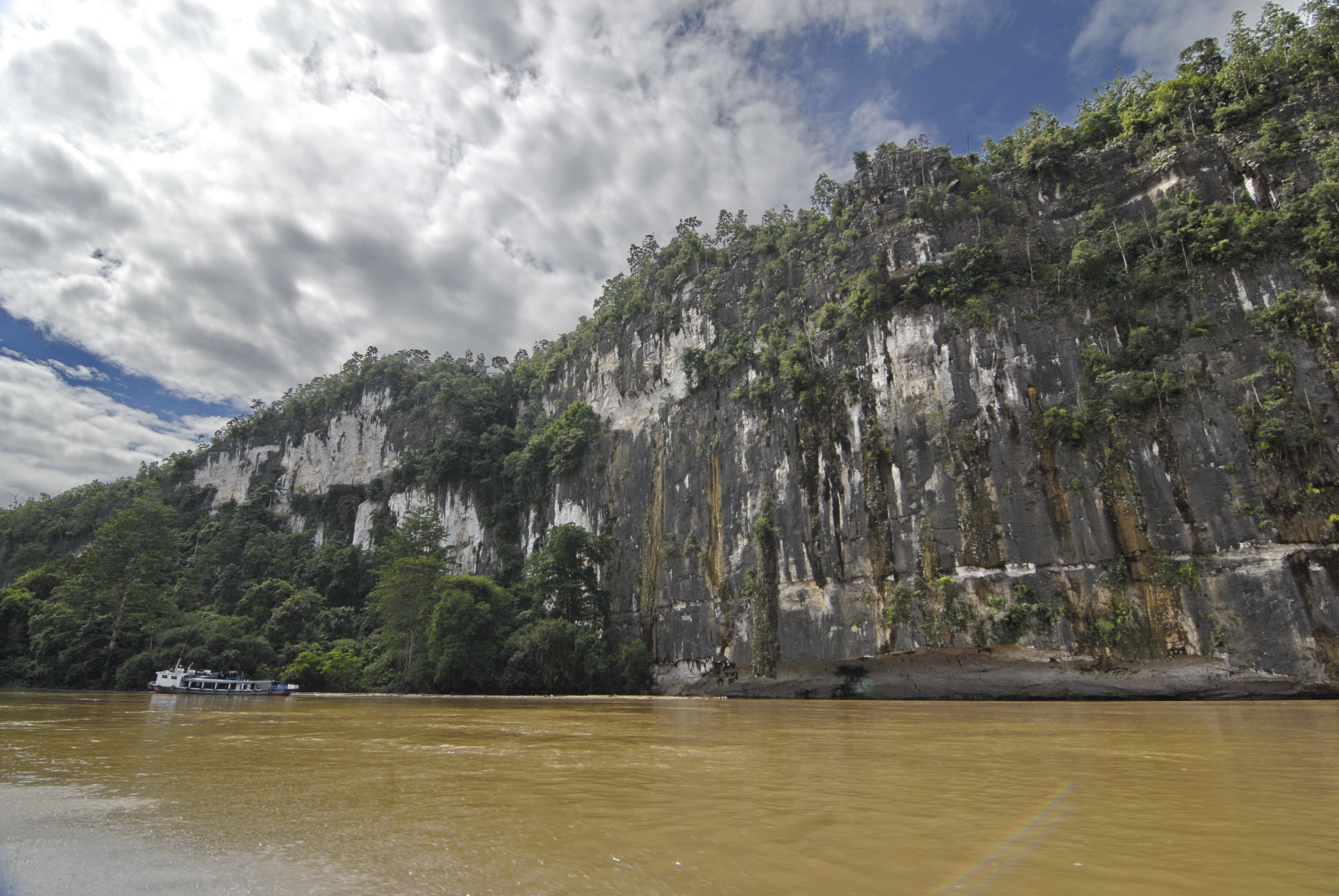
- A cliff above the Mahakam river

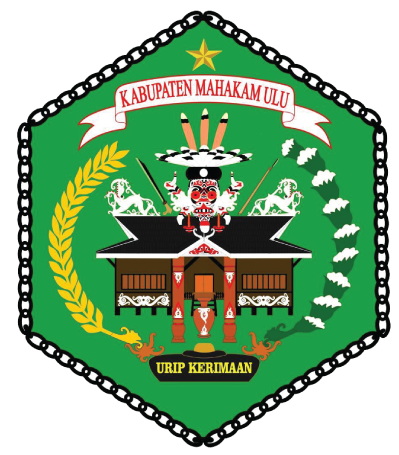
- Seal
- Motto(s): Urip Kerimaan (Living with Abundant Blessings)
- Location within East Kalimantan

- Location in Kalimantan and Indonesia Mahakam Ulu Regency (Indonesia)
- Coordinates: 0.5°N 115.28°E
- Country: Indonesia
- Province: East Kalimantan
- Capital: Ujoh Bilang
- Established: 14 December 2012

Government
  - Regent: Angela Idang Belawan
  - Vice Regent: Suhuk

Area
  - Total: 5,913.1 sq mi (15,314.8 km^{2})

Population (mid 2025 estimate)
  - Total: 39,962
  - Density: 6.7582/sq mi (2.6094/km^{2})
- Time zone: UTC+8 (ICST)
- Area code: (+62) 545
- HDI (2022): ▲0.687 (Medium)
- Website: mahakamulukab.go.id

Mahakam Ulu Regency (Indonesian pronunciation: [maˈhakam ˈulu], lit. 'Upper Mahakam') is a regency (kabupaten) in the province of East Kalimantan, Indonesia. As the name implies, it comprises the upper valley of the Mahakam River. It covers a land area of 15,314.8 km^{2}. The regency was established on 14 December 2012, formed from the former northern districts of West Kutai Regency. The districts now forming the regency held a combined population of 24,994 at the 2010 Census; the population for the new regency at the 2020 Census was 32,513; the official estimate as at mid 2025 was 39,962 (comprising 21,328 males and 18,634 females). The administrative capital is at Ujoh Bilang, which had 5,474 inhabitants as at mid 2024.

Mahakam Ulu shares borders with Kapuas Hulu (West Kalimantan) to the west; Murung Raya, North Barito (Central Kalimantan), and West Kutai to the south, Kutai Kartanegara to the east, and Malinau to the north. It is also the only regency in East Kalimantan to share an international land border with the Malaysian state of Sarawak (Kapit), to the north. Mahakam Ulu is also notorious for being geographically isolated from the rest of East Kalimantan. As a result, the public services and transportation access are still minimal.

== Administrative districts ==
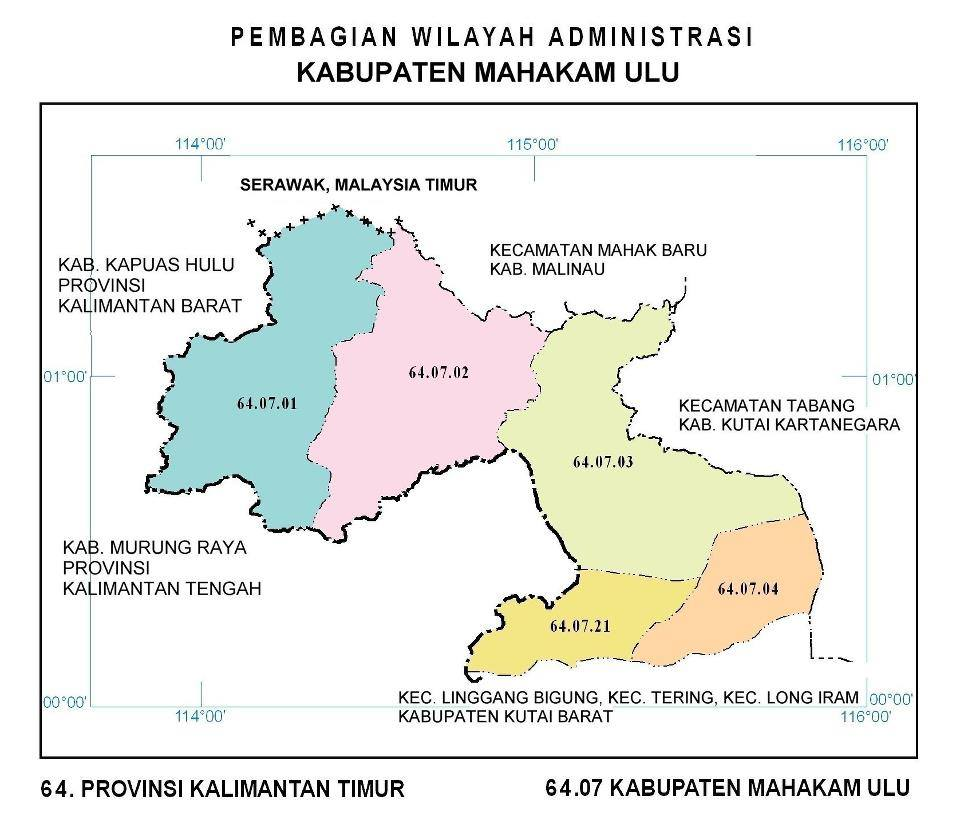
Map of districts in Mahakam Ulu

The regency is divided into five districts (kecamatan), tabulated below with their areas and their populations at the 2010 Census and 2020 Census, together with the official estimates as at mid 2025.

Notable settlements include the twin villages of Tiong Ohang and Tiong Bu'u in Long Apari District. The table also includes the locations of the district administrative centres, the number of administrative villages (all classed as kampung or desa) in each district, and its post code.

Kode Wilayah	Name of District (kecamatan)	Area in km^{2}	Pop'n Census 2010	Pop'n Census 2020	Pop'n Estimate mid 2025	Admin centre	No. of villages	Post code
64.11.03	Laham	901.8	2,275	2,749	3,289	Laham	5	75779
64.11.02	Long Hubung	530.9	6,405	8,604	9,412	Long Hubung	11	75770
64.11.01	Long Bagun	4,971.2	7,886	14,462	17,017	Ujoh Bilang	11	75767
64.11.05	Long Pahangai	3,420.2	4,326	4,978	5,406	Long Pahangai	13	75768
64.11.04	Long Apari	5,490.7	4,102	4,217	4,748	Long Ohang	10	75769
	Totals	15,314.8	24,994	35,010	39,962	Ujoh Bilang	50	
