= West Kutai Regency =

Regency in East Kalimantan, Indonesia

West Kutai Regency Kabupaten Kutai Barat
- Regency
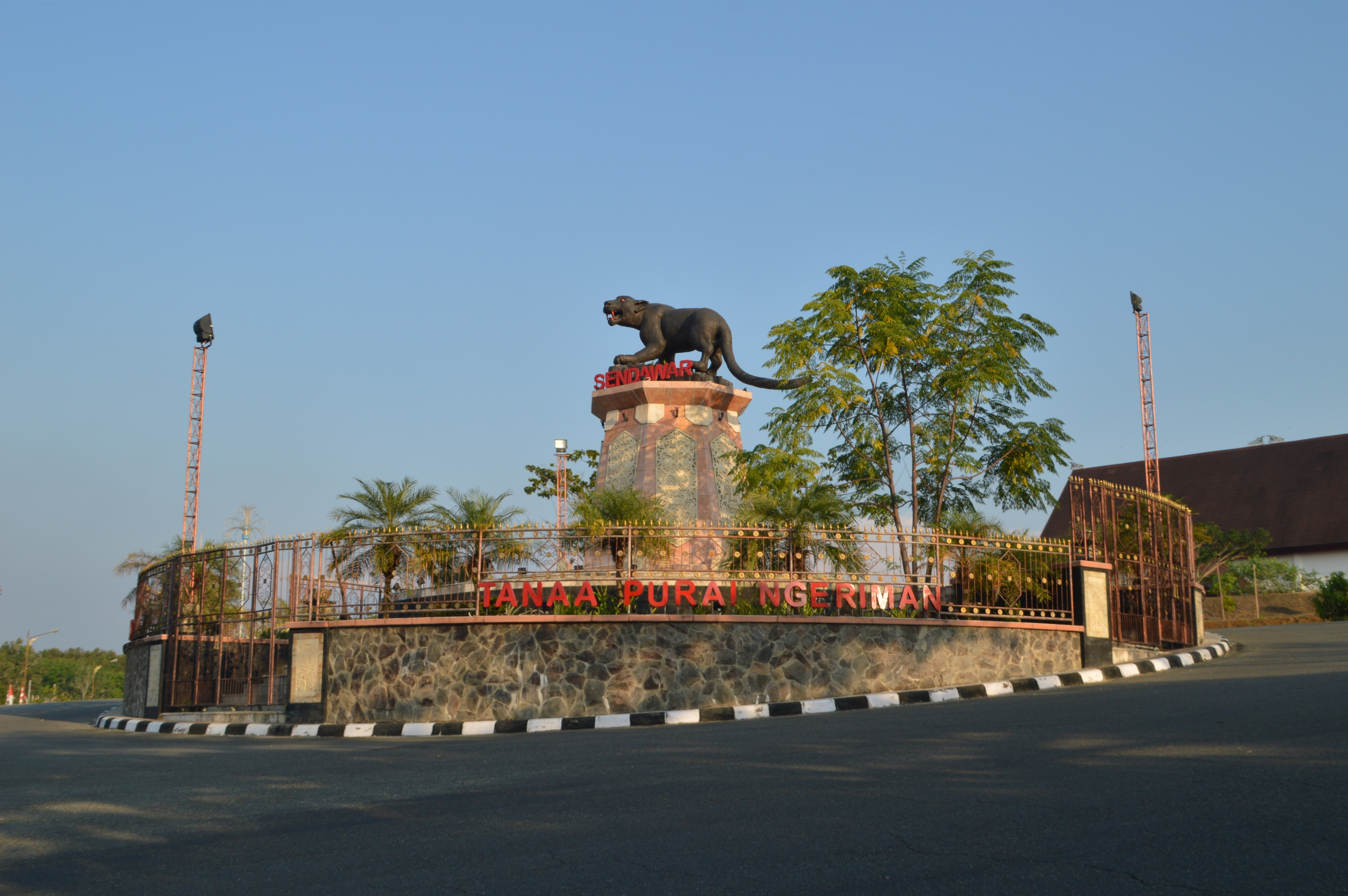
- Tugu Macan (Tiger Monument)

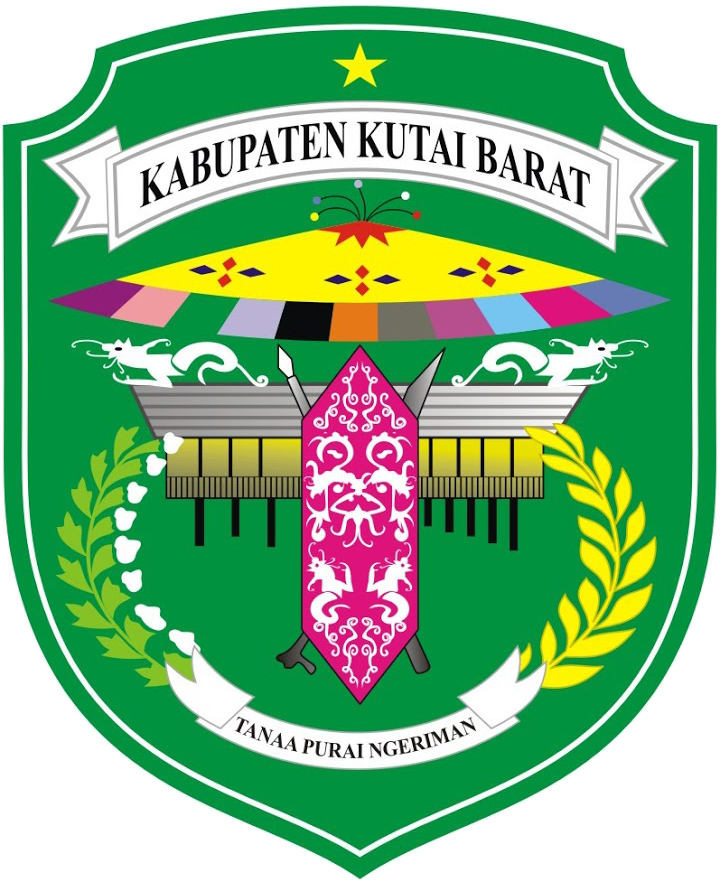
- Coat of arms

- Location within East Kalimantan

- Location in Kalimantan and Indonesia West Kutai Regency (Indonesia)
- Coordinates: 0°30′42″S 115°46′38″E
- Country: Indonesia
- Region: Kalimantan
- Province: East Kalimantan
- Capital: Sendawar

Government
  - Regent: Frederick Edwin
  - Vice Regent: Nanang Adriani

Area
  - Total: 20,381.61 km^{2} (7,869.38 sq mi)

Population (mid 2025 estimate)
  - Total: 188,163
  - Density: 9.23200/km^{2} (23.9108/sq mi)
- Time zone: UTC+8 (ICST)
- Area code: (+62) 545
- Website: kutaibaratkab.go.id

West Kutai Regency (Indonesian: Kabupaten Kutai Barat) is a regency (kabupaten) in the Indonesian province of East Kalimantan. It previously covered a much greater area, with a population of 165,091 at the 2010 Census, but on 11 January 2013 the five northernmost districts were split off to form a new Mahakam Ulu Regency; the residual area of West Kutai Regency is 20,381.61 km^{2}, and it had a population of 140,097 at the 2010 Census, and 165,938 at the 2020 Census; the official estimate as at mid 2025 was 188,163 (comprising 98,861 males and 89,302 females). The town of Sendawar is the administrative capital.

== History ==
The regency was split off from Kutai Regency officially on 4 October 1999, with Rama Alexander Asia becoming its first regent.

== Administrative districts ==
Following the removal of the northern five districts in December 2012 to form the new Mahakam Ulu Regency, the residual West Kutai Regency is divided into sixteen districts (kecamatan), tabulated below with their areas and their 2010 and 2020 Census populations, together with the official estimates as at mid 2025. The table also includes the locations of the district administrative centres, the number of administrative villages (totaling 190 rural kampung or desa, and 4 urban kelurahan) in each district, and its postal codes.

Kode Wilayah	Name of District (kecamatan)	Area in km^{2}	Pop'n Census 2010	Pop'n Census 2020	Pop'n Estimate mid 2025	Admin centre	No. of villages	Post codes
64.07.12	Bongan	2,305.31	8,997	10,499	12,529	Muara Kendang	16	75772
64.07.11	Jempang	744.47	11,279	11,211	12,751	Tanjung Isuy	12	75773
64.07.13	Penyinggahan	192.08	3,904	3,815	4,104	Penyinggahan Ilir	6	75763
64.07.10	Muara Pahu	1,110.64	8,272	8,344	9,195	Tanjung Laor	12	75774
64.07.17	Siluq Ngurai	1,629.10	4,292	5,880	6,791	Muhur	16	75771
64.07.09	Muara Lawa	436.56	6,483	7,033	8,196	Muara Lawa	8	75775
64.07.14	Bentian Besar	1,287.86	3,093	3,213	3,708	Dilang Puti	9	75778
64.07.08	Damai	2,025.53	8,476	10,549	11,938	Damai Kota	17	75777
64.07.16	Nyuatan	1,312.62	5,348	6,357	7,127	Dempar	10	75776 & 75777
64.07.07	Barong Tongkok	430.58	23,935	31,746	37,801	Barong Tongkok	21 ^{(a)}	75776
64.07.15	Linggang Bigung	5,718.07	13,712	15,843	17,079	Linggang Bigung	11	75576
64.07.06	Melak	179.11	10,596	15,041	16,696	Melak Ilir	6 ^{(b)}	75765
64.07.20	Sekolaq Darat	48.94	8,394	10,301	11,606	Sekolaq Darat	8	75764
64.07.18	Mook Manaar; Bulatn	960.57	7,478	8,409	9,343	Gunung Rampah	16	75765 ^{(c)}
64.07.05	Long Iram ^{(d)}	1,657.95	6,407	7,184	7,869	Long Iram Kota	11	75766
64.07.19	Tering	342.22	9,431	10,513	11,430	Tering Lama	15	75760
	Totals	20,381.61	140,097	165,918	188,163	Sendawar	194	

Notes: (a) includes 2 kelurahan - Barong Tongkok and Simpang Raya. (b) includes 2 kelurahan - Melak Ilir and Melak Ulu.
(c) except the four villages of Abit, Muara Jawaq, Rembayan and Tondah (which share a postcode of 75774). (d) includes the riverine island of Pulau Kualan.
