= West Bontang =

District of Bontang, East Kalimantan

West Bontang Bontang Barat
- District
- Interactive map of West Bontang
- Location in Kalimantan and Indonesia West Bontang (Indonesia)
- Coordinates: 0°7′55.96043″N 117°27′34.23092″E
- Country: Indonesia
- Province: East Kalimantan
- City: Bontang
- Established: 16 July 1999

Government
  - District head (Camat): Ida Idris

Area
  - Total: 17.94 km^{2} (6.93 sq mi)

Population (2024)
  - Total: 31,634
  - Density: 1,763/km^{2} (4,567/sq mi)
- Time zone: UTC+8 (ICT)
- Regional code: 64.74.03
- Villages: 3

West Bontang (Indonesian: Bontang Barat, Indonesian pronunciation: [ˌbon̪t̪aŋ ˈbarat̪̚]) is an admnistrative district (kecamatan) in the city of Bontang, in East Kalimantan Province of Indonesia. It covers a land area of 17.94 km^{2} and, as at mid 2025, it was inhabited by 31,634 people. The district seat is located at the village of Kanaan.

The three villages were separated on 16 July 1999 from North Bontang and South Bontang (Kanaan only) to create a third district for the city. West Bontang shares borders with Teluk Pandan District (of East Kutai Regency) to the west and north, with North Bontang to the east, and with South Bontang to the south.

== Governance ==
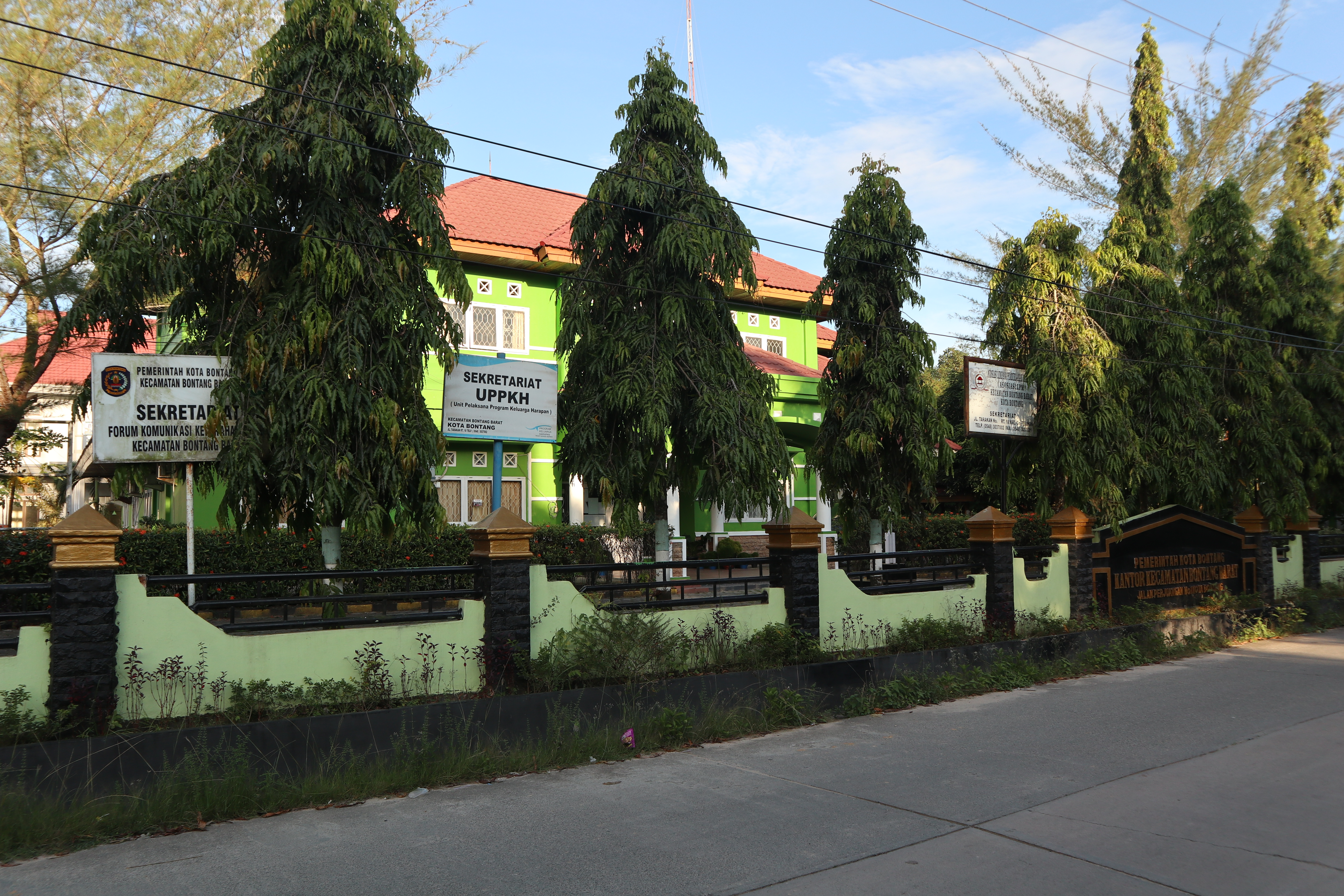
District head office at Kanaan, South Bontang.

=== Villages ===
West Bontang is divided into the following three urban villages (kelurahan), and the district seat is marked bold:

| Regional code | Village name | Area (km^{2}) | Pop'n 2025 | RT (rukun tetangga) |
|---|---|---|---|---|
| 64.74.03.1001 | Belimbing | 9.59 | 11,719 | 12 |
| 64.74.03.1002 | Gunung Telihan; Telihan | 2.29 | 14,440 | 30 |
| 64.74.03.1003 | **Kanaan** | 6.05 | 5,077 | 51 |
| | Totals | 17.94 | 31,236 | 93 |
