= BXT =

BXT may refer to:

- Bamanhat railway station (Indian Railways station code: BXT), a railway station in West Bengal, India
- PT Badak Bontang Airport (IATA: BXT), a private airport in Bontang, East Kalimantan, Indonesia
- Buffalo eXtreme, a basketball team in Buffalo, New York
