= WALC (disambiguation) =

WALC is a radio station (100.5 FM) in Charleston, South Carolina.

WALC may also refer to:

- PT Badak Bontang Airport, an Indonesian public airport (ICAO code: WALC)
- Wilderness Arts and Literacy Collaborative, a co-curricular academic pathway at Balboa High School
