= Beras Basah Island =

Island in Indonesia

Beras Basah
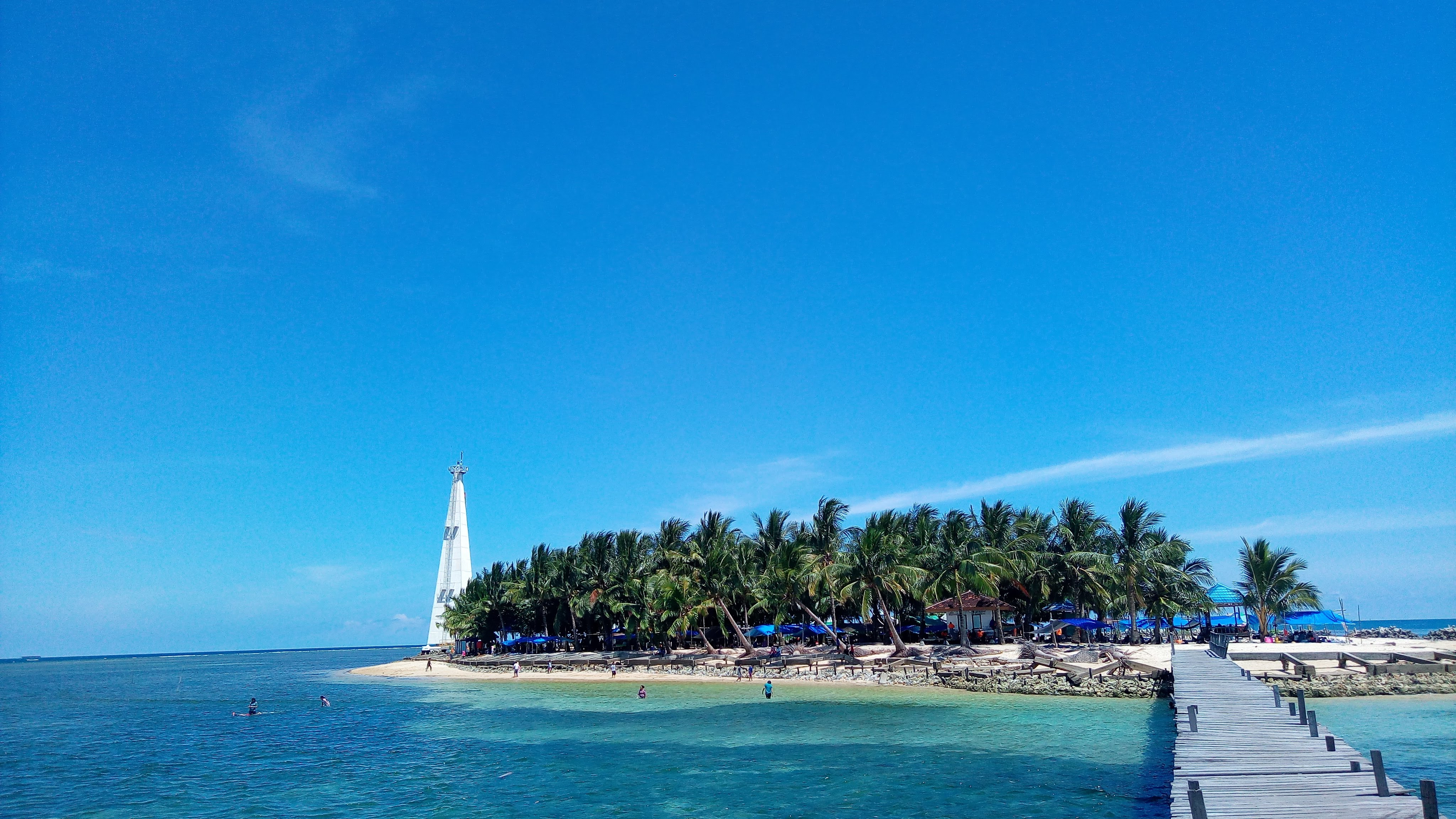
- Beras Basah Island at noon

- Location within Kalimantan Location within Indonesia

Geography
- Location: Makassar Strait
- Coordinates: 0°03′51″N 117°33′32″E
- Area: 0.01 km^{2} (0.0039 sq mi)
- Highest elevation: 3 m (10 ft)

Administration
- Indonesia
- Province: East Kalimantan
- City: Bontang

Demographics
- Population: 11

Beras Basah Island is a small island located in the Straits of Makassar and approximately 10 kilometers (6.2 mi) east of the coast of Borneo. Administratively, this island is under the City of Bontang government and the Province of East Kalimantan. The island is known to be a tourist destination as a dive site that provides tropical underwater life.

== Etymology and history ==
The origin name of Beras Basah according to local folklore comes from the Indonesian words Beras (rice) and Basah (wet). Once upon a time, there was a ship belonging to the Sultanate of Kutai that was sailing in the Straits of Makassar. The ship carries food which includes rice. The ship arrived - suddenly sank and spilled its luggage. Because the waters where the shipwreck is shallow, the ship's congregation, which is mostly rice, does not sink but appears partly like a mound. Over time the rice mound turns into a white sand island like rice which is always wet because it is surrounded by the ocean.

== Transportation access ==
To be able to visit this island there are several accesses which all come from several piers or ports from Bontang. The fastest access is via Marina Beach of Badak NGL pier by using a speed boat which takes approximately fifteen minutes. Alternative access through Tanjung Limau and Tanjung Laut docks using small motorized boats that take approximately one hour.

== See also ==
- Bontang
- Makassar Strait
- List of islands of Indonesia
