= PKTV =

PKTV may refer to:

- Pillaiyar Theru Kadaisi Veedu, a 2011 Indian film
- Publik Khatulistiwa TV, an Indonesian television channel
