= Publik Khatulistiwa TV =

PKTV
- Gerece' Beneh

Bontang, East Kalimantan; Indonesia
- Channels: Digital: 47 UHF

Programming
- Affiliations: Independent

Ownership
- Owner: Pupuk Kaltim via PT Khatulistiwa Media (2001–); Retina (1998–2001)
- Sister stations: eSKa 103.9 FM / PM3FMR

History
- Founded: 31 March 1998
- Former channel number: 12 VHF/26 UHF (analog)
- Former affiliations: City TV Network (2008–2014); TV Edukasi (2004–2023); BeritaSatu (201?–2020); TV Tempo (2020–2024)

Technical information
- Licensing authority: Kementerian Komunikasi dan Informatika Republik Indonesia

Links
- Website: pktvkaltim.com

Publik Khatulistiwa TV (lit. 'Equator Public TV', abbreviated as PKTV), is a local television station based in Bontang, East Kalimantan, Indonesia. It is owned by state-owned manufacturer of fertilizers Pupuk Kaltim, and it is one of two local TV channels that have broadcast in Bontang, the other one was the now-defunct LNGTV (owned by Badak LNG), founded two years earlier in 1996.

== History ==
PKTV, then known as Pupuk Kaltim TV, was first started as a community cable TV station that could be only watched by Pupuk Kaltim employees on 31 March 1998, with its first broadcast being a live match between PS Pupuk Kaltim against Persebaya Surabaya during 1997–98 Liga Indonesia Premier Division. Prior to its foundation, the preparations were done at Mandiri Video Productions, Yogyakarta in March 1996, and a comparative study was done at Caltex TV Rumbai, Pekanbaru in November 1997. PKTV was originally managed by Retina (production house owned by the Baiturrahman Foundation). PKTV claims to be the first local TV station in Indonesia.

PKTV was later transformed into its current form as a limited company, as PT Khatulistiwa Media, by notarial act no. 21 by J. Frans De Lannoy on 20 November 2001 and legalized a year later on 6 September 2002. When the change took effect, its initial capital was only IDR 80 million, but PKTV had absorbed the remaining assets of Retina (its former parent company), including the broadcasting utilities.

In 2010, PKTV, then part of City TV Network, obtained broadcast rights for 2010–11 season of National Basketball Association and ASEAN Basketball League, along with Jak TV and 11 other local stations. PKTV changed its logo on 2 April 2020.
