= North Bontang =

District of Bontang, East Kalimantan

North Bontang Bontang Utara
- District
- Interactive map of North Bontang
- Location in Kalimantan and Indonesia North Bontang (Indonesia)
- Coordinates: 0°10′12″N 117°27′6″E
- Country: Indonesia
- Province: East Kalimantan
- City: Bontang
- Established: 1 December 1989

Government
  - District head (Camat): Muhammad Nur

Area
  - Total: 31.86 km^{2} (12.30 sq mi)

Population (2025)
  - Total: 90,472
  - Density: 2,840/km^{2} (7,355/sq mi)
- Time zone: UTC+8 (ICT)
- Regional code: 64.74.01
- Villages: 6

North Bontang (Indonesian: Bontang Utara, Indonesian pronunciation: [ˈbɔntaŋ uˈtara]) is a district of the city of Bontang, in East Kalimantan Province of Indonesia. It covers a land area of 31.86 km^{2}, and as at mid 2025, it was inhabited by 90,472 people. Its district centre is located in the village of Bontang Baru.

The district was separated on 1 December 1989 from the former district of Bontang. On 16 July 1999, a new West Bontang District was formed out of the western parts of the district. North Bontang shares borders with Teluk Pandan District (of East Kutai Regency) to the north, with Teluk Pandan and West Bontang to the west, and with South Bontang District to the south.

== Governance ==
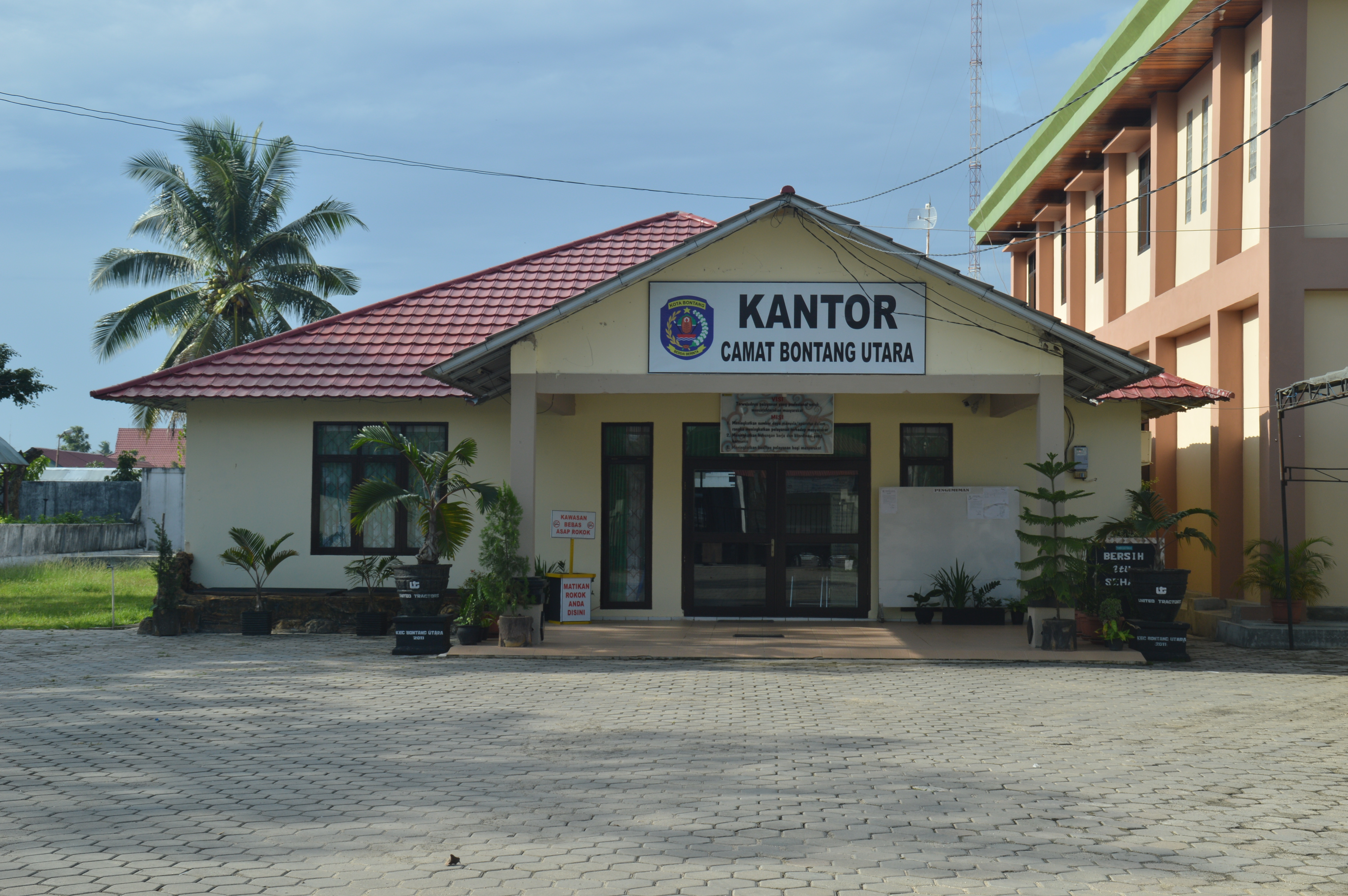
District head office at Bontang Baru, North Bontang.

=== Villages ===
North Bontang is divided into the following six urban villages (kelurahan), and the district seat is marked bold:

Regional code (Kode wilayah)	Name	Area (km^{2})	Pop'n (2023)	RT (rukun tetangga)
64.74.01.1001	Bontang Kuala	8.94	7,458	20
64.74.01.1002	**Bontang Baru**	2.22	12,719	28
64.74.01.1003	Loktuan; Lok Tuan	3.35	24,075	52
64.74.01.1004	Guntung	11.35	9,967	18
64.74.01.1005	Gunung Elai	5.02	15,481	45
64.74.01.1006	Api-Api	2.15	17,992	42
	Totals	33.03	87,692	205
