= PT Badak Bontang Airport =

PT Badak Bontang Airport Lapangan Terbang PT Badak
- IATA: BXT; ICAO: WALC

Summary
- Airport type: Private
- Owner: Badak LNG
- Operator: Badak LNG
- Serves: Bontang
- Location: Bontang, East Kalimantan, Indonesia
- Elevation AMSL: 49 ft (15 m)
- Coordinates: 00°07′17.98″N 117°28′35.66″E

Map
- Location of airport in Indonesia

Runways
Direction	Length		Surface
Direction	ft	m	Surface
04/22	3,280	1,000	Asphalt

PT Badak Bontang Airport (IATA: BXT, ICAO: WALC formerly WRLC), is a private airport in Bontang, East Kalimantan, Indonesia. This airport is managed by the state liquefied natural gas company Badak LNG, a subsidiary of Pertamina. Its distance from the town center is about 1 kilometer.

PT Badak Bontang Airport is served by one de Havilland Canada Dash-7 and one ATR-42-500 Indonesia Air Transport. The Dash-7 is owned by Pupuk Kalimantan Timur (PK-PKT), and the ATR-42-500 is chartered by Badak LNG (PK-THT). PK-THT is the world's largest LNG producer.

== Accidents and incidents ==
- In November 1982, Indonesian Aerospace 212-100 PK-DCR of Deraya Air Taxi and PT Pupuk Kaltim was damaged when approaching Bontang. There were no fatalities.
