= Bontang =

City in East Kalimantan, Indonesia

- City
- City of Bontang; Kota Bontang
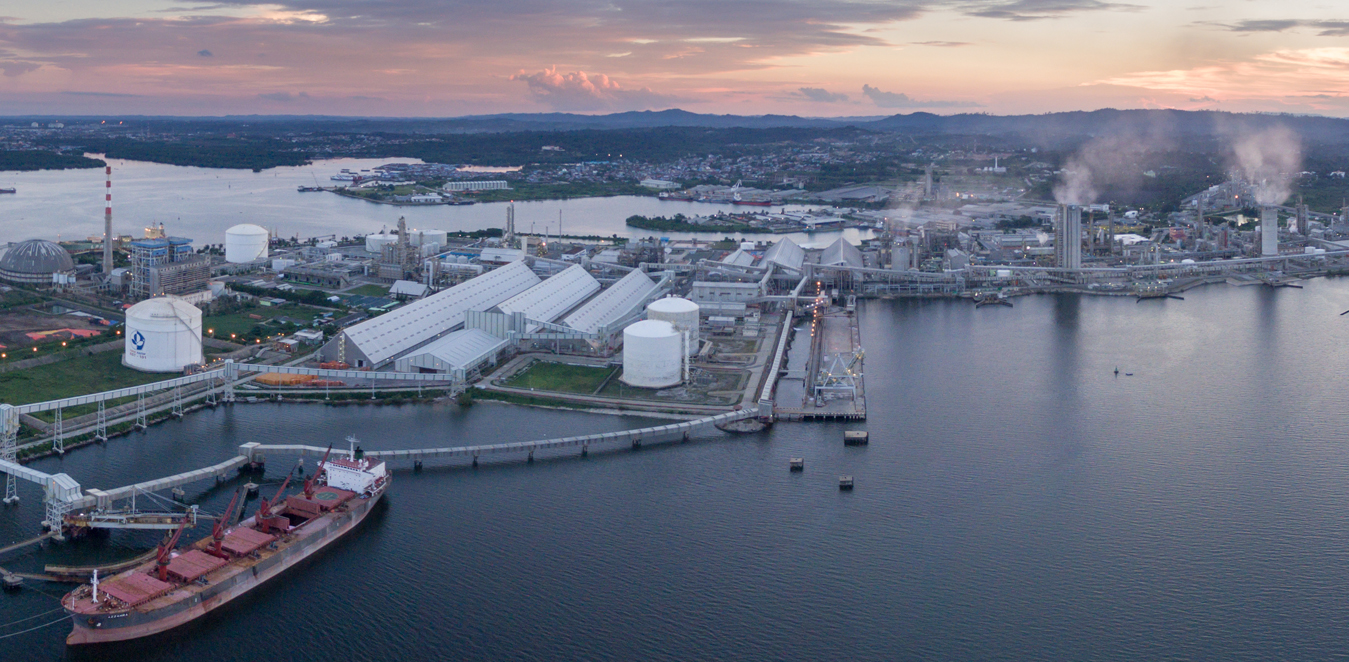
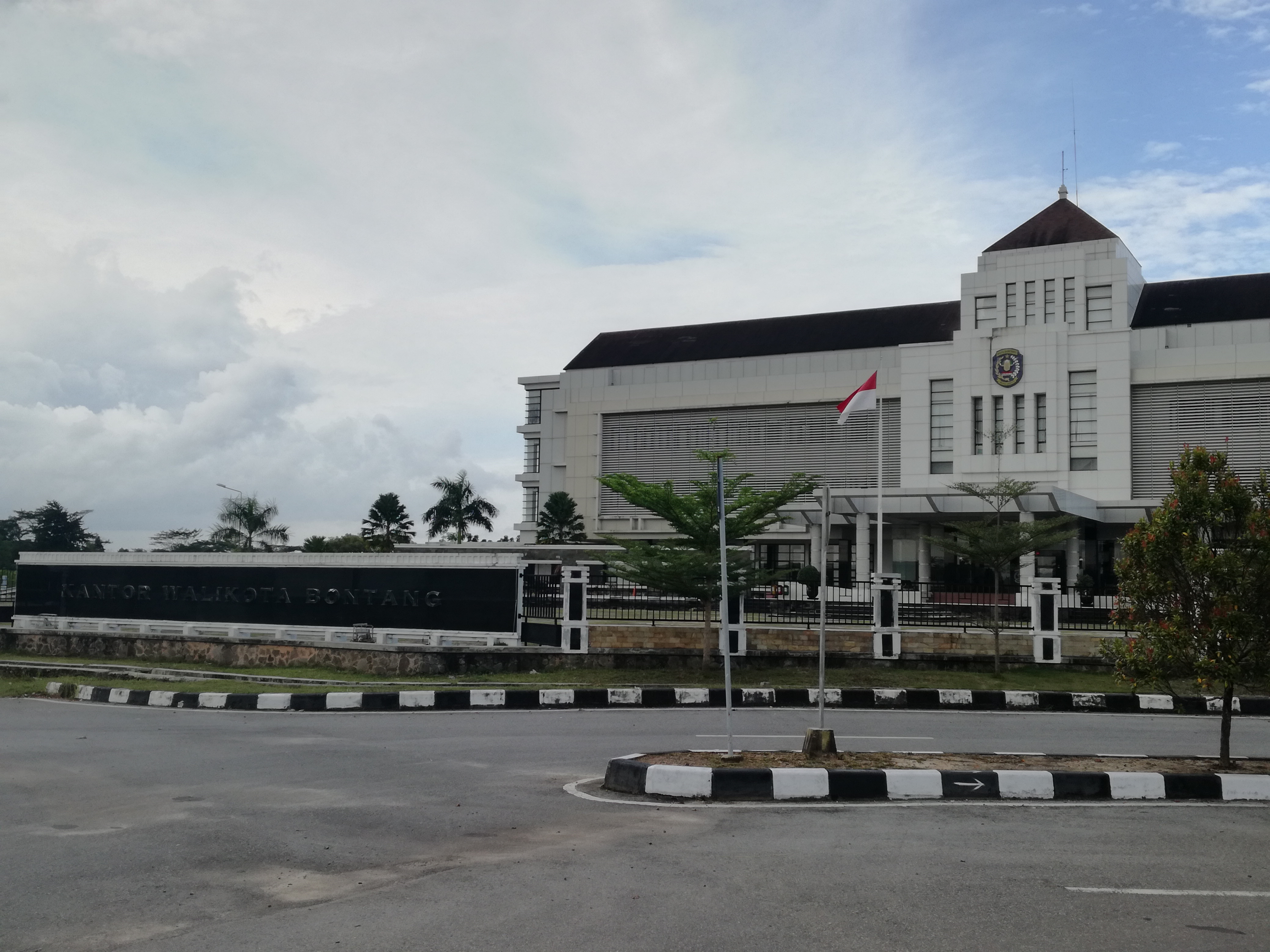
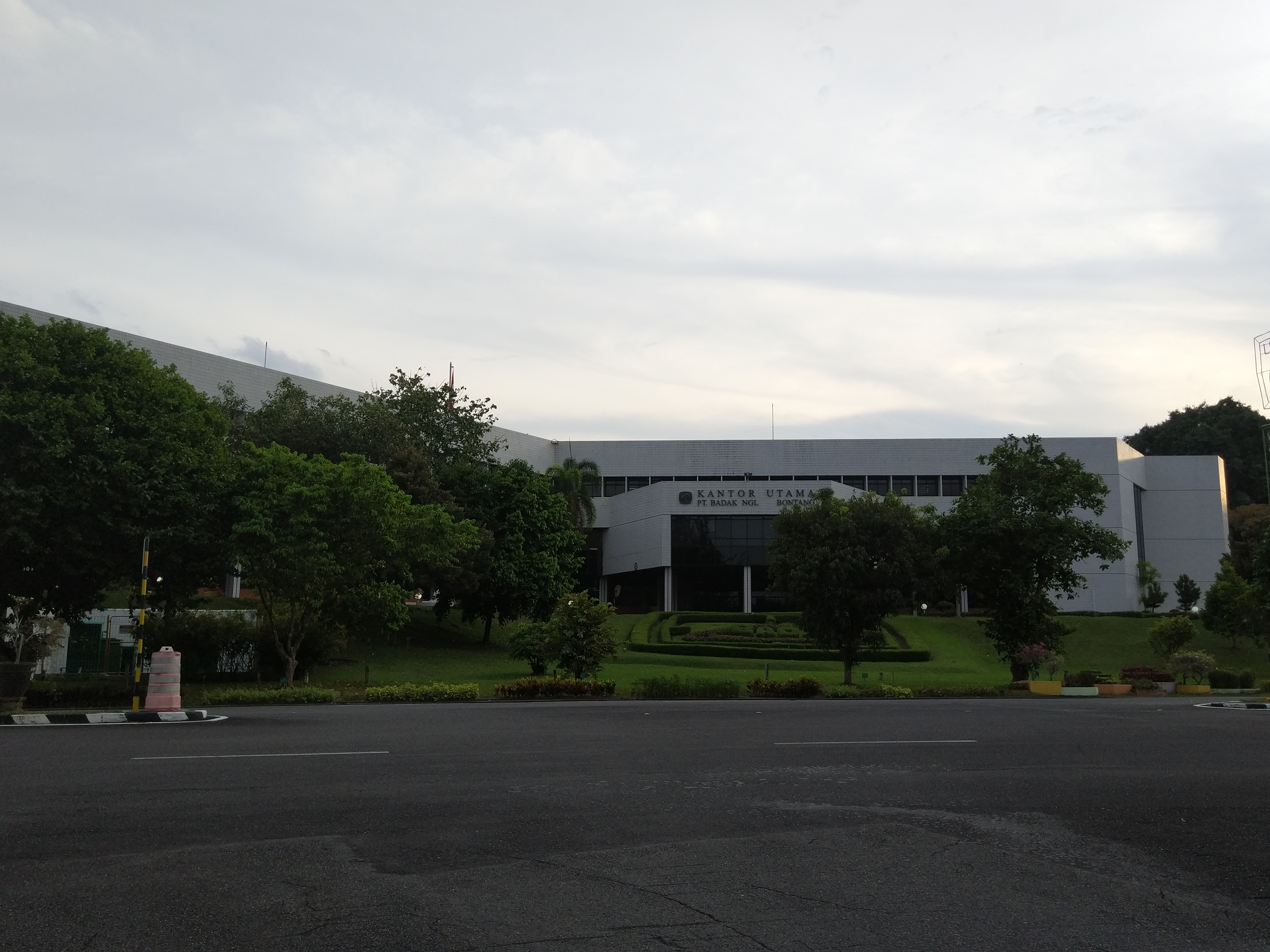
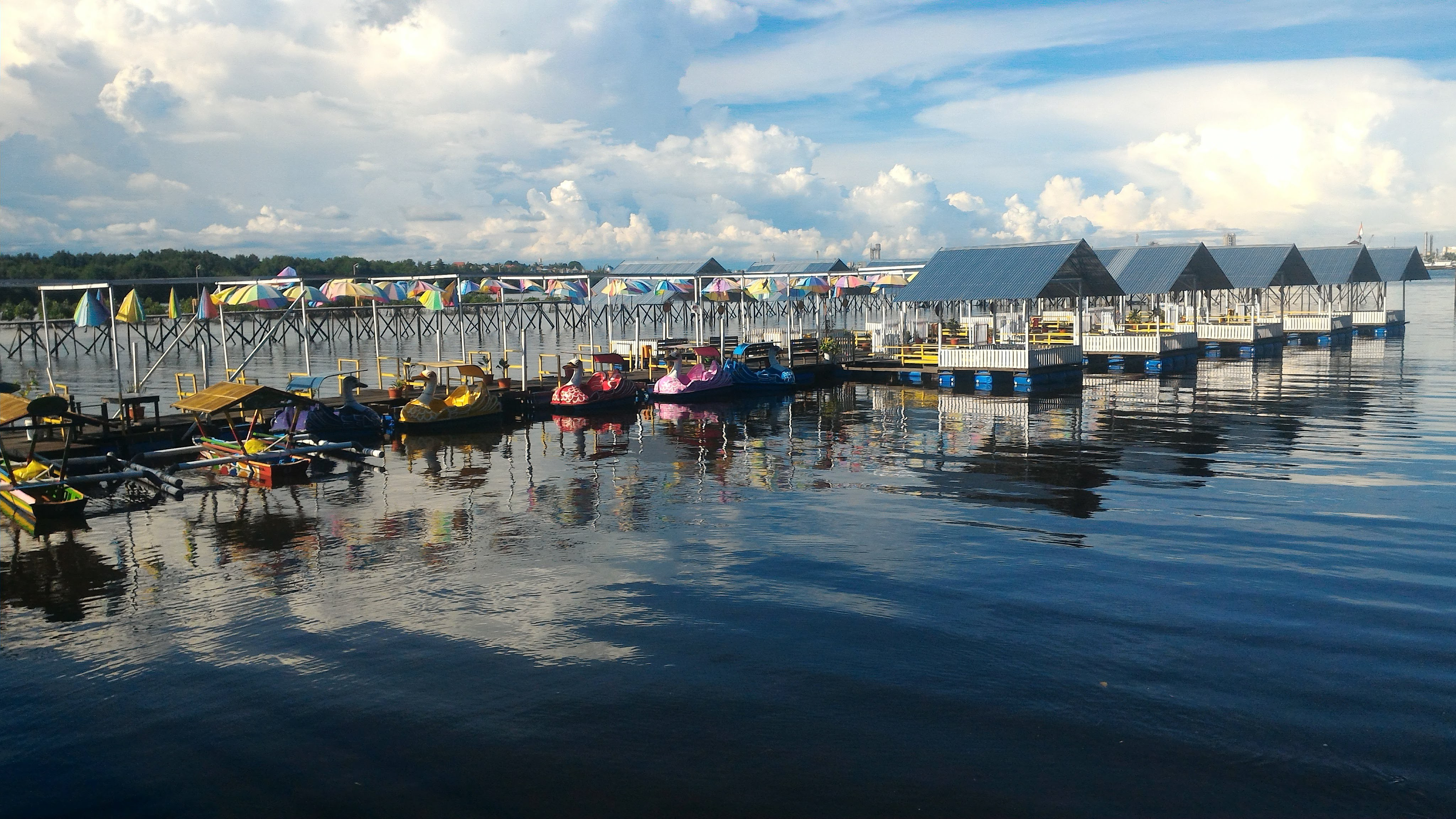
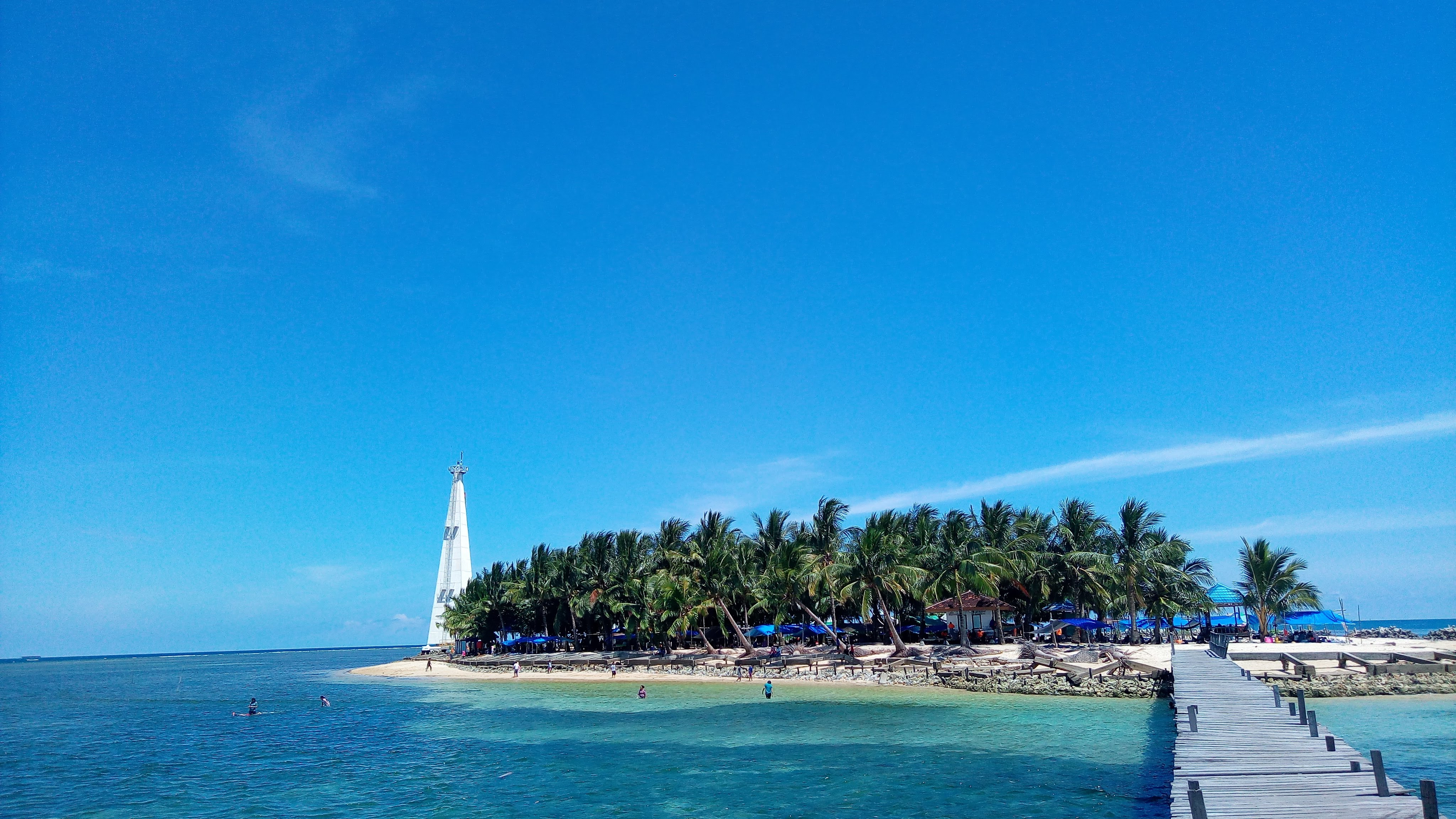
- Clockwise: Pupuk Kalimantan Timur Fertiliser Factory, Badak NGL Headquarters, Beras Basah Island, Graha Mangrove Park, Bontang City Hall.

- Flag Coat of arms
- Nickname: id : Kota Taman (Garden City)
- Motto: Kutai: Bessai Berinta (Rowing Together)
- Interactive map of Bontang
- Location in Kalimantan and Indonesia Bontang (Indonesia)
- Coordinates: 0°08′N 117°30′E
- Country: Indonesia
- Province: East Kalimantan
- Settled: 1826
- Administrative city: 1 December 1989
- City: 12 October 1999

Government
  - Mayor: Neni Moerniaeni
  - Vice Mayor: Agus Haris

Area
  - Total: 160.62 km^{2} (62.02 sq mi)
- Elevation: 20 m (66 ft)

Population (mid 2025 estimate)
  - Total: 194,606
  - Density: 1,211.6/km^{2} (3,138.0/sq mi)
- Time zone: UTC+8 (Indonesia Central Time)
- Postal Code: 7531x, 7532x, 7538x
- Area code: (+62) 548
- HDI (2019): ▲0.801 (Very High)
- Website: bontangkota.go.id

Bontang is a city on the eastern coast of the island of Borneo in Indonesia, and is located in the province of East Kalimantan. It occupies a land area of 160.62 km^{2} (62.02 sq mi), and had a population of 140,787 people at the 2010 census, and 178,917 people at the 2020 census; the official estimate as of mid-2025 was 194,606 people (comprising 100,538 males and 94,068 females). It is also the third most densely populated place in the province after Balikpapan and Samarinda.

== History ==
=== Etymology ===
Bontang refers to the town's traditional status as a humble village populated mostly by immigrants. Alternately, the name of the town means 'a group of visitors' that come from "Bond" meaning a group and "Tang" which means visitor. A coastal town, Bontang was initially a settlement governed under the Kutai Sultanate based in Tenggarong.

=== Colonial era ===
In 1920, the village of Bontang was established as a district headquarters, which was at that time called the Onderdistrict van Bontang. Bontang was still a district under the leadership of a wedana assistant who was a cleric in the government of Sultan Aji Muhammad Parikesit, the 19th Sultan of Kutai Kartanegara (1921-1960).

=== Independence era ===
Since 1954, a district head has taken office. The enactment of Law No. 27 of 1959 concerning the establishment of the Regional Level (Dati) II in East Kalimantan removed the status of self-government. In 1972, the government of the then Kutai Regency recognized Bontang as a district.

Major development of Bontang as an industrial area took place following the establishment of two major companies, PT Badak Natural Gas Liquefaction in 1974, and PT Pupuk Kaltim, a company specializing in the production of ammonia and fertilizer, three years later. Both companies built facilities and infrastructure that were very important for the economic growth of the city.

On 1 December 1989, following the enactment of Government Regulation No. 20 of 1989, the central government upgraded Bontang from a district to an administrative city (kota administratif / kotif) consisting of North Bontang and South Bontang, the largest bulk of the district would become Sangatta (later split into 5 districts, and renamed to North Sangatta). Also, the villages of Santan Ilir, Central Santan, and Santan Ulu were transferred into Muara Badak (and now part of Marang Kayu in Kutai Kartanegara Regency).

In 1999, Bontang became an autonomous independent city (kotamadya). A third district – West Bontang – was created on 16 August 2003 from parts of the other two.

== Geography ==
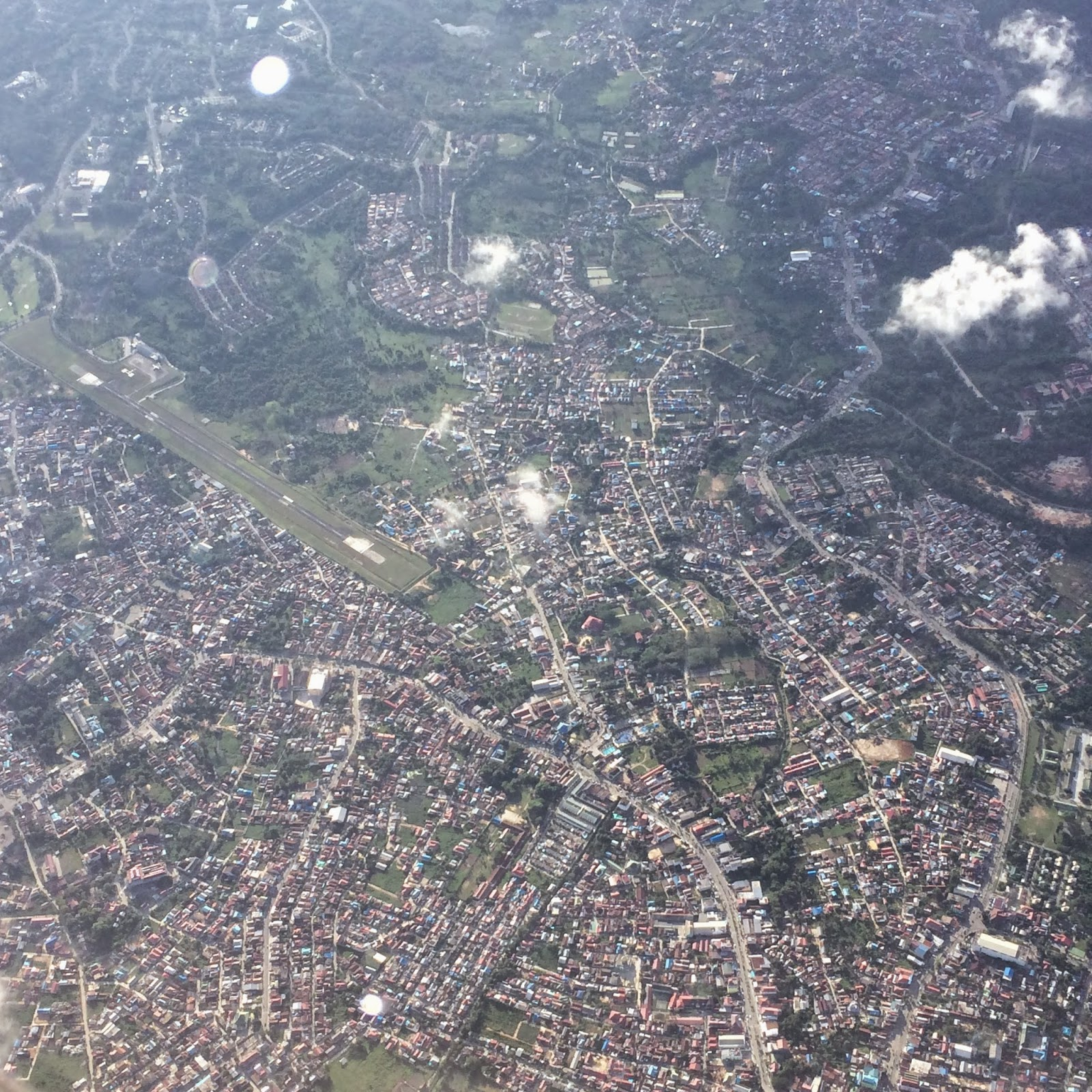
Aerial view of Southern Bontang

Bontang is located between 117° 23′ E and 117° 32′ E and 0° 01′ N and 0° 12′ N. It administers an area of 497.57 km^{2}.

Within this area, only 160.62 km^{2} (62.02 sq mi) or 32% is land. The city is dominated by flat lands ranging from 0 – 106 metres above sea level but also includes several hills. Approximately 48% of the city's land area is located in coastal regions and is characteristically level with a slope of 0 - 2%. It is bordered by Teluk Pandan District (of East Kutai Regency) in the north and west, by the Makassar Strait in the east, and by Marang Kayu District (of Kutai Kartanegara Regency) in the south. Soil deposits in the city largely consist of podzol in the interior and alluvium sediments in the coastal region. This makes the city prone to erosion and the use of land for agriculture or development requires prior soil stabilisation.

The city with its surrounding districts is part of the Kutai river basin, and is dominated by quartz sand and sandstone formations created by sediment from nearby rivers.

== Demographics ==
In 2021, the city population had increased by 1.07% compared with the previous year. The sex ratio as of 2023 was 100 females to 107 males. As with most Indonesian cities, the population is young, with people in the age range 15 – 64 years accounting for around 70%. The most densely occupied district in 2025 is North Bontang (2,840 per square kilometre), and the least dense is South Bontang (648 per square kilometre), although the latter is because South Bontang includes a relatively unpopulated area in its south.

== Economy ==
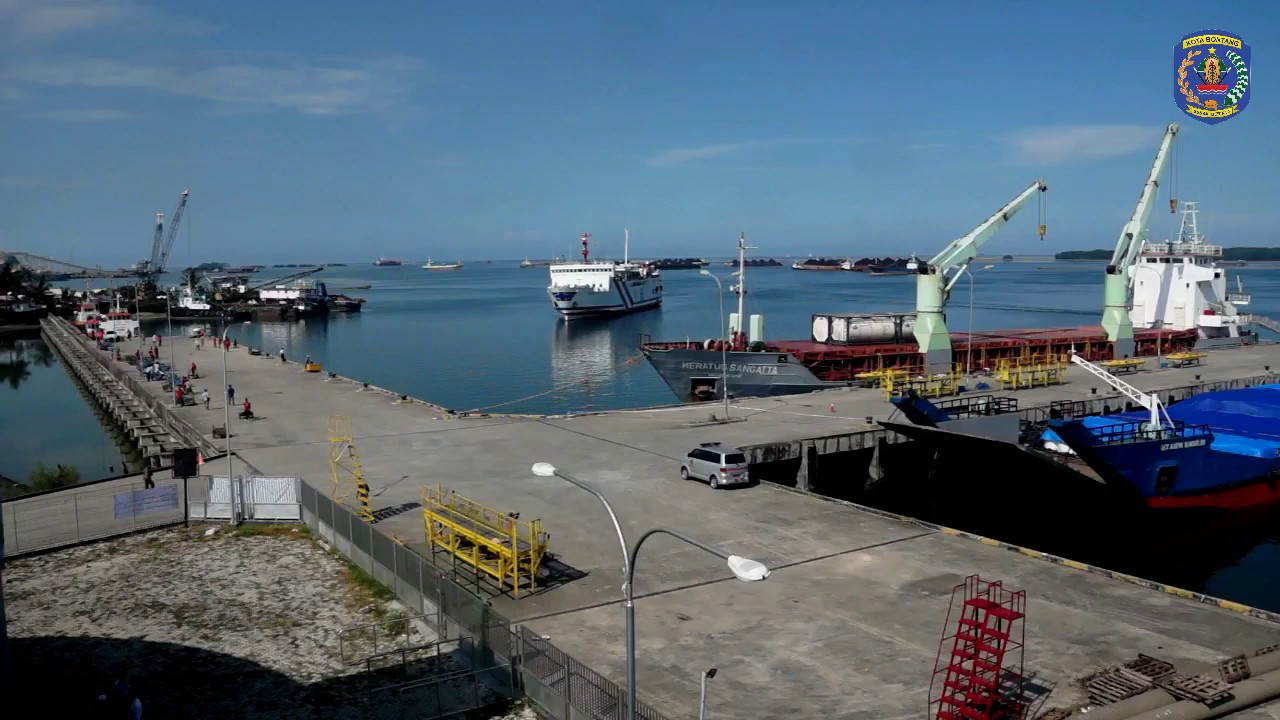
Port in Bontang city

In 2010, Bontang had the highest municipal GDP (nominal) per capita in Indonesia, amounting to Rp375,407,000 (US$38,306) according to Statistics Indonesia. However, there has been a decreasing trend in income and GDP per capita since 2015 due to the decline of coal mining and LNG production caused by negative economic growth.

=== Fishing and agriculture ===
The fishing industry in Bontang is small, consisting mainly of small-scale fish farming for local consumption in Bontang and nearby cities, such as Balikpapan. A small amount of the catch is exported to Makassar and Hong Kong. Only a small proportion of the land in Bontang is available and/or suitable for farming. As a result, only about 4% of Bontang residents are involved in agriculture.

=== Manufacturing ===
PT Pupuk Kaltim was established in 1977. It is an Indonesian government-owned fertilizer company that manufactures ammonia and urea from the area's natural gas. The company operates four units producing ammonia and five units producing urea, resulting in an annual output of 1,850,000 tons of ammonia and 2,980,000 tons of urea. The ammonia production is exported to countries such as South Korea, Taiwan, the Philippines, and India, as well as being used locally in Indonesia whilst urea is distributed to national rice farmers and plantations (rubber, oil palm, etc.). There are also other manufacturing companies in Kaltim Industrial Estate near PT Pupuk Kaltim e.g. PT. Kaltim Parna Industri produces ammonia and PT Kaltim Methanol Industri that produces methanol. As of 2015, the city is the biggest producer of urea and ammonia in South East Asia.

=== Energy and mining ===
PT Badak LNG was established on 26 November 1974 as a joint-venture company with Pertamina, Total S.A., Vico, and Jilco. It currently produces around 22 million tons of liquefied natural gas (LNG) per year, most of which is exported to Japan. PT Indominco, a coal mining company, was established in 1977. It is owned by a Thai company, Banpu, and extracts up to 11 million tons of coal per year. The coal is mainly sold to electricity companies in Japan, Korea, and Taiwan.

== Governance ==
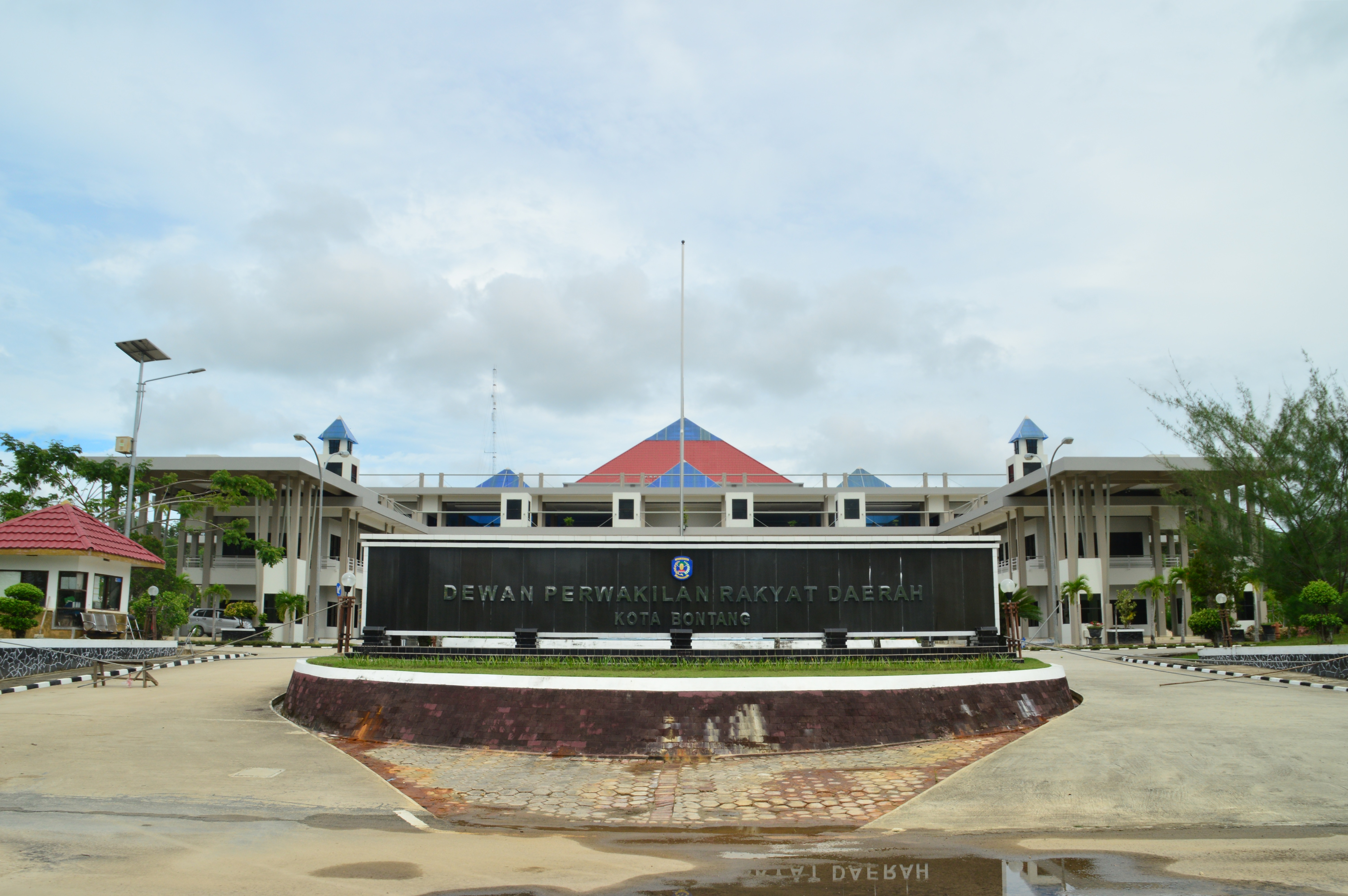
Bontang city parliament building (Bontang People's Representative Council)

=== Local government ===
As with all Indonesian cities, Bontang is a second-level administrative division run by a mayor and vice mayor together with the city parliament, and it is equivalent to a regency. Executive power lies with the mayor and vice mayor, while legislative duties are undertaken by the local parliament. The mayor, vice mayor and parliament members are democratically elected by the people of the city. Heads of districts are appointed directly by the city mayor following recommendations by the city secretary.

=== Politics ===
The city is part of the 6th electoral district at the provincial level, together with Berau Regency and East Kutai Regency, having 12 out of 55 representatives in the provincial parliament of East Kalimantan. At the city level, the city parliament consists of 25 representatives from 3 electoral districts. The last election for representatives was in 2024 and the next one will be in 2029.

Electoral District	Region	Representatives
Bontang 1st	South Bontang District	10
Bontang 2nd	West Bontang District	4
Bontang 3rd	North Bontang District	11
Total		25

=== Administrative divisions ===
Bontang is bordered by Teluk Pandan District of East Kutai Regency to the north and west, by Marang Kayu District of Kutai Kartanegara Regency to the south, and by the Makassar Strait to the East. Bontang is divided into three districts (kecamatan), listed below with their areas and their populations at the 2010 census and the 2020 census, together with the official estimates as of mid 2025. The table also includes the numbers of administrative villages in each district (all classed as urban kelurahan), and its postcodes.

Regional code	District name	Area (km^{2})	Population			Administrative centre	No. of urban villages	Post code(s)
Regional code	District name	Area (km^{2})	2010	2020	2025	Administrative centre	No. of urban villages	Post code(s)
64.74.01	North Bontang (Bontang Utara)	31.86	61,394	82,121	90,472	Bontang Baru	6	75311, 75312, 75314
64.74.02	South Bontang (Bontang Selatan)	110.83	57,442	67,142	71,808	Tanjung Laut	6	75321, 75324, 75325
64.74.03	West Bontang (Bontang Barat)	17.93	24,847	29,654	32,326	Kanaan	3	75313, 75383
	Totals	160.62	143,683	178,917	194,606		15	

== Infrastructure ==
=== Education ===
There are 61 elementary schools, 34 junior high schools, and 27 senior high schools (including vocational) in the city as of 2019. There is no public university in the city. However, the city has four higher education institutions, all of which are private. The most notable of these is Bontang Industrial Technology College (STTIB, short for Sekolah Tinggi Teknologi Industri Bontang). School participation rate as of 2020 was 99%. The only higher education institution with university status in the city is Trunajaya University, which is also private.

=== Health ===
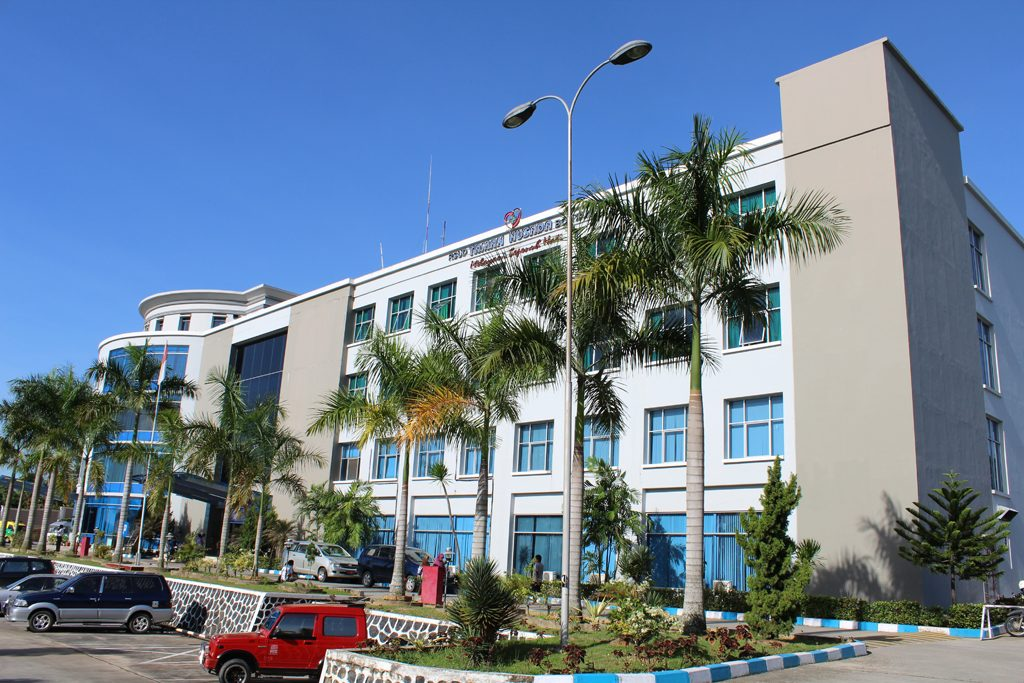
Taman Husada Bontang Regional Hospital

As of 2019, there are five hospitals in the city, 6 puskesmas, 13 clinics, and 119 healthcare centers. One of the hospitals, Taman Husada Bontang Regional Hospital, is a public hospital owned by the city government. It is categorized as a B-class hospital by Ministry of Health. A new public hospital is currently under construction as of August 2020 and is expected to be categorized as D-class.

=== Places of worship ===
There are 218 mosques, 58 churches, one Buddhist temple, and one Hindu temple in the city as of 2026.

== Transportation ==
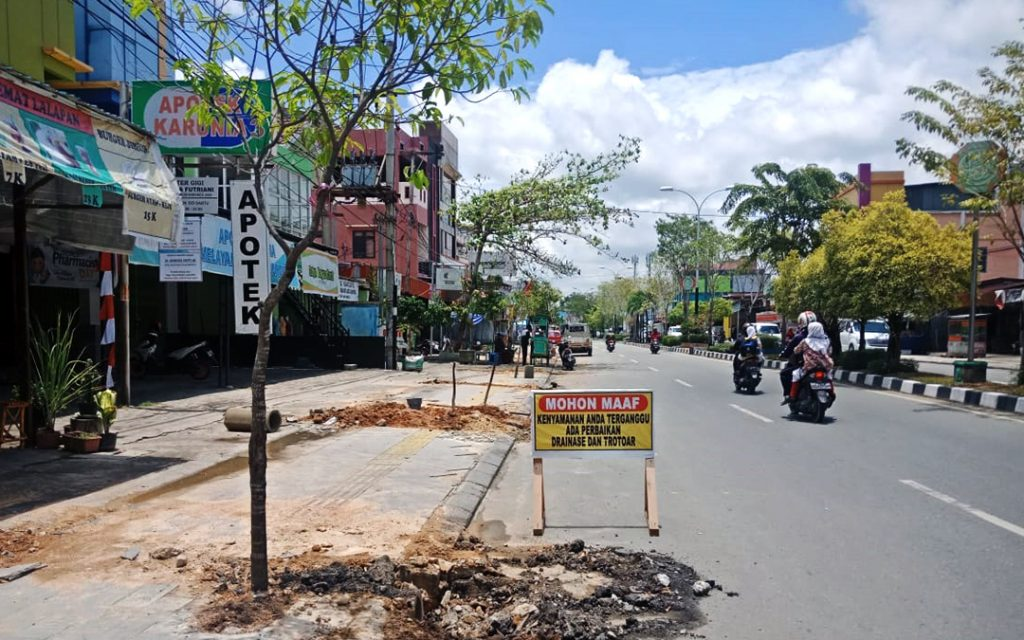
Drainage system construction beside a road in Api-Api, Bontang

Bontang city has 204.4 kilometers of road, of which around 100.05 kilometers have been paved with asphalt. The city also has six public transport terminals used mainly by buses and angkots as of 2020. The only airport in the city is PT Badak Bontang Airport, which is a private airport owned by Badak NGL. The principal seaport serving the city is Loktuan Port, which as of 2020 is undergoing a massive expansion to support the new Indonesian capital in Kalimantan and to relieve traffic from the crowded port of Balikpapan. Online motorcycle and conventional taxis provided by Gojek and Grab have already established a presence in the city. A toll road connecting the city to Samarinda is already planned.

== Climate ==
Bontang has a tropical rainforest climate. As such the temperature is warm and relatively stable throughout the year. Rainfall is frequent and abundant. Two minor seasonal periods can be identified: one drier than the other. The so-called "dry" season lasts approximately from May until September (but average lower precipitations remain above 80 mm per month). The "rainy" season starts around November and ends around May.

Climate data for Bontang, East Kalimantan, Indonesia
Month	Jan	Feb	Mar	Apr	May	Jun	Jul	Aug	Sep	Oct	Nov	Dec	Year
Mean daily maximum °C (°F)	30 (86)	30.2 (86.4)	30.4 (86.7)	30.4 (86.7)	30.6 (87.1)	30 (86)	29.6 (85.3)	30.1 (86.2)	30.2 (86.4)	30.8 (87.4)	30.6 (87.1)	30.3 (86.5)	30.3 (86.5)
Daily mean °C (°F)	26.5 (79.7)	26.6 (79.9)	26.7 (80.1)	26.8 (80.2)	27.2 (81.0)	26.7 (80.1)	26.3 (79.3)	26.7 (80.1)	26.7 (80.1)	27.1 (80.8)	27 (81)	26.7 (80.1)	26.7 (80.2)
Mean daily minimum °C (°F)	23 (73)	23 (73)	23.1 (73.6)	23.3 (73.9)	23.8 (74.8)	23.4 (74.1)	23 (73)	23.3 (73.9)	23.3 (73.9)	23.5 (74.3)	23.4 (74.1)	23.2 (73.8)	23.3 (73.8)
Average precipitation mm (inches)	165 (6.5)	133 (5.2)	217 (8.5)	217 (8.5)	202 (8.0)	149 (5.9)	89 (3.5)	94 (3.7)	134 (5.3)	128 (5.0)	195 (7.7)	187 (7.4)	1,910 (75.2)
Average precipitation days	17	15	16	14	14	13	13	12	11	12	15	17	169
Average relative humidity (%)	84.7	84.5	84.3	85.3	84.8	84.8	84.4	82.7	83.4	83.2	84.6	84.7	84.3
Source 1: Climate-Data.org (temp & precip)
Source 2: Weatherbase (humidity)
