= Badak LNG =

Natural gas company

Coordinates: 0.114727°N 117.465907°E

PT Badak LNG

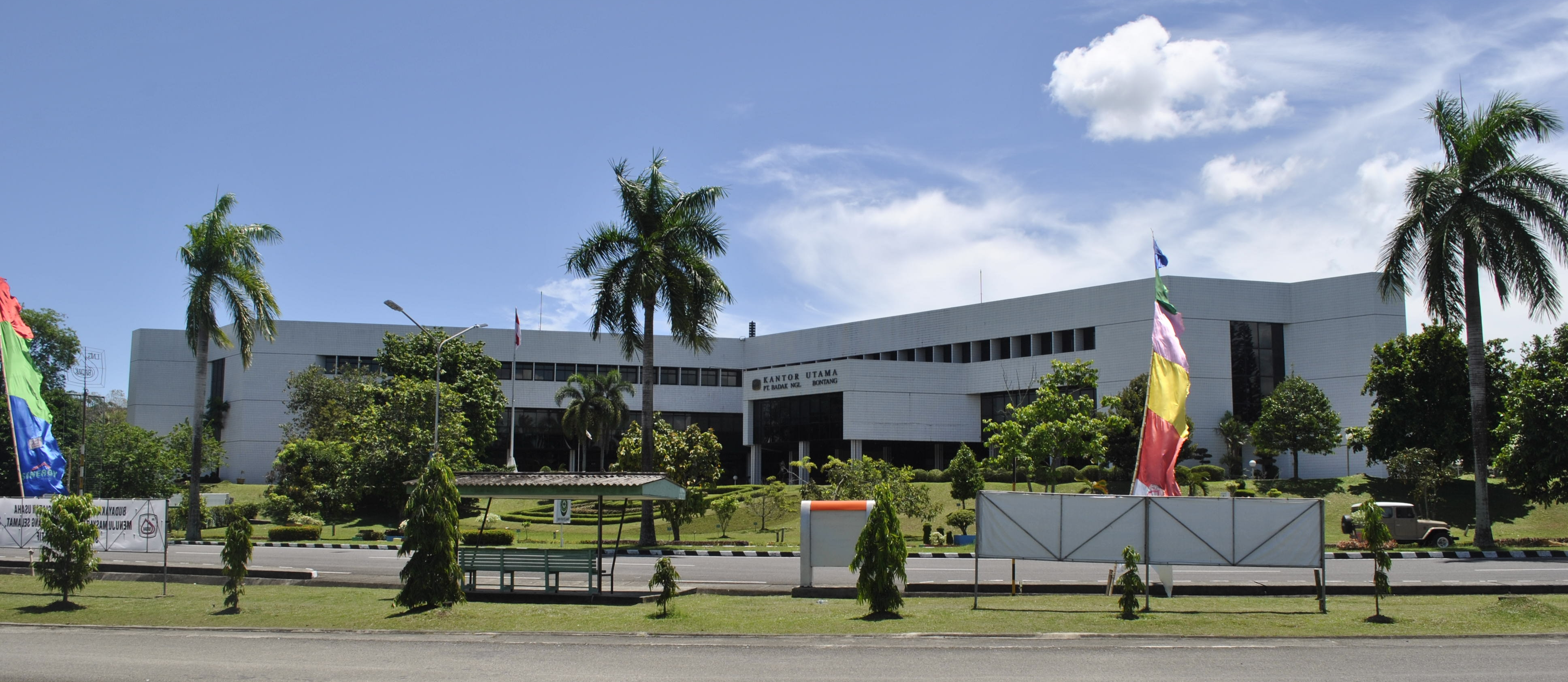
- Headquarters of Badak NGL
- Type: State-owned enterprise
- Industry: Natural Gas refinery
- Founded: November 26, 1974; 51 years ago
- Headquarters: Bontang, Indonesia
- Area served: East Asia and Southeast Asia
- Owner: Pertamina
- Number of employees: 1,800 (2017)
- Parent: Pertamina Hulu Energi
- Website: Badak LNG

Badak
- Country: Indonesia
- Region: South China Sea
- Offshore/onshore: offshore
- Operator: Pertamina

Field history
- Discovery: 1970
- Start of production: 1971

Production
- Estimated gas in place: 200×10^{9} m^{3} 7×10^{12} cu ft

Badak LNG (formerly known as PT Badak Natural Gas Liquefaction or PT Badak NGL) is the largest liquefied natural gas (LNG) company in Indonesia and one of the largest LNG plants in the world. It produces natural gas and condensates derived from the Badak gas field, a natural gas field located in the South China Sea that was discovered in 1970.

The company is located in Bontang, East Kalimantan, and the plant there has eight process trains capable of producing 22.5 million metric tons per annum (mtpa) of LNG. This makes the company one of the major contributors to gross domestic product (GDP) in the petroleum and gas sector for both Bontang and Indonesia, as well as one of the major LNG plants in Indonesia alongside Arun LNG, Donggi Senoro LNG, and Tangguh LNG.

== History ==
=== Discovery and contracting (1972–1974) ===
The Badak LNG project began in February 1972 when Huffco—an oil and gas contracting company at Pertamina now known as Virginia Indonesia Company (VICO)—found a giant natural gas reserve in East Kalimantan. Known as the Muara Badak complex, it included the Samberah, Nilam, and Mutiara fields, and it followed the discovery of similar giant natural gas reserves in the Arun field in Aceh by ExxonMobil.

Although without prior experience in the LNG sector, Pertamina and Huffco agreed to develop the project with the aim of exporting large amounts of LNG. At that time, the LNG business was new and not well known, with only four LNG plants in the world. Even so, Pertamina, Mobil Oil, and Huffco Inc. tried to sell the project to potential LNG consumers, funders, and partners around the world, eventually securing an LNG sales contract on December 5, 1973, with five Japanese companies: Chubu Electric Co., Kansai Electric Power Co., Kyushu Electric Power Co., Nippon Steel Corp., and Osaka Gas Co., Ltd. This was known as "The 1973 Contract".

=== Establishment and development (1974–2000) ===
The company PT Badak NGL was established on November 26, 1974, with its shareholders being Pertamina, VICO Indonesia, and Japan Indonesia LNG Co. Ltd. (JILCO), the three companies that also operate the Badak LNG plant. Construction of the refinery began on November 26, 1974, and the first LNG train (Train A) was completed 36 months later on July 5, 1977. The first refinery was inaugurated on August 1, 1977, and the first shipment of LNG was dispatched on August 9, 1977, going to Senboku, Japan, on the LNG Aquarius.

For 25 years, the Badak LNG plant had only two LNG trains, but it now has eight—the extra trains and LPG-producing facilities were added after the discovery of further large reserves around Muara Badak. Operating at full capacity, the Badak LNG refinery can produce an average of 140,000 tons of natural gas per day. The annual total LNG production increased from 3.3 million tons in 1977 to more than 22 million tons of LNG and 1.2 million tons of liquefied petroleum gas (LPG) per year by 2001, making Badak NGL's LNG production one of the largest in the world. The total proven reserves of the Badak gas field are around 7 trillion cubic feet (200 billion m^{3}), with production originally slated to increase to around 500 million cubic feet/day (1.42 million m^{3}/day).

After initially having only a single 36-inch pipeline, PT Badak NGL now delivers natural gas from the gas fields via four parallel pipelines measuring 36 inches (91.44 cm) or 42 inches (106.68 cm). In addition, a 42-inch pipe owned by Pupuk Kalimantan Timur is on the same pipeline track.

=== Decrease in production (2001–present) ===
LNG production from Bontang began to decline after 2001, from 379 cargoes in 2001 to 341 cargoes in 2005, leading to PT Badak no longer being able to fulfill its sales contracts. In addition, Indonesian government policy reduced LNG exports from Bontang in order to meet the LNG supply needs of several domestic fertilizer factories. In 2006, this reduction in gas supply to PT Badak forced its LPG production to be stopped temporarily, with LPG production not resuming until 2009, with a total production of only 435,518 million tons that year.

LNG production has continued to decline since the peak production of 2001. Despite a rise in 2007 and 2008, 2009 LNG production was only 17,375,053 tons, and since 2011 Badak NGL has operated just four train refineries.

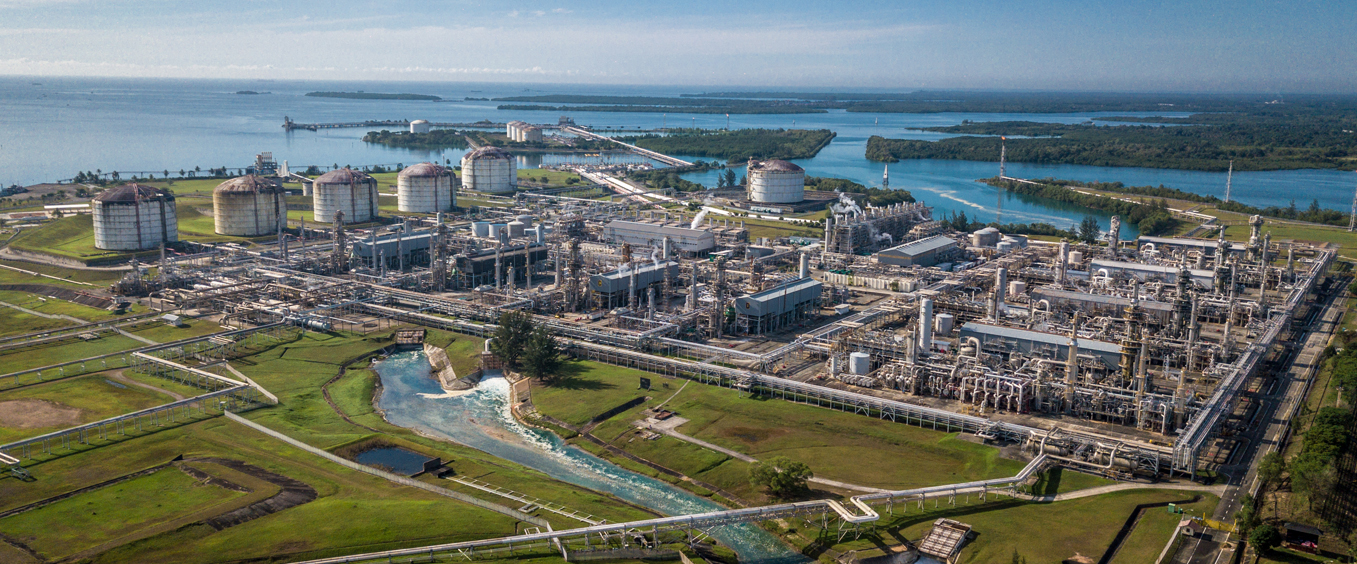
Aerial view of the Badak LNG refinery

=== Company names ===
The company name of PT Badak NGL is taken from the name of the area where the giant natural gas reserves were found, in the district of Muara Badak, Kutai Kartanegara Regency, near the Mahakam River delta. However, PT Badak NGL is also referred to by other names, including "LNG Badak", "PT Badak NGL", "PT Badak NGL Co.", and "Badak LNG", depending on the context.

The term PT Badak NGL is officially registered on the company deed, and in the 1990–2000 period the word Co. was often added, standing for "corporation". This format is always used in legal, official, and contract-related activities. The term LNG Badak is more frequently used during sports events that represent the company, for example, the Bontang LNG Badak Volleyball Team (BLB). Badak LNG is a new format popularized and listed in the new PT Badak NGL corporate identity and considered more appropriate internationally. Other companies operating internationally use this format, so it is often used when establishing contracts or agreements with parties from abroad.

Badak NGL logos

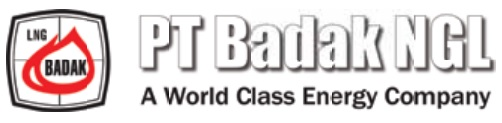
First logo of Badak NGL (1977–2014)

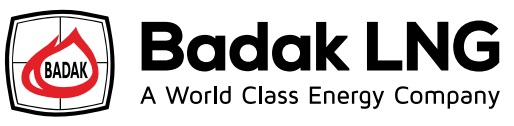
Logo of Badak NGL (2014 to 2018)

Current logo of Badak NGL

== Collaboration with tertiary institutions ==
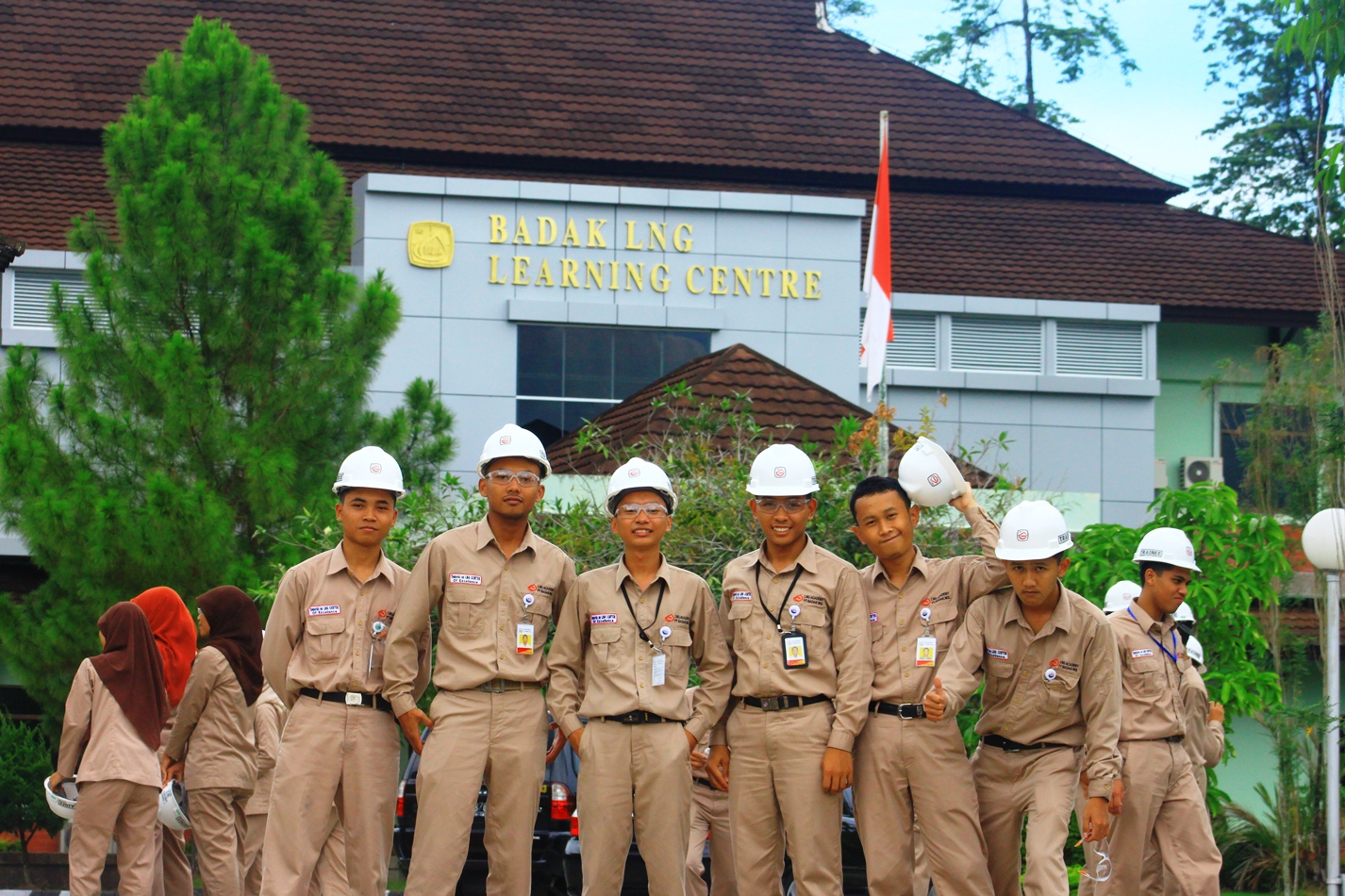
Students of LNG Academy.

In 2011, Badak LNG collaborated with Jakarta State Polytechnic (PNJ) to produce a program called LNG Academy (LNGA). LNGA is part of Badak LNG's overall mission in the education sector aimed at increasing the Human Development Index in Indonesia. The facilities at LNGA are PT Badak NGL training section facilities previously used for training prospective employees, and other company training programs have been converted to support LNGA lecture activities.

Badak LNG also collaborates with other universities and tertiary educational institutions, including the following:

- Brawijaya University for education about enterprise resource planning and research development in digitalization of gas refineries
- Gadjah Mada University for education about natural gas
- Bandung Institute of Technology for master's programs in mechanical engineering and business management
- Samarinda State Polytechnic for middle-class cooperation expertise

== Developing technologies ==
Badak LNG has developed many technologies related to natural gas. Through the Division of Corporate Strategic Planning and Business Development (CSP&BD), the company shares this expertise through training, assistance to field operators, refinery "start-up" assistance, and technical assistance for domestic and international clients. Badak LNG's domestic clients include: Pertamina Gas; Pertamina Gas Niaga; Tangguh LNG; and Donggi-Senoro LNG. International clients include: Angola LNG, Angola; Cameroon LNG, Cameroon; Mozambique LNG, Mozambique; Yemen LNG, Yemen; Mitsui Chemicals, Japan; Chiyoda, Japan; and Dominion Cove Point LNG, Maryland, United States.

== Labor unions ==
There are three labor unions (SPs) in PT Badak NGL—SP-FPLB; SP-LNG; and SP-BLB—as well as the Non-SP union.

SP-FPLB is the dominant SP in PT Badak NGL, having more than 80% of the company's employees as members. It is registered as an SP with the Ministry of Manpower, the official compiler of the Collective Labor Agreement (PKB), together with PT Badak NGL.

SP-LNG is an opposition SP to the SP-FPLB.

SP-BLB is the newest labor union, formed in 2018 and also registered with the Ministry of Manpower.

Non-SP is a group of employees who are not members of any of the other three SPs. Non-SP is also recognized by PT Badak NGL, and there are Non-SP group leaders.
