= South Bontang =

District of Bontang, East Kalimantan

South Bontang Bontang Selatan
- District
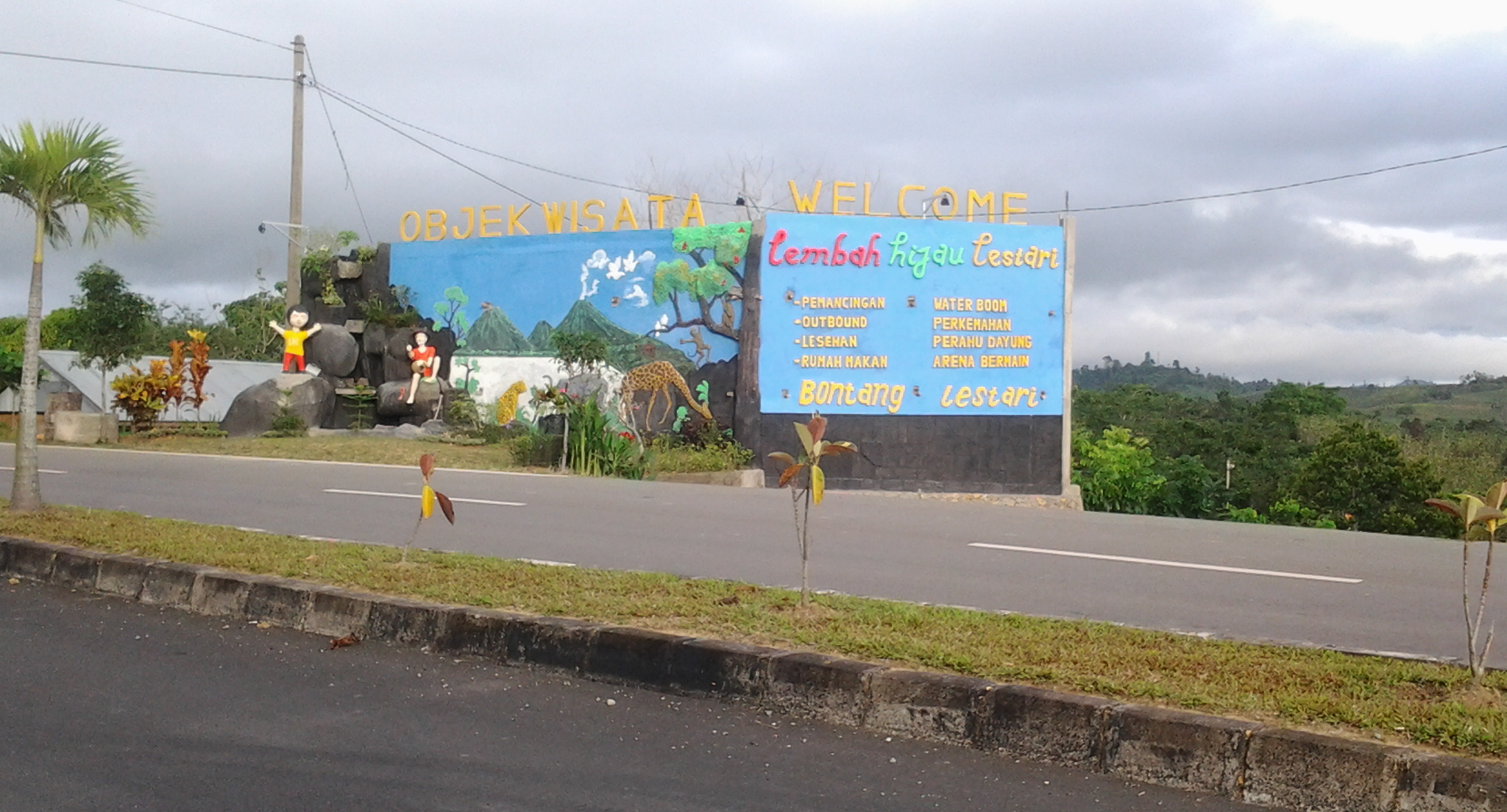
- Lestari Green Valley
- Interactive map of South Bontang
- Location in Kalimantan and Indonesia South Bontang (Indonesia)
- Coordinates: 0°5′8″N 117°25′15″E
- Country: Indonesia
- Province: East Kalimantan
- City: Bontang
- Established: 1 December 1989

Government
  - District head (Camat): Kamsal

Area
  - Total: 110.91 km^{2} (42.82 sq mi)

Population (mid 2025)
  - Total: 71,808
  - Density: 647.44/km^{2} (1,676.9/sq mi)
- Time zone: UTC+8 (ICT)
- Regional code: 64.74.02
- Villages: 6

South Bontang (Indonesian: Bontang Selatan, Indonesian pronunciation: [ˈbɔntaŋ səˈlatan]) is a district of the city of Bontang, in East Kalimantan Province of Indonesia. It covers a land area of 110.91 km^{2} and, as at mid 2024, it was inhabited by 71,808 people. Its district centre is located in the village of Tanjung Laut.

The district was separated on 1 December 1989 from the former district of Bontang. South Bontang shares borders with West Bontang and North Bontang city districts to the north, with Teluk Pandan District (of East Kutai Regency) to the west, and with Marang Kayu District (of Kutai Kartanegara Regency) to the south.

== Governance ==
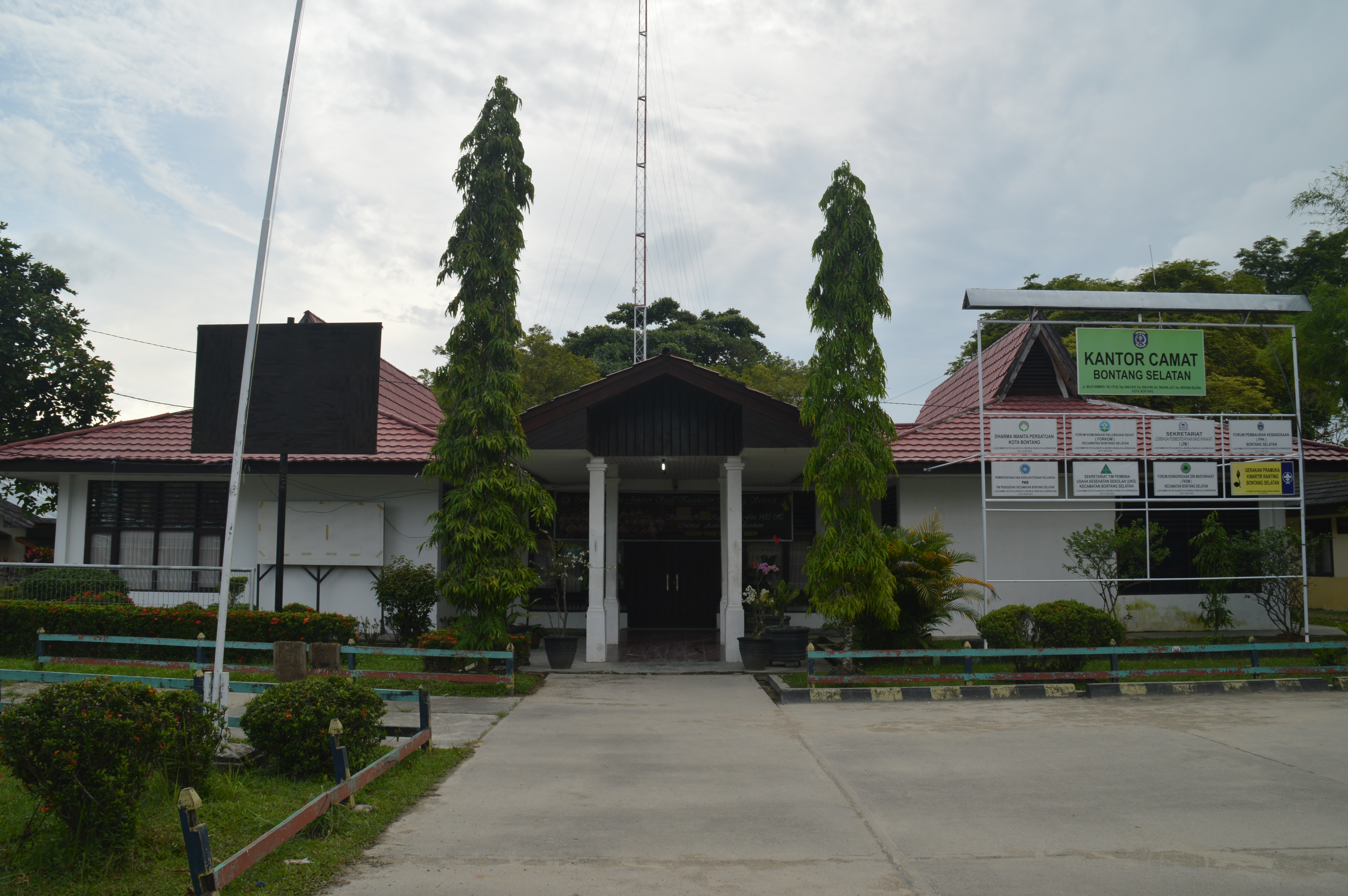
District head office at Tanjung Laut, South Bontang.

=== Villages ===
South Bontang is divided into the following six urban villages (kelurahan), and the district seat is marked bold:

Regional code (Kode wilayah)	Name	Area (km^{2})	Pop'n (2024)	RT (rukun tetangga)
64.74.02.1005	Bontang Lestari	87.82	7,557	19
64.74.02.1004	Satimpo	17.71	6,823	25
64.74.02.1003	Berbas Pantai	0.57	9,850	24
64.74.02.1002	Central Berbas (Berbas Tengah)	0.85	14,400	62
64.74.02.1001	**Tanjung Laut**	1.43	16,895	38
64.74.02.1006	Tanjung Laut Indah	2.52	15,642	33
	Totals	110.91	71,167	201

Bontang Lestari kelurahan in the south of the district covers a wide and largely rural area, whereas the other five kelurahan comprise part of the urban area of the city.
