= Semboku =

Semboku may refer to several places in Japan:

- the city Semboku, Akita (Semboku-shi)
- Semboku District, Akita (Semboku-gun), several districts
- Semboku, Akita (town) (Semboku-machi), former town

== See also ==
- Semboku Rapid Railway, a defunct railway company in Osaka
