= Pupuk Kalimantan Timur =

Indonesian fertilizer company

Coordinates: 0.186304°N 117.47878°E

PT Pupuk Kalimantan Timur

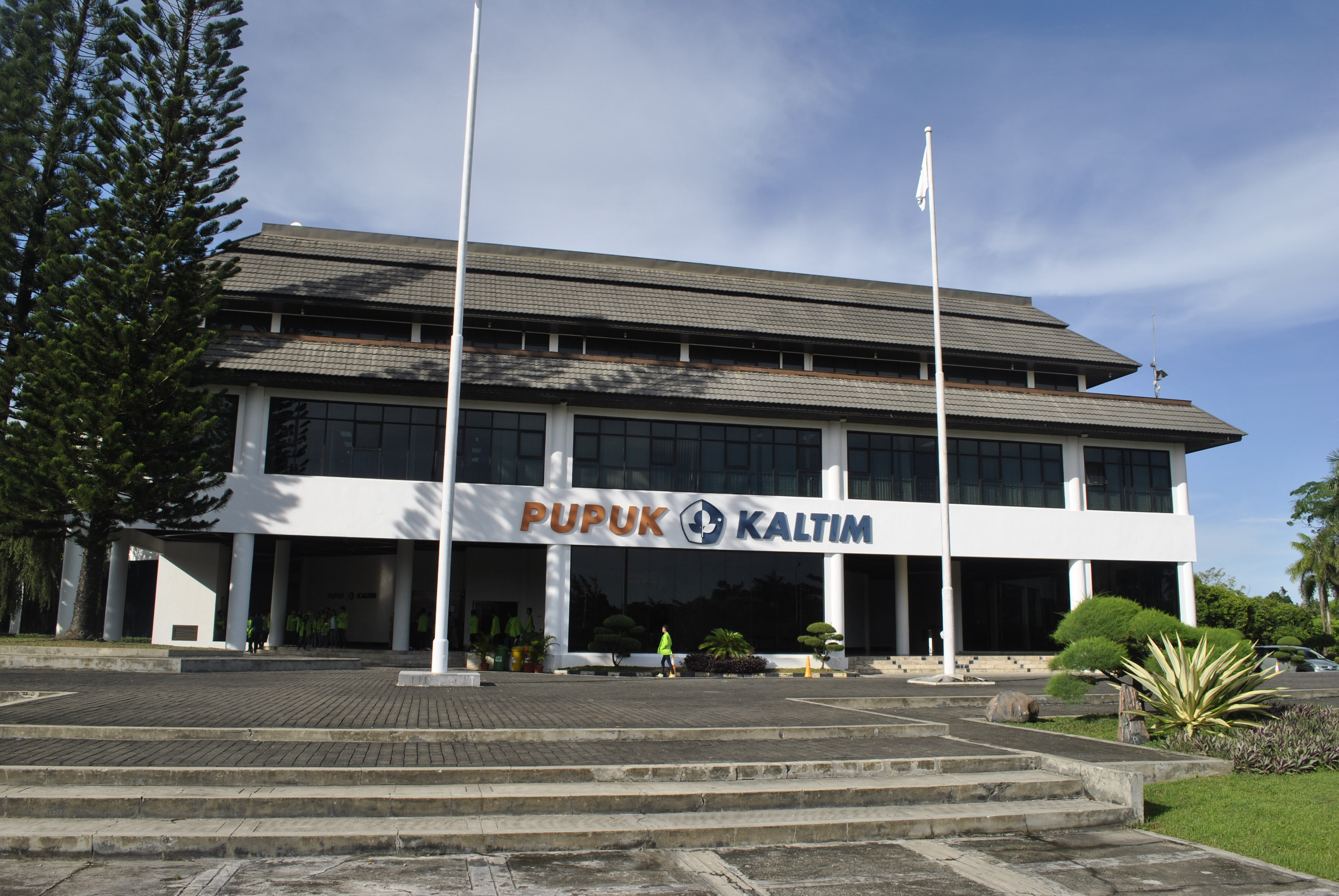
- Headquarters of Pupuk Kaltim
- Company type: State-owned enterprise
- Industry: Fertilizer
- Founded: 7 December 1977; 48 years ago
- Headquarters: Bontang, Indonesia
- Area served: Southeast Asia; South Asia
- Brands: NPK Pelangi; Urea Daun Buah; Urea Mandau; Amoniak; Zeorganik Pupuk Kaltim
- Revenue: ▲ Rp 16.230 trillion (2016)
- Net income: ▲ Rp 1.542 trillion (2016)
- Total assets: ▲ Rp 42.968 trillion (2016)
- Number of employees: 2,237 (2016)
- Parent: PT Pupuk Indonesia
- Website: pupukkaltim.com

PT Pupuk Kalimantan Timur (also called Pupuk Kaltim or PKT) is one of the strategic industrial companies in Indonesia with five Ammonia plant units and five Urea plant units in one location in Bontang, East Kalimantan and is the subsidiary of PT Pupuk Indonesia Holding Company. While the NPK factory units are spread in three cities (Bontang, Semarang, and Surabaya), including the production of organic fertilizer (called zeorganic) which is spread in five regions (Demak, Banyuwangi, Parepare, Badung, and East Lombok). Assets in 2016 reached Rp29,390 trillion.

== History ==
=== Establishment and early history ===
In 1977, an offshore fertilizer project was started on two ships owned by Pertamina, the largest Indonesian oil producer, which later became the beginning of the establishment of PT Pupuk Kalimantan Timur. The success of the project finally began the establishment of a factory covering an area of 493 ha (hectares) which was once a very dense forest area on the hillsides of the forests of East Kalimantan. Precisely on December 7, 1977, PKT was officially established. The main raw material for the plant in Bontang is natural gas which is piped from Muara Badak, about 60 km from the factory location.

Initially the Pupuk Kaltim project was managed by Pertamina with floating fertilizer factory facilities or a factory on board. Because of some technical considerations according to Presidential Decree No.43 of 1975 the project location was transferred to land, and through Presidential Decree 39 of 1976 the management was handed over from Pertamina to the Ministry of Industry.

In 1979 the construction of the Kaltim-1 plant began and the commercial operation period was first started in 1987. The Kaltim-2 plant was built in early 1982 and completed 3 months ahead of the stipulated schedule and succeeded in achieving commercial operations faster than East Kalimantan. -1, namely in 1984. The Kaltim-1 plant and Kaltim-2 factory were inaugurated by President Soeharto on October 28, 1984.

The Kaltim-3 plant was built in 1986 and was inaugurated on April 4, 1989. In addition, a unit for making urea formaldehyde (UFC-85) with a capacity of 13,000 tons per year was built to improve the quality of urea fertilizer produced.

=== Development since 1990 ===
On November 20, 1996, an IV urea unit (POPKA) was built which aims to increase added value for residual Ammonia (Ammonia excess) and CO_{2} gas which is wasted into the atmosphere to produce granular urea products. The factory with a projected production capacity of 570,000 tons per year was completed on April 12, 1999. The investment value for the construction of the POPKA factory was US$44 million and Rp 139 billion.

The Kaltim 4 factory was built in 1999 with a projected capacity of 570,000 tons of urea granule and 330,000 tons of ammonia per year. Construction of the urea plant was completed in mid-2002, while the ammonia plant was completed in early 2003. In 2007, Pupuk Kaltim made the NPK factory fuse blending in Bontang to produce NPK with phosphates imported from Morocco.

The Kaltim 5 plant, which is planned to have a capacity of 1.2 million tons of urea per year, will soon be realized by the Kaltim-5 Factory PKT which will replace the existence of the Kaltim-1 factory unit which is likely to be closed because it is old and inefficient. To support Kaltim-5 operations, Pupuk Kaltim will also build an ammonia plant with a capacity of around 600,000 tons per year.

At present Pupuk Kaltim has five Urea fertilizer plants with a total capacity of 2.98 million tons of urea per year and four Ammonia plants with a total capacity of 1.85 million tons of Ammonia per year. While NPK fertilizer production is as much as 350,000 tons per year with factories in three cities, namely: Bontang, Semarang and Surabaya.

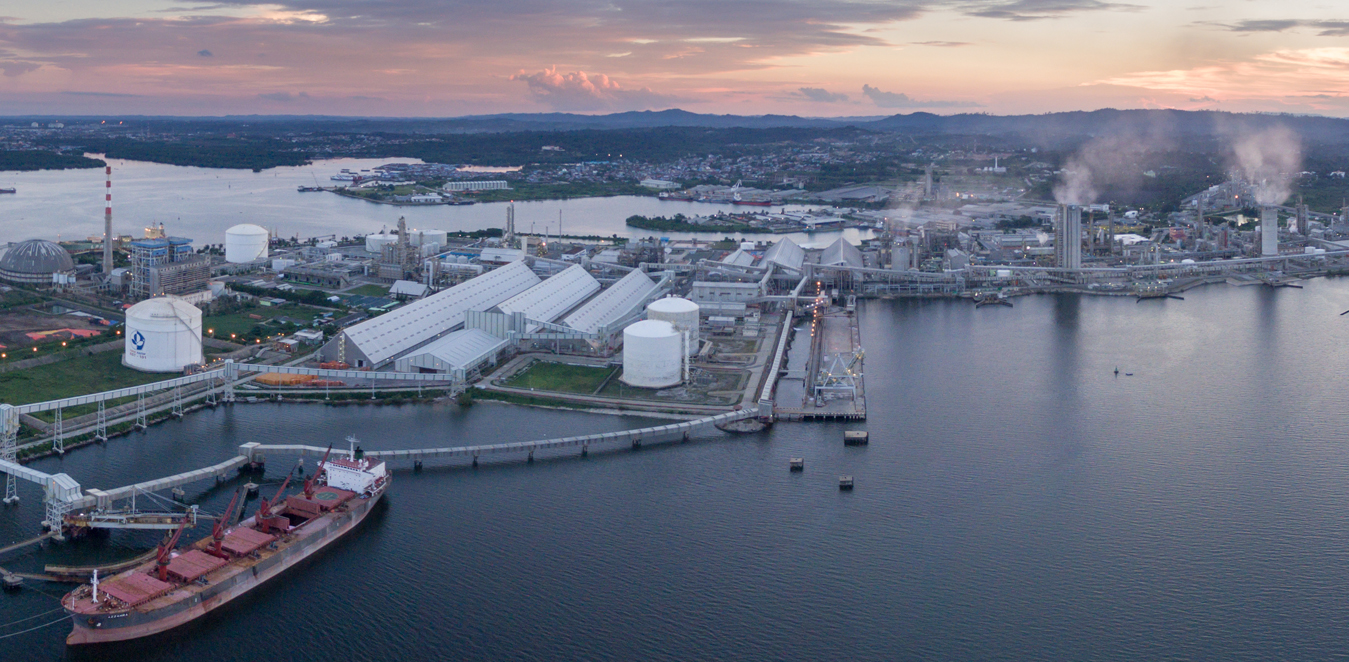
Aerial of Pupuk Kaltim Complex

Pupuk Kaltim currently owns a local TV station based in Bontang, Publik Khatulistiwa TV.

== Products ==
The products produced by Pupuk Kaltim are as follows:

- Urea

A compound that is soluble in water, CO (NH3) 2, with most of it is nitrogen content which is the main component of urine of mammals and other organisms such as fungi, as the end result of protein metabolism. Urea fertilizer is produced and prepared in bulk and granules.

- Ammonia

A chemical compound formed from two gases, nitrogen and hydrogen with NH3 chemical formula. Ammonia is used as a raw material in urea production.

- NPK Pelangi:

NPK Pelangi is a new product intended to improve the welfare of farmers. This fertilizer has advantages such as increasing yield of more than 40%, easily stocked and directly seeped, the stem is stronger and resistant to fall, suitable for all types of plants, the soil becomes more fertile, nutrient available complete and balanced, made of quality materials, and safe for environment. NPK Pelangi is divided into 4, including: NPK Pelangi MAXI, NPK Pelangi UNGGUL, NPK Pelangi PRIMA, and NPK Pelangi SUPER.

- Zeorganik:

Organic fertilizers from Pupuk Kaltim contain components of C-organic ingredients that function to increase soil fertility, also contain non-organic minerals that function to increase Cation Exchange Capacity (kTk) of land, so as to increase the efficiency of non-organic fertilizer use while reducing the rate of evaporation of water from the soil.

== Units of Production ==
=== Units ===
- Kaltim 1

Production capacity: ammonia: 595,000 tons / year, urea: 700,000 tons / year

- Kaltim 2

Production capacity: ammonia: 595,000 tons / year, urea: 570,000 tons / year

- Kaltim 3

Production capacity: ammonia: 330,000 tons / year, urea: 570,000 tons / year

- Kaltim 4

Production capacity: ammonia: 330,000 tons / year, urea: 570,000 tons / year

- Kaltim 1A (POPKA and ex KPA)

Production Capacity: ammonia: 660,000 tons / year, urea: 570,000 tons / year

- Kaltim 5 (under project)

Production Capacity: ammonia: 850,000 tons / year, urea: 1,150,000 tons / year

- NPK

Production capacity: 350,000 tons / year

- Organic fertilizer

=== Total production ===
Ammonia: 2,510,000 tons / year

Urea: 2,980,000 tons / year

NPK: 350,000 tons / year

== Accreditations, Awards and Certifications ==
=== Awards ===
Some of the national awards Pupuk Kaltim received in 1999 were:

- 1994 - Highest Ammonia Production MW Kellog Process License in the World for the Kaltim-2 ammonia factory from MW Kellog Company.
- 1995 - Top Score on Stream Day for the production of the Kaltim-3 ammonia factory, from Haldor Topsoe.
- 1996 - The Highest Safety Sword of Honor for Occupational Health and Safety from the British Safety Council.
- 1997 - National Sports Award from the Vice President of the Republic of Indonesia, for the success in sports coaching on Sports Day on September 9, 1997.
- 1997 - Primaniyarta Award from the President of the Republic of Indonesia for the company's success in export realization, on September 25, 1997.
- 1999 - Satyalancana Pembangunan (Award of Loyalty Symbol for Development) from the President of the Republic of Indonesia, on August 17, 1999
- 1999 - Award from the Governor of East Kalimantan for the success in realizing the Out-of-School Education Program, on July 22, 1999.
- 1999 - Award from the Minister of Tourism, Arts and Culture for the success in fostering traditional batik weaving on 31 July 1999
- 1999 - Award from the President of the Republic of Indonesia for the success of coaching in the field of Community Education on International Literacy Day, 2 September 1999.
- 2002 - The Best BUMN on Community Development Program Award for the community development program from BUMN Review.
- 2002 - Yasa Ayodhya Adinugraha as a PMDN company with high achievement by the Investment Coordinating Board.
- 2004 - Gold Flag for Occupational Health and Safety Management System during 2003 for large industrial classes from the Ministry of Manpower received on 12 January 2004.

=== Accreditations ===
Pupuk Kaltim has also received several international awards as follows:

- The National Testing Association Authority (NATA) of Australia, which was awarded to the Center for Factory Equipment Industry owned by Pupuk Kaltim. The award proves that Pupuk Kaltim has been able to meet the growing needs of spare parts in national and international industries, especially in items related to heat exchangers, pressure valves, and other important components.
- Honorary Sword from the British Government, for the field of work safety.

=== ISO Certificates ===
In addition, the accreditation obtained by Pupuk Kaltim is as follows:

- ISO 9002

Achieved in 1996 for recognition in Production and Installation Management

- ISO 14001

It was won in 1997 for recognition in Quality Environmental Management

- ISO 17025

Achieved in 2000, in the field of Quality Test Laboratories, for the Calibration Laboratory was achieved in 2008.
