= Municipal annexation =

Legal process

Municipal annexation is the legal process by which a city or other municipality acquires land as its jurisdictional territory (as opposed to simply owning the land the way individuals do). The annexed land is typically not part of any other municipality. In the United States and Canada, however, annexation may also involve one polity absorbing another, usually an adjacent and smaller one, and usually by vote of the residents of both polities. For example, in 1872, the city Zanesville, Ohio annexed the adjacent community of Putnam, and in 1889, the city of Toronto annexed the adjacent town of Parkdale.

== Overview ==
Within areas that are subdivided noncontiguously, annexation can take place whereby a lower-tier municipality can annex territory under the jurisdiction of a higher-tier municipality, or tiers do not exist a local municipality can annex territory from another local municipality. The rules that govern municipal annexations in absorption of neighbouring territory vary by country. For example, in the United States, incorporated cities and towns often expand their boundaries by annexing unincorporated land adjacent to them. Municipalities can also entirely annex and be entirely annexed by other municipalities, though this is less common in the United States. Laws governing the ability and the extent municipalities can expand in this fashion are defined by the individual states' constitutions.

Annexation of neighbouring communities occurs in Canada. The City of Calgary, for example, has in the past annexed the communities of Bridgeland, Riverside, Sunnyside, Hillhurst, Hunter, Hubalta, Ogden, Forest Lawn, Midnapore, Shepard, Montgomery, and Bowness. Another example of an annexation in Canada occurred when the city of London, Ontario annexed Wortley Village in 1890.

=== Indonesia ===
In Indonesia, municipal annexations are relatively rare in present times, but these examples did exist in the second half of 20th century.

In West Sumatra, on 21 March 1980, Padang annexed parts of the districts of Koto Tangah, Pauh, and Lubuk Begalung from Padang Pariaman Regency. Soon, Kasang was removed from Koto Tangah (and remains part of Padang Pariaman), while new districts were also created: Nanggalo (from Koto Tangah), Kuranji (from Pauh), Lubuk Kilangan, and Bungus Teluk Kabung (from Lubuk Begalung)

In East Kalimantan, on 24 April 1969, Samarinda received the districts of Palaran, Sanga-Sanga, Muara Jawa, and Samboja from Kutai Regency, while Balikpapan received the districts of Penajam and "parts of Samboja south of the Rawa III river". However, 16 years later, on 13 October 1987, Samarinda returned all of the aforementioned districts (except Palaran) to Kutai, and Pasir Regency annexed Penajam from Balikpapan. In exchange, Samarinda annexed several villages from Loa Janan, Anggana, and Sanga-Sanga.

== See also ==
- Merger (politics)
- Municipal annexation in the United States
