= Balikpapan–Samarinda Toll Road =

Toll road in East Kalimantan

Balikpapan-Samarinda Toll Road
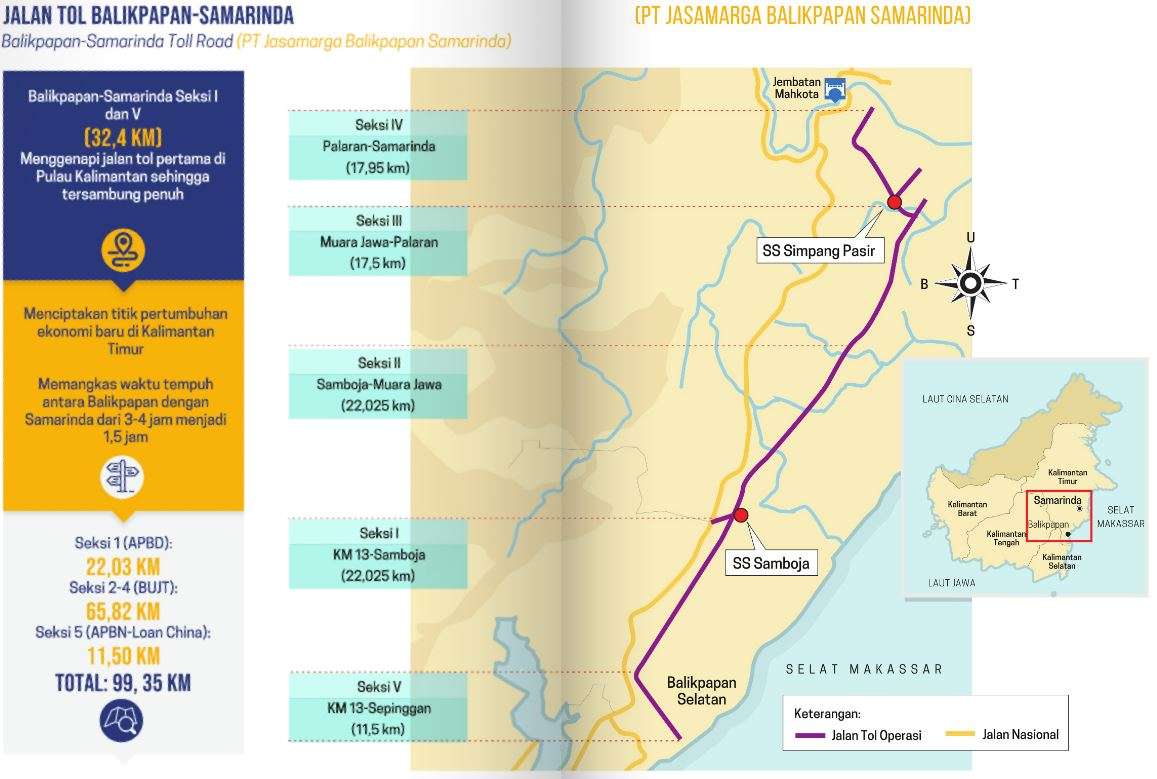

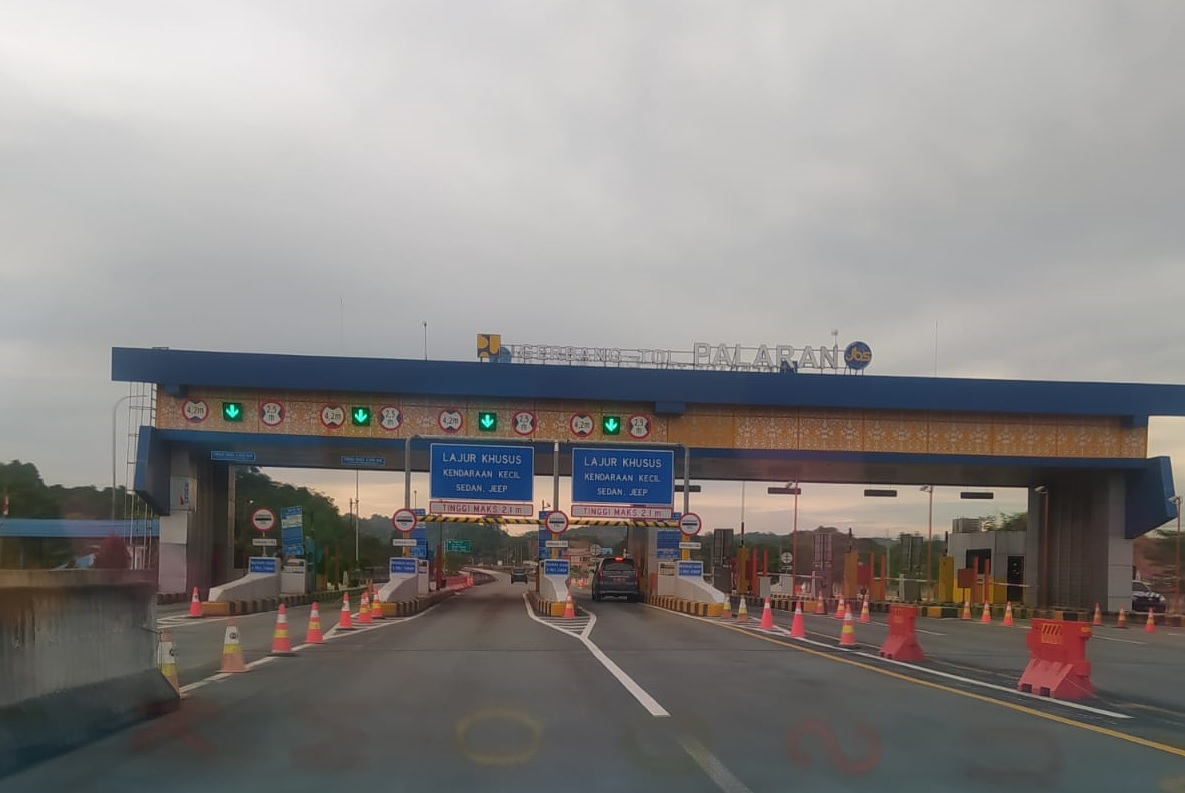
- Balikpapan–Samarinda Toll Road at Palaran Toll Gate

Route information
- Maintained by PT Jasa Marga Balikpapan Samarinda (JBS)
- Length: 99.35 km (61.73 mi)
- Existed: 2019–present

Major junctions
- Southeast end: Manggar
- Northwest end: Samarinda

Location
- Country: Indonesia
- Provinces: East Kalimantan
- Major cities: Balikpapan, Kutai Kartanegara Regency, Samarinda

Highway system
- Transport in Indonesia

Balikpapan–Samarinda Toll Road or Balsam Toll Road is a controlled-access toll road which is constructed to connect Balikpapan with Samarinda of East Kalimantan, Indonesia as well as the proposed new capital city of the country.

== History ==
This is the first expressway in Kalimantan (Indonesian portion), second in the entire Borneo island after Tun Salahuddin Toll Bridge, Sarawak, Malaysia was completed in 2003. The toll road is 99.3 kilometers (325,787 ft) long. Samboja-Samarinda section (58.7 kilometers (192,585 ft)) of the toll road has been inaugurated by President Joko Widodo on 17 December 2019. On 24 August 2021, the toll has officially connected both Balikpapan and Samarinda through the inaugurations of sections I and V. However Audit Board of Indonesia in August 2024 announced that nearly IDR 55 billion has been embezzled by Wijaya Karya from the funds allocated the toll road project. The toll road is also known as the least traveled toll road in Indonesia.

== Development ==
The construction of the 99.3 kilometers (325,787 ft) expressway was started on 12 January 2011. The project was officially inaugurated by Governor of East Kalimantan, but the construction halted in 2012 because of financial shortage. In November 2015, President Joko Widodo relaunched the construction of the toll road. In early September 2019, the toll constructions have achieved 97 percent and predicted will be finished in October 2019. The toll road will also be connected to the proposed new capital city of Indonesia.

== Sections ==
Balikpapan-Samarinda toll road consists of five sections,

- Section 1: starts from KM 13 to Samboja along 21.95 kilometers (72,014 ft); it is formally opened on 21 August 2021
- Section 2: from Samboja to Muara Jawa along 30.05 kilometers (98,589 ft), it is formally opened on 17 December 2019;
- Section 3: from Muara Jawa to Palaran along 18.2 kilometers (59,711 ft), it is formally opened on 17 December 2019;
- Section 4: from Palaran to Samarinda (north of the Mahakam) is 17.15 kilometers (56,266 ft) long, it is formally opened on 17 December 2019;
- Section 5: from Km 13 Balikpapan to Manggar is 11.09 kilometers (36,385 ft) long; it is formally opened on 21 August 2021.

== Exits ==
The entire route is located in East Kalimantan.

Regency	Location	km	mi	Exit	Name	Destinations	Notes
Balikpapan	Manggar	0.0	0.0	0.0	Manggar Ramp	Manggar, East Balikpapan	Southeastern terminus
Balikpapan	Manggar	1.8	1.1	Manggar Toll Gate			
Balikpapan	North Balikpapan	11.1	6.9	11	Karang Joang Toll Gate	Karang Joang, Balikpapan, Kariangau	
Kutai Kartanegara	Samboja	33.1	20.6	33	Samboja Toll Gate	Samboja, Sepaku	
Samarinda	Palaran	88	55	88.2	Loa Janan Ramp	Loa Janan, Palaran Stadium, Tenggarong	Northwest-bound exit & Southeast-bound entry only
Samarinda	Palaran	88.2	54.8	Palaran Toll Gate			
Samarinda	Palaran	95.0	59.0	95	Samarinda Ramp	Samarinda, Sambutan, Sanga-Sanga	Northwestern terminus
1.000 mi = 1.609 km; 1.000 km = 0.621 mi: Electronic toll collection; Incomplete access

== See also ==
- Trans-Kalimantan Highway Southern Route
