= Hyland Cinema =

- Hyland Cinema logo in current iteration

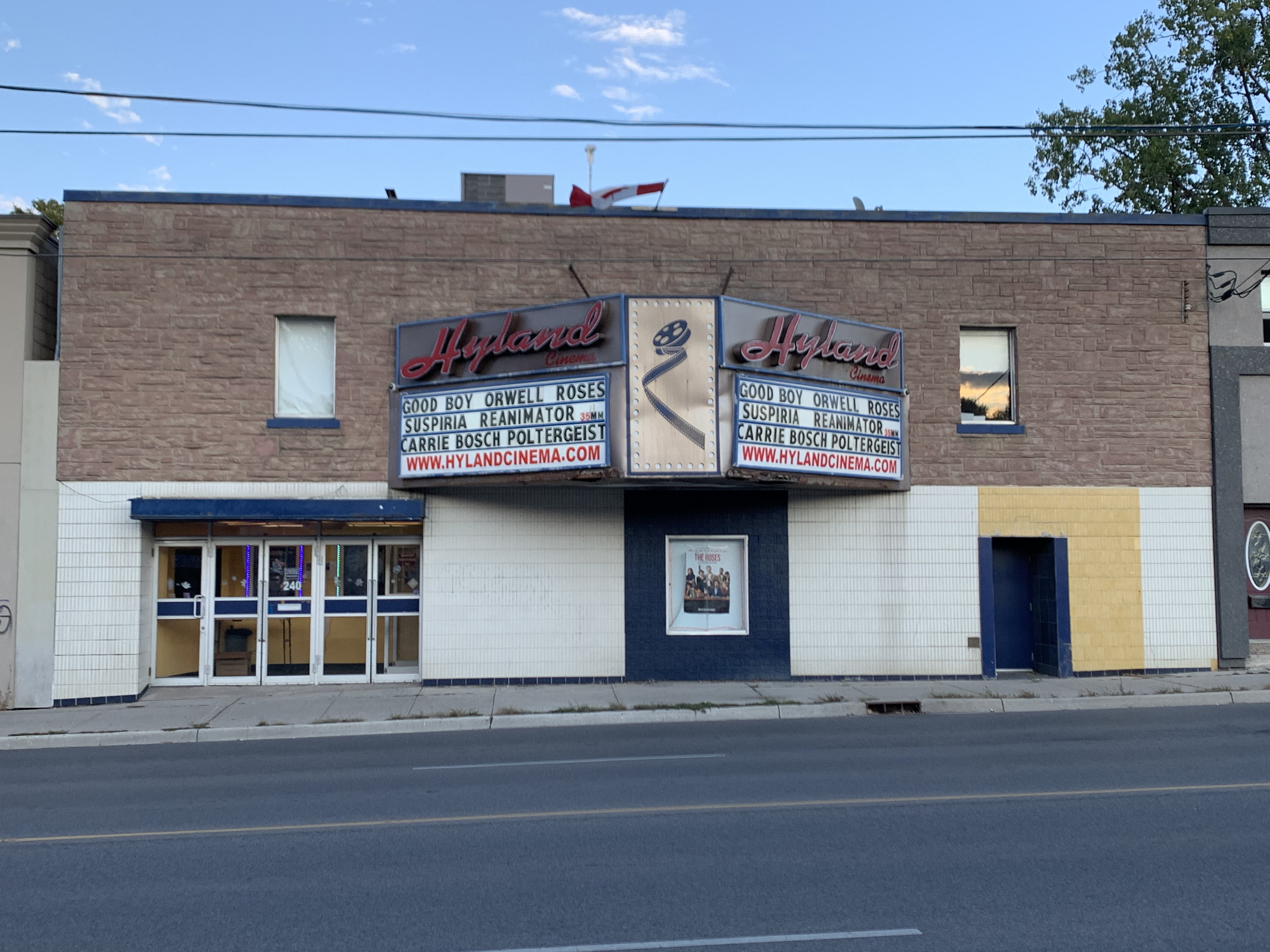
- The Hyland Cinema façade in 2025
- Former names: The Elmwood Theatre

General information
- Location: 240 Wharncliffe Rd S, London, London, Ontario, Canada
- Coordinates: 42.96964°N 81.26146°W
- Opened: September 10, 1937

Technical details
- Floor count: 3

Other information
- Seating capacity: 612 originally, 514 after 1960's renovation, 414 after 2000's renovation
- Parking: Unmarked gravel parking lot behind building with area of approx. 1314 meters²
- Public transit: London Transit: Wharncliffe at Elmwood NB - #2031 & #2302; Buses: 7, 12 and 93

Website
- https://www.hylandcinema.com/

The Hyland Cinema is an independently owned and operated, single-screen cinema located in London, Ontario, Canada. It's located on Wharncliffe Rd S on the West side of London's historic Wortley Village. Hyland Cinema and its building has changed names and ownership several times since it was built in the 1930s. Since 2004 it has been operated as Hyland Cinema Inc. by wife and husband co-owners Moira and Ali Adlan.

== History ==
=== Origins as The Elmwood Theatre (1937–1947) ===
The Elmwood Theatre in 1937.

The Elmwood Theatre was constructed just South of the intersection of Elmwood Ave (after which it was named) and Wharncliffe Rd. during the Great Depression. The theatre held its gala opening on September 9, 1937 after months of construction. According to The London Free Press, the theatre was a "masterful tribute to the art of modern interior designing" and its foyer featured "chrome metal furniture accentuated by the sky-blue indirect lighting effects."

The Elmwood was a second-run cinema with double features, the first being Road to Glory (1936) and Polo Joe (1936). The Elmwood Theatre was initially a 612-seat theatre and the 3rd theatre built in London, the 1st outside of the downtown. On April 28, 1938 oil was struck on the property, noticed by residents on the surface of water and on cast iron pipes being laid.

In the late 1940's the cinema transitioned to a first-run art house, specializing in British films such as Henry V (1944). Duncan Campbell was appointed The Elmwood's manager in May 1945. In 1947 Harold Knapp transferred from the Roxy Theatre (now the Bijou) in Chesley, ON to become manager of the Elmwood. The Elmwood was among the first cinemas in Canada to screen the Academy Award-winning film The Best Years of Our Lives (1946), beginning a week-long run on Monday May 12, 1947.

=== Acquisition by Odeon and rebranding as Hyland (1947–1989) ===
The theatre was acquired by the Odeon circuit in December 1947 and named Odeon Hyland. In 1959 the cinema was renamed to just Hyland. Its first presentation under the new name was the comedy Carry On Nurse (1959), which ran for 16 weeks, setting a record for the theater. The Hyland maintained its status as a neighbourhood cinema and broke its previous record through a 73-week engagement with The Sound of Music (1965). This earned then manager Dick Drysdale an award for "Showman of the Year" in an international competition for theatre managers.

The theatre experienced success throughout the late 1960s under new manager Ed Leigh, attracting thousands of patrons with films such as The Blue Max (1966), A Man for All Seasons (1966), The Taming of the Shrew (1967), Thoroughly Modern Millie (1967) and Funny Girl (1968).

During the late 1960s, the theatre underwent renovations; the entrance was relocated to the side of the building to expand the lobby and add a concession stand and lower-level washrooms, while the projection and sound systems were upgraded. Seating was reduced from its 612 original capacity to 514 seats.

The Hyland continued screening new films throughout the 1970s, including international films such as The Story of O (1975).

The theatre screened major releases throughout the 1980s, including E.T. the Extra-Terrestrial (1982), The Temple of Doom (1984) and Back to the Future (1985). In September 1988, the Hyland was the site of picketing from religious groups over its screening of Martin Scorsese's The Last Temptation of Christ (1988). Over 40 youth from Glad Tidings Assembly, from as young as 13 and old as 18, picketed the September 2 screening of the movie chanting various religious slogans and holding signs. Youth pastor Darrell McIntyre led the march and told reporters "anybody that changed the world shouldn't be portrayed as some weakling."

After Cineplex Odeon opened the six-screen Galleria Cinema Complex on Wellington St, the Hyland was closed on August 17, 1989. Cineplex Odeon left the screen, seats, and projectors intact. Its closure made the Park, operated by Famous Players, the only single-screen, first-run theatre in London until it closed the following month.

=== Acquisition and conversion to Word of Life Centre (1989–1994) ===
In September 1989, the building was purchased from Cineplex Odeon by the Christian Centre of London Inc. While the official sale price wasn't revealed, business consultant Bruce Lockhart said the theatre and its one-third hectare property was worth "more than half a million dollars" (over one million CAD in 2025). It was sold on the condition "the London church group not run commercial movies nor sell the half-century-old cinema to someone who would."

The Christian Centre used the building as a "film ministry" and renamed the building "Word of Life Centre." The non-denominational Christian assembly moved in on October 1, 1989. In addition to holding assemblies in the theatre, the Christian Centre applied for permits to open a daycare centre in the building's basement.

=== Dormancy and revival as The Hyland (1994–present) ===
After sitting dormant for "nearly a decade", the building was sold in 2003 to Ali and Moira Alden. Moira was originally from London and taught film and T.V. courses. She met Ali in Abu Dhabi where he owned and operated an art and alternative film cinema. The new owners renovated the theatre's projection, sound systems, and screen. The new Hyland was modeled after other revival house cinemas in Ontario such as the Princess Cinema in Waterloo and Bytowne Cinema in Ottawa. The Hyland re-opened on New Year's Eve 2003, with people "lined along the street" for a free film screening.

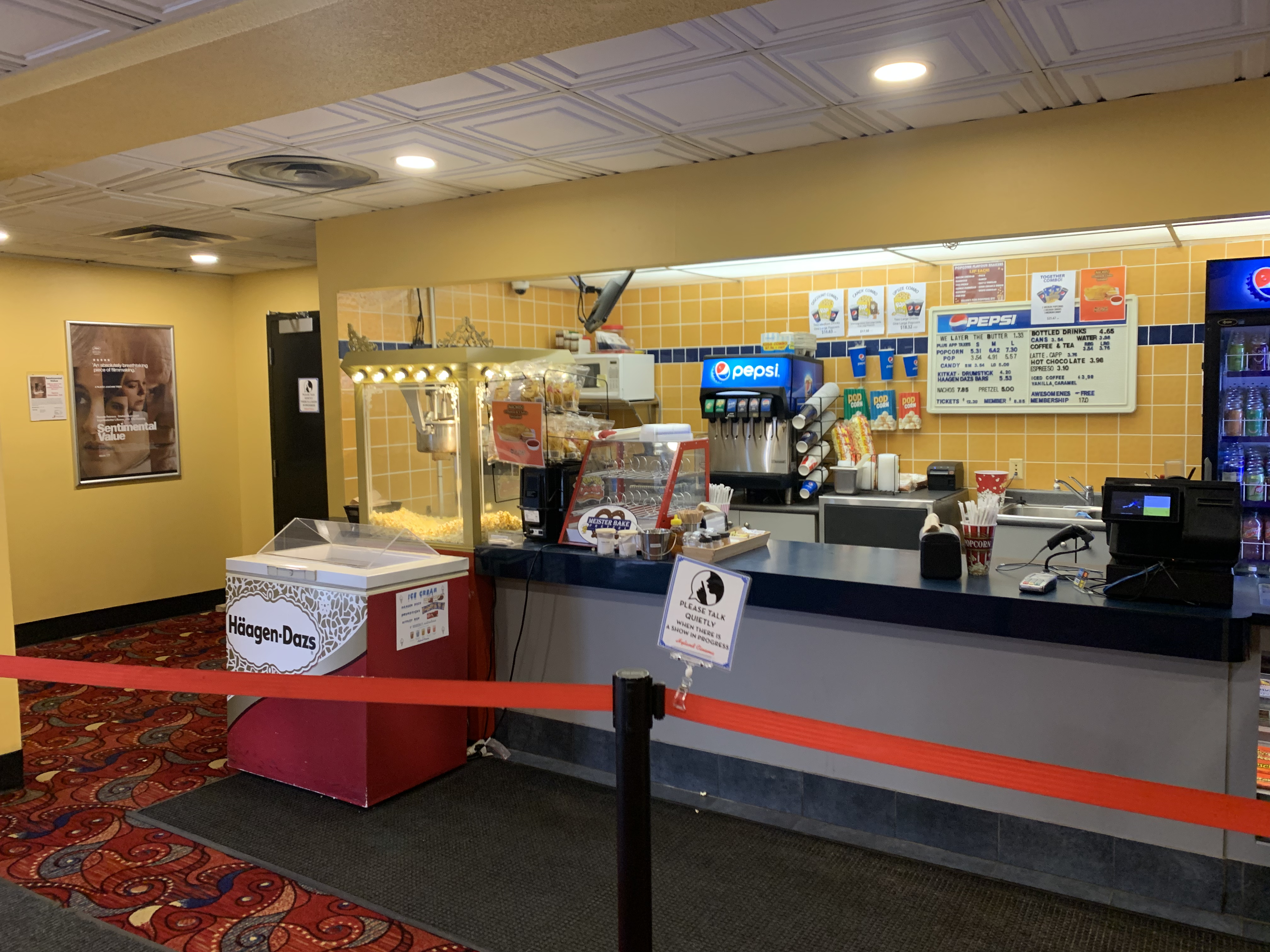
The concession stand of the Hyland Cinema in November 2025.

The newly-independent theatre's first success came from screening Motorcycle Diaries (2004) shortly after opening. By May 2004 the owners weren't sure if the theatre would survive the Summer. The following Spring, Hyland had its biggest success since reopening with March of the Penguins (2005) which put the business on a "promising trajectory."

Throughout the late 2000's and 2010's the Hyland programmed a mix of contemporary commercial films, older films and selections from major international festivals like TIFF, Cannes, and Sundance, and positioned itself as a venue for art house and international cinema. Hyland screened several independent films shot in London, Ontario by London-based directors such as Robert McCallum's Unearthly (2013) and Darryl Callcott's Liminality (2014). Up until 2019, Moira stated "business was booming."

In September 2025 Hyland announced its 5th annual "Horror at the Hyland" festival and for the first time offered a "Friday Night Fright Pass" granting purchasers a discount to five movies in the festival, as well as a t-shirt and food and drink discounts at local bar The Holy Diver.

==== Recovery after COVID-19 pandemic ====
Due to the COVID-19 pandemic, the Hyland faced significant financial challenges that threatened its continued operation. The cinema had to shut down at the start of the pandemic in mid-March 2020, and wasn't able to re-open until July 1, 2020, after pivoting to a drive-in theatre. A projector screen was constructed in the gravel parking lot behind the cinema with help from co-owner Moira Adlan's brother. The lot could accommodate 40 cars, with concessions and merchandise being sold to patrons by staff walking throughout the lot.

The drive-in opened with two sold-out Canada Day screenings of Canadian Bacon (1995) on July 1, 2020 and featured more films in the following weeks such as a 45th anniversary screening of Jaws (1975). By July 24, 2020, the indoor theatre was re-opened with only 50 of its 414 seats available for patrons wearing face masks and practicing social distancing. The company took out several loans to cover bills, salaries and distribution rights.

In July 2023, Moira Adlan stated the cinema was receiving about 50% of its former attendance pre-pandemic. The theatre was described as operating "month-by-month," with its long-term survival dependent on maintaining community patronage. A "Save the Hyland" fundraising campaign was initiated to engage public support and secure the cinema's future as the city's last remaining independent movie theatre. A strong programming calendar of new and classic movies kept the Hyland afloat, along with an outpouring of community support, and the business is returning to pre-pandemic levels.

==== Addition of 70mm projector ====
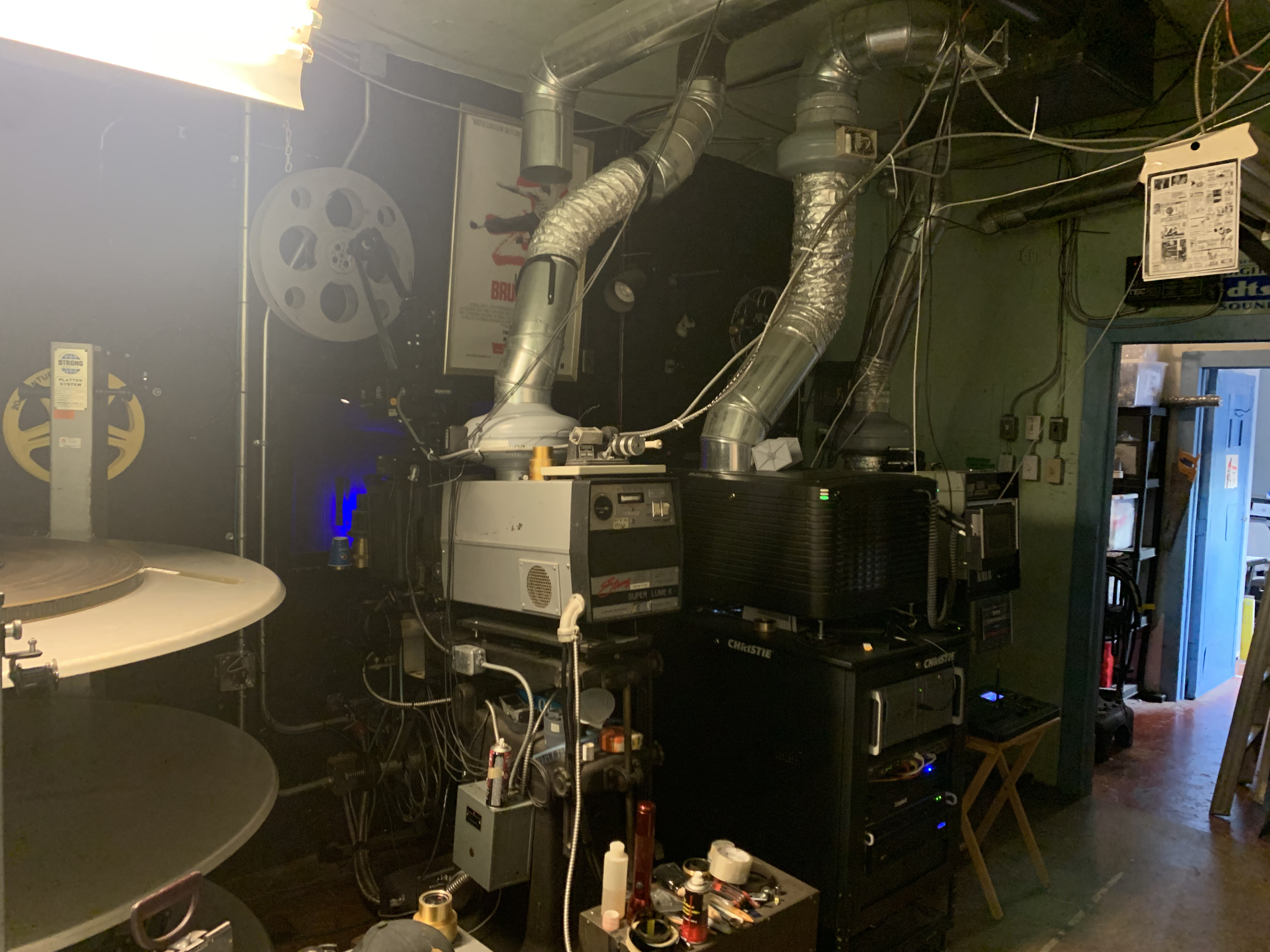
The projection room featuring their 35mm, 70mm and digital projectors- and Back to the Future on 35mm print (left).

In October 2025 Hyland installed a refurbished 70mm Xenex II film projector, making it the only cinema in Ontario West of Toronto with the ability to screen 70mm films and one of six in all of Canada.

== See also ==
- Cinema of Canada
- London, Ontario
- Revival house
