= West Samboja =

District of Kutai Kartanegara Regency, East Kalimantan

West Samboja Samboja Barat
- District
- Interactive map of West Samboja
- Location West Samboja (Indonesia)
- Coordinates: 1°5′17.97842″S 116°57′13.97718″E
- Country: Indonesia
- Province: East Kalimantan
- Regency: Kutai Kartanegara
- Established: 19 October 2020
- District seat: Tani Bakti

Government
  - District head (Camat): Burhanuddin

Area
  - Total: 415.92 km^{2} (160.59 sq mi)

Population (2023)
  - Total: 31,513
  - Density: 75.767/km^{2} (196.24/sq mi)
- Time zone: UTC+8 (ICT)
- Regional code: 64.02.20
- Villages: 10

West Samboja (Indonesian: Samboja Barat, Indonesian pronunciation: [samˌbodʒa ˈbarat̪̚]) is a district in Kutai Kartanegara Regency, East Kalimantan, Indonesia. As of 2023, it was inhabited by 31,513 people, and currently has a total area of 415.92 km^{2}. Its district seat is located at the village of Tani Bakti.

West Samboja was created from western parts of Samboja on 19 October 2020, and it is the youngest district in the regency along with Kota Bangun Darat. It borders Loa Janan and Muara Jawa to the north; Samboja to the east; West Balikpapan, Central Balikpapan, and East Balikpapan (Balikpapan) to the south; and Sepaku (Penajam North Paser) to the northwest.

== Governance ==
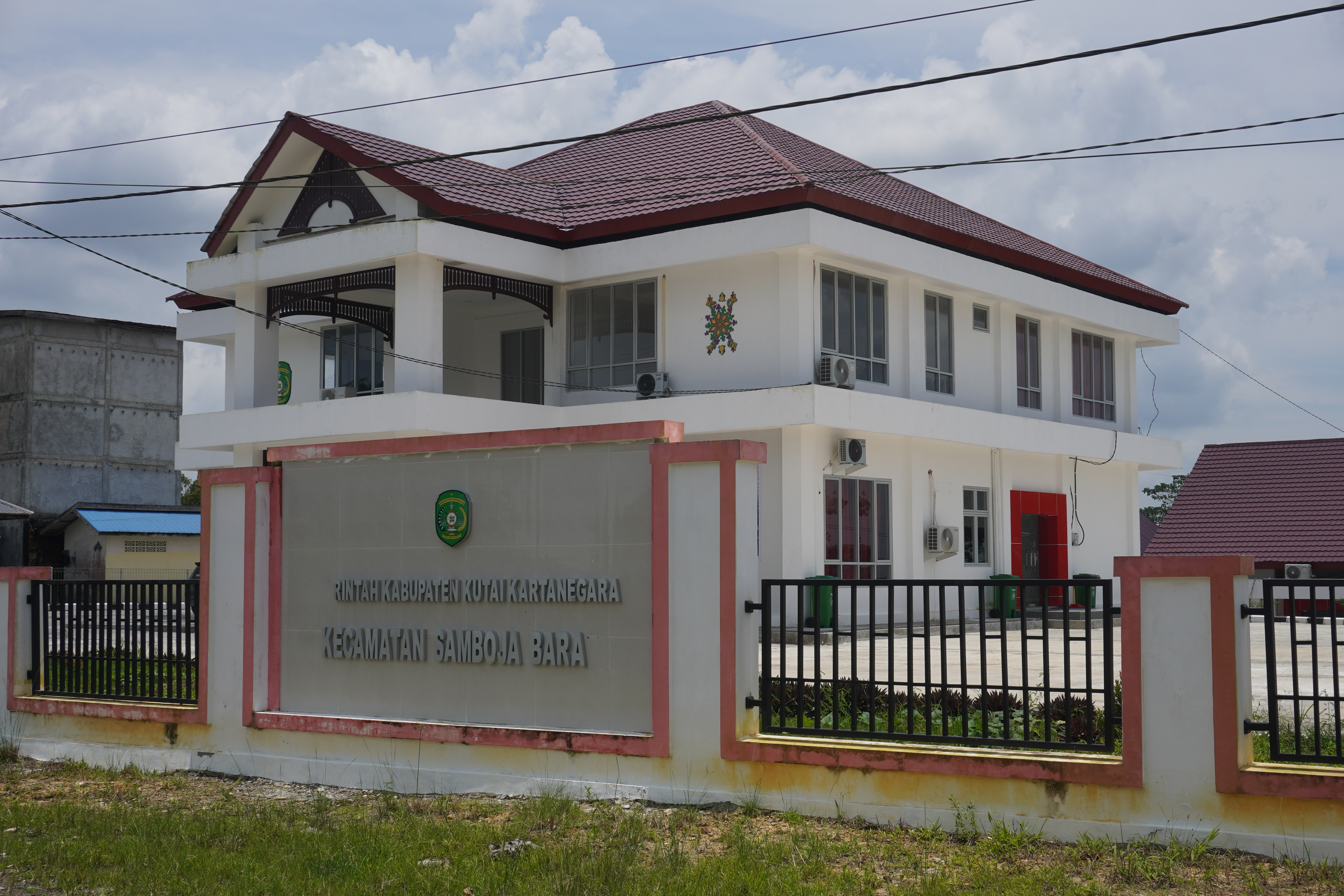
District head office at Tani Bakti, West Samboja.

=== Villages ===
Samboja is divided into the following 10 villages (the rest are urban kelurahan, rural desa are marked by grey background):

Regional code (Kode wilayah)	Name	Area (km^{2})	Population (2023)	RT (rukun tetangga)
64.02.20.1001	Bukit Merdeka	95.71	5,158	22
64.02.20.1002	Sungai Merdeka	102.44	6,975	30
64.02.20.1003	Karya Merdeka	95.82	7,124	31
64.02.20.2004	Tani Bhakti	13.58	1,905	10
64.02.20.1005	Amborawang Darat	19.47	2,921	12
64.02.20.1006	Argosari	8.59	726	5
64.02.20.1007	Salok Api Darat	17.68	1,873	10
64.02.20.1008	Salok Api Laut	7.45	1,408	10
64.02.20.1009	Amborawang Laut	29.49	1,951	8
64.02.20.1010	Margomulyo	25.69	1,472	7
	Totals	415.92	31,513	143
