= Sanga-Sanga, Kutai Kartanegara =

Sanga-Sanga
- District
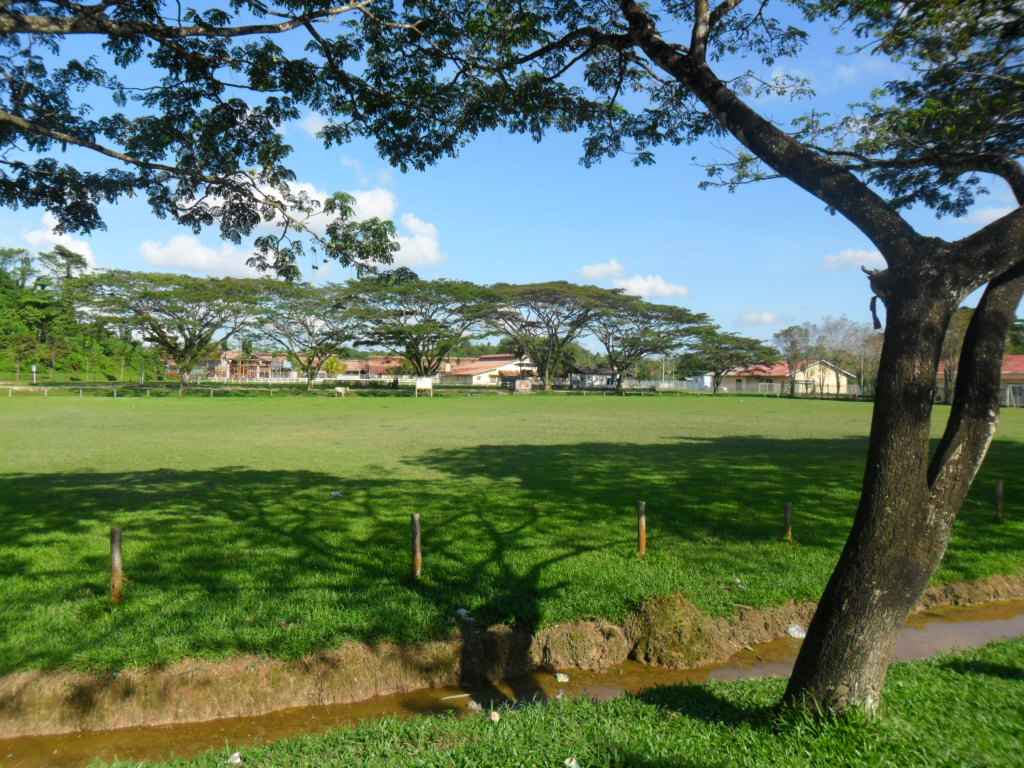
- Gelora Patra Field
- Interactive map of Sanga-Sanga
- Location Sanga-Sanga (Indonesia)
- Coordinates: 0°41′S 117°15′E
- Country: Indonesia
- Province: East Kalimantan
- Regency: Kutai Kartanegara
- District seat: Sanga-Sanga Dalam

Government
  - District head (Camat): Muhammad Dachriansyah

Area
  - Total: 233.40 km^{2} (90.12 sq mi)

Population (2023)
  - Total: 20,969
  - Density: 89.841/km^{2} (232.69/sq mi)
- Time zone: UTC+8 (ICT)
- Regional code: 64.02.15
- Villages: 5

Sanga-Sanga (Indonesian pronunciation: [ˈsaŋa ˈsaŋa]) is a district in Kutai Kartanegara Regency, East Kalimantan, Indonesia. As of 2023, it was inhabited by 20,969 people (an increase from 11,855 people in 2005), and currently has the total area of 233.40 km^{2}. Its district seat is located at the village of Sanga-Sanga Dalam.

Sanga-Sanga borders Palaran (Samarinda) and Loa Janan (narrow border) to the west, and Muara Jawa to the south. This district is an important oil-producing area.

== History ==
Before becoming an oil-producing region, Sanga-Sanga was home to traditional fishers, famous for its fishes, copra, and other spices. On 19 October 1850, the Sultanate of Kutai Kertanegara under Aji Muhammad Sulaiman's rule gave concession to the Dutch, therefore allowing them to conduct research and exploration throughout the region. In 1888, oil was successfully discovered in Sanga-Sanga by a Dutch mining expert J.H. Menten along with his team. The concessions were named Louise (Dutch pronunciation: [ˈluizə]) and Mathilde (Dutch pronunciation: [maˈtɪldə], also locally nicknamed as sumur Noni after a lady who fell victim while digging), and both were also given to the respective oil wells. Oil first sprayed at Mathilde on 20 February 1897, giving new hopes for the recovery of Dutch bankruptcy. That date has also been regarded as the anniversary of Sanga-Sanga.

During its height, there were 613 wells which produced around 70,000 ton of oil a month, as well as 7 docks or bridges. New immigrants, especially males, also came to work in Sanga-Sanga, including Javanese, Buginese, Banjarese, Madurese, Manado, and foreign groups such as Arabs, Chinese, and Indians. They also later married with locals of Sanga-Sanga.

Sanga-Sanga is the site of several battles. The most notable one, known as the Red-and-White Incident, occurred on 27 January 1947 against the NICA, during the Indonesian National Revolution. It eventually became the Commemoration of the Red-and-White, held annually on that date.

From 24 April 1969 until 21 October 1987, along with Muara Jawa and Samboja, Sanga-Sanga belonged to Samarinda, until these districts were returned to Kutai that date. The village of Bantuas, however, still remained within Samarinda, but transferred to Palaran.

== Governance ==
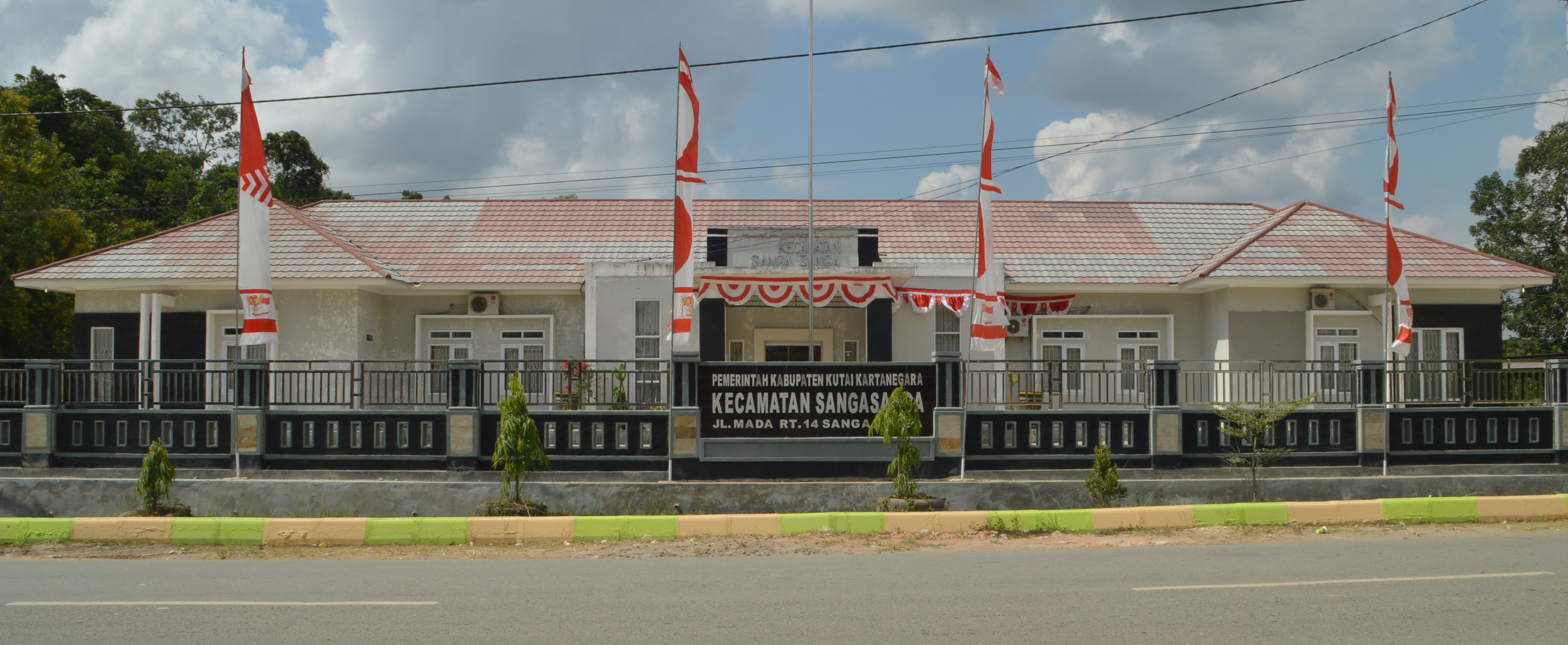
District head office at Sanga-Sanga Dalam, Sanga-Sanga.

=== Villages ===
Sanga-Sanga is divided into the following 5 villages (kelurahan):

Regional code (Kode wilayah)	Name	Area (km^{2})	Population (2023)	RT (rukun tetangga)
64.02.15.1001	Jawa	25.93	4,055	9
64.02.15.1002	Sanga-Sanga Dalam	55.42	8,329	24
64.02.15.1003	Pendingin	58.83	3,661	12
64.02.15.1004	Sarijaya	22.81	1,708	10
64.02.15.1005	Sanga-Sanga Muara	35.81	3,216	11
	Totals	233.40	20,969	66
