= 1947 Academy Awards =

1947 Academy Awards may refer to:

- 19th Academy Awards, the Academy Awards ceremony that took place in 1947
- 20th Academy Awards, the 1948 ceremony honoring the best in film for 1947
