= London Normal School =

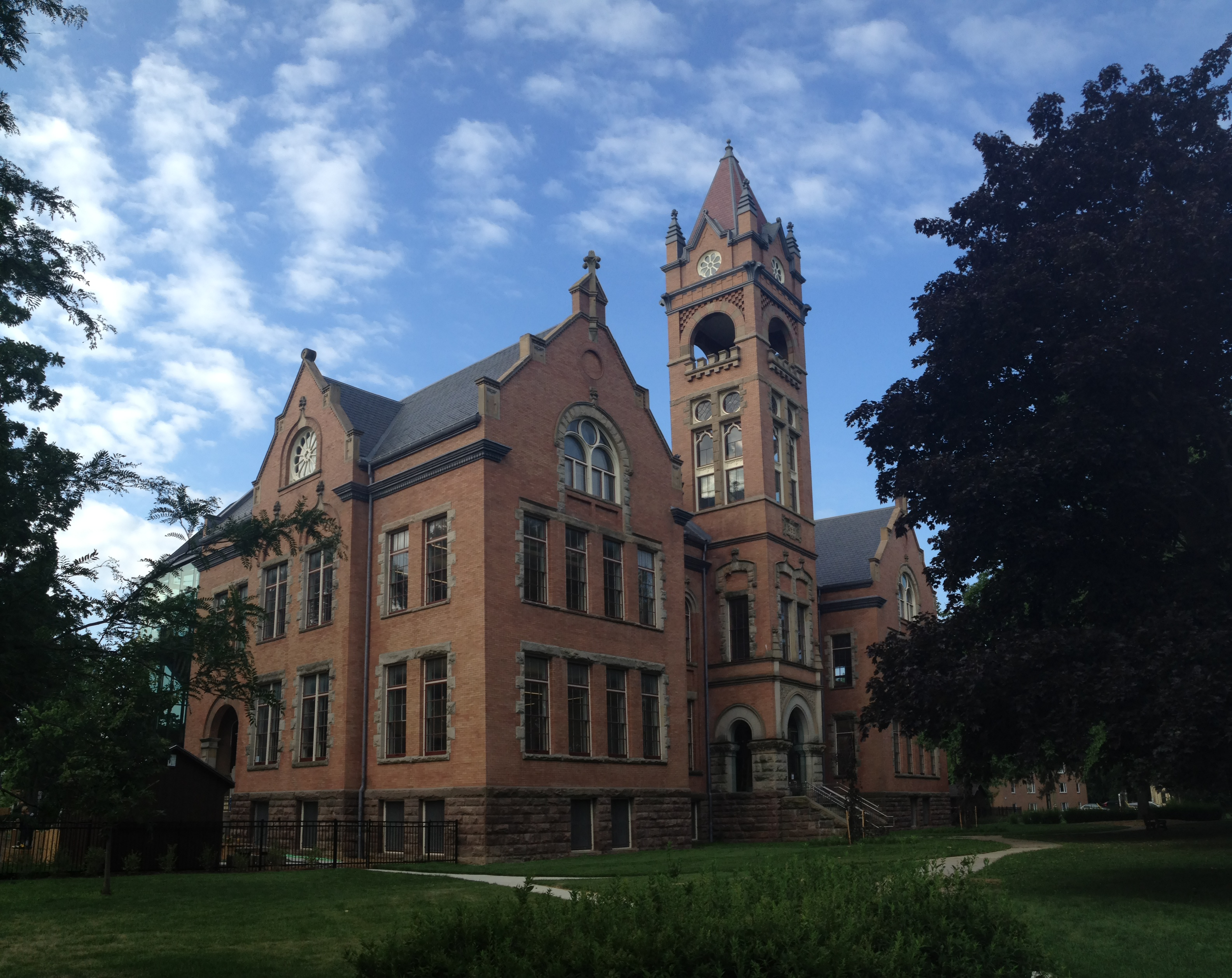
London Normal School

The London Normal School is an Ontario Heritage building located at 165 Elmwood Avenue in the Wortley Village neighbourhood of London, Ontario, Canada. It is a prominent and recognizable landmark in the Old South/Wortley Village neighbourhood.

It was built in 1898-1899 by the architect Francis Heakes. It was the third normal school in Ontario, after the Toronto Normal School and Ottawa Normal School. The building is a mixture of classical, Romanesque, and Gothic revival architecture, as was typical of High Victorian Gothic style.

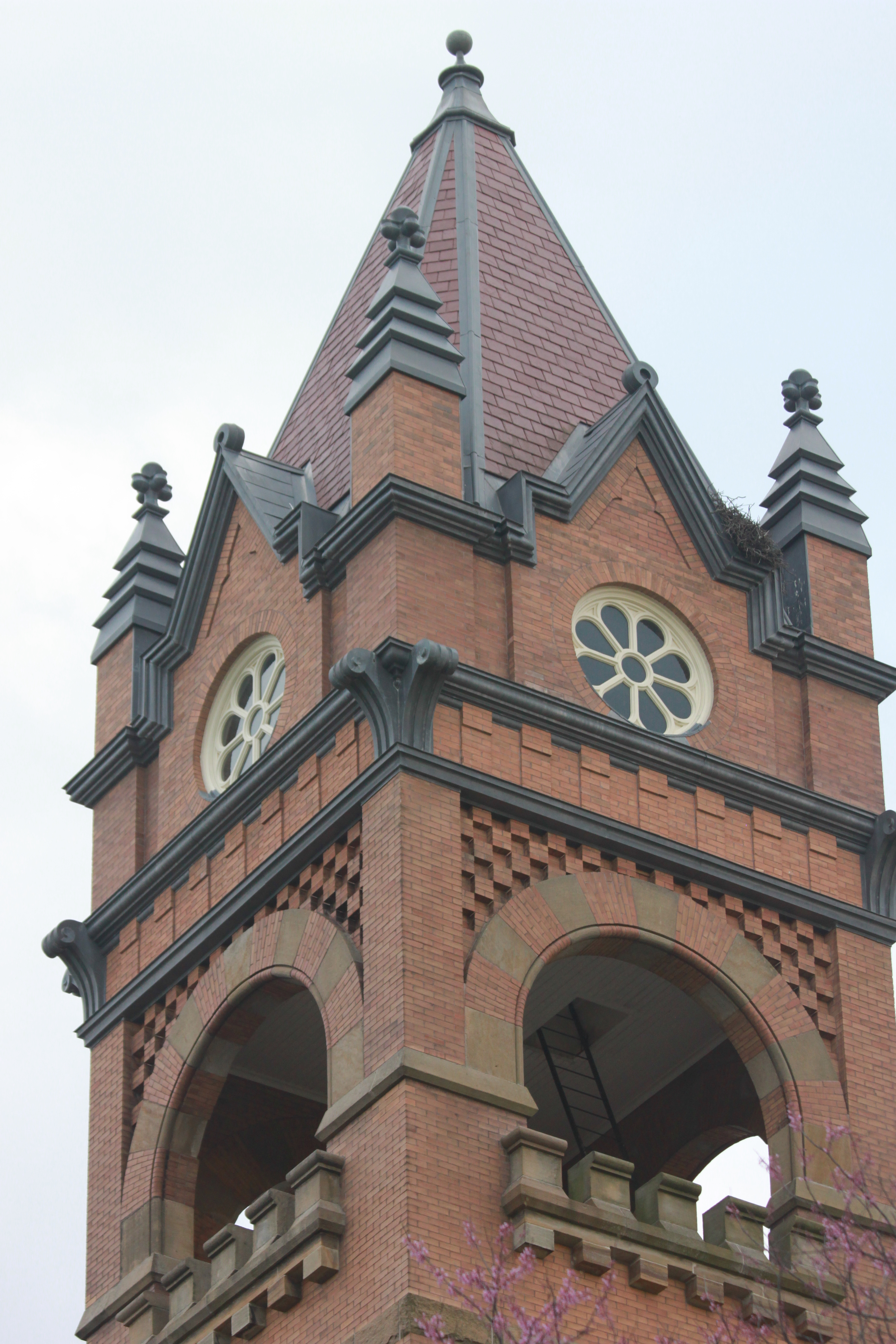
London Normal School tower

Classes for teachers in training began on February 1, 1900. By the 1960s, teacher training took place at Elborn College and Althouse College (now the University of Western Ontario Faculty of Education). In 1963, the Normal School became the headquarters of the London Board of Education. In 1986, it became the Monsignor Feeney Centre for Catholic Education within the London District Catholic School Board.

The Catholic School Board moved to a new building in 2005 and the Normal School was vacant for a time afterwards. It is currently the headquarters for the YMCA of Southwestern Ontario.

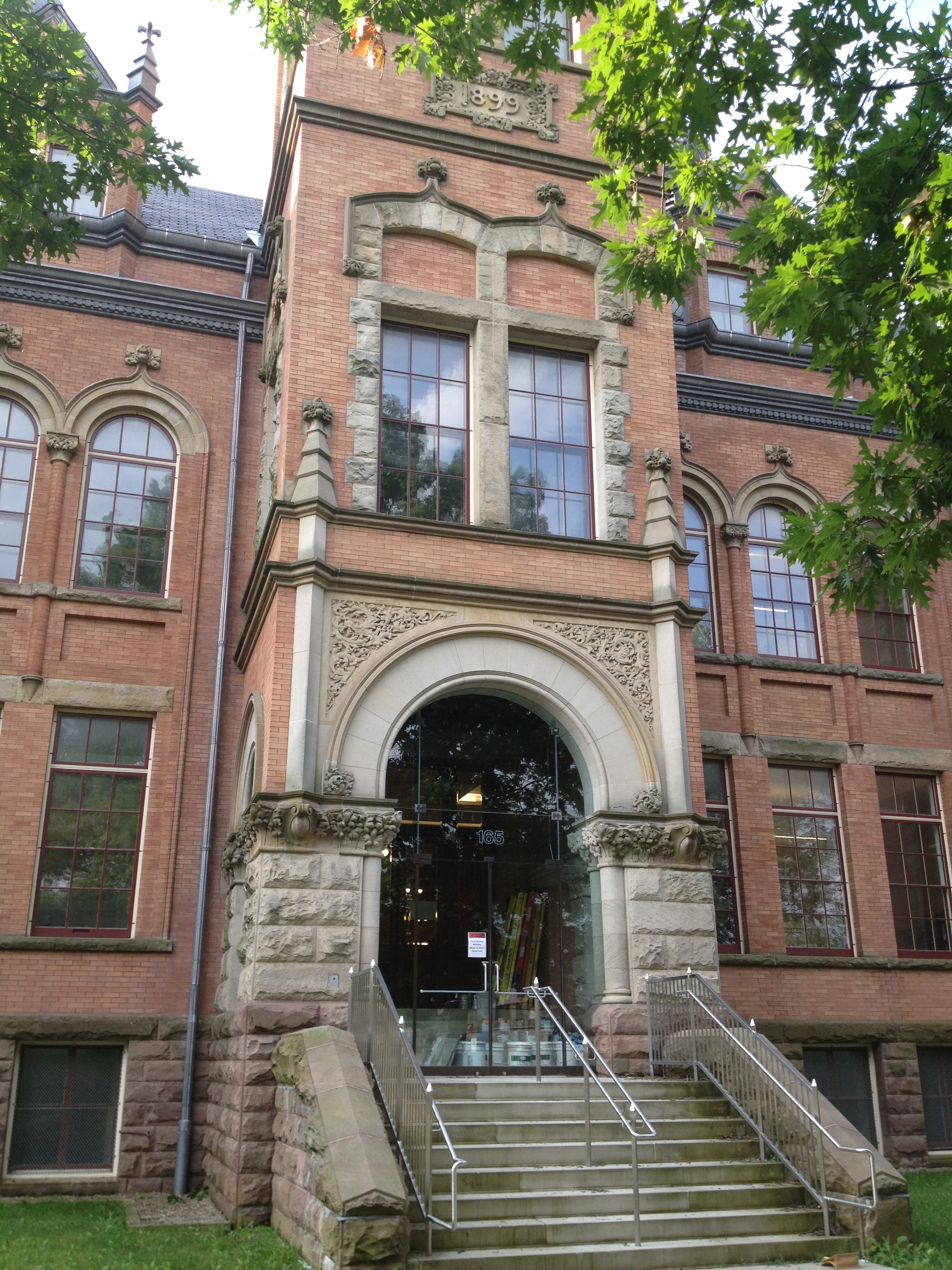
London Normal School, front entrance

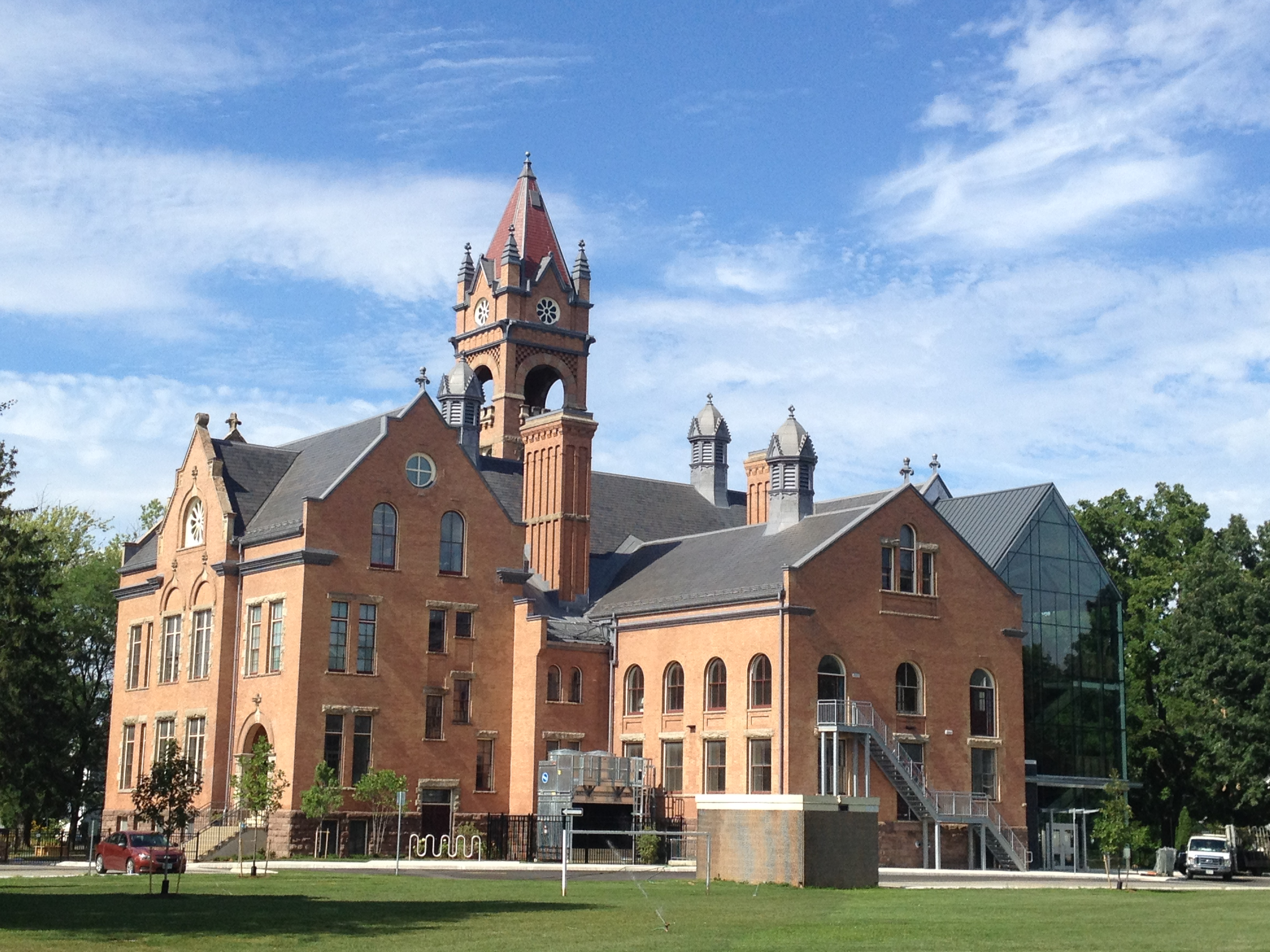
London Normal School, rear

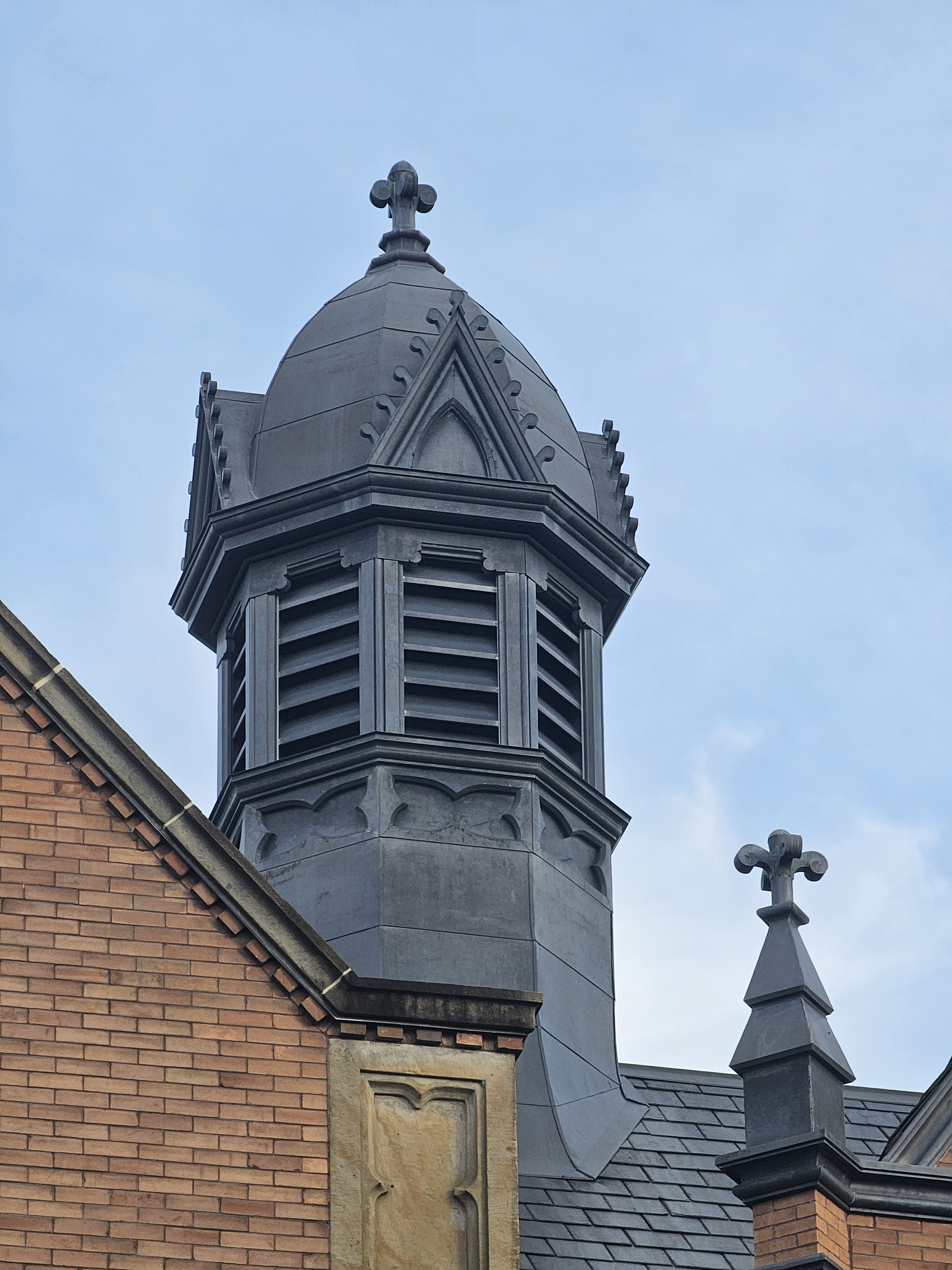
Detail of an Octagonal Cupola on the roof of the London Normal school
