= Palaran Stadium =

Stadium in Indonesia

Coordinates: 0°35′10″S 117°07′54″E

Stadion Palaran
- Kaltim Main Stadium
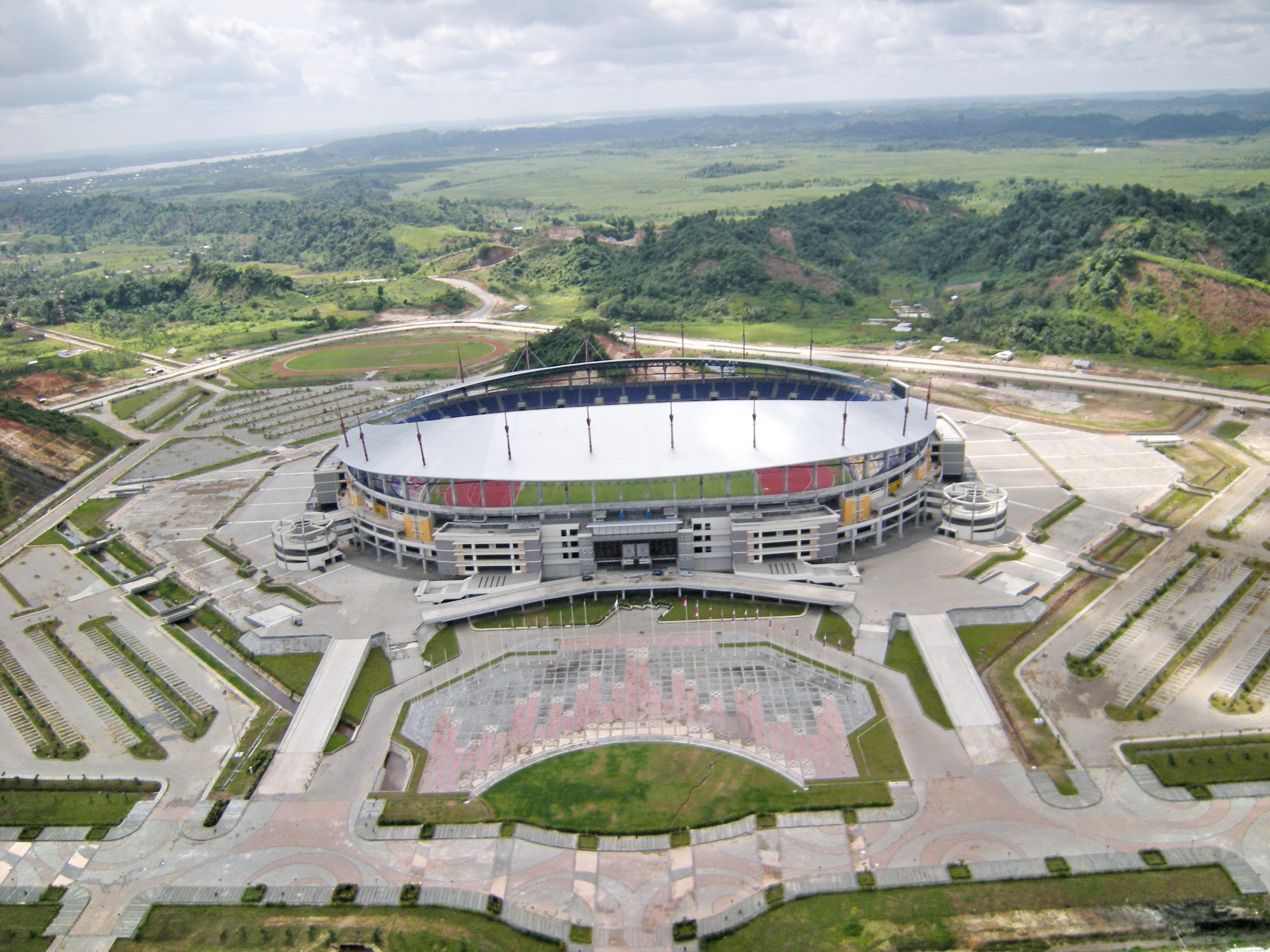
- Aerial View of Palaran Stadium
- Interactive map of Stadion Palaran
- Location: Palaran, Samarinda, East Kalimantan, Indonesia
- Owner: Government of East Kalimantan Province
- Operator: Palaran Stadium Management Unit
- Capacity: 35,000
- Surface: Grass

Construction
- Groundbreaking: 2002
- Opened: 18 June 2008; 18 years ago
- Cost: IDR 800 Billion
- Architect: I Gusti Ngurah Antaryama

Palaran Stadium is a sports venue located in Samarinda, the capital city of East Kalimantan province. It is a multi-purpose stadium centering the East Kalimantan Main Stadium Sports Complex. It was opened in 2008 and has a seating capacity of 35,000. It is the largest stadium on the island of Borneo. The stadium was the main venue for the 2008 Indonesia National Games. It is the first Indonesian all-seater stadium. Since 2018, the stadium has not been utilized for any sport events.

== Sport events ==
- 2008 Pekan Olahraga Nasional
- 2008 National Paralympic Week
- 2008–09 Liga Indonesia Premier Division Quarter-finals and Final
- 2016 1st East Kalimantan Governor Cup
- 2018 2nd East Kalimantan Governor Cup

== Gallery ==
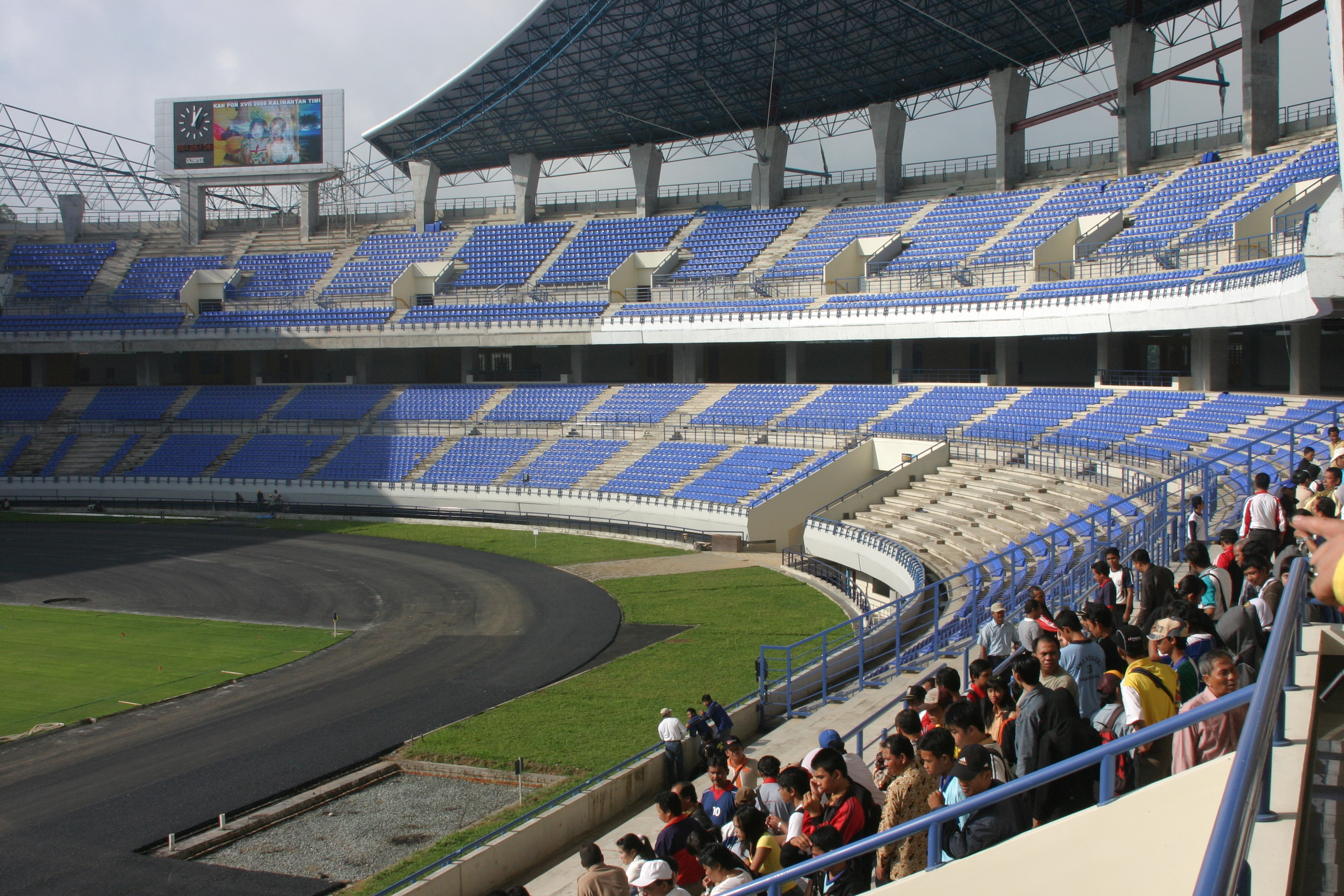
One corner of the Palaran Main Stadium
