= Wortley Village =

Coordinates: 42.9699652902°N 81.251554866°W

- Neighbourhood
- Location within Ontario
- Country: Canada
- Province: Ontario
- City: London

Government
  - Type: Municipal (Ward 11)
  - Administrative body: London City Council
  - Councillor: Skylar Franke
- Elevation: 254 m (833 ft)

Population (2011)
  - Total: 15,525
- Time zone: UTC-5 (Eastern Time Zone)
  - Summer (DST): UTC-4 (Eastern Time Zone)
- Area codes: 519, 226

Wortley Village is a neighbourhood of London, Ontario, Canada. It was originally a suburb of London and was annexed to London in 1890. Wortley Village is home to many heritage properties. The homes in the neighbourhood range from cottages and ranches to mansions. The village is home to the London Normal School, an Ontario heritage building and former teachers' college that now serves as the regional headquarters of the YMCA in Southwestern Ontario and the village's central and most iconic landmark. The main thoroughfare through the Village is Wortley Road, along which many businesses are situated.

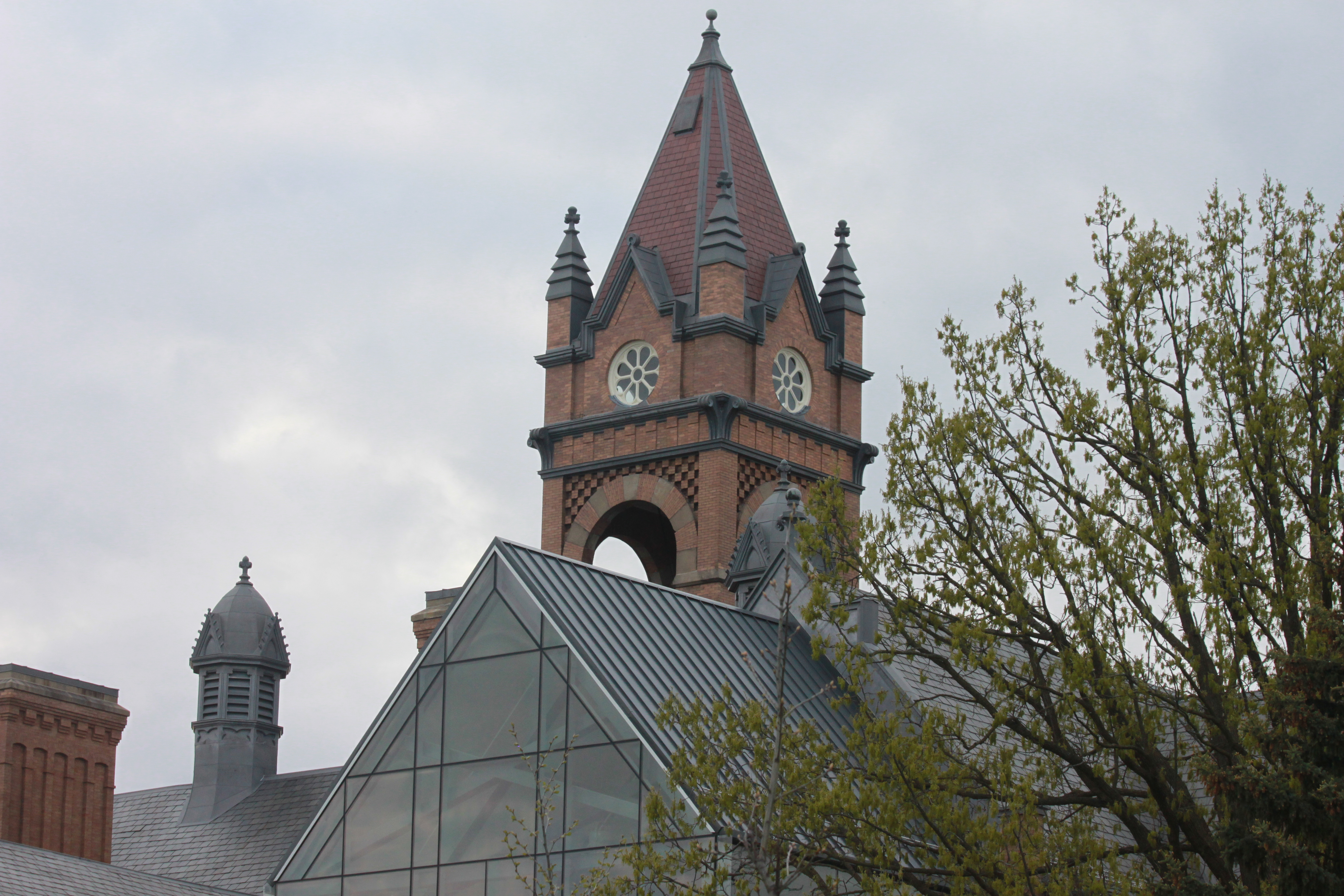
Normal School in May 2021

The village is known locally for hosting the annual Gathering on the Green, a popular festival in which vendors set up stands in the park at Normal School, commonly referred to as the Green. Additional community events that take place in the Village include Halloween in the Village, Christmas in the Village, and Wortley Pride on the Green.
