= Palaran =

District of Samarinda, East Kalimantan

- District
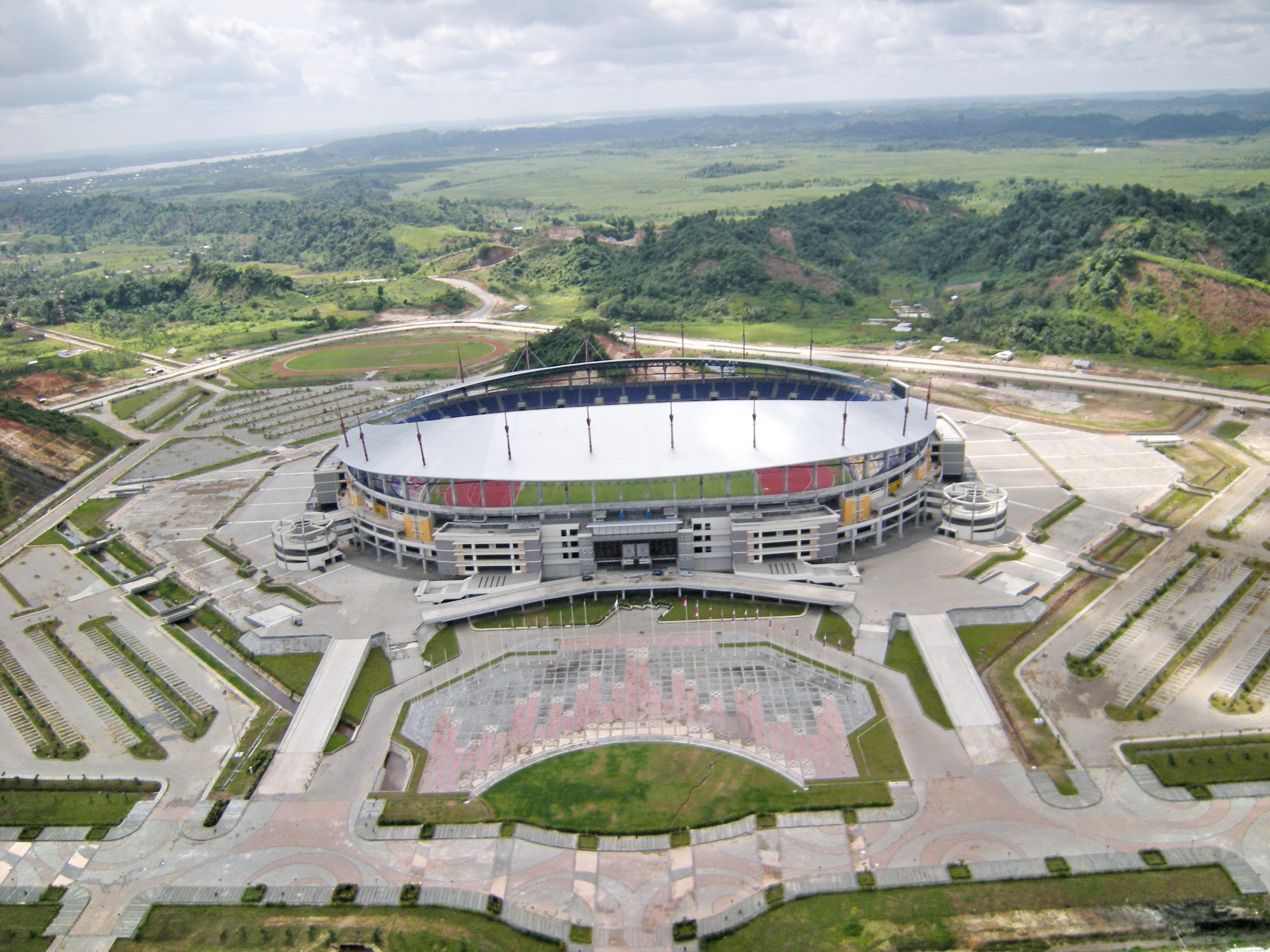
- Palaran Stadium
- Interactive map of Palaran
- Location in Kalimantan and Indonesia Palaran (Indonesia)
- Coordinates: 0°33′54.81605″S 117°10′22.93216″E
- Country: Indonesia
- Province: East Kalimantan
- Regency: Samarinda
- Established: 24 April 1969
- District seat: Rawa Makmur

Government
  - District head (Camat): Muhammad Dahlan

Area
  - Total: 210.15 km^{2} (81.14 sq mi)

Population (2023)
  - Total: 66,912
  - Density: 318.40/km^{2} (824.66/sq mi)
- Time zone: UTC+8 (ICT)
- Postal code: 75241 - 75253
- Regional code: 64.72.01
- Villages: 5

Palaran (Indonesian pronunciation: [paˈlaran]) is a district of the Samarinda, East Kalimantan, Indonesia. As of 2023, it was inhabited by 66,912 people, and currently has a total area of 210.15 km^{2}. Its district seat is located at the village of Rawa Makmur.

Before 24 April 1969, Palaran was originally part of Anggana in Kutai Regency. Since then, it has been part of Samarinda, following gubernatorial decrees numbered 18/TH-Pem/1969 (released 2 February) and 55/TH-Pem/1969 (released 24 April). The district is also home to the Palaran Stadium, which hosted the 2008 Pekan Olahraga Nasional.

== Governance ==
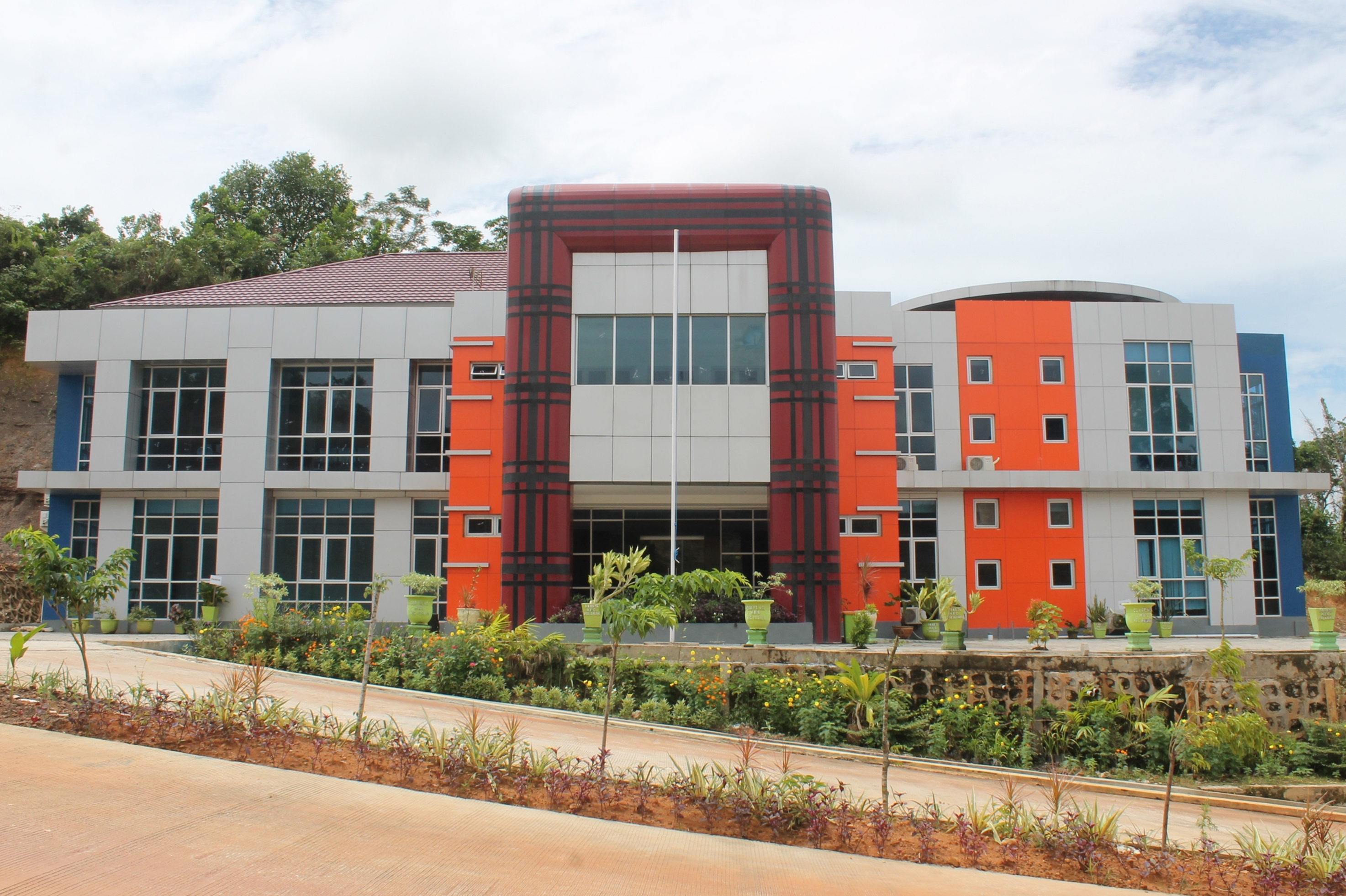
District head office at Rawa Makmur, Palaran.

=== Villages ===
Palaran is divided into the following 5 villages (kelurahan):

Regional code (Kode wilayah)	Name	Area (km^{2})	Population (2023)	RT (rukun tetangga)
64.72.01.1001	Rawa Makmur	11.87	24,168	52
64.72.01.1002	Handil Bakti	72.00	11,010	32
64.72.01.1003	Bukuan	27.2	17,173	47
64.72.01.1004	Simpang Pasir	24.14	9,755	25
64.72.01.1005	Bantuas	74.94	4,806	14
	Totals	210.15	66,912	170

Before 21 October 1987, Bantuas was originally part of neighbouring Sanga-Sanga, when rest of the district was returned to Kutai Regency, Bantuas still remains part of Samarinda.
