= Muara Jawa =

- District
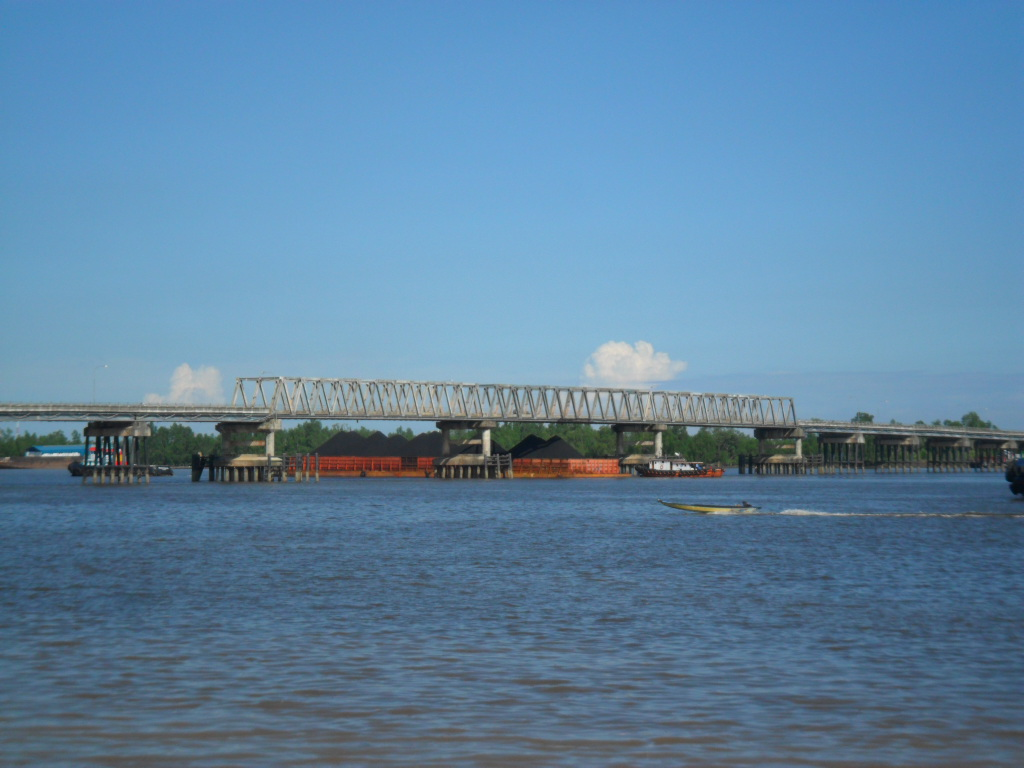
- Dondang Bridge
- Interactive map of Muara Jawa
- Location Muara Jawa (Indonesia)
- Coordinates: 0°49′17.84183″S 117°14′3.36865″E
- Country: Indonesia
- Province: East Kalimantan
- Regency: Kutai Kartanegara
- District seat: Muara Jawa Ulu

Government
  - District head (Camat): Muhammad Ramli

Area
  - Total: 619.16 km^{2} (239.06 sq mi)

Population (2025)
  - Total: 49,317
  - Density: 79.651/km^{2} (206.30/sq mi)
- Time zone: UTC+8 (ICT)
- Regional code: 64.02.14
- Villages: 8

Muara Jawa is an administrative district {kecamatan) in Kutai Kartanegara Regency, East Kalimantan, Indonesia. It held 33,923 inhabitants as at the 2010 Census, and 41,561 inhabitants at the 2020 Census. As of 2025, it was inhabited by 49,317 people, and currently has the total land area of 619.16 km^{2}. Its district seat is located at the village of Muara Jawa Ulu.

The district is situated to the south of the major city of Samarinda, and borders the districts of Sanga-Sanga to the north, Loa Janan to the east, and Samboja to the south. To the east it borders upon the numerous large islands in the widespread estuary of the Mahakam River where it discharges into the Makassar Strait. Of the many islands which comprise the estuary, which it shares with Anggana District, those in the southern part of the estuary (notably Bukuan, Cerocok, Kerbau, Layangan, Merdeka, South Merdeka, Central Merdeka, North Merdeka, Muaraulu, Nibung, Pegah, Greater Perangatan and Lesser Perangatan islands) belong to Muara Jawa District.

From 24 April 1969 until 21 October 1987, Muara Jawa belonged to Samarinda, along with Sanga-Sanga and Samboja Districts, until these districts were returned to Kutai Kartanegara on that date.

== Governance ==
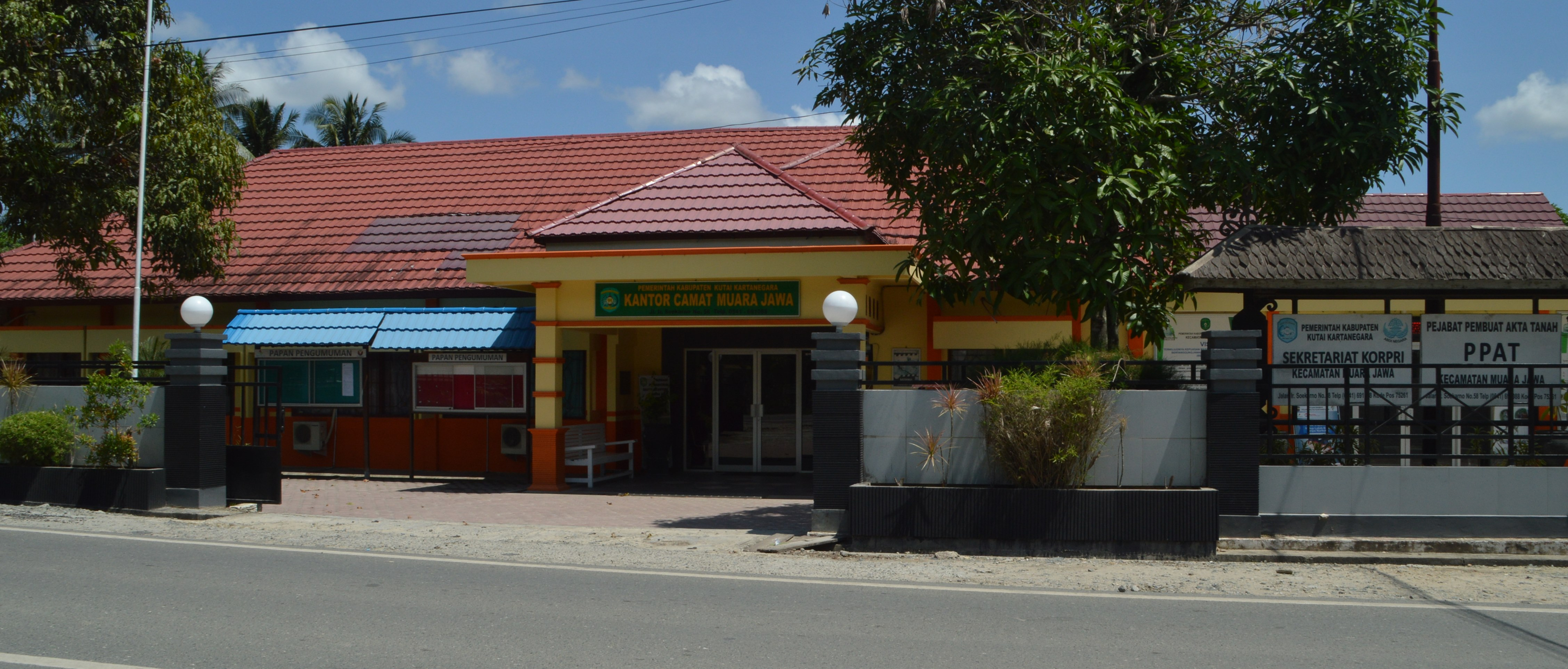
District head office at Muara Jawa Ulu, Sanga-Sanga.

=== Villages ===
Muara Jawa District is divided into the following eight villages (all classed as kelurahan), listed below with their areas, their populations as at mid 2023, and their post codes:

| Regional code (Kode wilayah) | Name | Area (km^{2}) | Pop'n (2023) | RT (rukun tetangga) | Post code |
|---|---|---|---|---|---|
| 64.02.14.1004 | Teluk Dalam | 215.93 | 3,822 | 15 | 75262 |
| 64.02.14.1001 | Muara Jawa Ilir | 13.41 | 6,014 | 20 | 75263 |
| 64.02.14.1002 | Central Muara Jawa (Muara Jawa Tengah) | 39.78 | 13,533 | 20 | 75264 |
| 64.02.14.1003 | Muara Jawa Ulu | 27.36 | 4,540 | 11 | 75261 |
| 64.02.14.1005 | Dondang | 30.51 | 2,931 | 14 | 75265 |
| 64.02.14.1006 | Tamapole | 15.17 | 526 | 28 | 76266 |
| 64.02.14.1007 | Muara Kembang | 261.00 | 3,750 | 16 | 76267 |
| 64.02.14.1008 | Muara Jawa Pesisir | 12.60 | 12,552 | 15 | 76263 |
| | Totals | 619.16 | 44,070 | 139 | |
