= Samboja =

District of Kutai Kartanegara Regency, East Kalimantan

- District
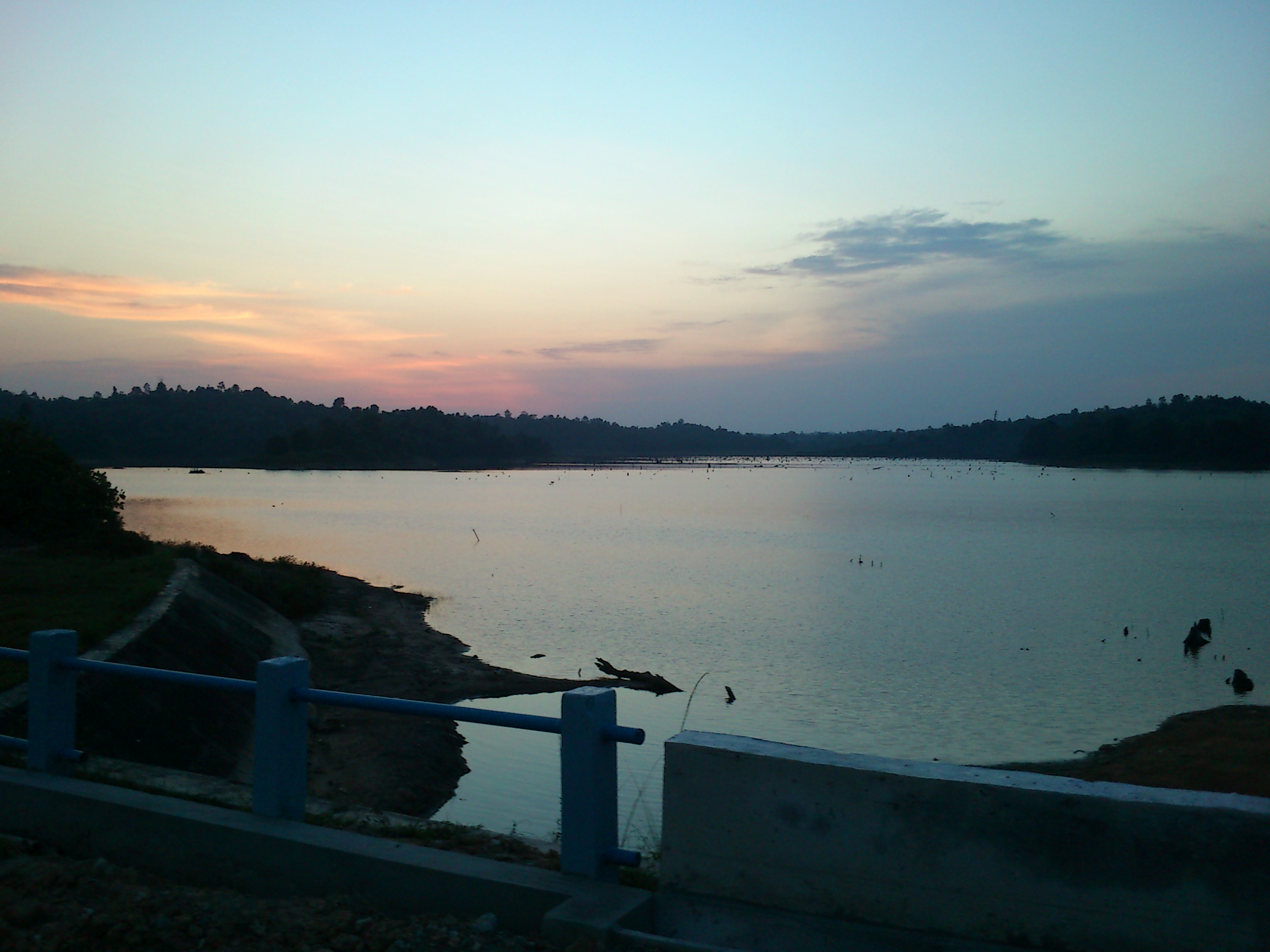
- Samboja Reservoir
- Interactive map of Samboja
- Location Samboja (Indonesia)
- Coordinates: 1°1′0.001″S 117°1′59.999″E
- Country: Indonesia
- Province: East Kalimantan
- Regency: Kutai Kartanegara
- District seat: Kampung Lama

Government
  - District head (Camat): Damsik

Area
  - Total: 284.93 km^{2} (110.01 sq mi)

Population (2023)
  - Total: 41,607
  - Density: 146.03/km^{2} (378.20/sq mi)
- Time zone: UTC+8 (ICT)
- Regional code: 64.02.13
- Villages: 13

Samboja (Indonesian pronunciation: [samˈbodʒa]) is a district in Kutai Kartanegara Regency, East Kalimantan, Indonesia. As of 2023, it was inhabited by 41,607 people, and has a total area of 284.93 km^{2} (110.01 sq mi). Its district seat is located at the village of Kampung Lama.

It borders West Samboja to the west and Muara Jawa to the north.

== Etymology ==
The etymology of this place name remains still unclear, there are two theories: from an existing male given name, or from a purported Chinese sentence sam bo cia "not eating in three days".

== History ==
The small town of Samboja was founded about a century ago in what was then rainforest when oil was discovered in the area. The first drilling began in 1897 near Balikpapan Bay. Dutch oil workers moved into the area to work for a company that was later taken over by Royal Dutch Shell and later still by the national Indonesian oil company Pertamina. The oil company began cutting wood in the 1950s and as people came flooding into the booming oil town of Balikpapan they cleared the surrounding forest. With the pronounced El Niño of 1982 and 1983 there were fires in the area, destroying the pockets of forest that remained.

From 24 April 1969, Samboja was divided into two by gubernatorial decree number 55/TH-Pem/SK/1969, of which parts north of the "Rawa III river" (2,947 km^{2}) were given to Samarinda, while parts south of it (726 km^{2}, i.e. the modern border between Balikpapan and Kutai Kartanegara) were given to Balikpapan. However, Samarinda returned the district to Kutai on 13 October 1987, while southern parts (such as the bordering village of Teritip) remain part of Balikpapan. Sanga-Sanga and Muara Jawa were likewise part of Samarinda at that time.

According to 2009 TED talk with Willie Smits (the founder of Samboja Lestari reserve), Samboja in 2002 was the poorest district of East Kalimantan, with 50% of the population unemployed and a high crime rate. Almost a quarter of average income went on buying drinking water. The land was covered with alang-alang grass (Imperata cylindrica), putting it at high risk for repeated forest and land fires. There were many nutrition and hygiene related health problems and life expectancy was low, with high infant and maternal mortality.

In 2019, Indonesian President Joko Widodo announced the relocation of Indonesia's capital from Jakarta to a yet to be developed city in East Kalimantan, which will span portions of Samboja. The initial plan proposed construction of the capital city start in 2021, but was postponed due to shifting government priorities mitigating the effects of the COVID-19 pandemic in Indonesia.

On 19 October 2020, the western parts of Samboja (containing 10 villages) were separated to form the new district of West Samboja, with its seat located at Tani Bhakti.

== Governance ==
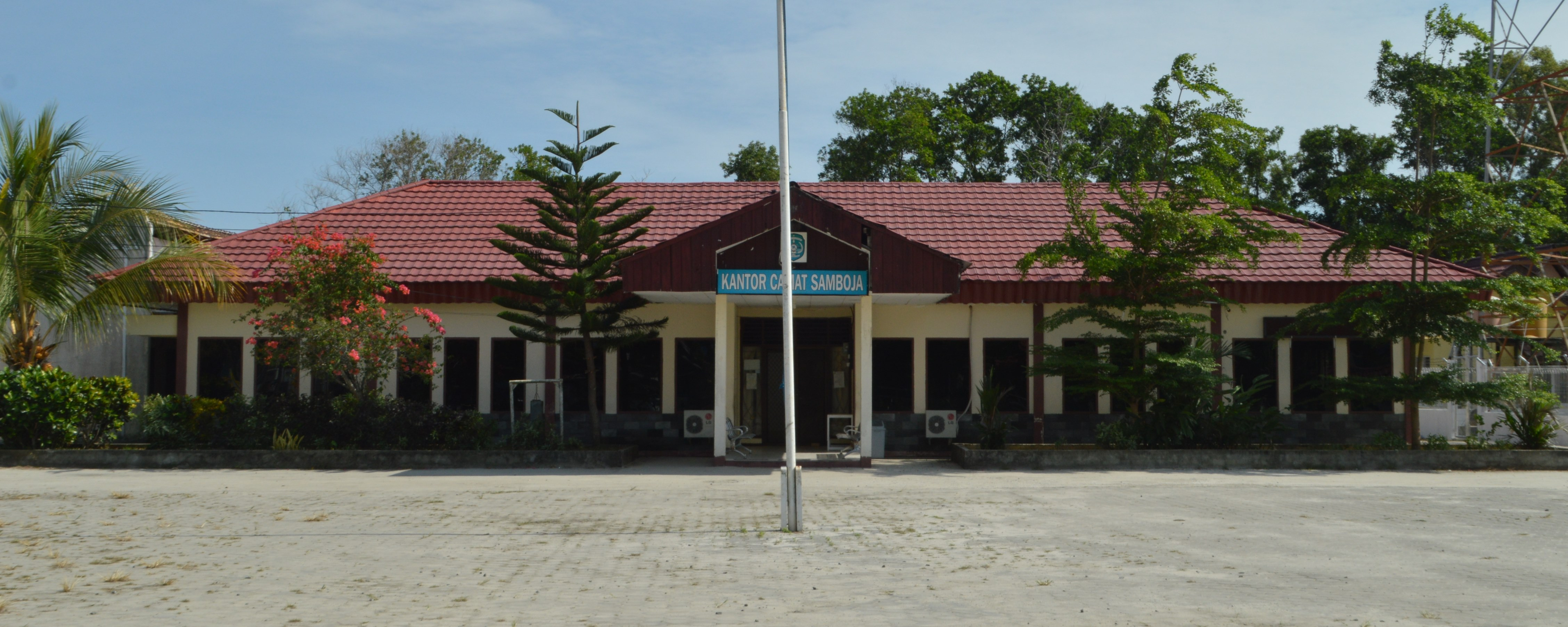
District head office at Samboja Kuala, Samboja.

=== Villages ===
Samboja is divided into the following 13 villages (the rest are urban kelurahan, rural desa are marked by grey background):

| Regional code (Kode wilayah) | Name | Area (km^{2}) | Population (2023) | RT (rukun tetangga) |
|---|---|---|---|---|
| 64.02.13.1007 | Sungai Seluang | 27.54 | 4,018 | 17 |
| 64.02.13.1008 | Wonotirto | 11.18 | 1,962 | 7 |
| 64.02.13.1009 | Tanjung Harapan | 22.05 | 2,343 | 11 |
| 64.02.13.1010 | Samboja Kuala | 15.33 | 6,806 | 14 |
| 64.02.13.1011 | Sanipah | 59.32 | 5,751 | 18 |
| 64.02.13.1012 | Handil Baru | 33.59 | 3,653 | 13 |
| 64.02.13.1013 | Muara Sembilang | 22.17 | 2,654 | 14 |
| 64.02.13.2014 | Karya Jaya | 10.05 | 1,670 | 10 |
| 64.02.13.2016 | Bukit Raya | 11.81 | 1,870 | 12 |
| 64.02.13.2019 | Beringin Agung | 15.07 | 2,107 | 10 |
| 64.02.13.1021 | Teluk Pemedas | 24.32 | 4,130 | 8 |
| 64.02.13.1022 | Kampung Lama | 10.54 | 2,286 | 8 |
| 64.02.13.1023 | Handil Baru Darat | 21.95 | 2,357 | 12 |
| | Totals | 284.93 | 41,607 | 286 |
