= Loa Janan =

District of Kutai Kartanegara Regency, East Kalimantan

- District
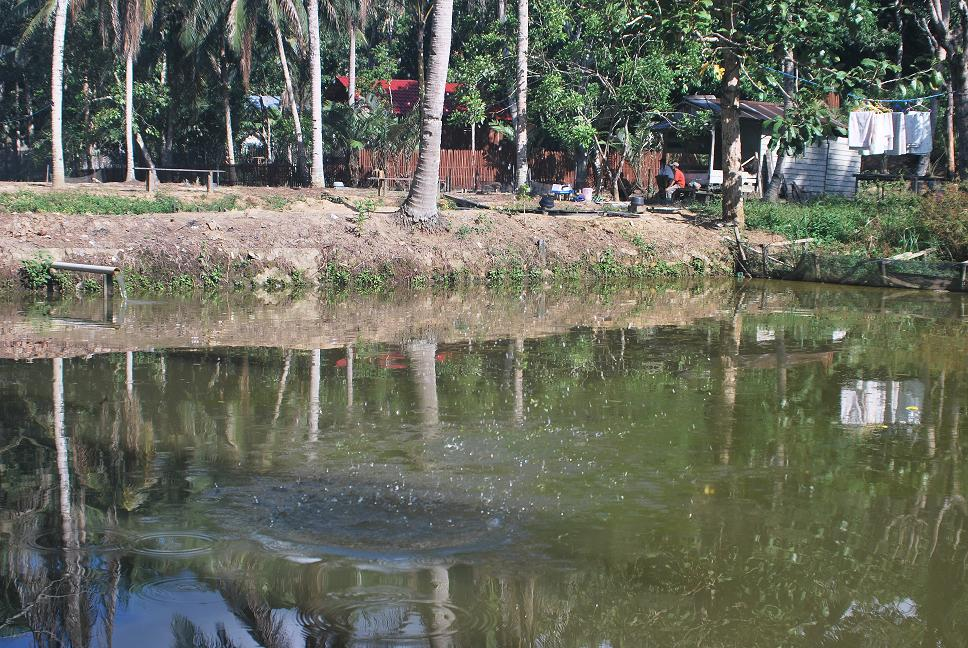
- Fishing pool at Purwajaya
- Interactive map of Loa Janan
- Location Loa Janan (Indonesia)
- Coordinates: 0°32′S 117°3′E
- Country: Indonesia
- Province: East Kalimantan
- Regency: Kutai Kartanegara
- District seat: Loa Janan Ulu

Government
  - District head (Camat): Heri Rusnadi

Area
  - Total: 644.20 km^{2} (248.73 sq mi)

Population (mid 2025 estimate)
  - Total: 79,365
  - Density: 123.20/km^{2} (319.08/sq mi)
- Time zone: UTC+8 (ICT)
- Regional code: 64.02.03
- Villages: 8

Loa Janan (Indonesian pronunciation: [ˈloa ˈdʒanan]) is an administrative district (kecamatan) in Kutai Kartanegara Regency, East Kalimantan Province of Indonesia. It covers a land area of 644.20 km^{2}, and had a population of 56,071 at the 2010 Census and 67,471 at the 2020 Census; the official estimate as at mid 2025 was 79,365. Its district seat is located at the village of Loa Janan Ulu.

Before 21 October 1987, the villages of Loa Buah, Loa Bakung, and Loa Janan Ilir were part of Loa Janan, but at that date these villages were transferred to the city of Samarinda. The former village of Loa Janan Ilir then later evolved into its own district within the city. There are claims that Loa Janan was originally part of Loa Kulu, nonetheless, much of the administrative history of East Kalimantan before 1969 remains unclear.

== Governance ==
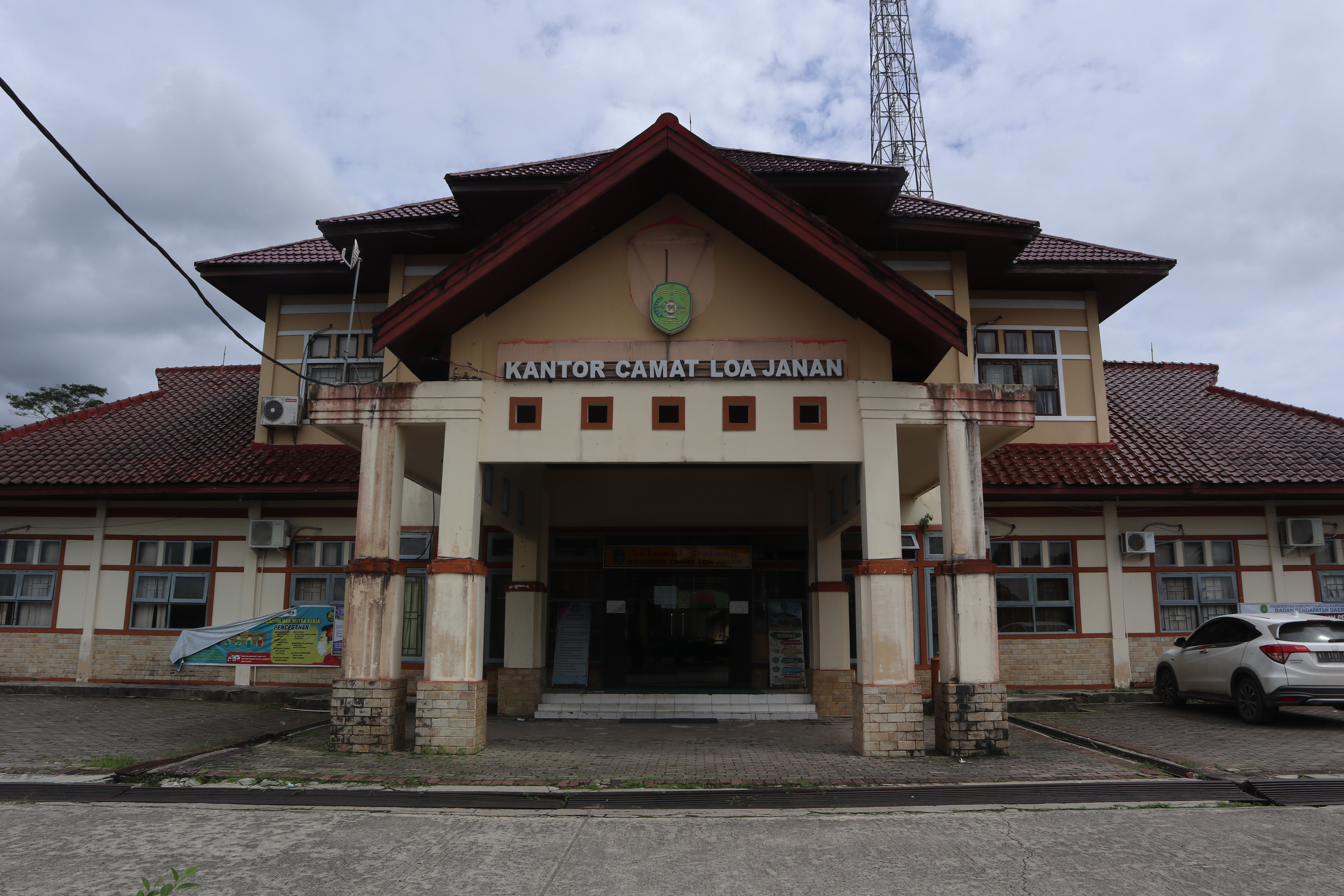
District head office at Loa Janan Ulu, Loa Janan.

=== Villages ===
Loa Janan is divided into the following eight villages (desa), listed below with their areas and their populations as at mid 2024.

Regional code (Kode wilayah)	Name	Area (km^{2})	Pop'n (2024)	Hamlets (dusun)	RT (rukun tetangga)
64.02.03.2001	Bakungan	208.33	10,525	10	49
64.02.03.2002	Loa Duri Ulu	127.28	10,912	3	14
64.02.03.2003	Loa Janan Ulu	11.90	12,916	6	21
64.02.03.2004	Purwajaya	35.55	5,496	5	36
64.02.03.2005	Tani Bakti	35.55	3,334	5	19
64.02.03.2006	Batuah	67.06	11,854	7	21
64.02.03.2007	Loa Duri Ilir	127.28	11,208	6	26
64.02.03.2008	Tani Harapan	31.25	2,925	4	14
	Totals	644.20	79,170	46	200
