= Samarinda Tunnel =

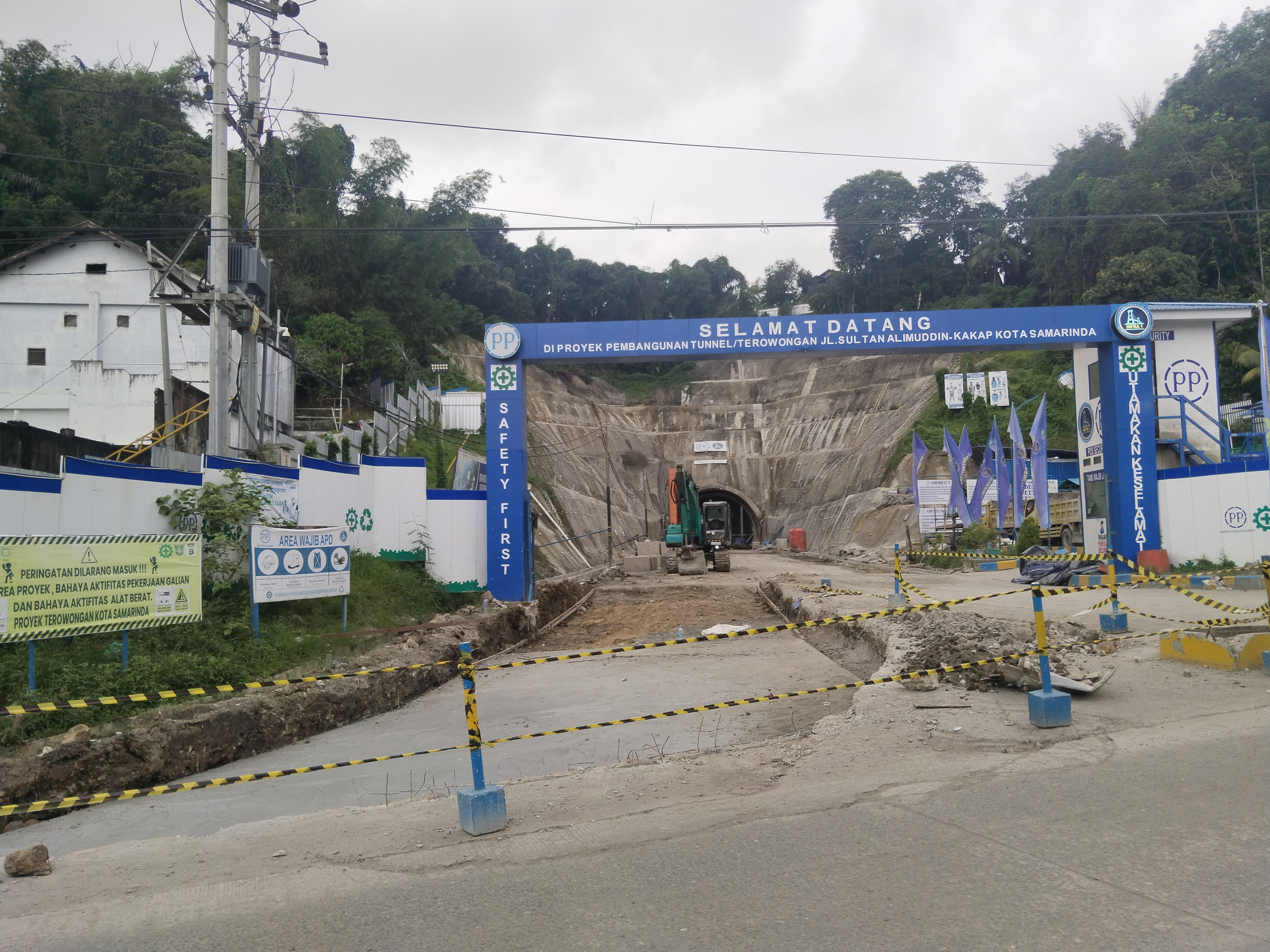
- Construction as of 5 March 2025
- Interactive map of Samarinda Tunnel

Overview
- Other name: Selili Tunnel
- Location: Samarinda, East Kalimantan, Indonesia
- Coordinates: 0.5077955°S 117.1630016°E
- Crosses: Mount Steleng
- Start: Kakap Road
- End: Sultan Alimuddin Road

Operation
- Work began: 20 January 2023

Technical
- Length: 690 m (2,260 ft)
- Tunnel clearance: 15 m (49 ft)
- Width: 15 m (49 ft)

Samarinda Tunnel (Indonesian: Terowongan Samarinda) or Selili Tunnel (Indonesian: Terowongan Selili), is a road tunnel construction project in Samarinda, East Kalimantan, Indonesia, connecting Sultan Alimuddin Road (Sambutan, Sambutan) and Kakap Road (Sungai Dama, Samarinda Ilir).

Dubbed as the first road tunnel in the island of Borneo, it has a length of 690 meters, with width and height each 15 meters. The construction of this tunnel uses new Austrian tunneling method (NATM) and it is currently being constructed by PP Construction & Investment.

== History ==
On 20 January 2023, a ground breaking attended by mayor of Samarinda Andi Harun, as well as other local officials, marked the start of tunnel's construction. Andi stated that the tunnel was intended to resolve traffic jams at Otto Iskandardinata Road, but also meant to connect Achmad Amins Bridge with the downtown of Samarinda. The work contract period lasts between 18 and 22 months, worth 395,792,799,000 rupiahs. In December 2024, the government of Samarinda additionally announced plans to widen Otto Iskandardinata Road, Sejati Road, and Sultan Alimuddin Road.

On 12 February 2025, vice president of Indonesia Gibran Rakabuming Raka together with his wife Selvi Ananda, visited Samarinda Tunnel, and his team distributed books and clothing to the crowds. At the moment, its construction progress had reached 86.3%. Also, Andi announced commissioning for the tunnel in May or June 2025. On 12 May 2025, following heavy rains, Samarinda Tunnel suffered a landfall right of its inlet at 09:30 p.m., leading to a conclusion that the tunnel is located at a talus deposit.
