= Samarinda =

Capital and largest city of East Kalimantan, Indonesia

- City
- City of Samarinda; Kota Samarinda
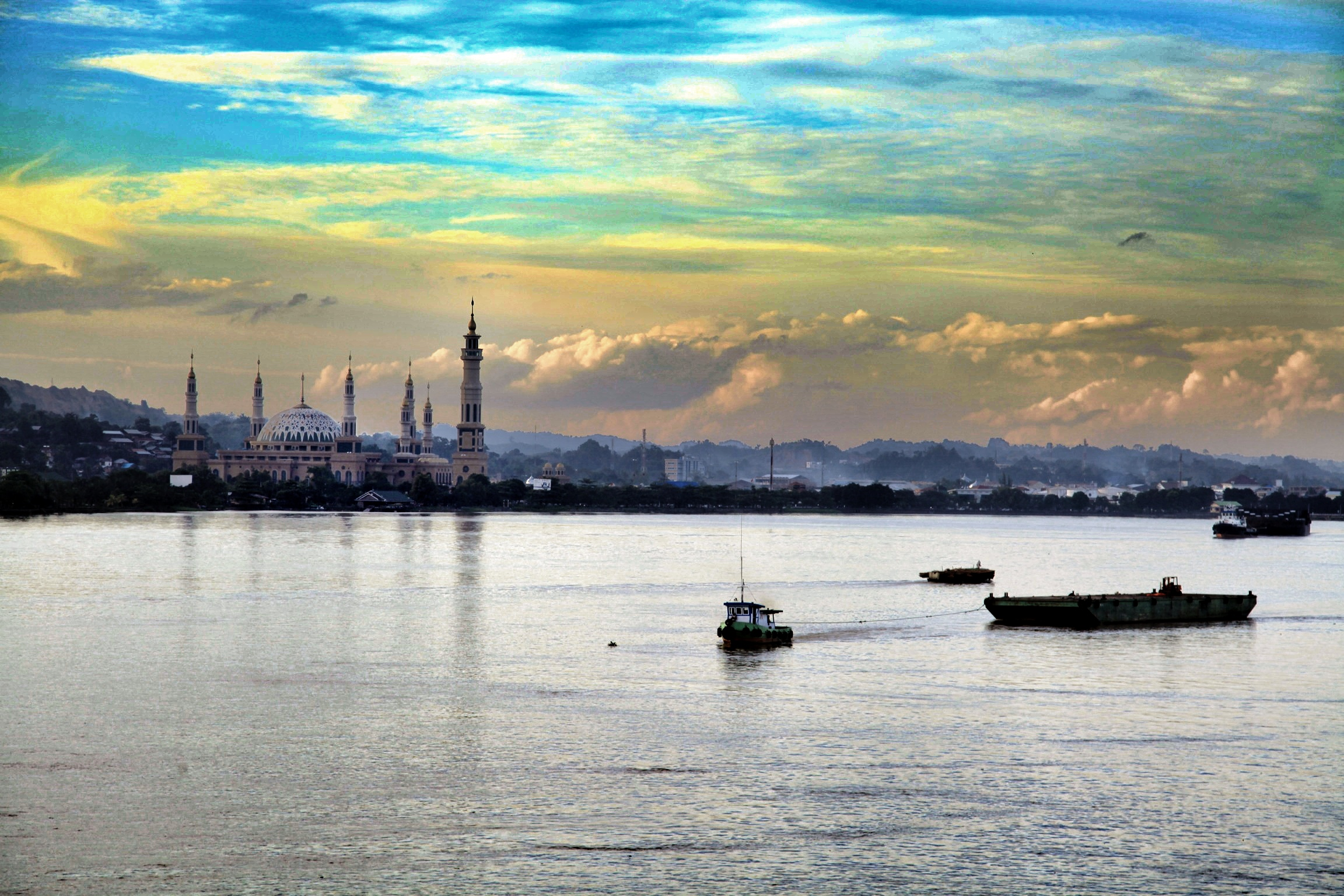
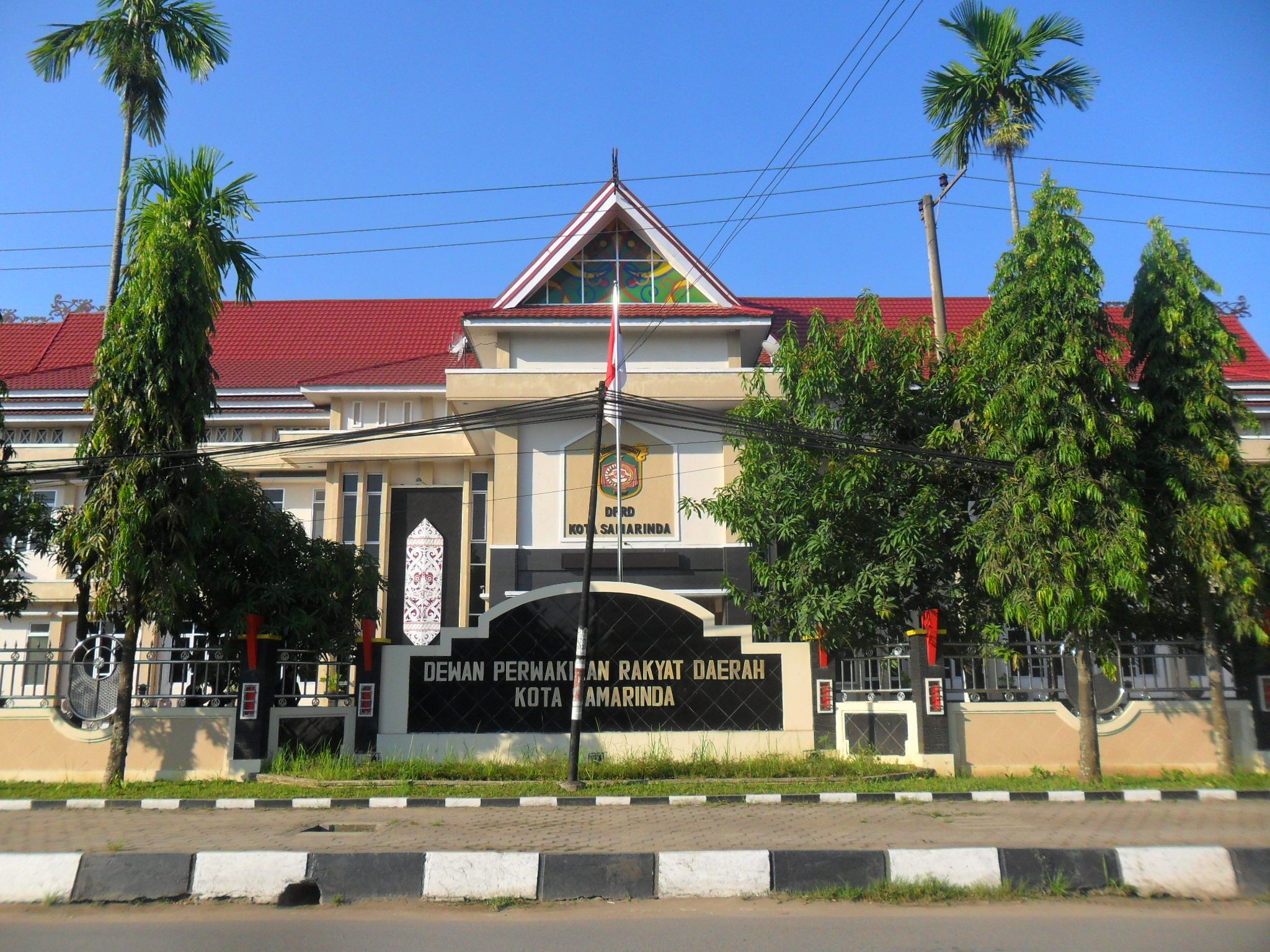
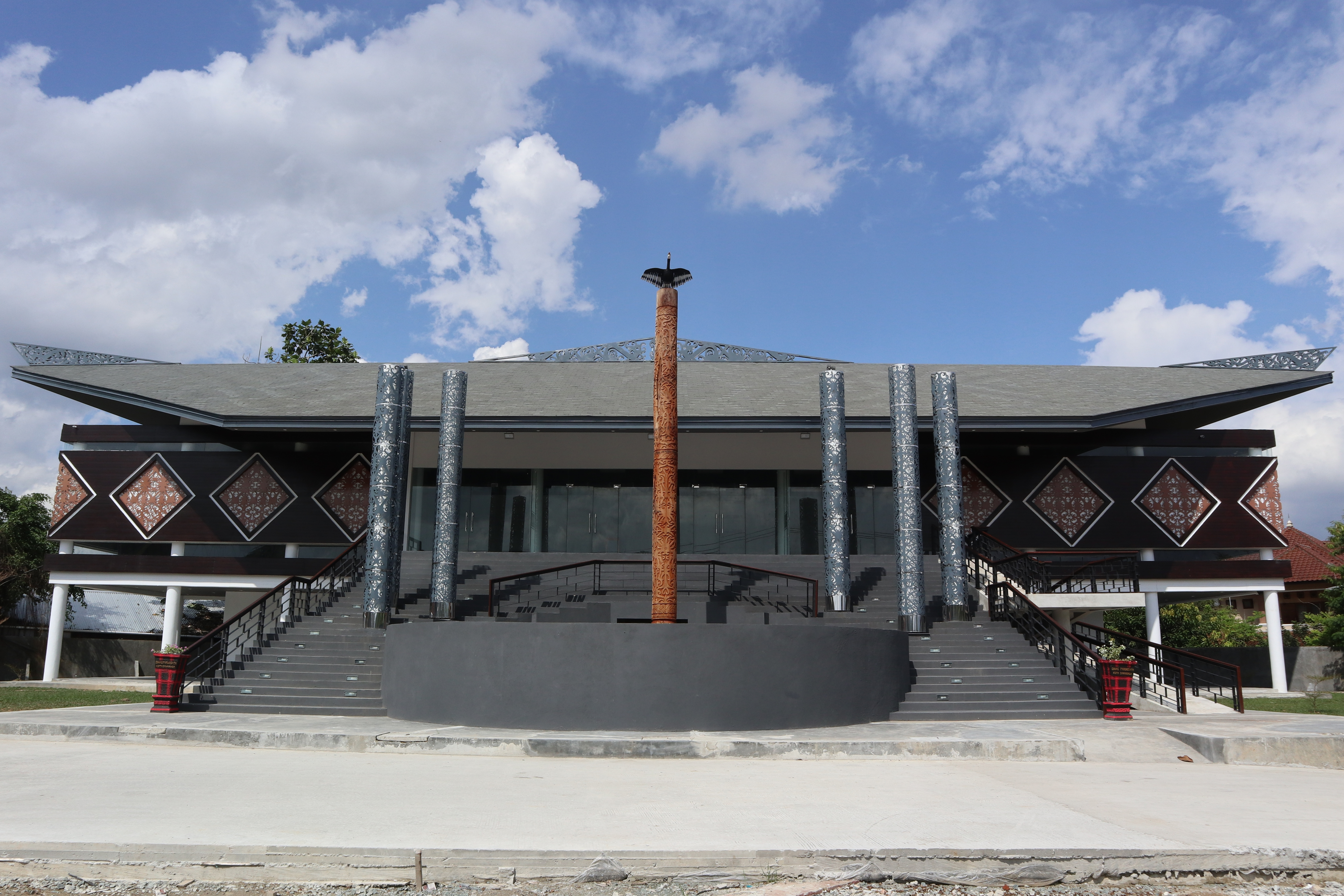
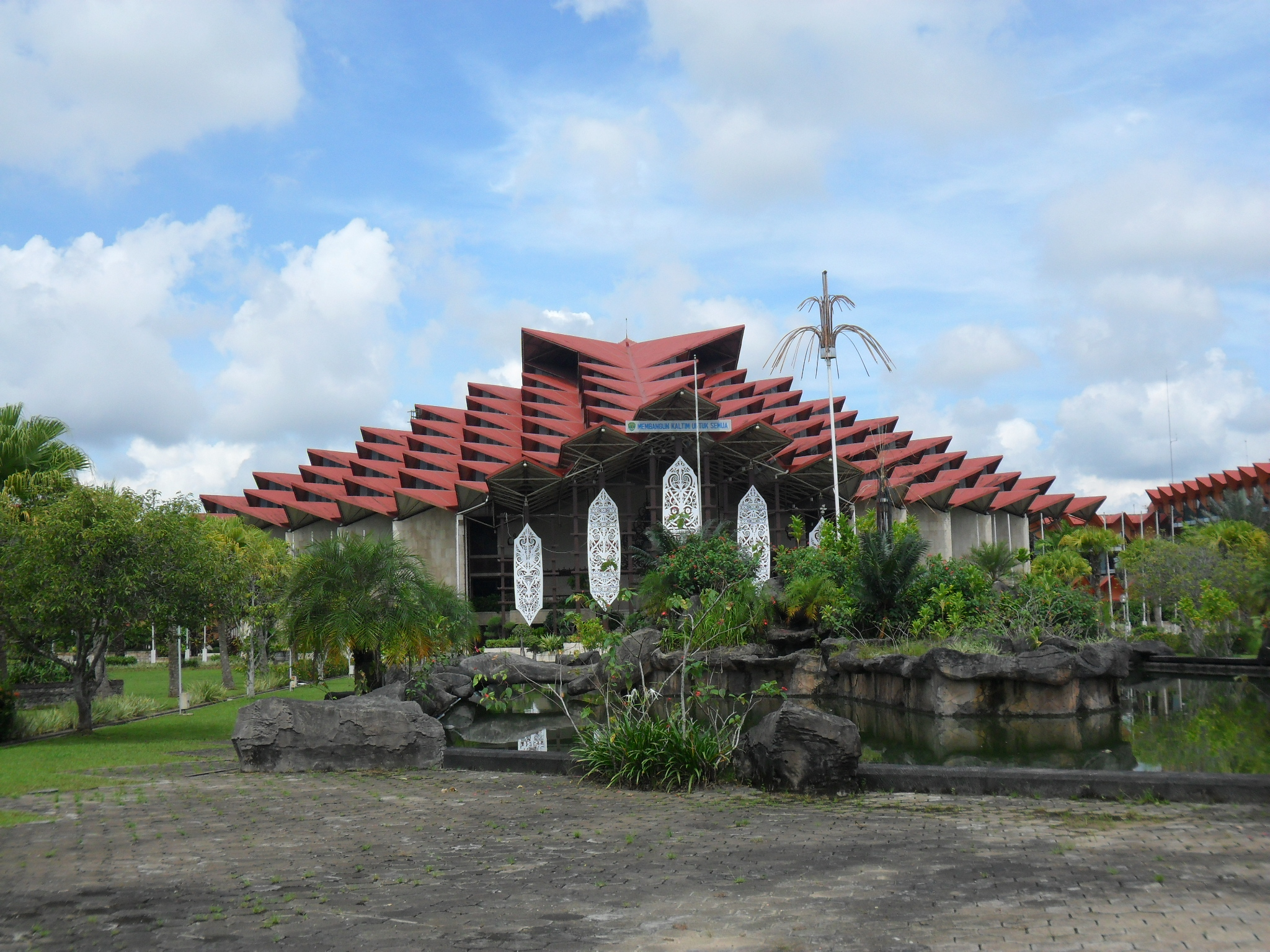
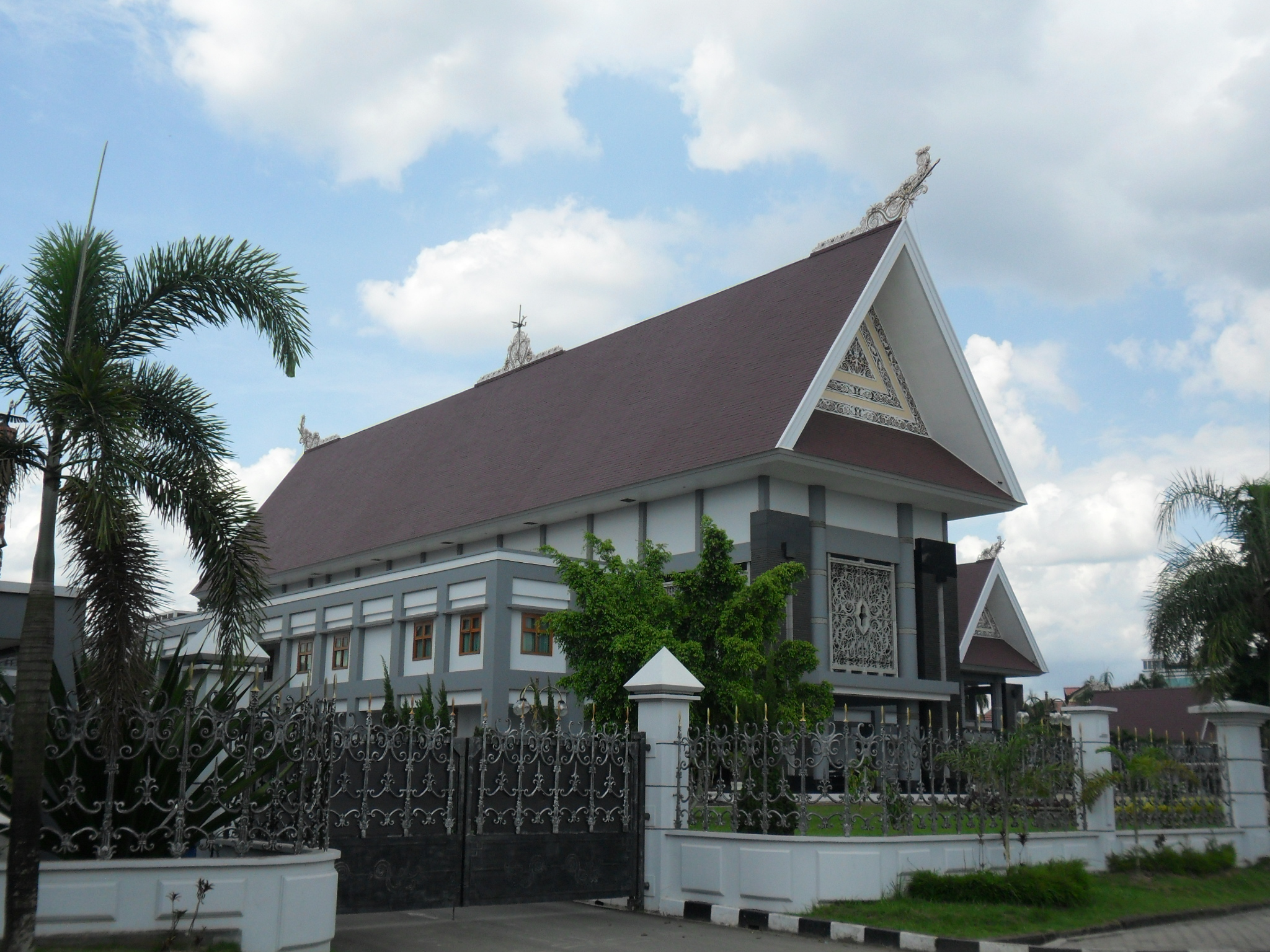
- Clockwise, from top: Samarinda Islamic Center Mosque seen from the Mahakam River, Samarinda Regional House of Representatives building, Samarinda Museum, East Kalimantan Regional House of Representatives building, East Kalimantan Governor Residence

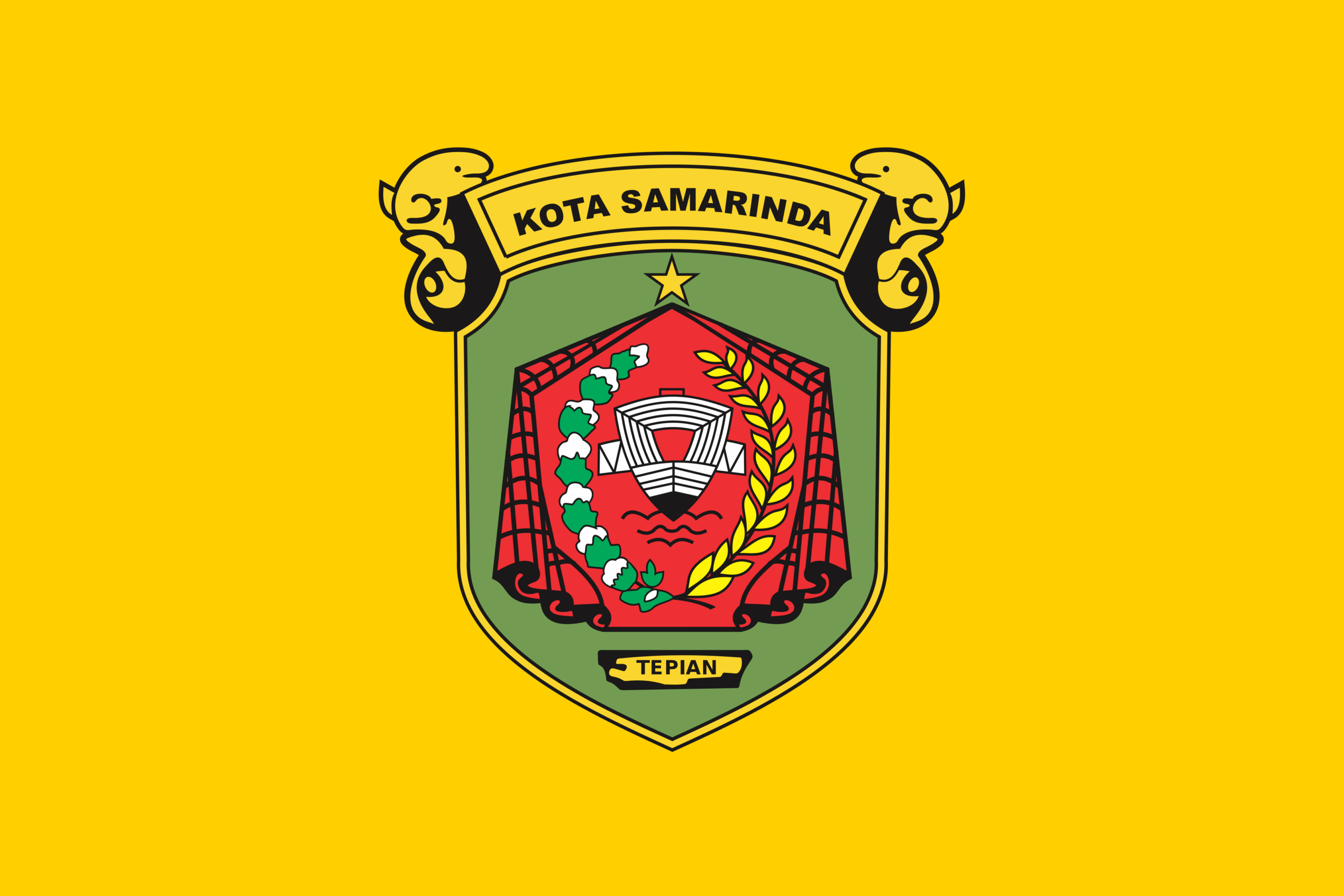
- Flag Coat of arms
- Motto(s): Samarinda Kota Tepian; Samarinda, the "City on the Coast"
- Location within East Kalimantan

- Location in Borneo
- Coordinates: 0°30′00″S 117°08′16″E
- Country: Indonesia
- Province: East Kalimantan
- Founded: 1668; 26 June 1959 (legal establishment date)

Government
  - Mayor: Andi Harun (Gerindra)
  - Vice Mayor: Saefuddin Zuhri
  - Legislature: Samarinda City Regional House of Representatives

Area
  - City: 718 km^{2} (277 sq mi)
  - Land: 691.53 km^{2} (267.00 sq mi)
  - Water: 26.47 km^{2} (10.22 sq mi) 3.65%
  - Rank: 7th (Indonesia)
- Highest elevation (Puncak Samarinda): 260 m (850 ft)
- Lowest elevation (Mahakam River): 0 m (0 ft)

Population (mid 2025 estimate)
  - City: 865,306
  - Rank: 1st (Borneo)
  - Density: 1,251.3/km^{2} (3,240.8/sq mi)
  - Metro: 1,050,000
- Demonym: Samarindan
- Time zone: UTC+08:00 (WITA)
- Postal code: 75000
- Area code: +62541
- Administrative centre: Bugis
- Largest district by population: Samarinda Ulu
- Date format: dd-mm-yyyy
- Drives on the: left
- HDI (2022): ▲0.814 (very high)

Samarinda (Indonesian pronunciation: [samaˈrɪnda]) is the capital city of the Indonesian province of East Kalimantan. It is situated on the riverbanks of lower Mahakam, and both parts are connected by Mahakam Bridge, Mahakam Ulu Bridge, and Achmad Amins Bridge. It holds title of the seventh largest Indonesian city by area, with a total area of around 718 km^{2} (277 sq mi). Samarinda is also the most populous city on the entire island of Borneo, with population estimates of 727,500 (2010 Census); 827,994 (2020 Census); and 865,306 (mid 2025). As of 2026, it is divided into 10 districts and further into 59 urban villages (kelurahan).

Samarinda was formally established as a city on 26 June 1959, after being separated from the outgoing Special Region of Kutai, a second-level administrative division similar to a regency that was ruled by the eponymous sultanate. Before becoming the capital city of East Kalimantan, it was the seat of Special Region of Kutai during its early years until it was moved into Tenggarong in 1956. Before the annexations of 1987, the districts of Sanga-Sanga, Muara Jawa, and Samboja comprised a significant portion of the city's territory. Today, Samarinda is an enclave surrounded by different districts belonging to the Kutai Kartanegara Regency: (in clockwise direction from the north) Tenggarong Seberang, Muara Badak, Anggana, Sanga-Sanga, Muara Jawa, Loa Janan, and Loa Kulu.

Samarinda was one of Indonesia's top ten Most Liveable Cities in 2022, ranks first on East Kalimantan Human Development Index Samarinda is East Kalimantan's largest exporter and fifth-largest importer. The city has the highest number of bank headquarters in East Kalimantan. In 2021, Samarinda Harbour became the busiest passenger port in East Kalimantan. The container port in Samarinda is also the busiest in East Kalimantan, handled more than 271 thousand twenty-foot equivalent units (TEU) in 2019. Samarinda is known for its traditional food amplang, as well as the cloth sarung samarinda.

== Etymology ==
The name Samarinda originates from the description of the way in which the Bugis houses were constructed. At that time houses were customarily built on a raft and generally had the same height. This provided important social symbolism of equality between residents; no person's house, and thus no person, was seen as higher or lower than another. They named the settlement “Samarenda”, meaning “equally low”. After hundreds of years of use the pronunciation of the name changed slightly and the city became known as Samarinda.

== History ==
Samarinda, which nowadays has been known as a city, was a part of the Sultanate of Kutai. In the 13th century CE, before it was known as Samarinda, there had been settlements in six locations, namely Pulau Atas, Karang Asan (Karang Asam), Karamumus (Karang Mumus), Luah Bakung (Loa Bakung), Sembuyutan (Sambutan), and Mangkupelas (Mangkupalas). (Note: Loa Bakung, Pulau Atas, and Sambutan administratively did not become part of Samarinda until their annexation into the city in 1987.) The mentioning of 6 villages above was found at a manuscript of Surat Salasilah Raja dalam Negeri Kutai Kertanegara written by Khatib Muhammad Tahir in 30 Rabi' al-Awwal AH 1265 (24 February 1849).

At the start of the Gowa War, the Dutch under Admiral Speelman's command attacked Makassar from the sea. Meanwhile, the Netherlands' Bugis ally Arung Palakka led a ground attack. The Kingdom of Gowa was forced to surrender and Sultan Hasanuddin was made to sign the Treaty of Bongaja on 19 November 1667.

The treaty did not quell all trouble for the Dutch however, since the Bugis from Gowa continued their struggle using guerilla tactics. Some Buginese moved to other islands close by such as Kalimantan. A few thousand people led by Lamohang Daeng Mangkona or Pua Ado I, moved to East Kalimantan, known then as Kutai, where they were welcomed by the local Sultan.

Samarinda was a small, sleepy town in 1942 with several small oil fields in the vicinity. It was occupied by the Japanese after the Dutch East Indies had fallen.

In 1955, the Apostolic Vicariate of Samarinda was established in the city. In 1961, it was promoted as the Diocese of Samarinda. In 2003, the diocese was promoted as the Metropolitan Archdiocese of Samarinda.

== Administrative districts ==
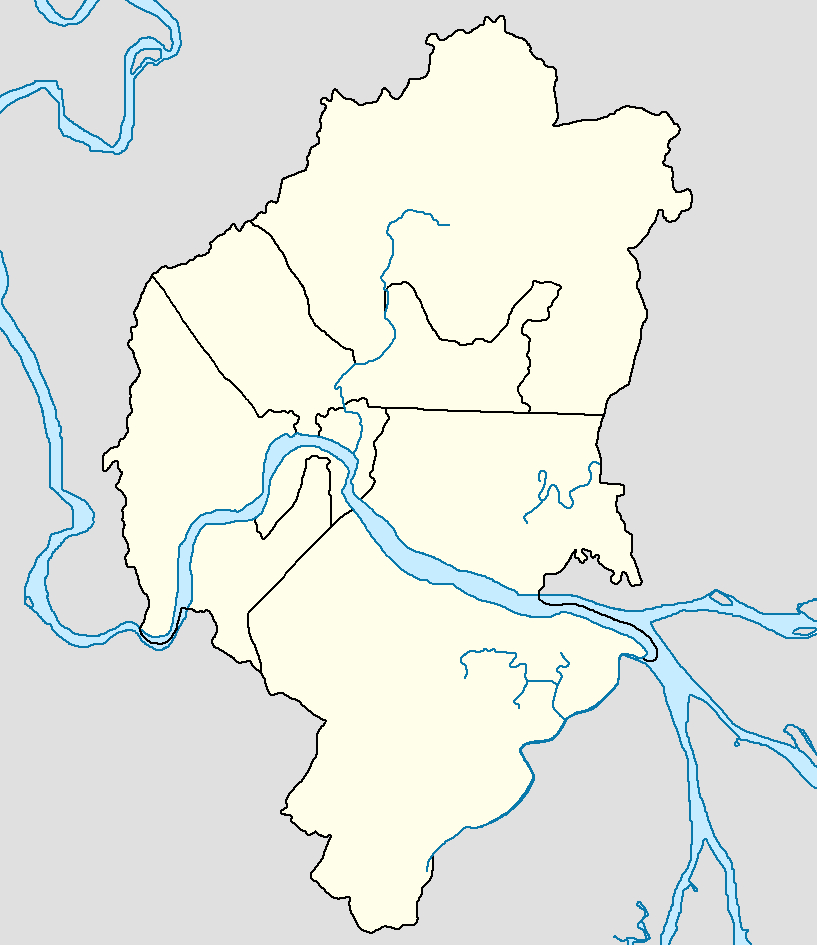
Present map of districts in Samarinda

At the time of the 2010 Census, Samarinda City was divided into six districts (Indonesian: kecamatan), but four additional districts were subsequently created by splitting of existing ones. The ten districts are tabulated below with their areas and their populations at the 2010 Census and the 2020 Census, together with the official estimates as of mid-2025. The table also includes the number of urban villages in each district (all classed as urban kelurahan) and their post codes.

Regional code	District name	Area (km^{2})	Population			Administrative centre	Most populous village	Number of villages	Post code(s)
Regional code	District name	Area (km^{2})	2010	2020	2025	Administrative centre	Most populous village	Urban	Post code(s)
64.72.01	Palaran	221.29	49,079	63,189	69,934	Rawa Makmur		5	75241 – 75253
64.72.02	Samarinda Seberang	12.49	114,183	64,050	66,817	Baqa	Sungai Keledang	6	75131 – 75133
64.72.03	Samarinda Ulu (Upper Samarinda)	22.12	126,651	129,806	142,533	Air Putih		8	75122 – 75128
64.72.04	Samarinda Ilir (Lower Samarinda)	17.18	120,936	69,142	69,421	Sidomulyo		5	75114 – 75117
64.72.05	North Samarinda (Samarinda Utara)	229.52	202,607	106,743	106,949	Lempake	North Sempaja	8	75117 – 75119
64.72.06	Sungai Kunjang	43.04	114,044	133,543	141,167	Loa Bakung	Lok Bahu	7	75125 – 75127
64.72.07	Sambutan	100.95	^{(a)}	57,941	58,061	Sambutan		5	75114, 75115
64.72.08	Sungai Pinang	34.16	^{(c)}	105,970	106,339	Sungai Pinang Dalam		5	76117 – 76119
64.72.09	Samarinda Kota (Samarinda town)	11.12	^{(a)}	31,719	35,426	Sungai Pinang Luar		5	7511 – 75113, 75117, 75121
64.72.10	Loa Janan Ilir	26.13	^{(b)}	65,892	68,659	Simpang Tiga	Rapak Dalam	5	75131
Totals		718.00	727,500	827,994	865,306	Bugis (de facto)	Sungai Pinang Dalam	59	

Notes: (a) the 2010 populations of Samarinda Kota and Sambutan Districts are included in the 2010 figure for Samarinda Ilir District, from which they were later split off. (b) the 2010 population of Loa Janan Ilir District is included in the figure for Samarinda Seberang District, from which it was later split off. (c) the 2010 population of Sungai Pinang District is included in the figure for Samarinda Utara District, from which it was later split off.

=== Territorial evolution ===
During its early days after its formation in 1960, Samarinda initially only consisted of 2 districts, namely Samarinda Kota (not to be confused with the current district that was formed in 2010) and Samarinda Seberang (both comprised a total area of 167 km^{2}, and each located north and south of the Mahakam). Then, Samarinda Kota was bifurcated into Samarinda Ilir and Samarinda Ulu (date unknown), both of them still exist to this day. Samarinda Seberang also became the oldest existing district in the city, following its legal establishment in 1923. On 24 April 1969, months following the approval of Governor of East Kalimantan Decree No. 18/TH-Pem/1969 on 2 February 1969, the districts of Palaran (first known separation from Anggana), Sanga-Sanga, Muara Jawa and Samboja were transferred from Kutai Regency to Samarinda, therefore, its total area increased to around 2,727 km^{2}. This move was related to the enormous size of Kutai Regency at the time, causing ineffectivity in public service, as well as the closer proximity of four districts with Samarinda rather than with Tenggarong, the capital city of Kutai. The districts were also home to several major companies active in oil and gas sector, and it was hoped to bring that revenue into Samarinda's government.

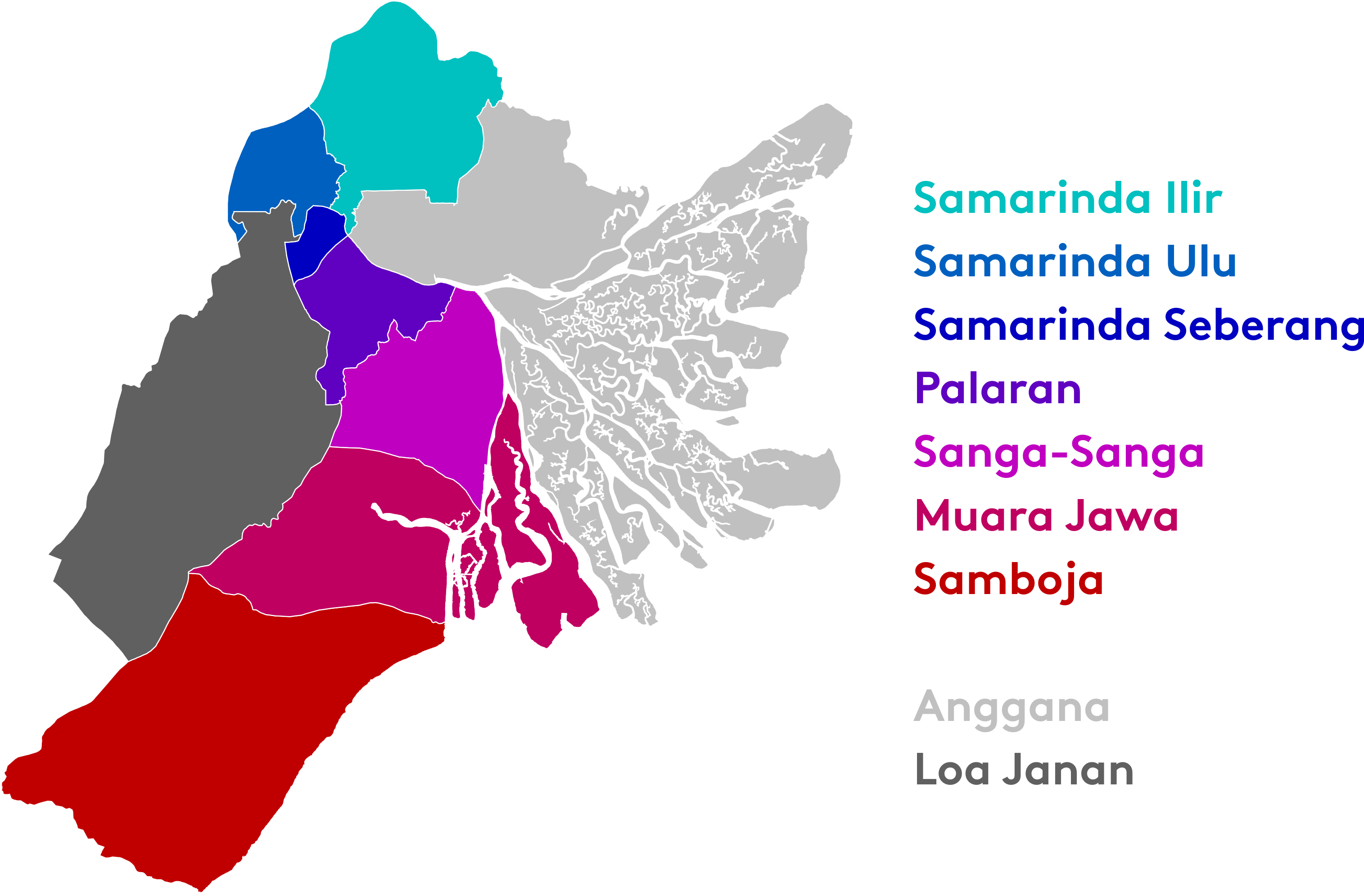
Map of Samarinda together with the neighbouring district Anggana and Loa Janan, between 1969 and 1987

However, the previous annexations of 1969 instead brought reverse effects into both Samarinda and Balikpapan, as only below 5% of their total areas were usable, while being inhabited by less than 300,000 people at the time. The cities made multiple negotiations in 1985 with the governments of Kutai and Pasir regencies, respectively, in order to alter each other's boundaries. It culminated on significant reduction of the cities' territories on 13 October 1987, where Sanga-Sanga, Muara Jawa, and Samboja were separated from Samarinda and soon attached to Kutai (Palaran remains part of the city). In exchange, Samarinda received 6 villages from neighbouring few districts of Kutai Regency, namely Bantuas (from Sanga-Sanga, attached to Palaran); Loa Buah and Loa Bakung (from Loa Janan, attached to Samarinda Ulu); Loa Janan Ilir (from Loa Janan, attached to Samarinda Seberang); Sungai Kapih, Sambutan, and Pulau Atas (from Anggana, attached to Samarinda Ilir).

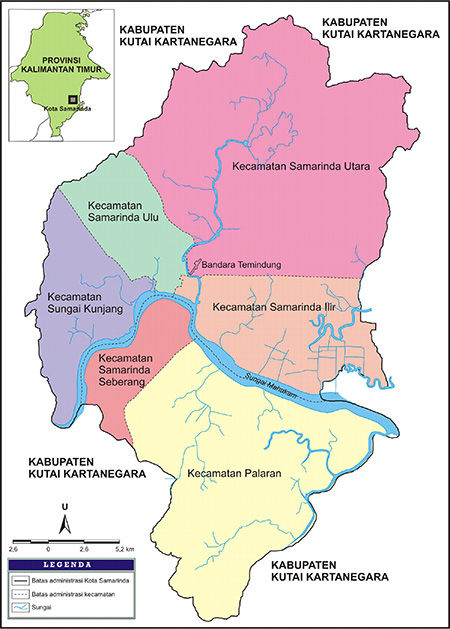
Map of Samarinda between 1996 and 2010

On 11 June 1996, under Government Regulation Number 38 of 1996, the districts of Sungai Kunjang and North Samarinda were created from parts of Samarinda Ulu and Samarinda Ilir, respectively. Four years forward on 23 February 2001, the remaining rural villages (desa) of Sambutan, Sindang Sari, Makroman, Pulau Atas, Sungai Kapih, Loa Buah, and Simpang Pasir changed their statuses into urban counterparts (kelurahan). On 22 February 2006, new 11 urban villages were created from existing ones: Sengkotek and Tani Aman (from Loa Janan Ilir, then renamed as Simpang Tiga), Rapak Dalam (from Baqa), Tanah Merah (from Lempake), Bandara (from Pelita), Gunung Lingai (from Temindung Permai), North Sempaja (from Sempaja, then renamed as South Sempaja), Mugirejo (from Sungai Pinang Dalam), Bukit Pinang (from Air Putih), Karang Asam Ilir (from Karang Asam, then renamed as Karang Asam Ulu), and Karang Anyar (from Teluk Lerong Ulu).

On 14 December 2010, four new districts were created in Samarinda, namely Samarinda Kota (from Samarinda Ulu and Samarinda Ilir), Sambutan (from Samarinda Ilir), Sungai Pinang (from North Samarinda), and Loa Janan Ilir (from Samarinda Seberang). As a result, the administrative capitals of Samarinda Ilir and North Samarinda were relocated from Sambutan and Sungai Pinang Dalam villages to Sidomulyo and Lempake, respectively. The latest creation of new villages occurred on 12 August 2014, resulting on Mangkupalas and Tenun (from Mesjid), Gunung Panjang (from Sungai Keledang), West Sempaja and East Sempaja (from South Sempaja), and Budaya Pampang (from Sungai Siring). Since 2025, there have been ongoing proposals to create the new villages of South Sungai Pinang and North Sungai Pinang from existing Sungai Pinang Dalam (this would also increase the number of villages in Samarinda from 59 to 61).

== Geography ==
=== Climate ===
Samarinda has a tropical rainforest climate (Köppen: Af) with heavy rainfall and hot, oppressively humid temperatures year-round. Hail is extremely rare, it was recorded on 21 November 2019. The lowest recorded temperature in Samarinda is 18.0 °C (64.4 °F) in October 1982, while the highest recorded is 40.2 °C (104 °F) on 8 February 2008.

Climate data for Samarinda (Temindung Airport) (1991–2020 normals)
Month	Jan	Feb	Mar	Apr	May	Jun	Jul	Aug	Sep	Oct	Nov	Dec	Year
Mean daily maximum °C (°F)	32.3 (90.1)	32.6 (90.7)	32.8 (91.0)	32.6 (90.7)	32.4 (90.3)	31.8 (89.2)	31.6 (88.9)	32.2 (90.0)	32.5 (90.5)	32.7 (90.9)	32.5 (90.5)	32.5 (90.5)	32.4 (90.3)
Daily mean °C (°F)	28.5 (83.3)	28.4 (83.1)	28.9 (84.0)	28.5 (83.3)	28.5 (83.3)	28.0 (82.4)	27.6 (81.7)	27.9 (82.2)	28.3 (82.9)	28.8 (83.8)	28.7 (83.7)	28.5 (83.3)	28.4 (83.1)
Mean daily minimum °C (°F)	24.1 (75.4)	24.2 (75.6)	24.6 (76.3)	24.2 (75.6)	24.4 (75.9)	24.1 (75.4)	23.7 (74.7)	23.6 (74.5)	23.9 (75.0)	24.5 (76.1)	24.4 (75.9)	24.1 (75.4)	24.2 (75.5)
Average precipitation mm (inches)	166 (6.5)	173 (6.8)	202 (8.0)	236 (9.3)	181 (7.1)	168 (6.6)	160 (6.3)	148 (5.8)	118 (4.6)	145 (5.7)	196 (7.7)	209 (8.2)	2,102 (82.6)
Source 1: Starlings Roost Weather
Source 2:

== Demographics ==
The territory's population in mid 2024 was 868,499, with an annual growth rate of 0.77% in 2023–2024. The majority of the people of Samarinda are of Native Indonesian and Chinese descent with a small minority of Arabs. There are also Americans, Canadians, Europeans, Japanese, Filipinos and Koreans working in Samarinda. Life expectancy in Samarinda was 73.6 years as of 2014.

	Nationality / Origin	2019 (pre-pandemic)	2019%	2020
1	Asia	473	47.2%	315
2	Europe	172	17.1%	5
3	ASEAN	168	16.7%	126
4	Oceania	163	16.3%	15
5	America	23	2.3%	19
6	Africa	4	0.4%	12
	Total	1,003	100.0%	
As of 31 December 2020; Source: Samarinda Statistics Department

=== Religion ===
Samarinda's main religions are Islam and Christianity. The Muslim community forms the majority of the population numbering around 91%. The Christian community numbers at nearly 66,000 individuals or slightly over 7% of the total population; Protestants form a larger number than Roman Catholics at a rate of 10:3. There are also small Buddhist, Hindu and other religious communities.

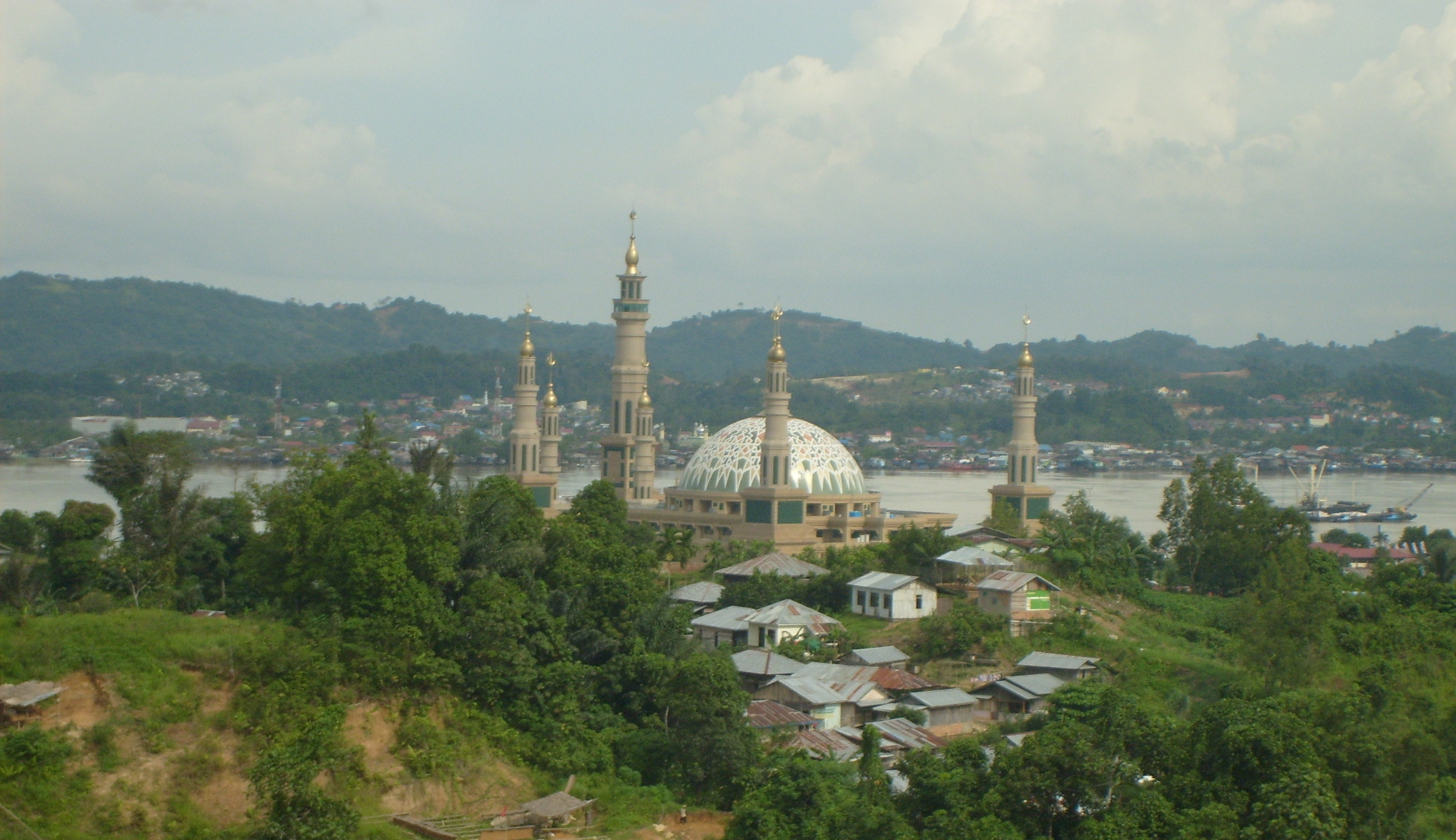
Baitul Muttaqien Mosque

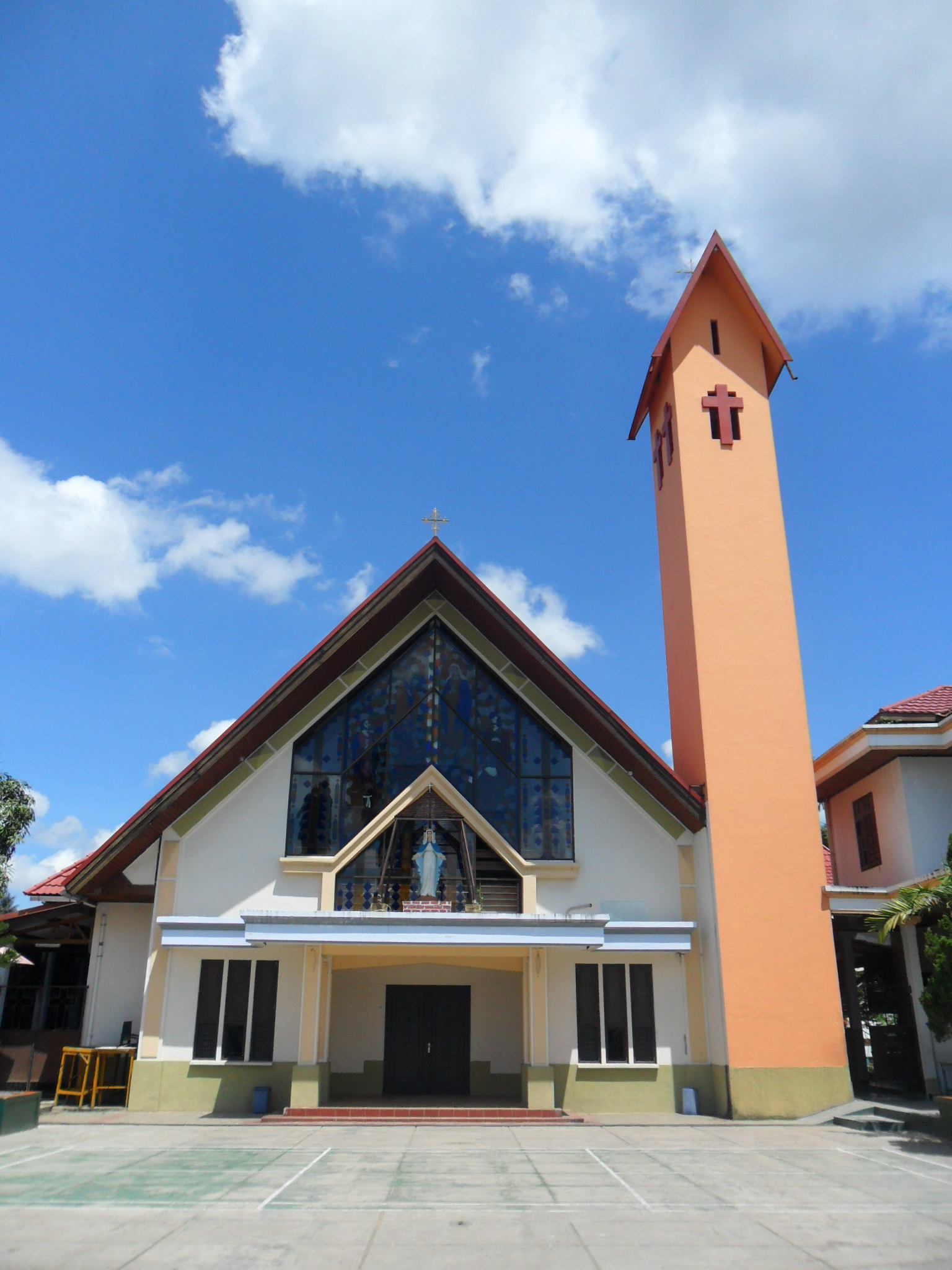
Cathedral of Saint Mary

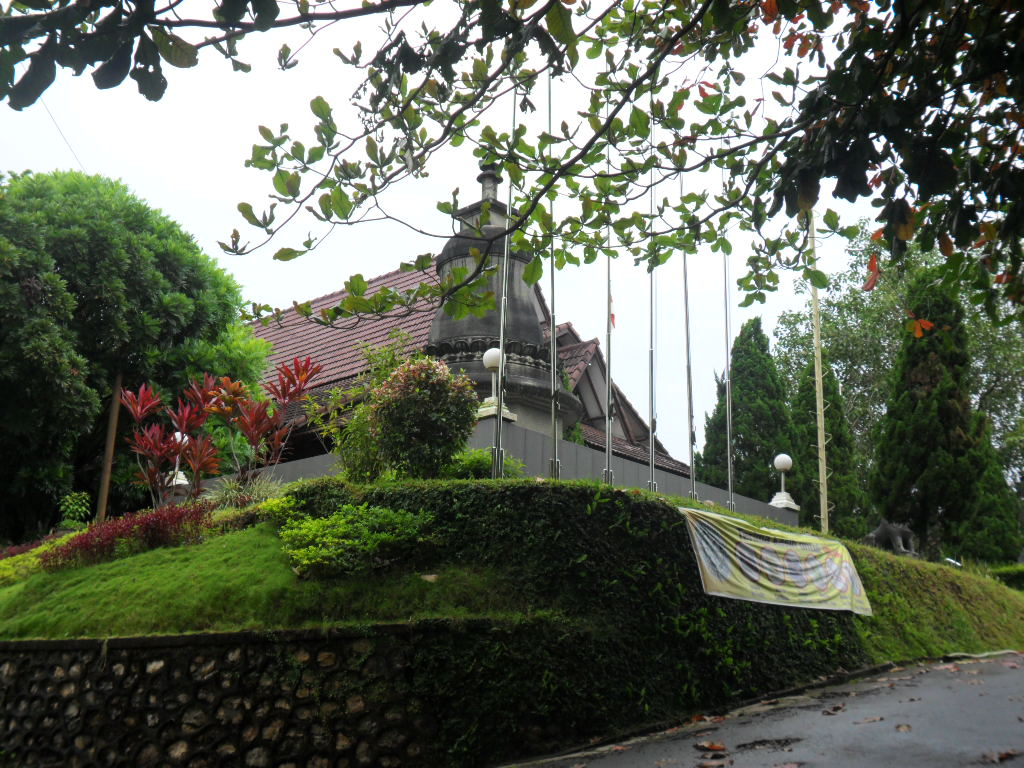
Muladharma Buddhist temple

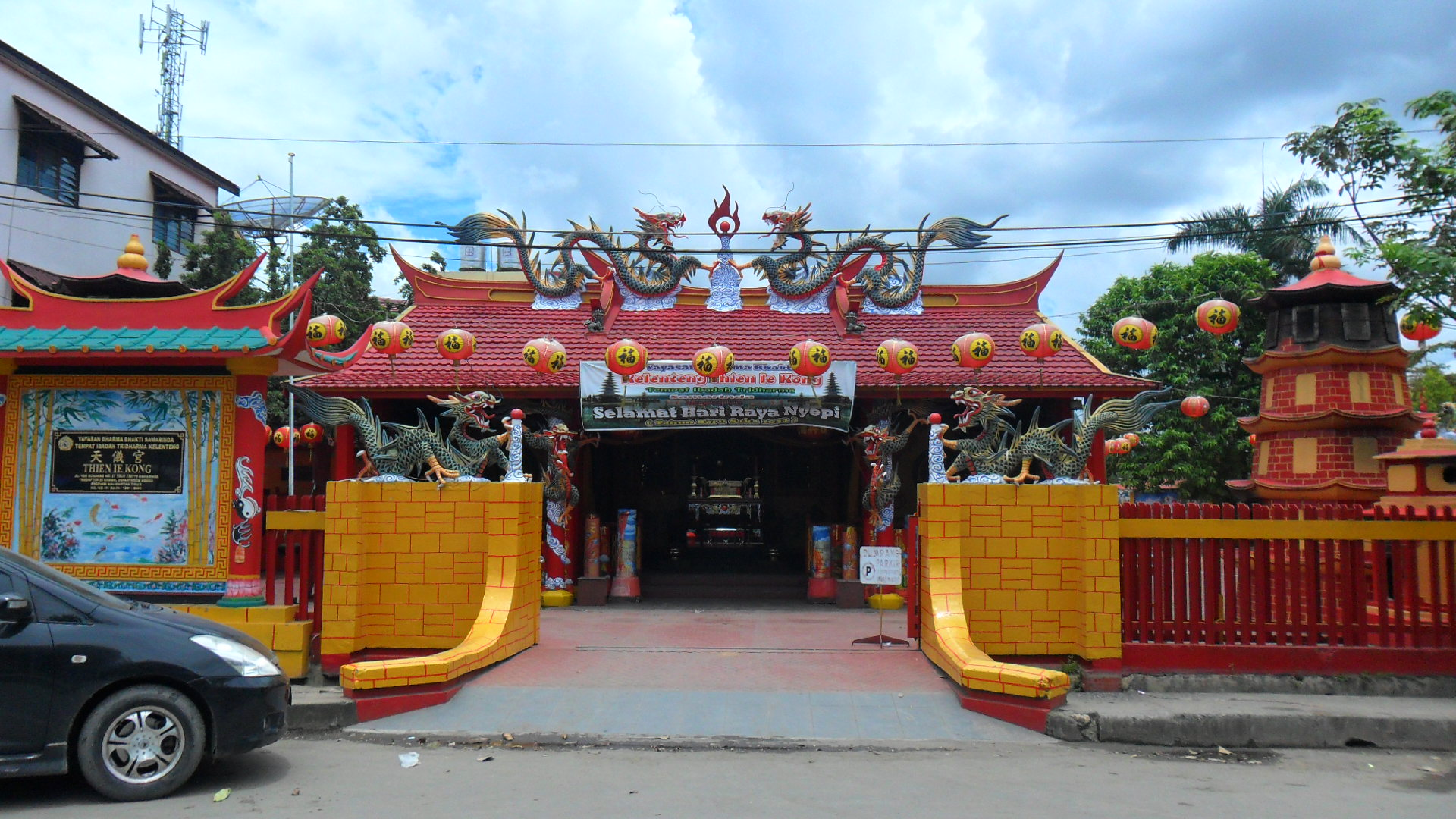
Thien Ie Kong temple

=== Samarinda Metropolitan Area ===
The urban area surrounding the city contains many suburban communities, particularly in the neighbouring districts (kecamatan) of Loa Kulu, Loa Janan, Muara Jawa, Sanga Sanga, Anggana and Muara Badak (all part of Kutai Kartanegara Regency). Together with the city's own residents, they constitute an urban area of over 1,050,000 inhabitants.

== Education ==
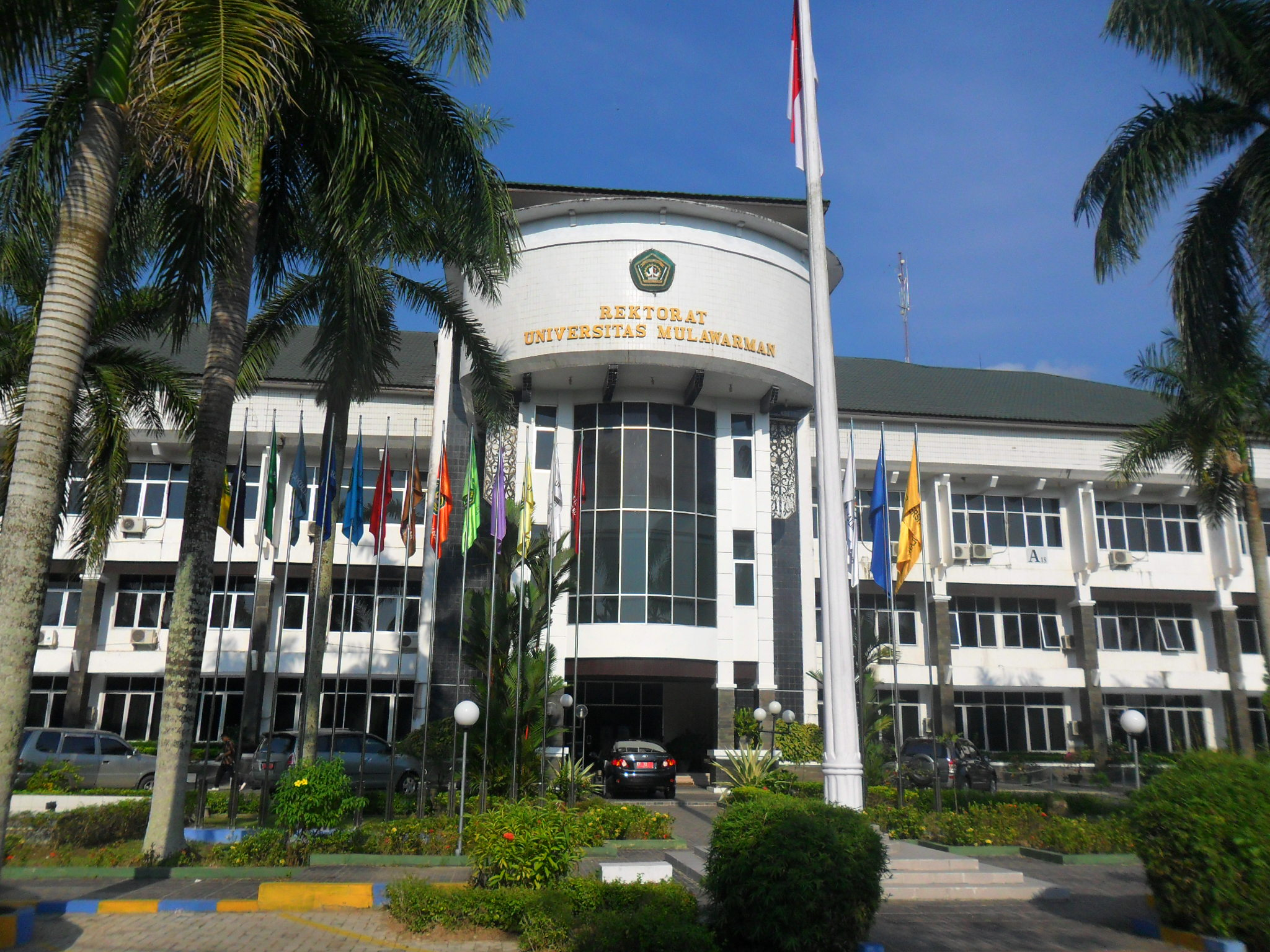
Rectorate Building of Mulawarman University

Around 2010/2011, Samarinda has 252 elementary schools, 129 junior high schools, 54 senior high school, 53 vocational schools, and 27 colleges.

== Healthcare ==
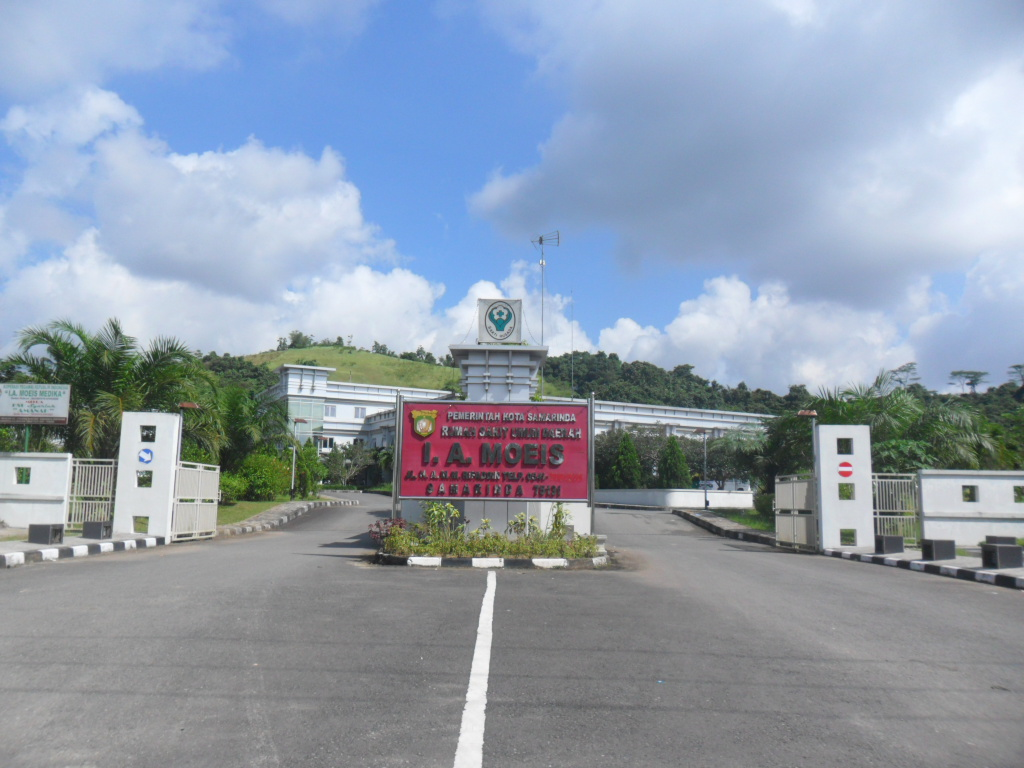
Inche Abdoel Moeis Regional Public Hospital

Samarinda has sufficient healthcare facilities in East Kalimantan. They are also supported by several colleges associated with healthcare, one of those is Abdul Wahab Sjahranie Regional Public Hospital which is affiliated with Mulawarman University and East Kalimantan Healthcare Polytechnic.

== Economy ==
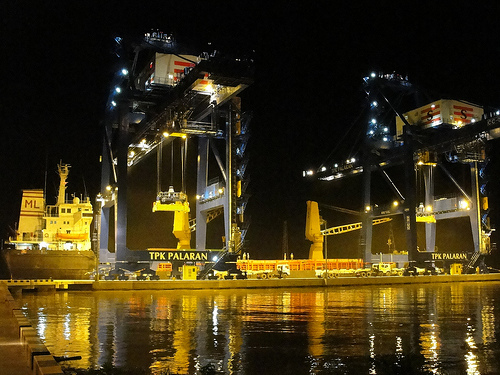
Samarinda is East Kalimantan's largest container ports

Since 2004, trade has been the engine of Samarinda's economic growth. It is also driven by the large amount of logging and oil extraction companies based there. Similar to Balikpapan, many national logging companies are based in Samarinda. There are many abandoned coal mines in Samarinda. Coal mining used to be very popular in Samarinda. However, the Indonesian government revoked many mining licenses due to the use of illegal chemicals and machinery.

Tourism sector also plays an important role in Samarinda's economy; it attracted over 2,000 international tourists and 1.2 million domestic tourists in 2019, making Samarinda the 2nd most popular tourists destination in East Kalimantan. In 2020, agriculture constituted only 2 per cent of GDP, and consists of growing flower varieties (rose, jasmine, orchid) and fruits (pomelo citrus fruit).

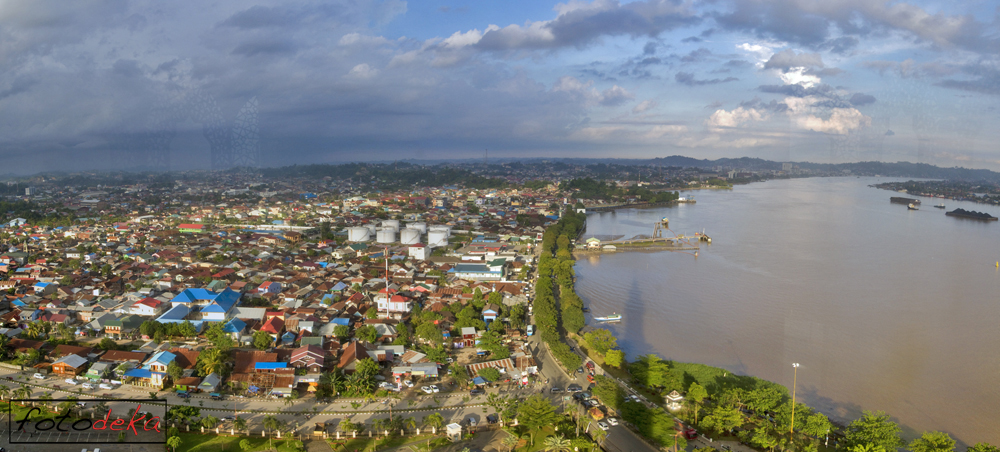
Mahakam River day view, viewed from Islamic Centre Tower, a major tourist attraction that offers views of Mahakam River and its surroundings

=== Banking ===
As of 2024, there are 42 banks operated in Samarinda. The head office of Regional development bank, Bankaltimtara located in the city.

=== Commerce ===
Samarinda is home to several malls and traditional markets. Among them include Samarinda Morning Market, Segiri Market, Samarinda Central Plaza, Mal Lembuswana, and Big Mall Samarinda.

== Tourism ==
=== Nature ===
There are natural tourist attractions such as Tanah Merah Waterfall, Berambai waterfall, Steling Selili Mountain, etc.

=== Culture ===
Budaya Pampang village is located around 20 km from the downtown. The village is known for its attraction by Kenyah people on Sunday.

=== Markets ===
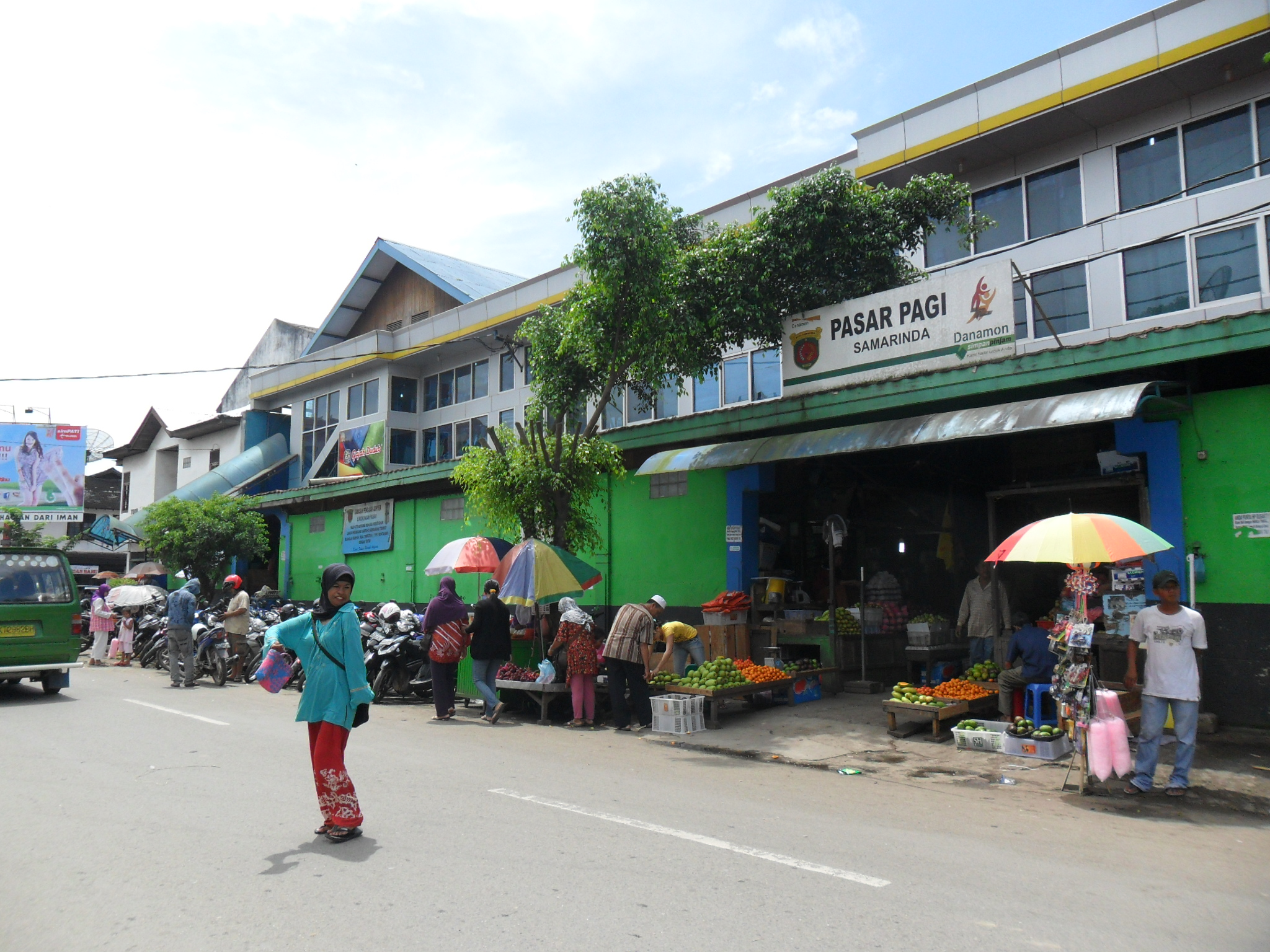
Pasar Pagi, the oldest market in Samarinda

There are 10 markets scattered in Samarinda. The oldest one is Pasar Pagi (Morning Market), which was built on the river bank. As the city grew, the market relocated away from the river. While Palaran Trade Centre (PTC) is the first market in Samarinda with a modern concept, the market was opened on 10 May 2010.

== Transport ==
The main transport infrastructure of Samarinda is different than every other cities in Kalimantan, characterised by more dominant private companies and local government involvement compared to national government involvement. Those are Samarinda International Airport (East Kalimantan government), SkyTrain rapid transit project (public-private partnership), Samarinda Tunnel project (Samarinda Government) and Port of Palaran (private).

=== Water ===
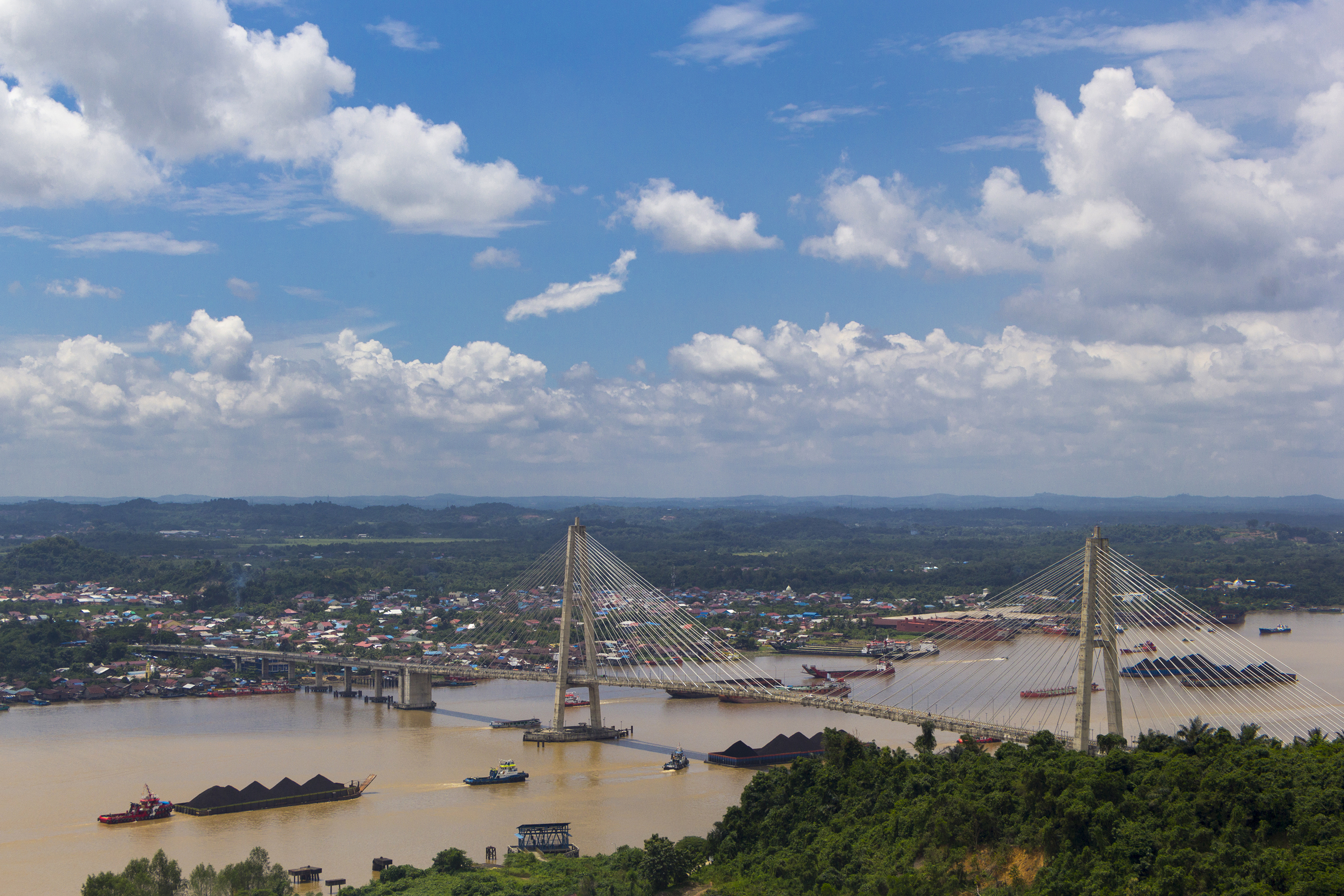
Achmad Amins Bridge

As a city located on the Mahakam river, Samarinda has a history of water transportation. The notable transportation is Tambangan and Ketinting. Tambangan used to cross the river from Samarinda Seberang to Pasar Pagi, while Ketinting became the transportation to cross the river or to other places. Ferries used to operate from Harapan Baru, Samarinda Seberang to Samarinda city for transporting vehicles.

After the Mahakam Bridge was erected in 1986, the usage of Tambangan and Ketinting decreased though didn't significantly, and ferries ceased to exist.

Besides Mahakam Bridge, there are 3 other bridges such as Mahakam Ulu Bridge, Achmad Amins Bridge, and Mahakam IV Bridge.

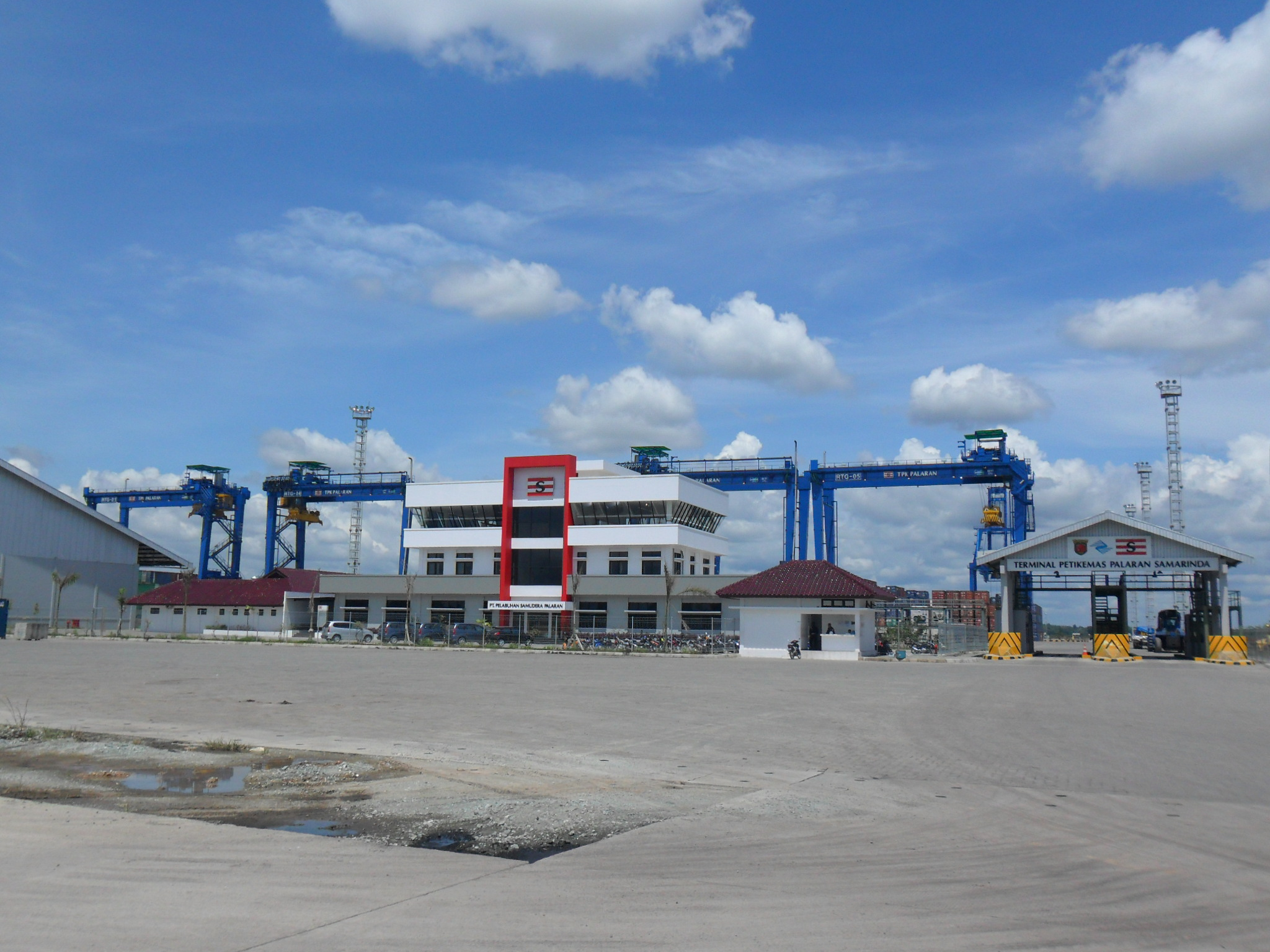
Container port in Palaran

The prominent coal loading port of Tanjung Bara (TBCT) lies about 160 kilometres to the north of Samarinda.

There is also a container port located in Palaran operated since 2010, which is used to replace the older port. During the construction of the IKN, the port has been officially designated as National Vital Object since 2023.

=== Land ===
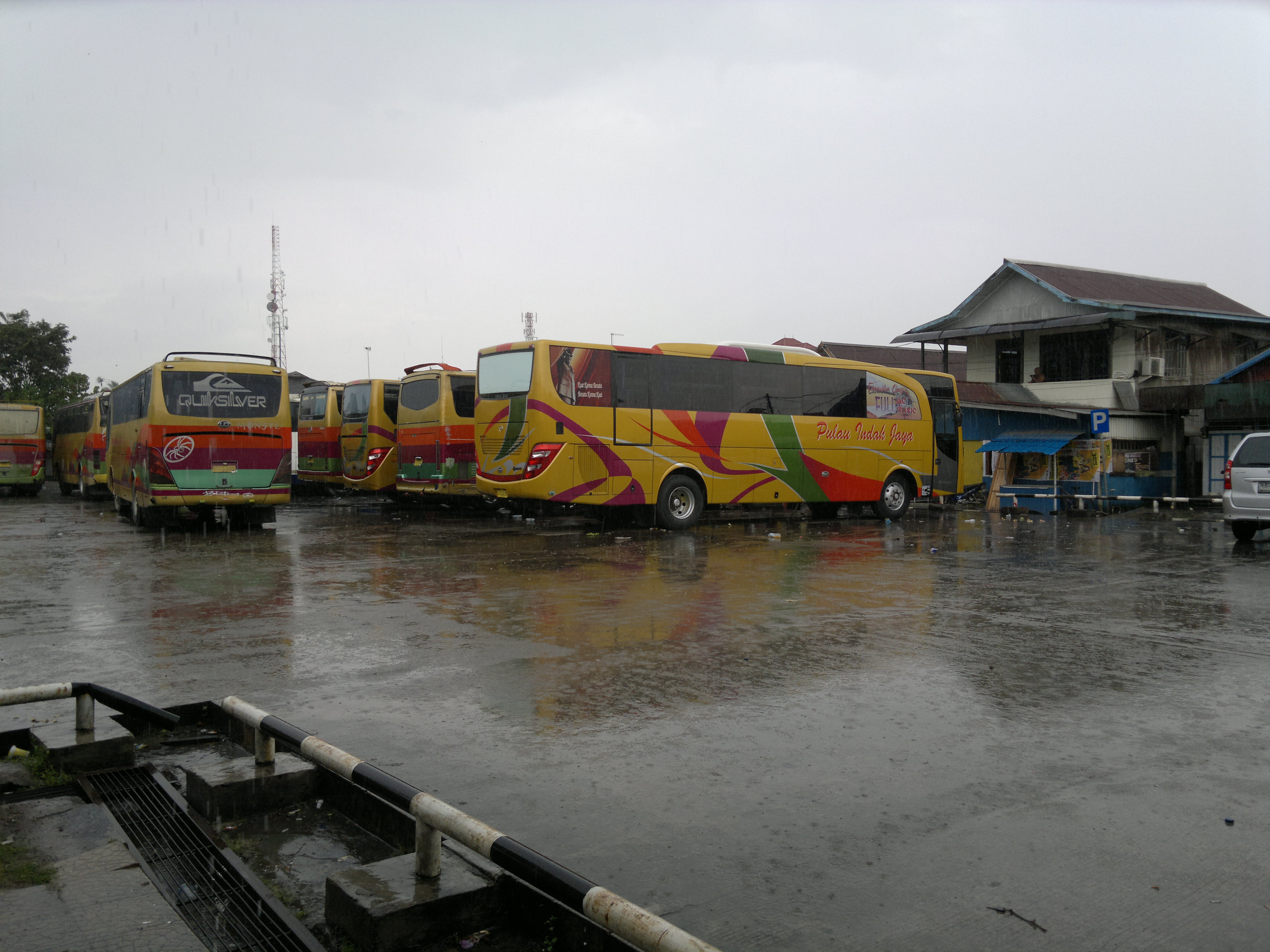
Seberang Bus Terminus

There are about 850,000 vehicles registered in Samarinda, the highest number of vehicles of any city in East Kalimantan. Samarinda has 3 bus terminals. There are:

1. Sungai Kunjang Bus Terminus which served routes to Balikpapan, Kutai Kartanegara, and West Kutai.
2. Lempake Bus Terminus which served routes to Bontang and East Kutai.
3. Seberang Bus Terminus which served routes to Paser and South Kalimantan.

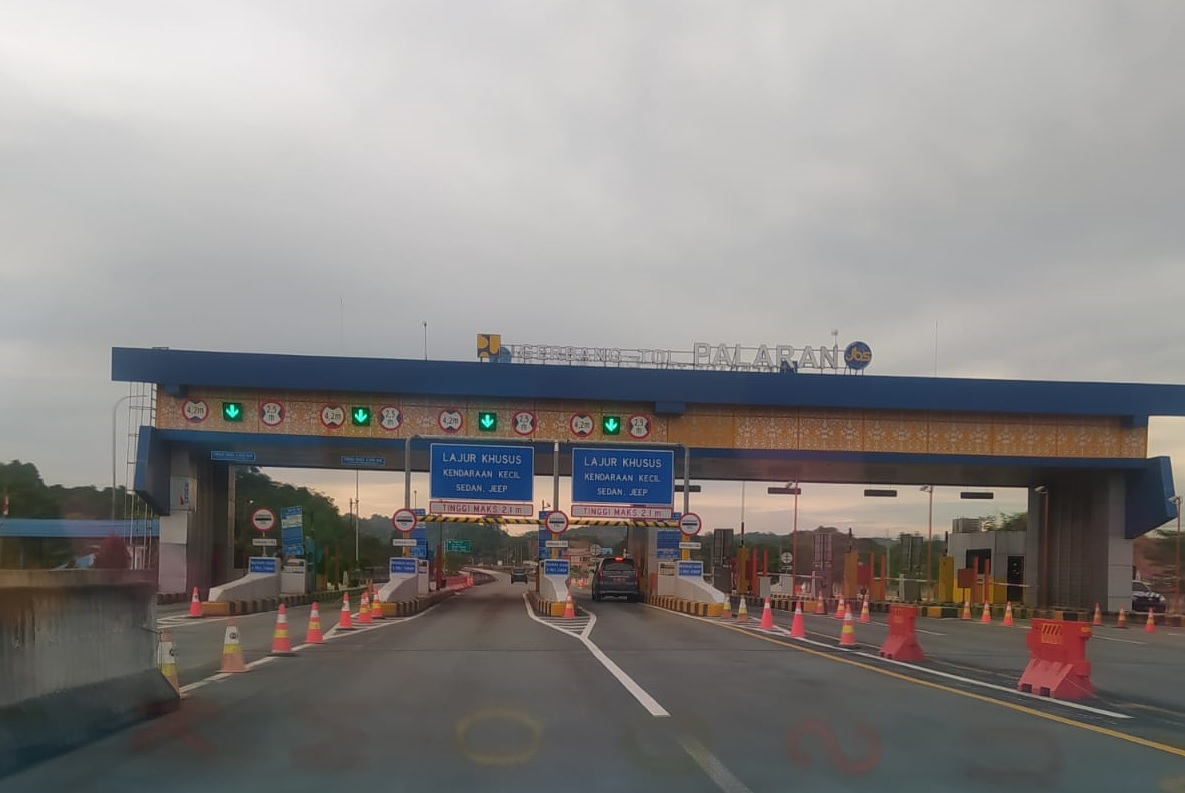
Toll gate at Palaran

Samarinda is connected by Trans-Kalimantan Highway Southern Route from Balikpapan to Samarinda; the highway runs in parallel with the first controlled-access expressway in Borneo, the Samarinda-Balikpapan Toll Road. Samarinda also will be connected with Bontang through Samarinda-Bontang Toll Road, which is in construction and will be completed in 2026.

=== Air ===
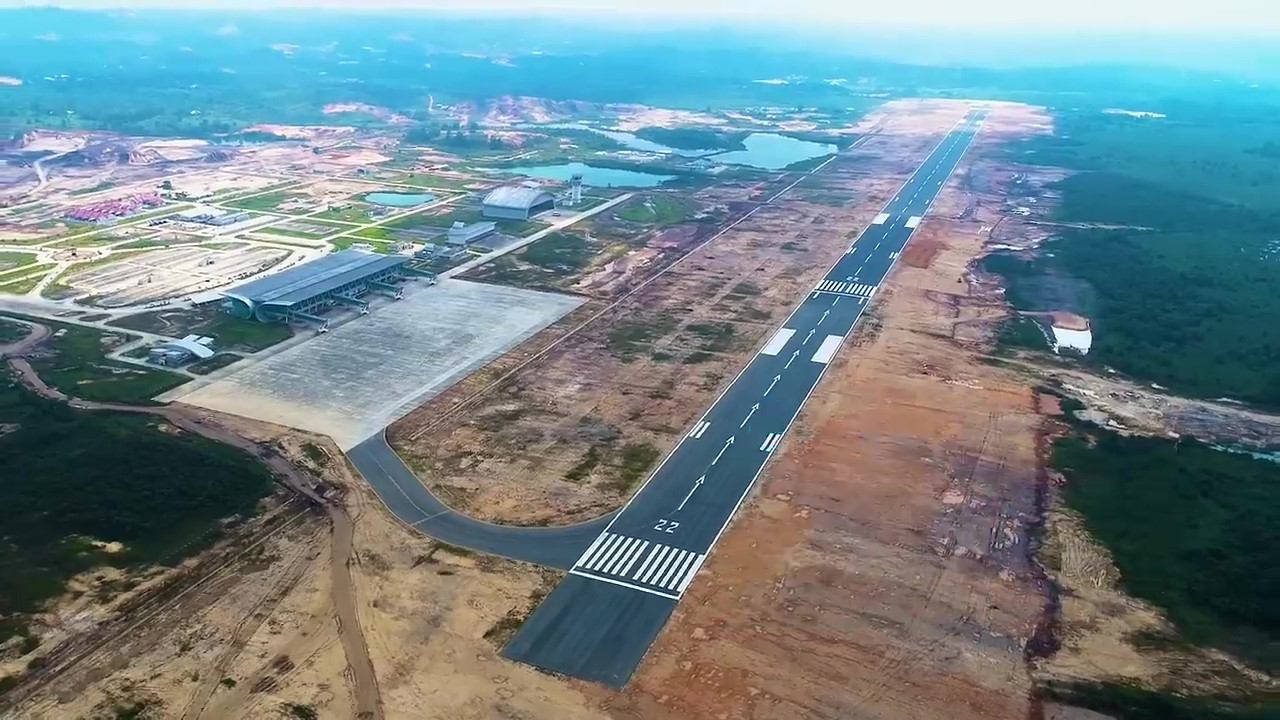
Aerial view of Samarinda International Airport in 2018

APT Pranoto (Samarinda Sungai Siring, AAP) International Airport is the primary airport for the city and has been at Sungai Siring since 2018. With over 1 million passengers annually, it is one of East Kalimantan's busiest airports in terms of passenger and cargo movements. AAP is an important Australian passenger gateway for East Kalimantan's wildlife. AAP was built to replace Temindung Airport in Bandara, Sungai Pinang.

== Sport ==
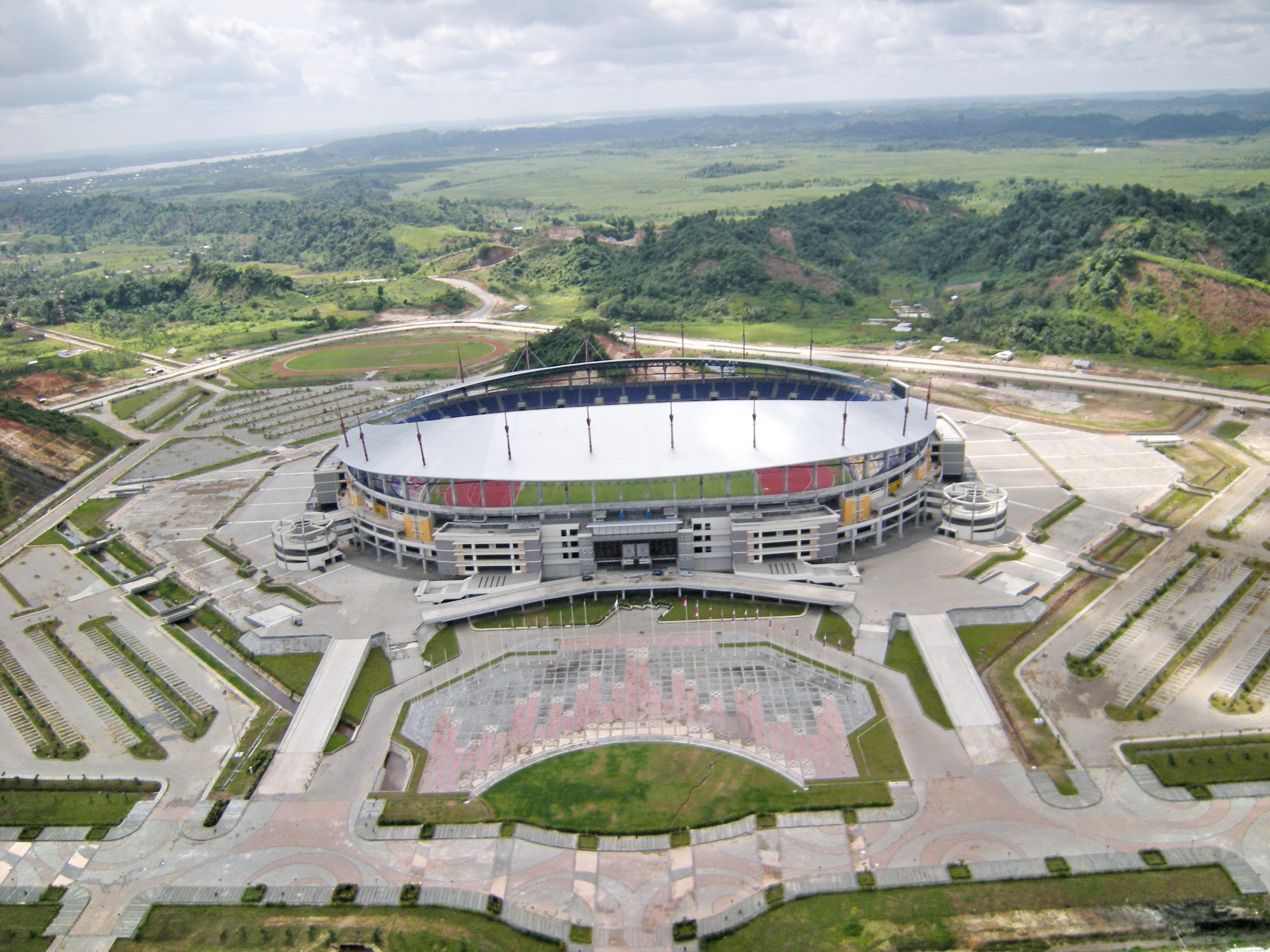
Palaran Stadium

Samarinda has sports facilities such as basketball courts, football fields, and rock climbing. Samarinda also has 3 stadiums, which are Gelora Kadri Oening Stadium, Segiri Stadium, and Palaran Stadium.

Samarinda is home to professional football club which competes in Super League, Borneo FC with Segiri Stadium as their ground.

== Media ==
=== Television ===
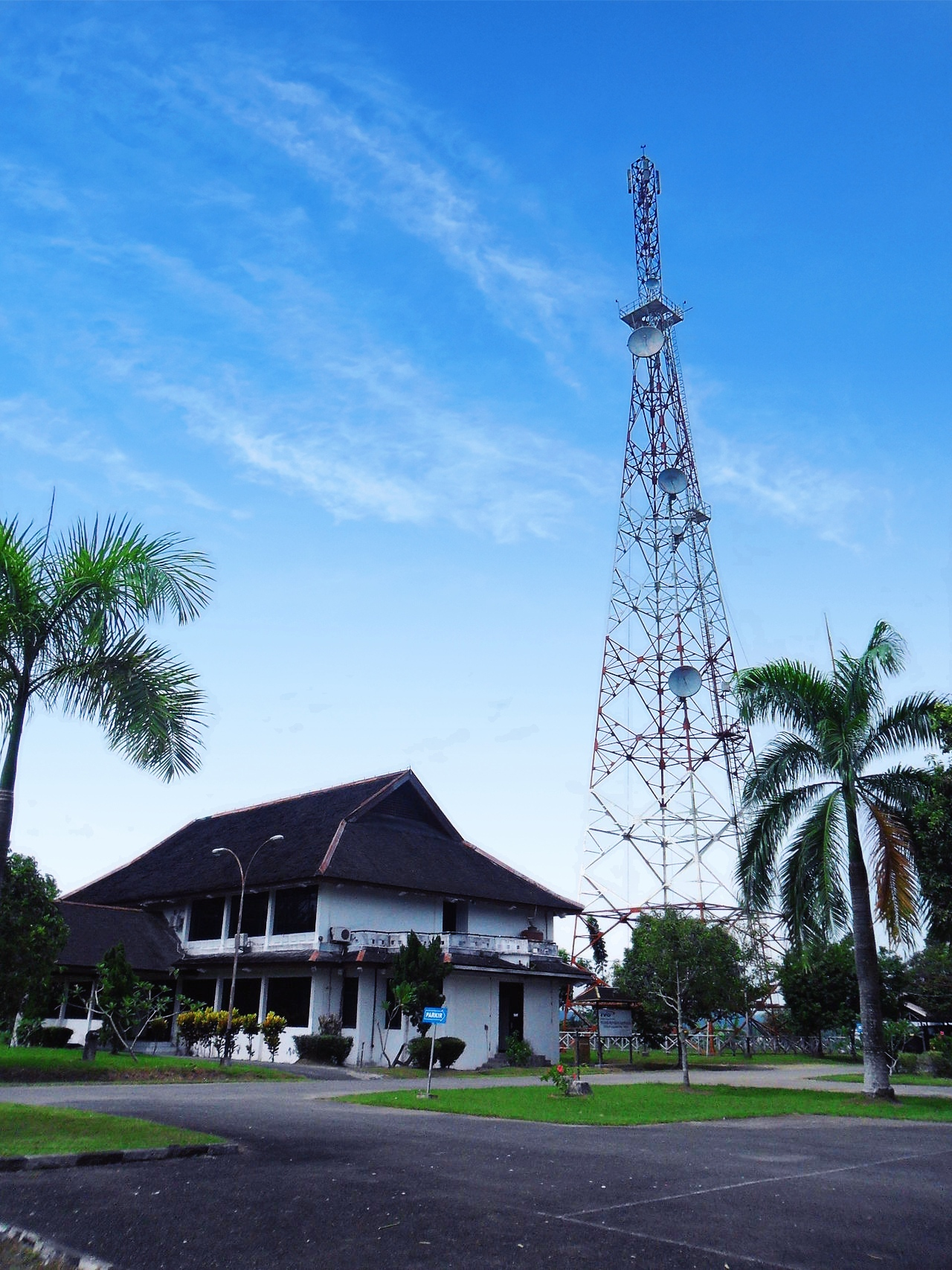
TVRI East Kalimantan station

Currently there are only 2 local TV stations, which are TVRI East Kalimantan, and Tepian TV. There were also Samarinda TV and Samcom TV, both of which have ceased to broadcast in different periods of time.

=== Newspaper ===
The first newspapers in Samarinda were Persatoen and Perasaan Kita. Both were not daily newspapers. The first daily newspapers in Samarinda were Surat Kabar Pewarta Borneo and Pantjaran Berita.

During the New Order era, there were only 2 newspapers allowed in East Kalimantan. Manuntung (became known as Kaltim Post) and Suara Kaltim (before renamed to Swara Kaltim).

The current newspapers are Samarinda Pos (which is a subsidiary of Kaltim Post Group), KoranKaltim, Kalpost, and Express.
