= Achmad Amins Bridge =

Bridge in Samarinda, Indonesia

Achmad Amins Bridge Jembatan Achmad Amins
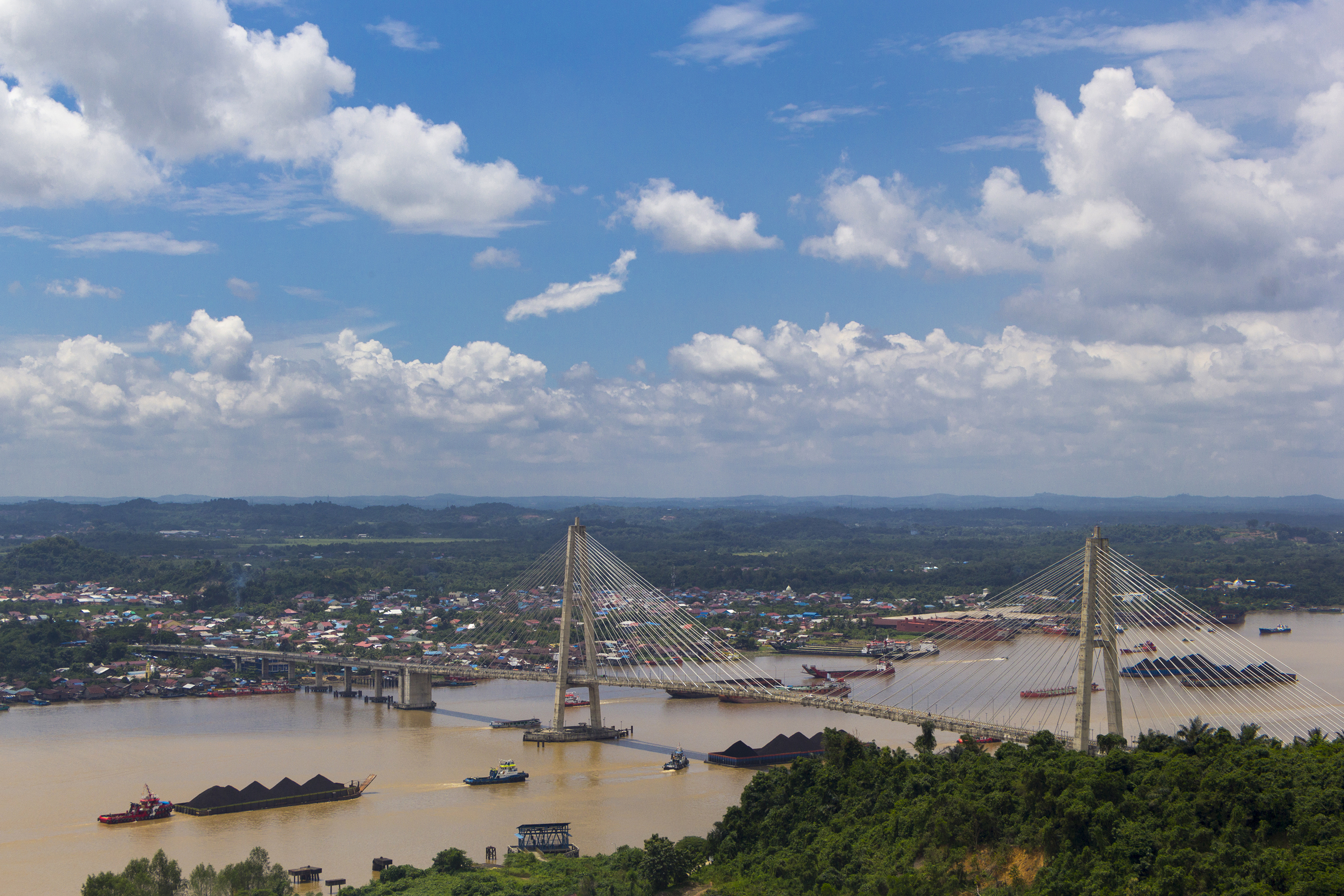
- The bridge, as seen in 2020
- Coordinates: 0°31′58″S 117°09′32″E
- Crosses: Mahakam River
- Locale: Samarinda, Indonesia

Characteristics
- Total length: 1,428 meters

History
- Construction start: 2002
- Opened: 2017

Statistics
- Toll: Free

The Achmad Amins Bridge (previously called the Mahkota II Bridge) is a bridge that connects the Kapih River, Sambutan with Simpang Pasir, Palaran in the city of Samarinda, Indonesia. The bridge, which is 1,428 meters long, is the longest bridge in East Kalimantan.

== Naming ==
Since its construction was initiated until it was inaugurated, the bridge was called Mahkota II (Mahakam City II) because it was the second bridge built in the Samarinda City area after the Mahakam Bridge (or Mahkota I). On June 10, 2021, the bridge changed its name to "Achmad Amins Bridge". This name comes from Achmad Amins (id), who is the 8th mayor of Samarinda who began ruling in the 2000–2005 period.

== Construction ==
The Mahkota II Bridge construction project began in 2002 and was stopped or stalled because funding was no longer disbursed from the APBN, along with plans to move the Port of Samarinda and the completion of the Palaran container port. If the construction of the bridge continues, it will disrupt shipping traffic on the Mahakam River. Funding for the Mahkota II Bridge construction project was diverted to build the Mahakam Ulu Bridge which does not interfere with shipping to Samarinda Harbor. Construction of the bridge is continuing and is targeted to be completed by the end of 2016 and can be used on January 21, 2017.

== Opening ==
With various considerations and a safety testing process, Mahkota II Bridge was finally able to be opened to the public as part of a three-week trial since June 21, 2017. Initially, the bridge was only operated from 06.00 WITA until 18.00 WITA because at that time the lights were on. not installed yet. Apart from that, only two-wheeled vehicles and minibuses can pass. There had been rumors that the Mahkota II Bridge had cracked. For this reason, the Samarinda Public Works and Public Housing Service (PUPR) Technical Team immediately took quick steps to check the condition of the bridge and ensure that the bridge was safe to cross. The team stated that there were no cracks but only an overlap of cement between the old concrete joint and the new concrete. It looks cracked because it has become a path for water. So, moss grows and looks like cracks when photographed from under the bridge.

== See also ==
- List of bridges in Indonesia
