= Anggana =

- District
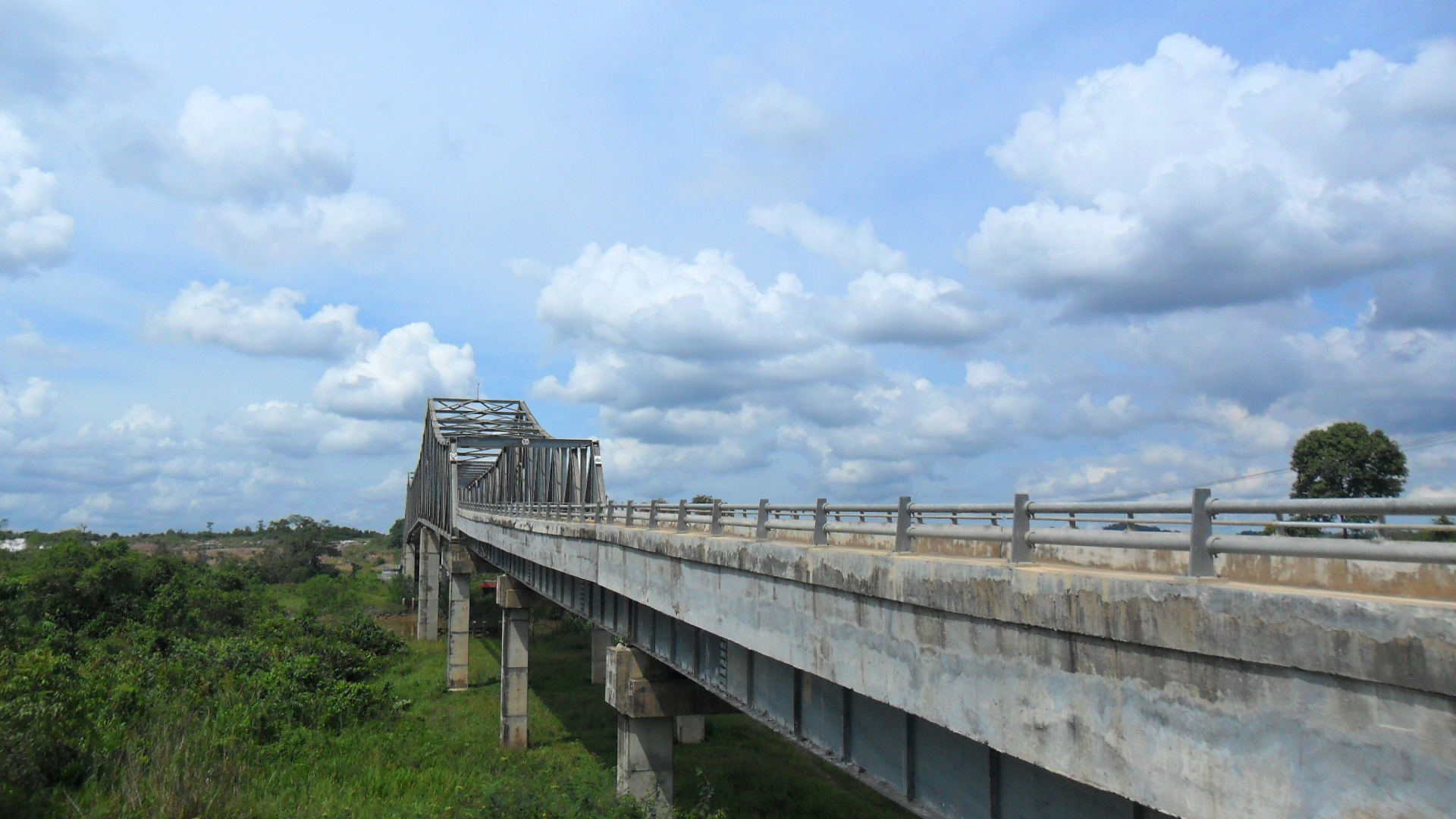
- Kutai Lama Bridge
- Interactive map of Anggana
- Location Anggana (Kalimantan) Anggana (Indonesia)
- Coordinates: 0°34′22.38265″S 117°16′1.78842″E
- Country: Indonesia
- Province: East Kalimantan
- Regency: Kutai Kartanegara
- District seat: Sungai Meriam

Government
  - District head (Camat): Rendra Abadi

Area
  - Total: 1,798.80 km^{2} (694.52 sq mi)

Population (2023)
  - Total: 38,674
  - Density: 21.500/km^{2} (55.684/sq mi)
- Time zone: UTC+8 (ICT)
- Villages: 5

Anggana (Indonesian pronunciation: [aŋˈɡana]) is the easternmost district of Kutai Kartanegara Regency, East Kalimantan, Indonesia. As of 2023, it was inhabited by 38,674 people, and currently has the total area of 1,798.80 km^{2}. Its district seat is located at the village of Sungai Meriam.

Anggana borders the districts of Sambutan (of which formerly part of it until 21 October 1987) and North Samarinda, Samarinda to the west. It also borders Muara Badak to the north, and to the south, Palaran and Sanga-Sanga, despite narrowly separated by the Mahakam. It is the site of Kutai Lama, which is notable for being the capital of the Sultanate of Kutai from 14th century to 18th century.

== Governance ==
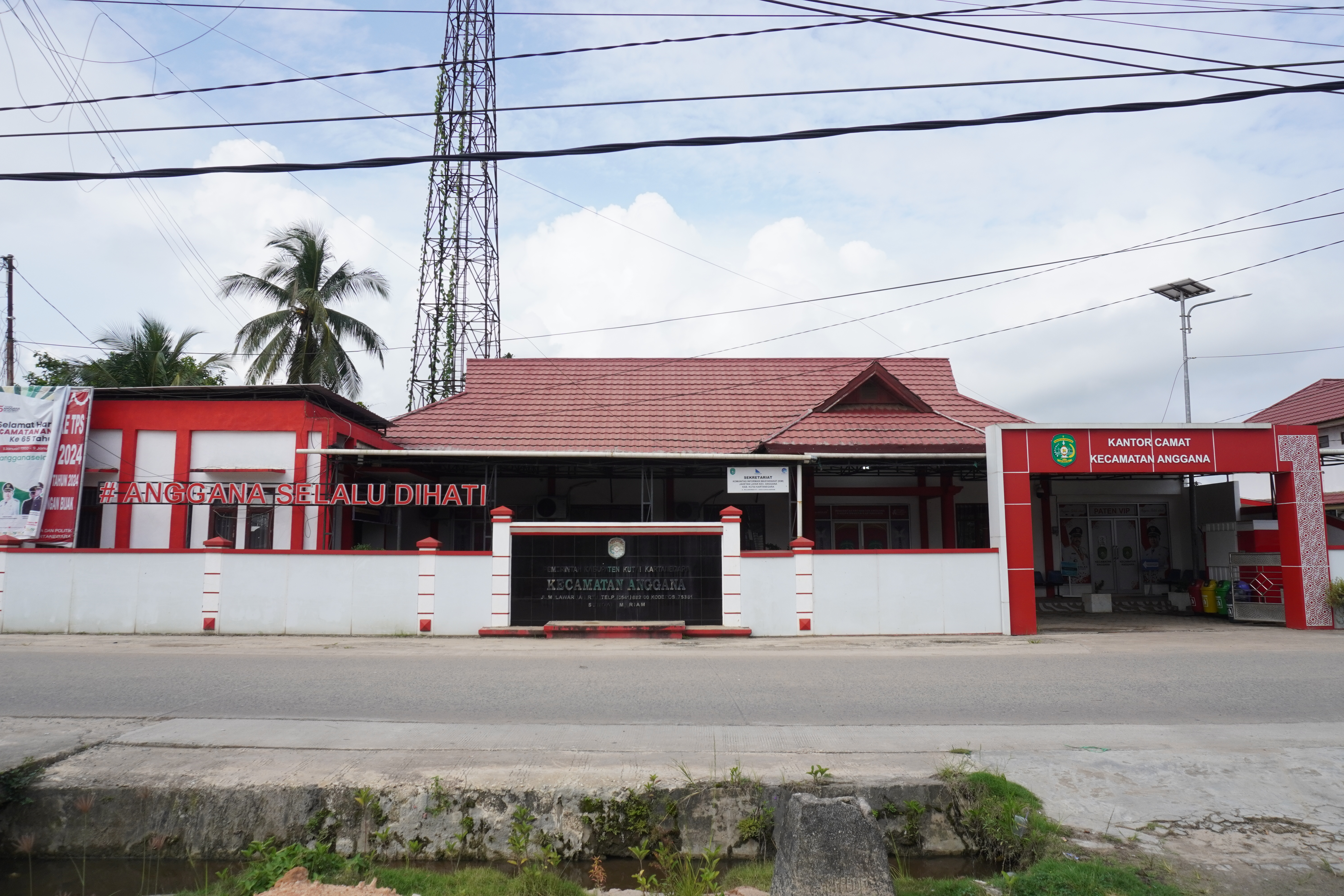
District head office at Sungai Meriam, Anggana.

=== Villages ===
Anggana is divided into the following 8 villages (desa):

Regional code (Kode wilayah)	Name	Area (km^{2})	Population (2023)	Hamlets (dusun)	RT (rukun tetangga)
64.02.04.2001	Sepatin	624.87	2,972	3	15
64.02.04.2002	Muara Pantuan	513.32	2,930	5	20
64.02.04.2003	Tani Baru	71.50	2,022	3	20
64.02.04.2004	Kutai Lama	308.95	4,540	2	11
64.02.04.2005	Anggana	97.12	3,920	3	14
64.02.04.2006	Sungai Meriam	116.54	12,622	5	28
64.02.04.2007	Sidomulyo	30.00	4,410	4	16
64.02.04.2008	Handil Terusan	36.50	5,258	3	15
	Totals	1,798.80	38,674	28	139
