= Loa Kulu =

District of Kutai Kartanegara Regency, East Kalimantan

- District
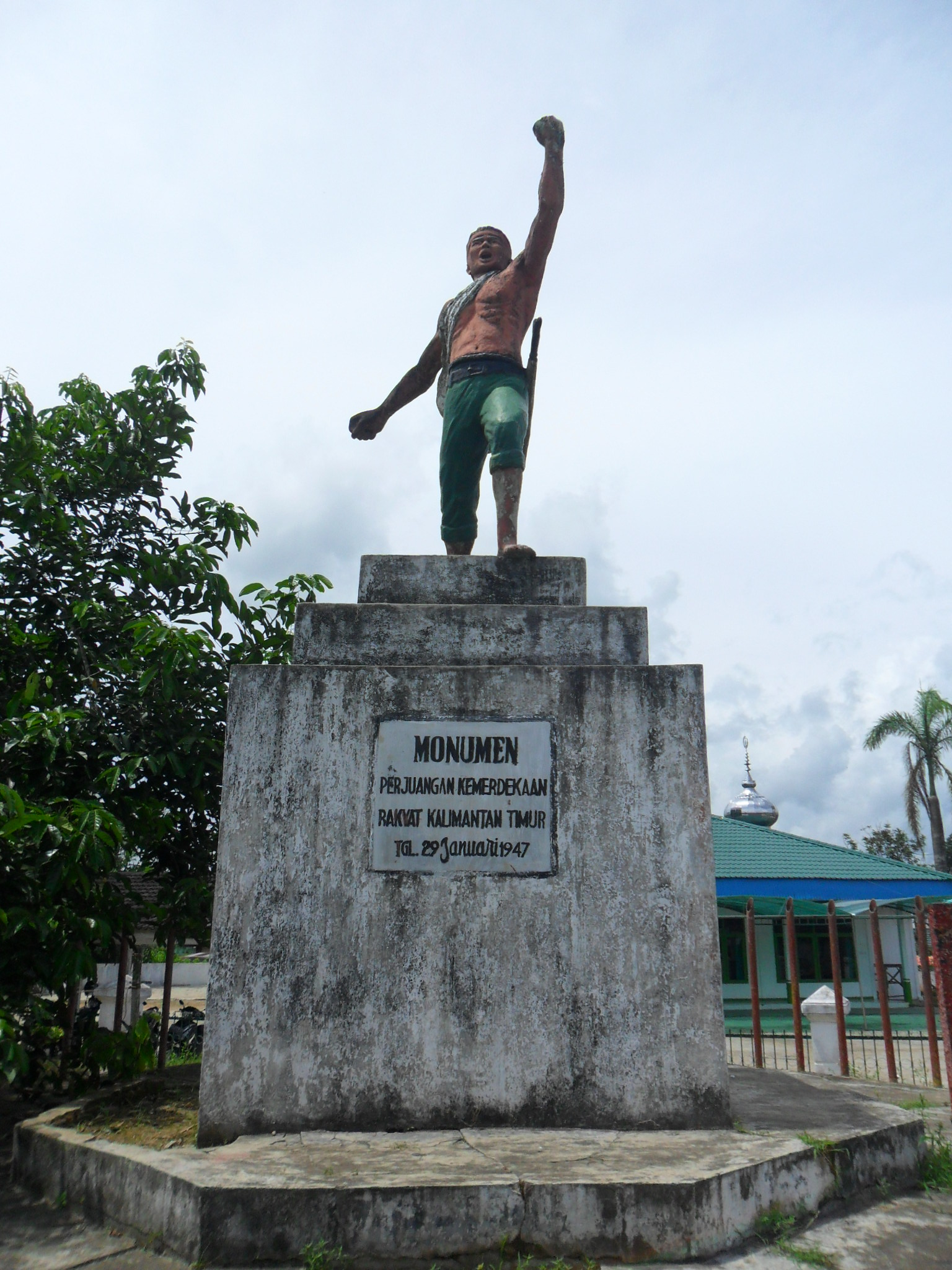
- Independence Struggle Monument
- Interactive map of Loa Kulu
- Location Loa Kulu (Indonesia)
- Coordinates: 0°30′50.17306″S 117°1′13.98698″E
- Country: Indonesia
- Province: East Kalimantan
- Regency: Kutai Kartanegara
- District seat: Loh Sumber

Government
  - District head (camat): Ardiansyah

Area
  - Total: 1,614.96 km^{2} (623.54 sq mi)

Population (mid 2024 estimate)
  - Total: 62,894
  - Density: 38.945/km^{2} (100.87/sq mi)
- Time zone: UTC+8 (ICT)
- Regional code: 64.02.02

Loa Kulu (Indonesian pronunciation: [ˈlo(w)a ˈkulu]) is a district of the Kutai Kartanegara Regency, East Kalimantan, Indonesia. It covers a land area of 1,614.96 km^{2}, and had a population of 39,938 at the 2010 Census and 51,639 at the 2020 Census' the official estimate as at mid 2025 was 62,894 inhabitants. Its district seat is Loh Sumber. Much of the southern part of the district's area is included within the development of the new national capital of Nusantara.

== History ==
During the Dutch East Indies colonial rule, Loa Kulu was a fairly important coal producing area with the operation of a coal mining company called Oost Borneo Maatschapij (OBM) in the late 19th century. Coal exploitation in Loa Kulu district ended in 1970, exactly 2 years after PN Tambang Batubara took over from OBM in 1968. Since then, Loa Kulu, which was once busy, has gradually become deserted, abandoned by thousands of mine workers.

== Governance ==
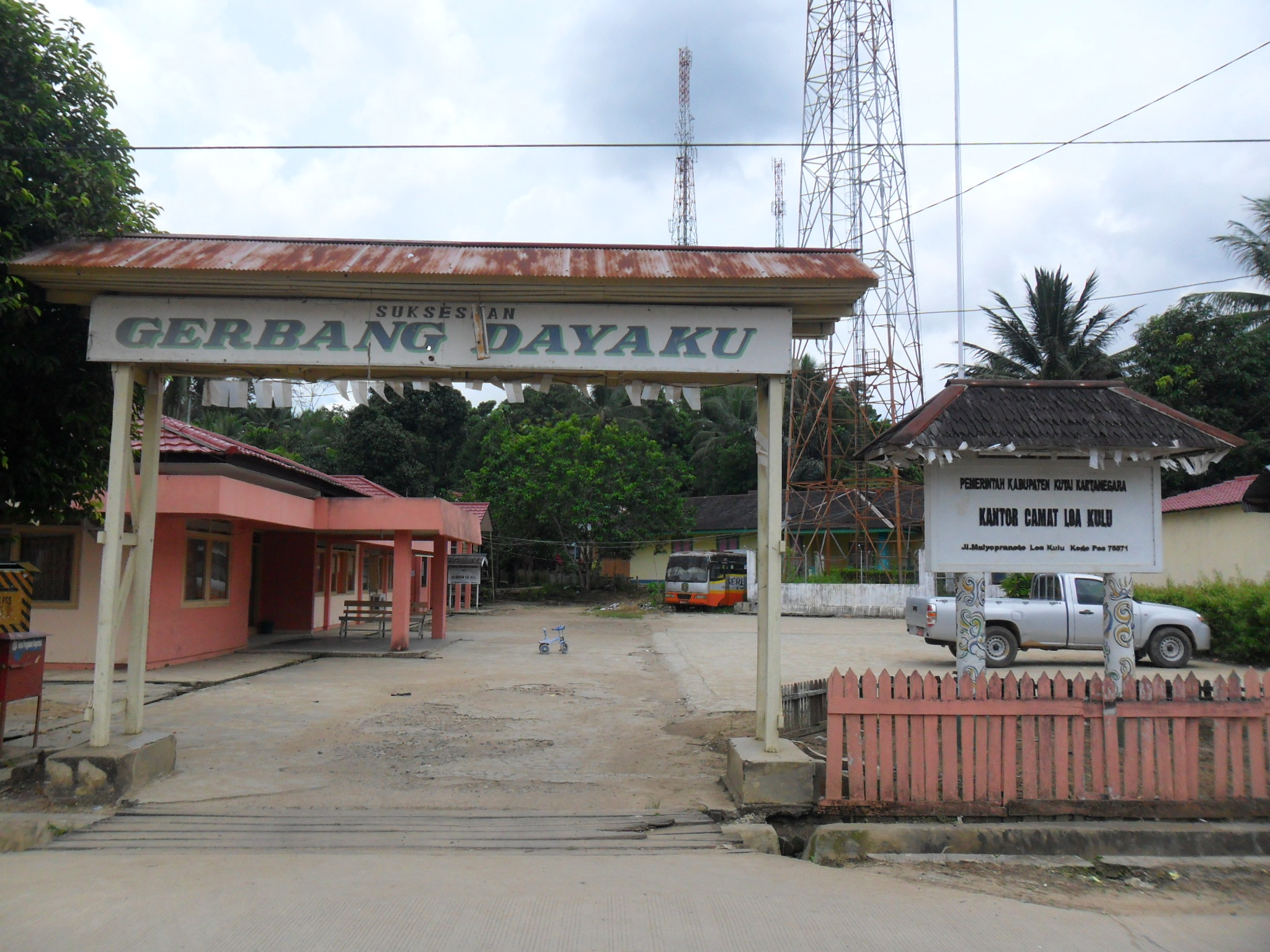
The district head office at Loa Kulu.

=== Villages ===
Loa Kulu District is divided into the following fifteen villages (desa):

Regional code (Kode wilayah)	Name	Area (km^{2})	Population (2024)	RT (rukun tetangga)
64.02.02.2001	Jonggon Desa	278.00	3,478	18
64.02.02.2002	Sungai Payang	416.90	3,145	20
64.02.02.2003	Jembayan	170.78	10,902	24
64.02.02.2004	Loa Kulu Kota	146.00	2,881	23
64.02.02.2005	Loh Sumber	109.50	4,492	11
64.02.02.2006	Ponoragan	91.20	8,351	8
64.02.02.2007	Rempanga	56.00	3,723	9
64.02.02.2008	Margahayu	62.50	3,124	25
64.02.02.2009	Jonggon Jaya	62.50	4,131	17
64.02.02.2010	Lung Anai	1.10	475	4
64.02.02.2011	Central Jembayan (Jembayan Tengah)	4.72	2,150	11
64.02.02.2012	Jembayan Dalam	6.50	1,936	10
64.02.02.2013	Sepakat		3,745	6
64.02.02.2014	Sumber Sari		2,682	11
64.02.02.2015	Jongkang		1,833	7
	Totals	1,614.96	57,048	204

The administrative villages of Sepakat, Sumber Sari, and Jongkang were all inaugurated on 28 December 2011, by respectively splitting them from Loa Kulu Kota, Loh Sumber, and Rempanga. Their exact areas are still uncalculated.

== Demographics ==
=== Ethnic groups ===
Loa Kulu is a multi-ethnic district. It is inhabited by various ethnic groups, including the indigenous Dayak, Kutai, and Paser peoples. There are also Javanese, Bugis, and Banjarese immigrants.

There were two separate southward migration waves of Dayak peoples into Loa Kulu, none of them are truly indigenous to the area. Its western part which includes Jonggon Desa (or Jonggon), particularly, has been inhabited by the Basap people since 18th to 19th centuries, following their migration from Manubar (Sandaran, East Kutai). Meanwhile, inhabitants of Lung Anai are mostly Kenyah people who migrated from Apo Kayan during the Indonesia–Malaysia confrontation (similar to the history of Budaya Pampang).

The following are the majority ethnic groups per village in Loa Kulu district.

Village	Majority	Ref.
Jonggon Desa	Dayak	
Sungai Payang	Dayak or Kutai	
Jembayan	Kutai	
Loa Kulu Kota	Kutai	
Loh Sumber	Javanese	
Ponoragan	Javanese	
Rempanga	Javanese	
Margahayu	Javanese or Bugis	
Jonggon Jaya	Javanese	
Lung Anai	Dayak	
Central Jembayan (Jembayan Tengah)	Banjarese	
Jembayan Dalam	Kutai	
Sepakat	Javanese	
Sumber Sari	Javanese	
Jongkang	Javanese or Kutai	

=== Religion ===
Based on their religion, the majority of Loa Kulu residents are Muslims, practiced mainly by the Kutai, Paser, Javanese, Banjarese, and Bugis peoples, besides that there is also Christianity which is mainly practiced by the Dayak people. Referring to data as of December 2024, the number of Muslims was 54,722, Protestants 2,565, Catholics 559, Buddhists 12, and Hindus 6.
