= Sambutan =

District of Samarinda, East Kalimantan

- District
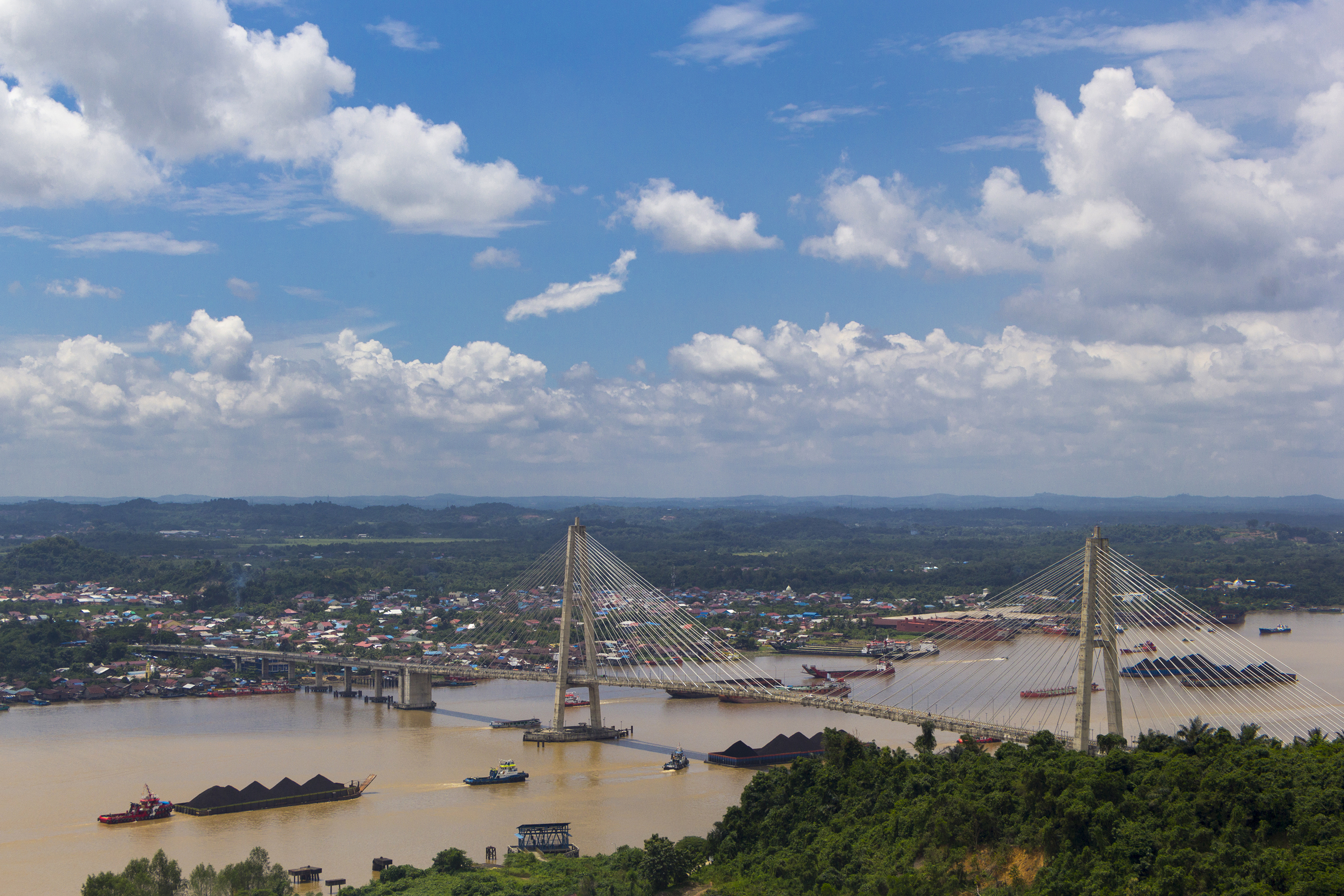
- Achmad Amins Bridge
- Interactive map of Sambutan
- Location Sambutan (Indonesia)
- Coordinates: 0°30′26.21581″S 117°10′9.30104″E
- Country: Indonesia
- Province: East Kalimantan
- City: Samarinda
- Established: 14 December 2010
- District seat: Sambutan

Government
  - District head (Camat): Norbaiti Zarta

Area
  - Total: 100.59 km^{2} (38.84 sq mi)

Population (2024)
  - Total: 64,310
  - Density: 639.3/km^{2} (1,656/sq mi)
- Time zone: UTC+8 (ICT)
- Regional code: 64.72.07
- Villages: 5

Sambutan (Indonesian pronunciation: [ˈsambutan]) is a district of Samarinda, East Kalimantan, Indonesia. As of 2024, it was inhabited by 64,310 people (an increase from 62,429 people in 2023), and currently has the total area of 100.59 square kilometres (38.84 sq mi). It was separated from Samarinda Ilir on 14 December 2010. Its district seat is located at the village of Sambutan.

Sambutan borders Kutai Kartanegara Regency (specifically the district of Anggana) to the east.

== History ==
=== Etymology ===
According to the local legends, it begins with a crocodile who lived in the Mahakam and liked to receive tree branches falling into the river. Also, the region was mostly inhabited by Banjar people, who are known for their culture of welcoming (menyambut — sambutan "greeting") guests in a friendly and sincere manner. Eventually, it gave its name to the river and also the eponymous village of Sambutan.

The book Dari Swapraja ke Kabupaten Kutai, dated from 1979, however, claimed that its older form was Sambuyutan, as mentioned by a genealogy of the Sultanate of Kutai. Context:

At the same time when the erau was held, they celebrated Putri Karang Melenu, daughter of Babu Jaruma at Hulu Dusun, because it was time to step her feet to the earth. Babu Jaruma invited the locals of (the following villages): (...)

=== Modern history ===
Sambutan initially did not exist as the name of an administrative unit, until it was separated from neighbouring Sungai Kapih in 1948 (just three years after the proclamation of Indonesian independence) to form its own village (kampung). Kamarudin was the first person to hold office as the village chief of Sambutan.

Until 21 October 1987, what is now part of Sambutan (listed as Sambutan, Sungai Kapih, and Pulau Atas) were once part of the district of Anggana, Kutai Regency. They were transferred to Samarinda in exchange for return of Sanga-Sanga, Muara Jawa, and Samboja districts into Kutai Kartanegara. On 14 December 2010, Sambutan was created from eastern parts of Samarinda Ilir. and as a result, the district's seat was relocated from Sambutan to Sidomulyo. Its first district head was inaugurated on 31 December by mayor of Samarinda, Syaharie Jaang, along with other newly created districts.

== Governance ==
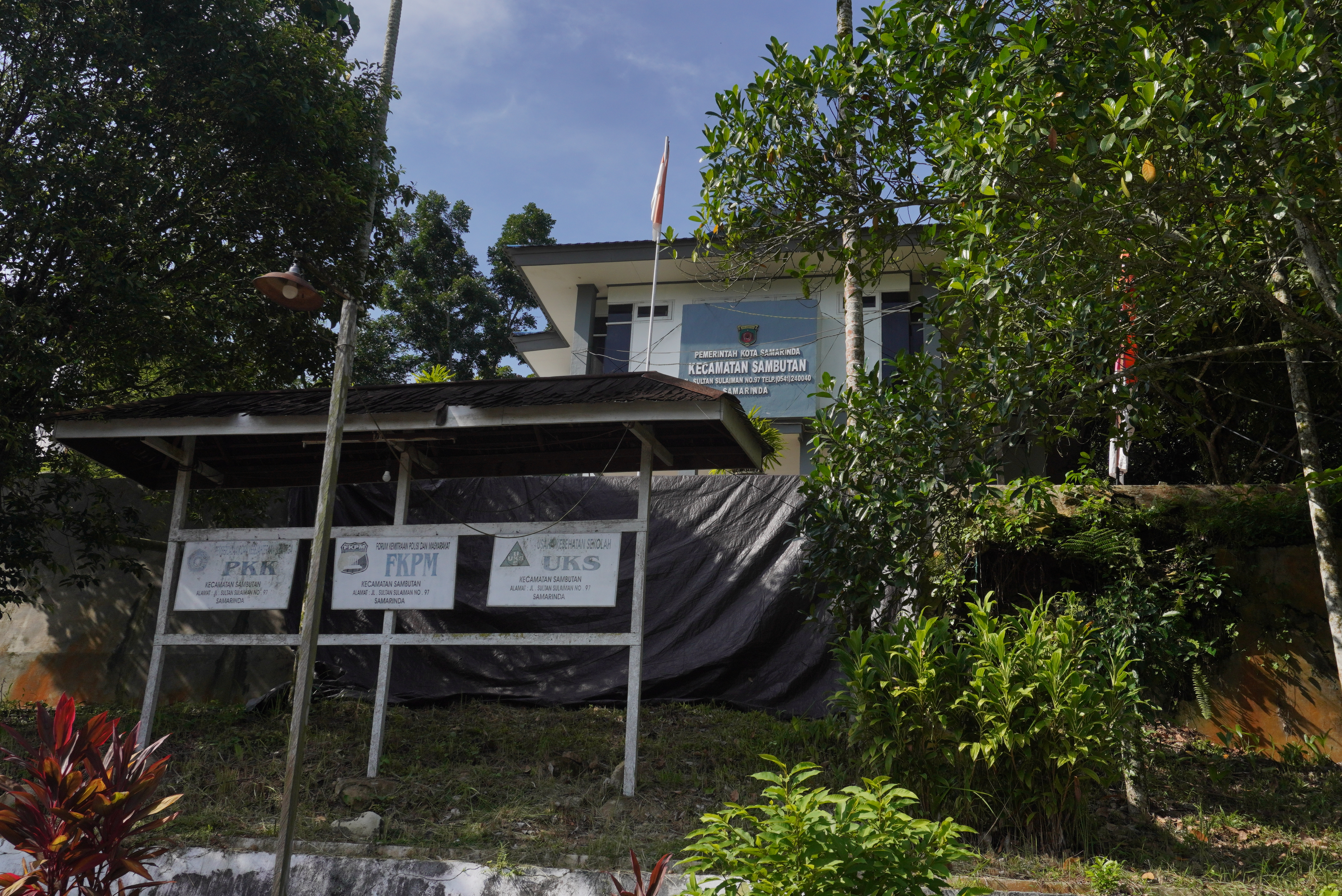
District head office at Sambutan, Sambutan.

=== Villages ===
Sambutan is divided into the following 5 villages (kelurahan):

| Regional code (Kode wilayah) | Name | Area (km^{2}) | Population (2023) | RT (rukun tetangga) |
|---|---|---|---|---|
| 64.72.07.1001 | Sungai Kapih | 17.70 | 15,836 | 25 |
| 64.72.07.1002 | Sambutan | 31.00 | 27,983 | 40 |
| 64.72.07.1003 | Makroman | 20.96 | 10,762 | 27 |
| 64.72.07.1004 | Sindang Sari | 1.70 | 4,183 | 10 |
| 64.72.07.1005 | Pulau Atas | 29.59 | 3,665 | 9 |
| | Totals | 100.95 | 62,429 | 111 |

== Infrastructure ==
=== Education ===
As of 2023/2024 school year, Sambutan had 14 kindergartens (1 of them was public), 17 elementary schools (3 private), 6 junior high schools (1 private), 2 public senior high schools, 2 private madrasah ibtidaiyah (Islamic elementary schools), and 4 private madrasah tsanawiyah (Islamic junior high schools).
