= Mahakam Bridge =

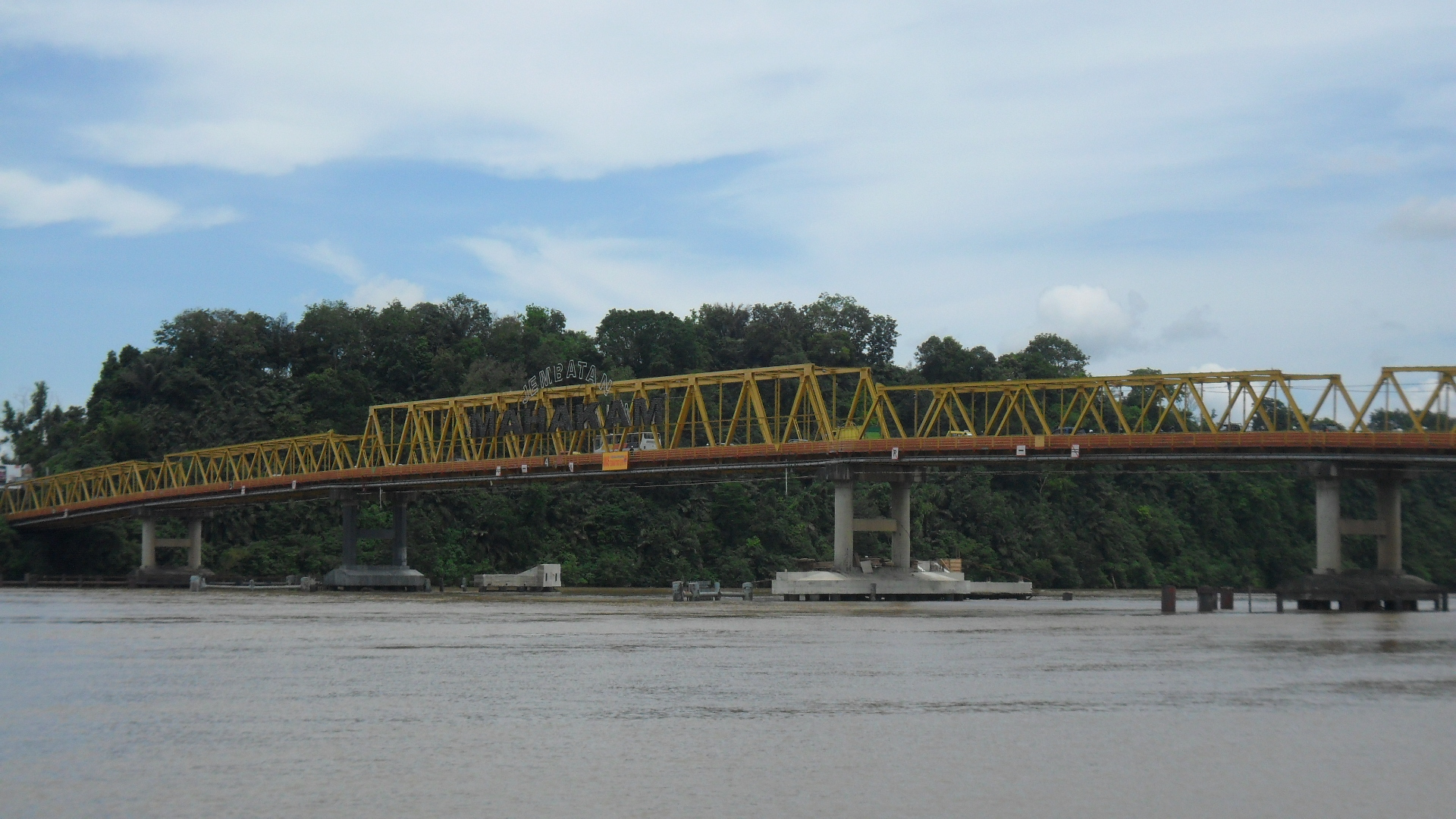
- Mahakam Bridge (2011)
- Coordinates: 0.5198°S 117.1191°E
- Carries: two-wheeled vehicles, four-wheel vehicles, and pedestrians
- Crosses: Mahakam River
- Locale: Samarinda, East Kalimantan
- Official name: Jembatan Mahakam; Jembatan Mahkota

Characteristics
- Total length: 400 metres

History
- Construction start: 1982
- Construction end: 3 August 1986
- Opened: 1987

Mahakam Bridge is a bridge that crosses the Mahakam River in Samarinda, East Kalimantan province, Indonesia.

Mahakam Bridge was built in 1987 and inaugurated by the President of Indonesia, Soeharto.
