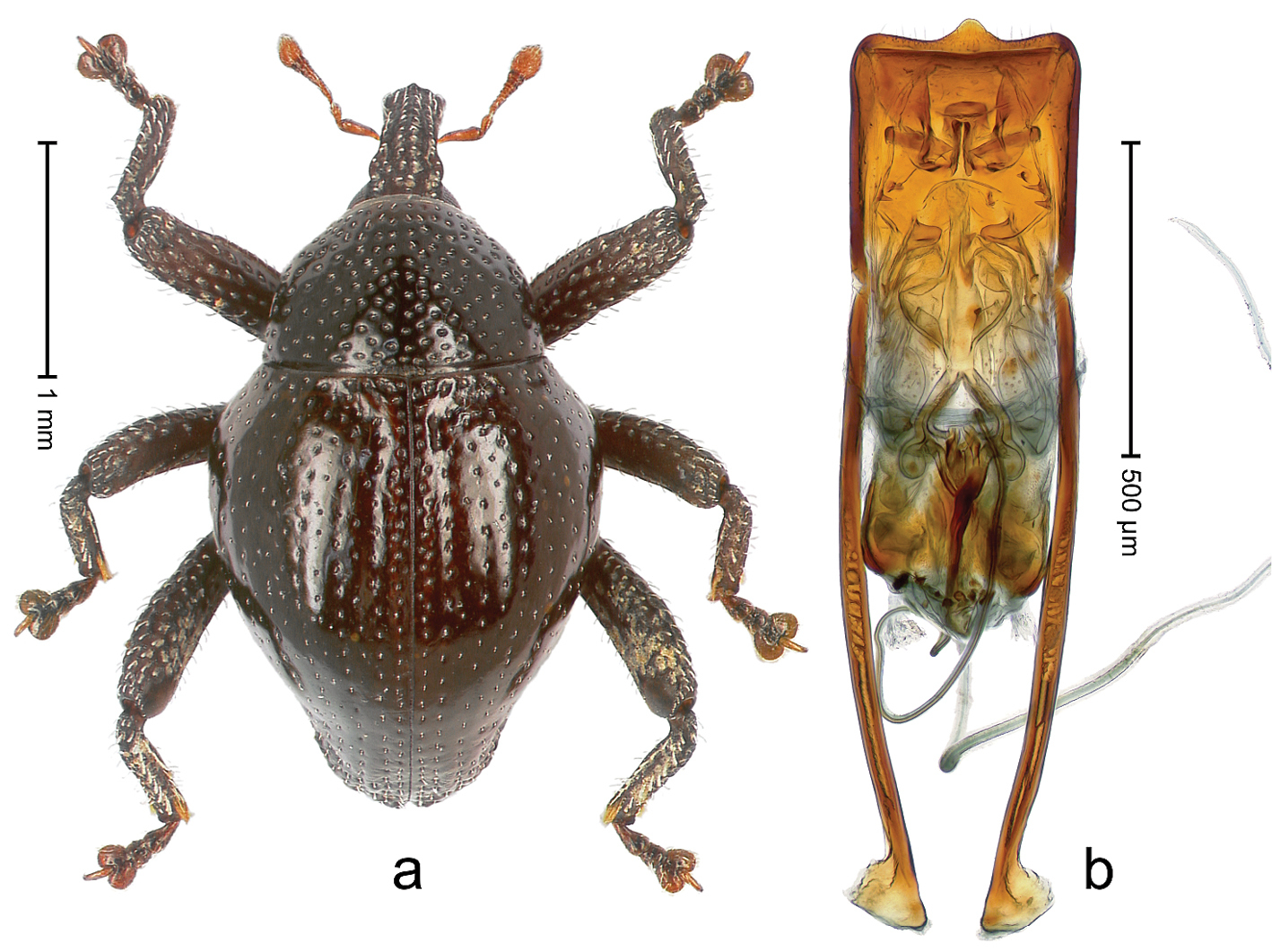

Scientific classification
- Kingdom: Animalia
- Phylum: Arthropoda
- Class: Insecta
- Order: Coleoptera
- Suborder: Polyphaga
- Infraorder: Cucujiformia
- Family: Curculionidae
- Genus: Trigonopterus
- Species: T. kalimantanensis

Binomial name
- Trigonopterus kalimantanensis Riedel, 2014

= Trigonopterus kalimantanensis =

Species of beetle

Trigonopterus kalimantanensis is a species of flightless weevil in the subfamily Cryptorhynchinae from Kalimantan (Borneo, Indonesia).

== Etymology ==
The specific name is derived from the Indonesian word for Borneo, Kalimantan.

== Description ==
Individuals measure 2.35–2.65 mm in length. General coloration is a dark rust-color, with a black pronotum and light rust-colored antennae.

== Range ==
The species is found around elevations of 190 metres (620 ft) in Tanjung Redeb, part of the Indonesian province of East Kalimantan.

== Phylogeny ==
T. kalimantanensis is part of the T. bornensis species group.
