= List of districts of East Kalimantan =

The province of East Kalimantan in Indonesia is divided into 10 regencies and cities which in turn are divided administratively into 105 districts, known as kecamatan. Each district have their own villages or subdistricts, rural ones are known as desa or kampung (the latter only in Berau, Mahakam Ulu and West Kutai), while urban ones are known as kelurahan.

The tables below are accompanied by regional codes (kode wilayah), and years of establishment, according to regional regulations (/ government regulations), decrees or other sources. Regarding the latter, many of them have no clear history regarding its legal formation. The 1969 book Monografi Daerah Propinsi Kalimantan Timur ("Regional Monograph of the Province of East Kalimantan") has a full list of 56 districts (excluding 13 districts of Bulungan, now part of North Kalimantan since 2012) and it is one of the oldest known lists of such kind, although this shortly predates the municipal annexations of 1969 by Samarinda and Balikpapan.

The districts of East Kalimantan, with the regency (or city) each falls into, are as follows:

== Balikpapan ==
Regional code	District name	Number of villages	Established
Regional code	District name	Urban	Established
64.71.06	Balikpapan Kota	5	2012
64.71.04	Central Balikpapan	6	
64.71.01	East Balikpapan	4	1996
64.71.03	North Balikpapan	6	1996
64.71.05	South Balikpapan	7	
64.71.02	West Balikpapan	6	
	TOTAL	34	1959

== Berau ==
Regional code	District name	District seat	Number of villages		Established
Regional code	District name	District seat	Rural	Urban	Established
64.03.12	Batu Putih	Batu Putih	7		2005
64.03.13	Biatan	Biatan Lempake	8		2005
64.03.08	Biduk-Biduk	Biduk-Biduk	6		1996
64.03.06	Gunung Tabur	Gunung Tabur	10	1	
64.03.01	Kelay	Sido Bangen	14		
64.03.11	Maratua	Maratua Teluk Harapan	14		2005
64.03.07	Pulau Derawan	Tanjung Batu	5		
64.03.03	Sambaliung	Sambaliung	13	1	
64.03.04	Segah	Tepian Buah	13		
64.03.10	Tabalar	Tubaan	6		2005
64.03.02	Talisayan	Talisayan	10		
64.03.05	Tanjung Redeb	Tanjung Redeb		6	
64.03.09	Teluk Bayur	Teluk Bayur	4	2	
	TOTALS		10	100	1959

== Bontang ==
Regional code	District name	District seat	Number of villages	Established
Regional code	District name	District seat	Urban	Established
64.74.01	North Bontang	Bontang Baru	6	1989
64.74.02	South Bontang	Tanjung Laut	6	1989
64.74.03	West Bontang	Kanaan	3	1999
	TOTAL		15	1999

== East Kutai ==
Regional code	District name	District seat	Number of villages		Established
Regional code	District name	District seat	Rural	Urban	Established
64.08.17	Batu Ampar	Batu Timbau	7		2005
64.08.09	Bengalon	Sepaso	11		1999
64.08.06	Busang	Long Lees	6		1999
64.08.10	Kaliorang	Bukit Makmur	7		1999
64.08.16	Karangan	Karangan Hilir	7		2005
64.08.15	Kaubun	Bumi Etam	8		2005
64.08.08	Kongbeng	Miau Baru	7		1999
64.08.18	Long Mesangat	Sumber Sari	7		2005
64.08.01	Muara Ancalong	Kelinjau Ilir	9		1923
64.08.03	Muara Bengkal	Muara Bengkal Ulu	7		1923
64.08.02	Muara Wahau	Muara Wahau	10		1923
64.08.04	North Sangatta	North Sangatta	3	1	2005
64.08.14	Rantau Pulung	Kebon Agung	9		2005
64.08.11	Sandaran	Manubar	9		1999
64.08.05	Sangkulirang	Benua Baru Ilir	15		1923
64.08.12	South Sangatta	South Sangatta	3	1	2005
64.08.07	Telen	Juk Ayaq	8		1999
64.08.13	Teluk Pandan	Teluk Pandan	6		2005
	TOTALS		139	2	1999

== Kutai Kartanegara ==
Regional code	District name	District seat	Number of villages		Established
Regional code	District name	District seat	Rural	Urban	Established
64.02.04	Anggana	Sungai Meriam	8		1960
64.02.10	Kembang Janggut	Kembang Janggut	11		
64.02.09	Kenohan	Kahala	9		
64.02.08	Kota Bangun	Kota Bangun Ulu	10		1923
64.02.19	Kota Bangun Darat	Kedang Ipil	11		2020
64.02.03	Loa Janan	Loa Janan Ulu	8		
64.02.02	Loa Kulu	Loh Sumber	15		
64.02.17	Marang Kayu	Sebuntal	11		1996
64.02.05	Muara Badak	Muara Badak Ulu	13		
64.02.14	Muara Jawa	Muara Jawa Ulu		8	
64.02.11	Muara Kaman	Muara Kaman Ulu	20		1923
64.02.01	Muara Muntai	Muara Muntai Ilir	13		1923
64.02.18	Muara Wis	Muara Wis	7		1996
64.02.13	Samboja	Kampung Lama	3	10	
64.02.15	Sanga-Sanga	Sanga-Sanga Dalam		5	1923
64.02.07	Sebulu	Sebulu Ilir	14		1964
64.02.12	Tabang	Sidomulyo	19		1923
64.02.06	Tenggarong	Melayu	2	12	1923
64.02.16	Tenggarong Seberang	Manunggal Jaya	18		1996
64.02.20	West Samboja	Tani Bakti	1	9	2020
	TOTALS		193	44	1959

== Mahakam Ulu ==
Regional code	District name	District seat	Number of villages	Established
Regional code	District name	District seat	Rural	Established
64.11.03	Laham	Laham	5	2003
64.11.04	Long Apari	Tiong Ohang	10	
64.11.01	Long Bagun	Ujoh Bilang	11	
64.11.02	Long Hubung	Long Hubung	11	1996
64.11.05	Long Pahangai	Long Pahangai	13	
	TOTAL		50	2013

== Paser ==
Regional code	District name	District seat	Number of villages		Established
Regional code	District name	District seat	Rural	Urban	Established
64.01.09	Batu Engau	Kerang	13		200x
64.01.01	Batu Sopang	Batu Kajang	9		
64.01.05	Kuaro	Kuaro	12	1	
64.01.06	Long Ikis	Long Ikis	25	1	
64.01.08	Long Kali	Long Kali	22	1	
64.01.07	Muara Komam	Muara Komam	12	1	
64.01.10	Muara Samu	Muser	9		2003
64.01.03	Paser Belengkong	Paser Belengkong	15		
64.01.04	Tanah Grogot	Tanah Grogot	15	1	
64.01.02	Tanjung Harapan	Tanjung Aru	7		
	TOTALS		139	5	1959

== Penajam North Paser ==
Regional code	District name	District seat	Number of villages		Established
Regional code	District name	District seat	Rural	Urban	Established
64.09.03	Babulu	Babulu Darat	12		1996
64.09.01	Penajam	Nipah-Nipah	4	19	
64.09.04	Sepaku	Tengin Baru	11	4	1996
64.09.02	Waru	Waru	3	1	
	TOTALS		30	24	2002

== Samarinda ==
Regional code	District name	District seat	Number of villages	Established
Regional code	District name	District seat	Urban	Established
64.72.10	Loa Janan Ilir	Simpang Tiga	5	2010
64.72.05	North Samarinda	Lempake	8	1996
64.72.01	Palaran	Rawa Makmur	5	1969
64.72.04	Samarinda Ilir	Sidomulyo	5	196x
64.72.09	Samarinda Kota	Sungai Pinang Luar	5	2010
64.72.02	Samarinda Seberang	Baqa	6	1923
64.72.03	Samarinda Ulu	Air Putih	8	196x
64.72.07	Sambutan	Sambutan	5	2010
64.72.06	Sungai Kunjang	Loa Bakung	7	1996
64.72.08	Sungai Pinang	Sungai Pinang Dalam	5	2010
	TOTAL		59	1959

== West Kutai ==
Regional code	District name	District seat	Number of villages		Established
Regional code	District name	District seat	Rural	Urban	Established
64.07.07	Barong Tongkok	Barong Tongkok	19	2	
64.07.14	Bentian Besar	Dilang Puti	9		1999
64.07.12	Bongan	Muara Kendang	16		
64.07.08	Damai	Damai Kota	17		
64.07.11	Jempang	Tanjung Isuy	12		
64.07.15	Linggang Bigung	Linggang Bigung	11		1999
64.07.05	Long Iram	Long Iram Kota	11		
64.07.06	Melak	Melak Ilir	4	2	
64.07.18	Mook Manaar Bulatn	Gunung Rampah	16		2003
64.07.09	Muara Lawa	Muara Lawa	8		
64.07.10	Muara Pahu	Tanjung Laor	12		
64.07.16	Nyuatan	Dempar	10		2003
64.07.13	Penyinggahan	Penyinggahan Ilir	6		1965
64.07.20	Sekolaq Darat	Sekolaq Darat	8		2003
64.07.17	Siluq Ngurai	Muhur	16		2003
64.07.19	Tering	Tering Lama	15		2003
	TOTALS		190	4	1999
