= Biatan =

- District
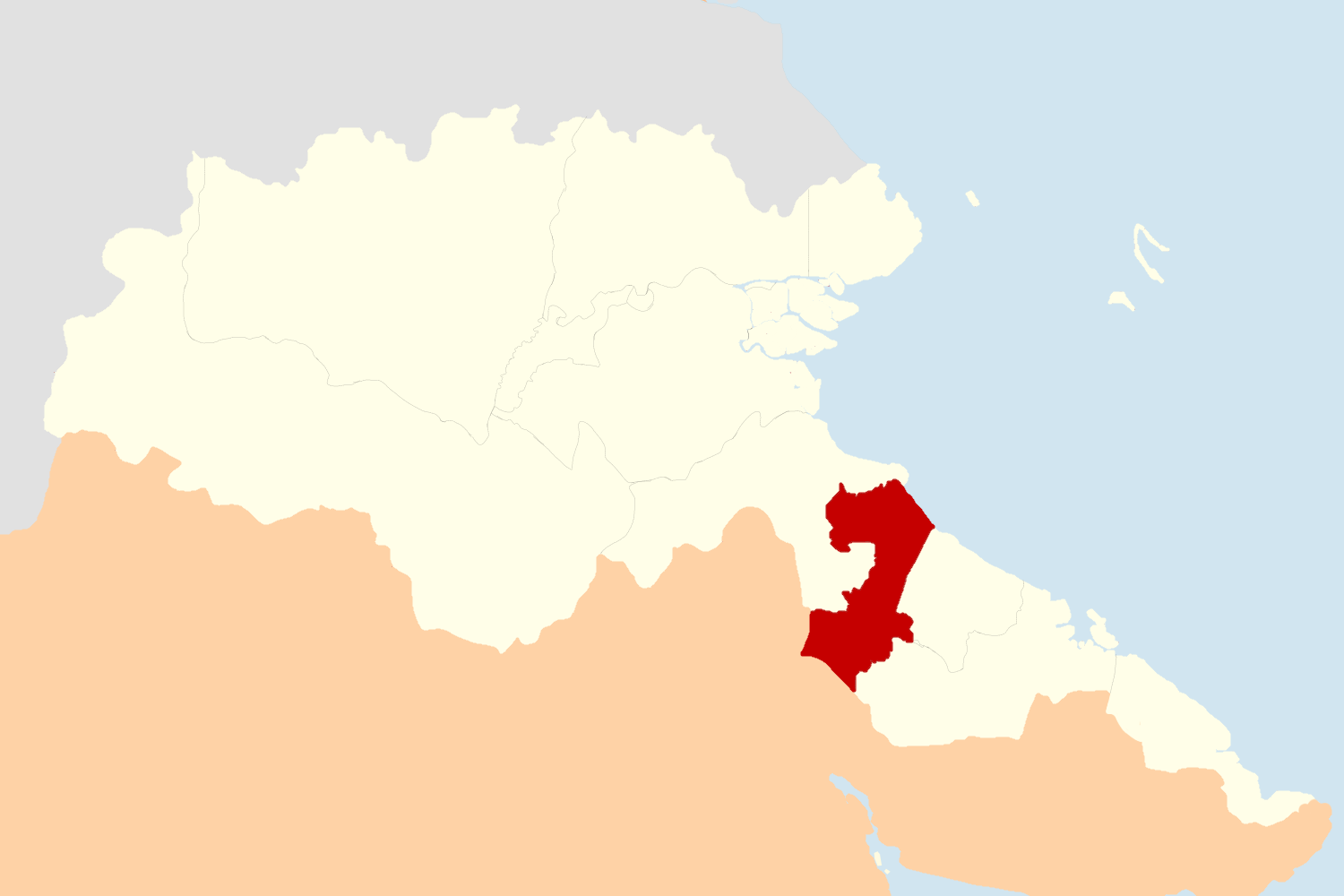
- Location within Berau Regency

- Location within East Kalimantan Location within Kalimantan Location within Indonesia
- Coordinates: 1°40′24.8484″N 118°0′53.4636″E
- Country: Indonesia
- Province: East Kalimantan
- Regency: Berau
- District seat: Biatan Lempake

Area
  - Total: 1,192.03 km^{2} (460.25 sq mi)

Population (2024)
  - Total: 10,102
  - Density: 8.4746/km^{2} (21.949/sq mi)

Biatan is a district (kecamatan) in Berau Regency, East Kalimantan, Indonesia. In the mid 2024 estimate, it was inhabited by 10,102 people, and has a total area of 1,192.03 km^{2}.

== Geography ==
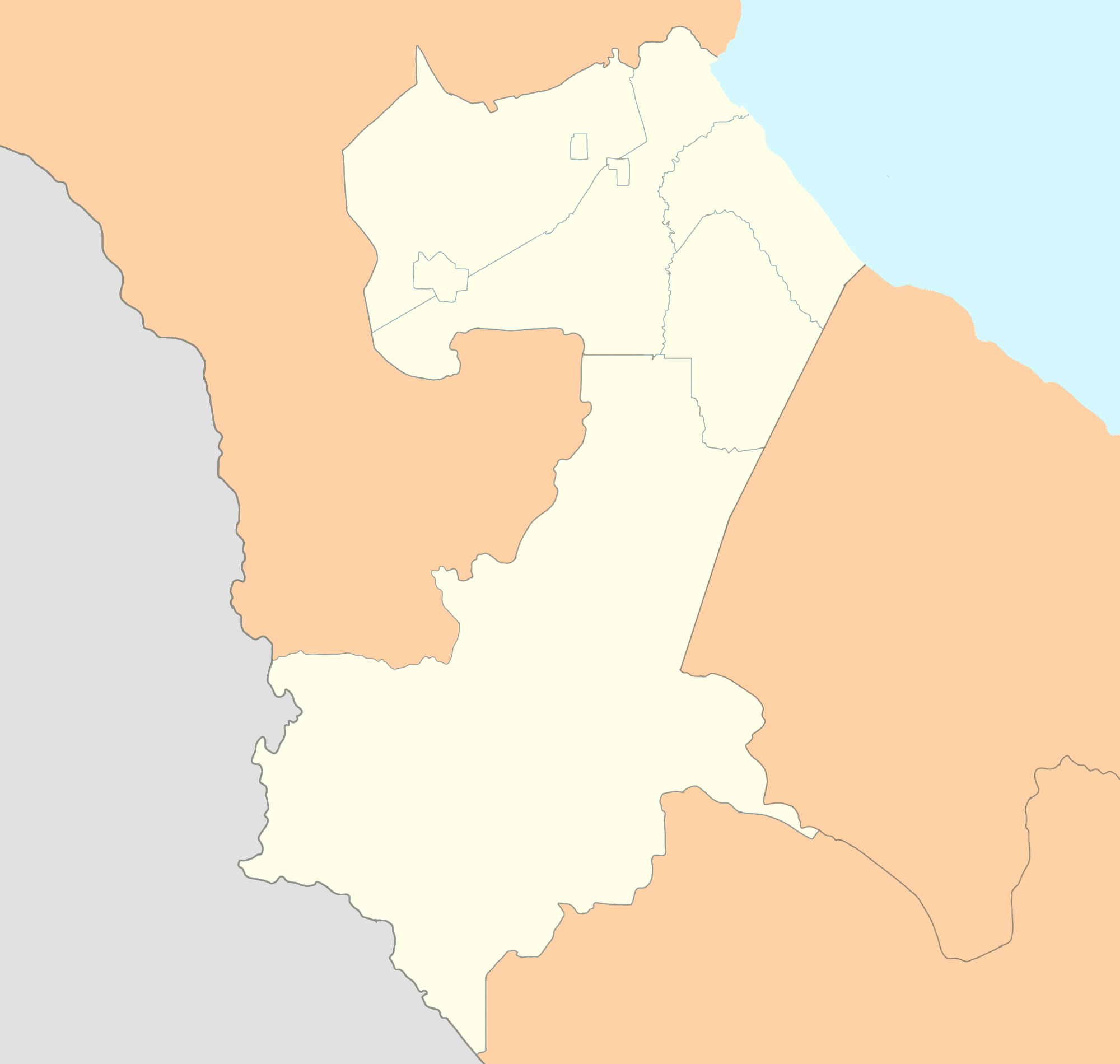
Map of village area divisions in Biatan district

Biatan consists of eight villages (desa):

- Biatan Ulu
- Biatan Ilir
- Karangan
- Biatan Lempake
- Manunggal Jaya
- Biatan Bapinang
- Biatan Baru
- Bukit Makmur Jaya
