= Tabalar =

- District
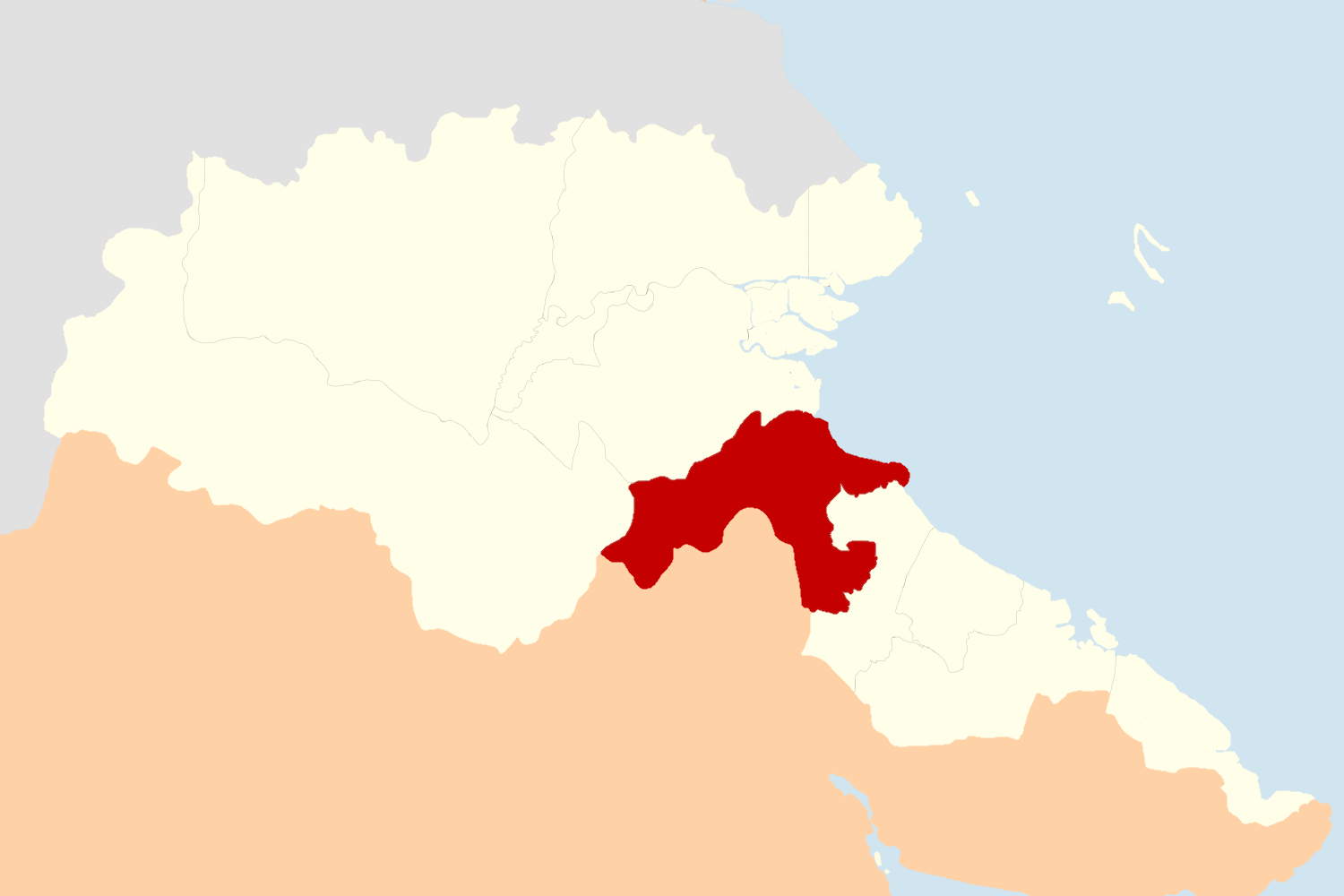
- Location within Berau Regency

- Location within East Kalimantan Location within Kalimantan Location within Indonesia
- Coordinates: 1°48′34.6644″N 117°52′13.4184″E
- Country: Indonesia
- Province: East Kalimantan
- Regency: Berau
- District seat: Tubaan

Area
  - Total: 1,837.34 km^{2} (709.40 sq mi)

Population (2024)
  - Total: 8,470
  - Density: 4.61/km^{2} (11.9/sq mi)

Tabalar (formerly known as Tubaan until 15 February 2005) is a district (kecamatan) in Berau Regency, East Kalimantan, Indonesia. In the mid 2024 estimate, it was inhabited by 8,470 people, and has a total area of 1,837.34 km^{2}.

== Geography ==
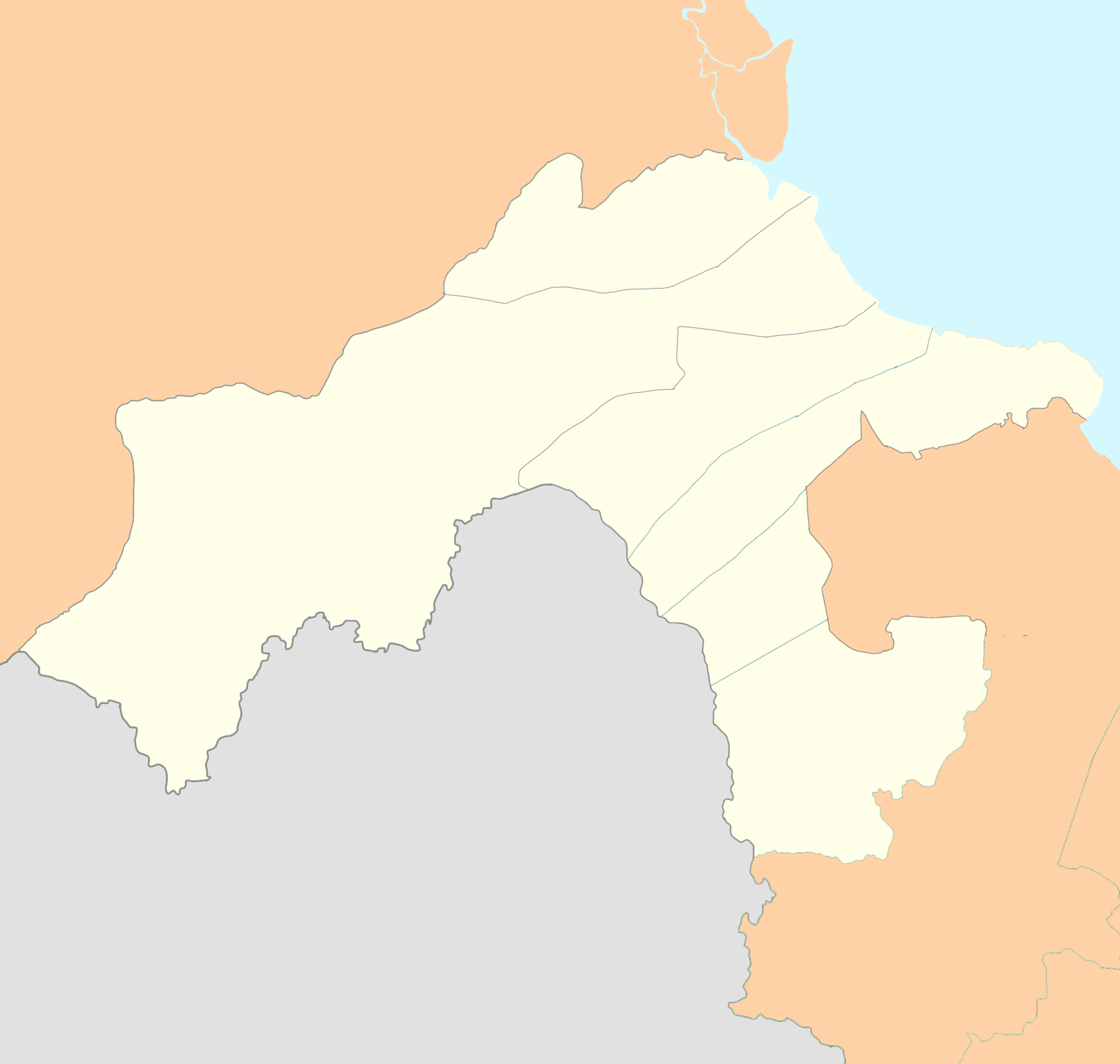
Map of village area divisions in Tabalar district

Tabalar consists of six villages:

- Buyung-Buyung (Radak)
- Harapan Maju
- Semurut
- Tabalar Muara
- Tabalar Ulu
- Tubaan
