= Sungai Pinang, Samarinda =

District of Samarinda, East Kalimantan

Sungai Pinang
- District
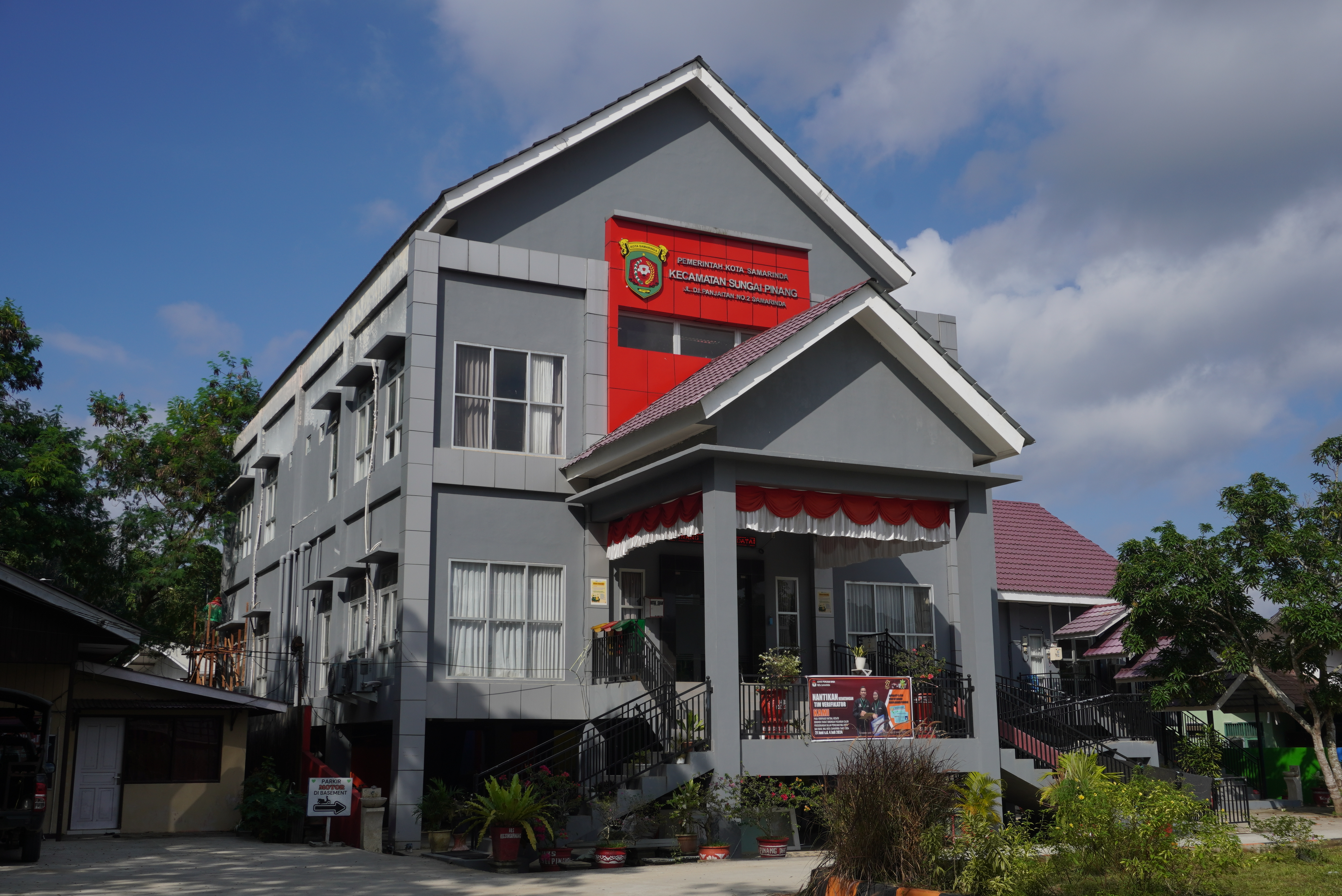
- Sungai Pinang District Office, Samarinda
- Interactive map of Sungai Pinang
- Location in Kalimantan and Indonesia Sungai Pinang (Indonesia)
- Coordinates: 0°22′47.70858″S 117°6′45.36918″E
- Country: Indonesia
- Province: East Kalimantan
- Regency: Samarinda
- Established: 14 December 2010
- District seat: Sungai Pinang Dalam

Government
  - District head (Camat): Siti Hasanah

Area
  - Total: 34.16 km^{2} (13.19 sq mi)

Population (2023)
  - Total: 110,473
  - Density: 3,234/km^{2} (8,376/sq mi)
- Time zone: UTC+8 (ICT)
- Postal code: 75117 - 75119
- Regional code: 64.72.08
- Villages: 5

Sungai Pinang (Indonesian pronunciation: [ˌsuŋai̯ ˈpinaŋ], lit. 'areca nut river') is a district of Samarinda, East Kalimantan, Indonesia. As of 2023, it was inhabited by 110,473 people, and currently has a total area of 34.16 km^{2}. Its district seat is located at the village of Sungai Pinang Dalam.

The district was formed on 14 December 2010 from the southern parts of North Samarinda.

== Governance ==
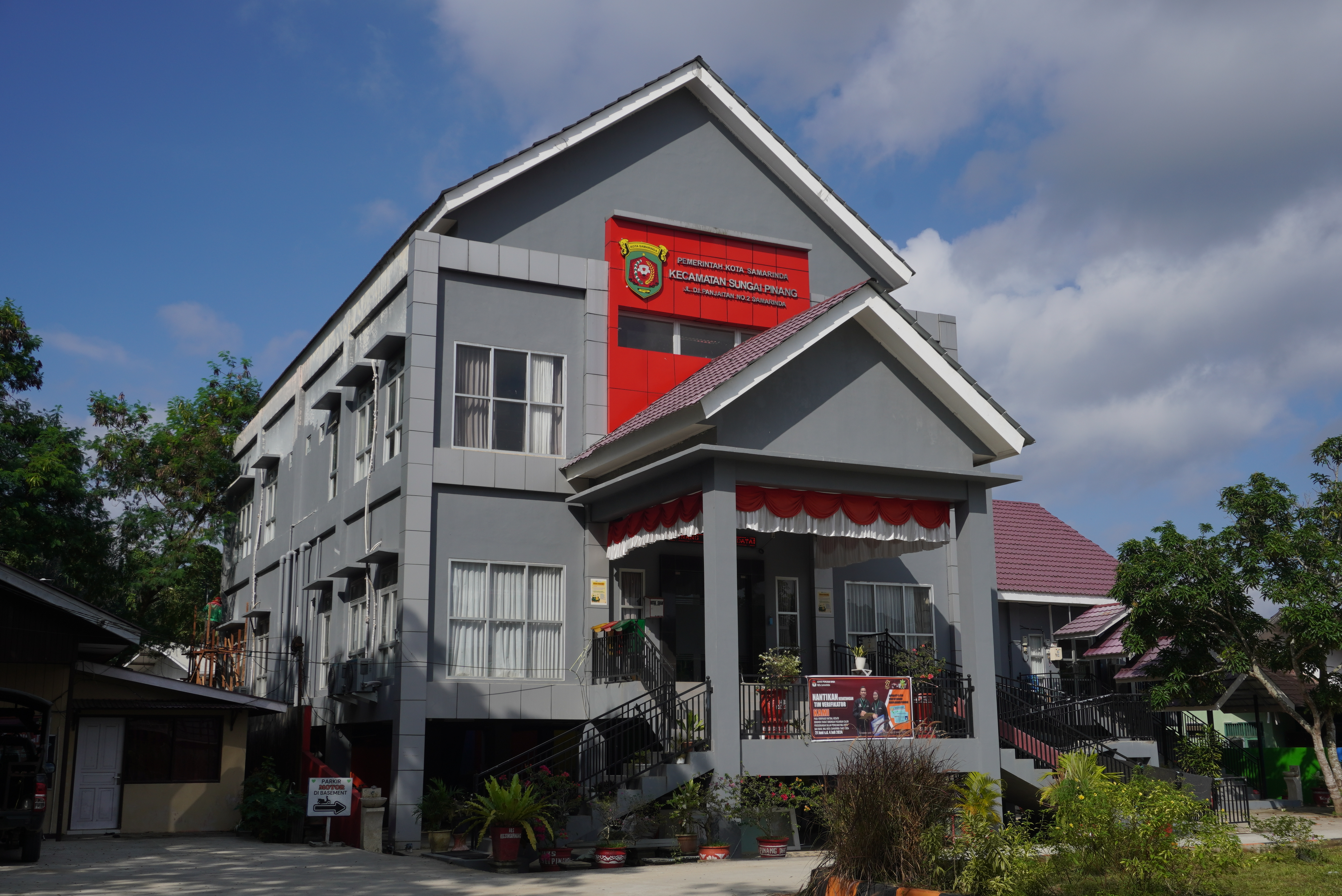
District head office at Sungai Pinang Dalam, Sungai Pinang.

=== Villages ===
Sungai Pinang is divided into the following 5 villages (kelurahan):

Regional code (Kode wilayah)	Name	Area (km^{2})	Population (2023)	RT (rukun tetangga)
64.72.08.1001	Temindung Permai	1.30	17,153	39
64.72.08.1002	Sungai Pinang Dalam	8.97	47,780	114
64.72.08.1003	Gunung Lingai	4.36	12,509	23
64.72.08.1004	Mugirejo	10.94	25,183	43
64.72.08.1005	Bandara	8.59	7,848	29
	Totals	34.16	110,473	248

The villages of Bandara, Gunung Lingai, and Mugirejo were created on 22 February 2006, respectively from parts of Pelita (now transferred to Samarinda Ilir in 2010), Temindung Permai, and Sungai Pinang Dalam.
