= Budaya Pampang =

Village in North Samarinda, Samarinda, East Kalimantan

- Urban village
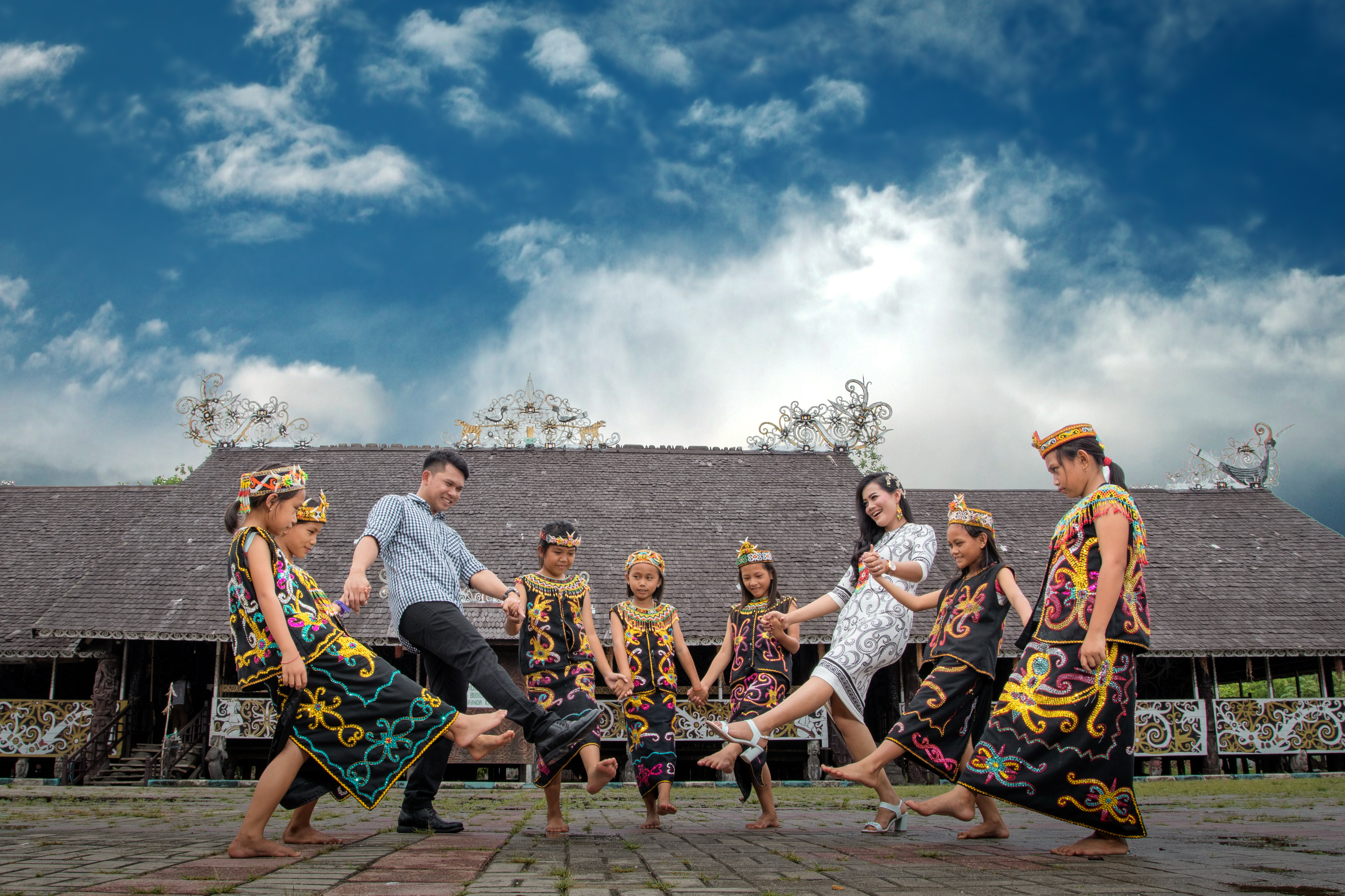
- People dancing together at Pamung Tawai lamin
- Interactive map of Budaya Pampang
- Location Budaya Pampang (Indonesia)
- Coordinates: 0°23′19.23443″S 117°13′37.43238″E
- Country: Indonesia
- Province: East Kalimantan
- City: Samarinda
- District: North Samarinda
- Established: 12 August 2014

Area
  - Total: 26.77 km^{2} (10.34 sq mi)

Population (2023)
  - Total: 1,654
  - Density: 61.79/km^{2} (160.0/sq mi)
- Time zone: UTC+8 (ICT)
- Regional code: 64.72.05.1014

Budaya Pampang (Indonesian pronunciation: [buˌdaja ˈpampaŋ], lit. 'Pampang cultural [village]'), or simply known as Pampang, is an urban village (kelurahan) within the district of North Samarinda, Samarinda, East Kalimantan, Indonesia. As of 2023, it was inhabited by 1,654 people, and currently has the total area of 26.77 km^{2}. Budaya Pampang consists of 6 rukun tetangga (pillar of neighbours).

Located 27.8 kilometers away from the downtowns of Samarinda, the village is notable for being an ethnic enclave inhabited by Kenyah people within the city. Despite its title as a 'cultural village', it is in fact an urban village (kelurahan) instead of rural one (desa).

== History ==
The majority of its inhabitants, Kenyah subgroup of Dayaks, according to traditional elder Simson Iman, had migrated from present-day Malinau and West Kutai since 1960s, after rejecting to join the newly-formed country of Malaysia. Budaya Pampang is home to Pamung Tawai Traditional Lamin, being constructed more than 50 years ago and originally inhabited by 80 families. The building has been rehabilitated once.

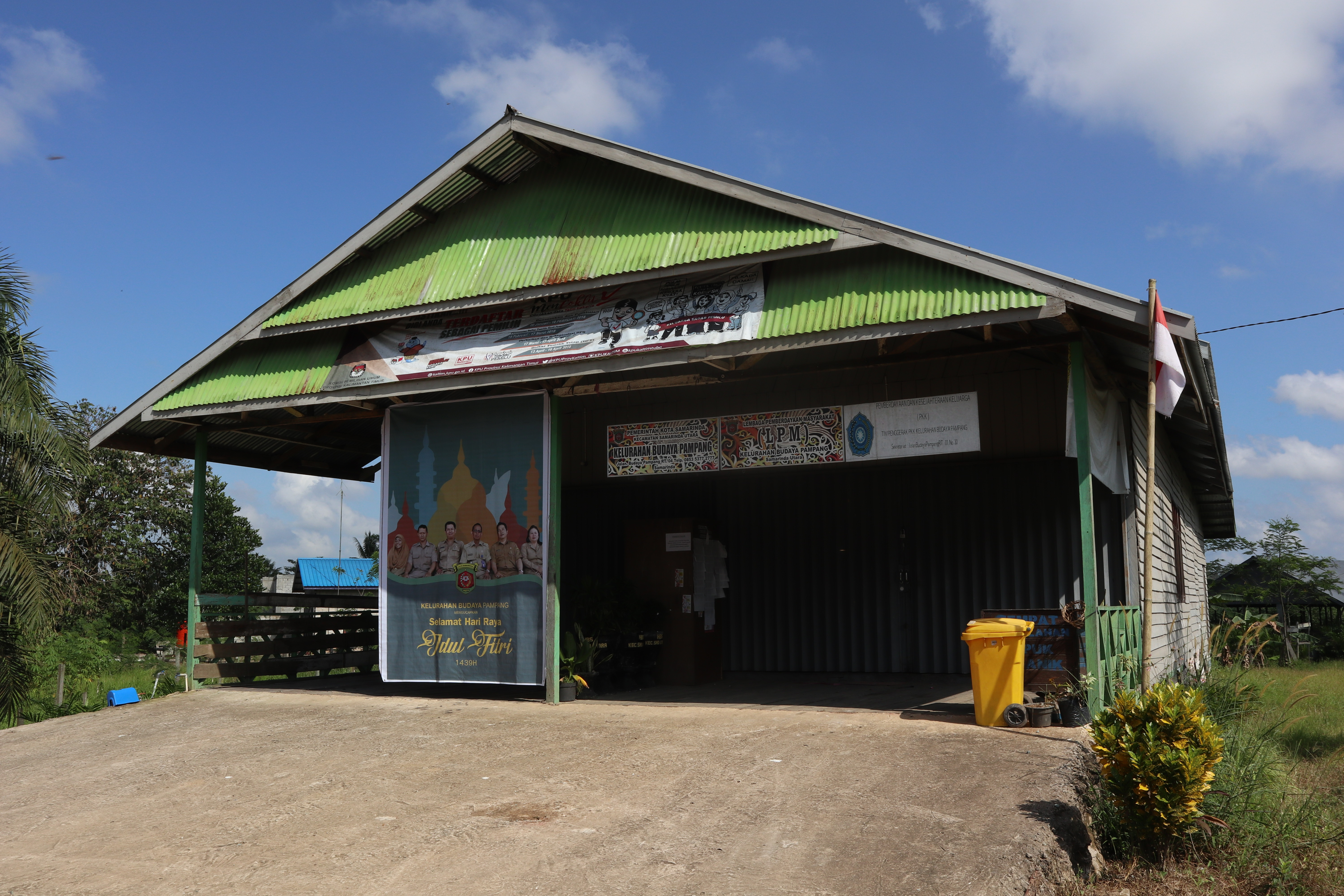
Village head's office

The site has been declared by East Kalimantan government as a cultural village (desa budaya) since 1991. Budaya Pampang came to be formally established as an urban village, after being separated from Sungai Siring on 12 August 2014, while its formation was finally inaugurated in a festival during 7–11 January 2015.

== Demographics ==
Historical population
Year	Pop.	±%
2016	1,308	—
2017	1,326	+1.4%
2018	1,032	−22.2%
2019	1,041	+0.9%
2020	1,405	+35.0%
2021	1,557	+10.8%
2022	1,599	+2.7%
2023	1,654	+3.4%
Source: Badan Pusat Statistik 2018–2024. Before its inauguration in 2015, Budaya Pampang was still part of Sungai Siring.

As of 2023, Budaya Pampang was populated by 1,654 people, consistently making it the least populated urban village in North Samarinda.

== Culture ==
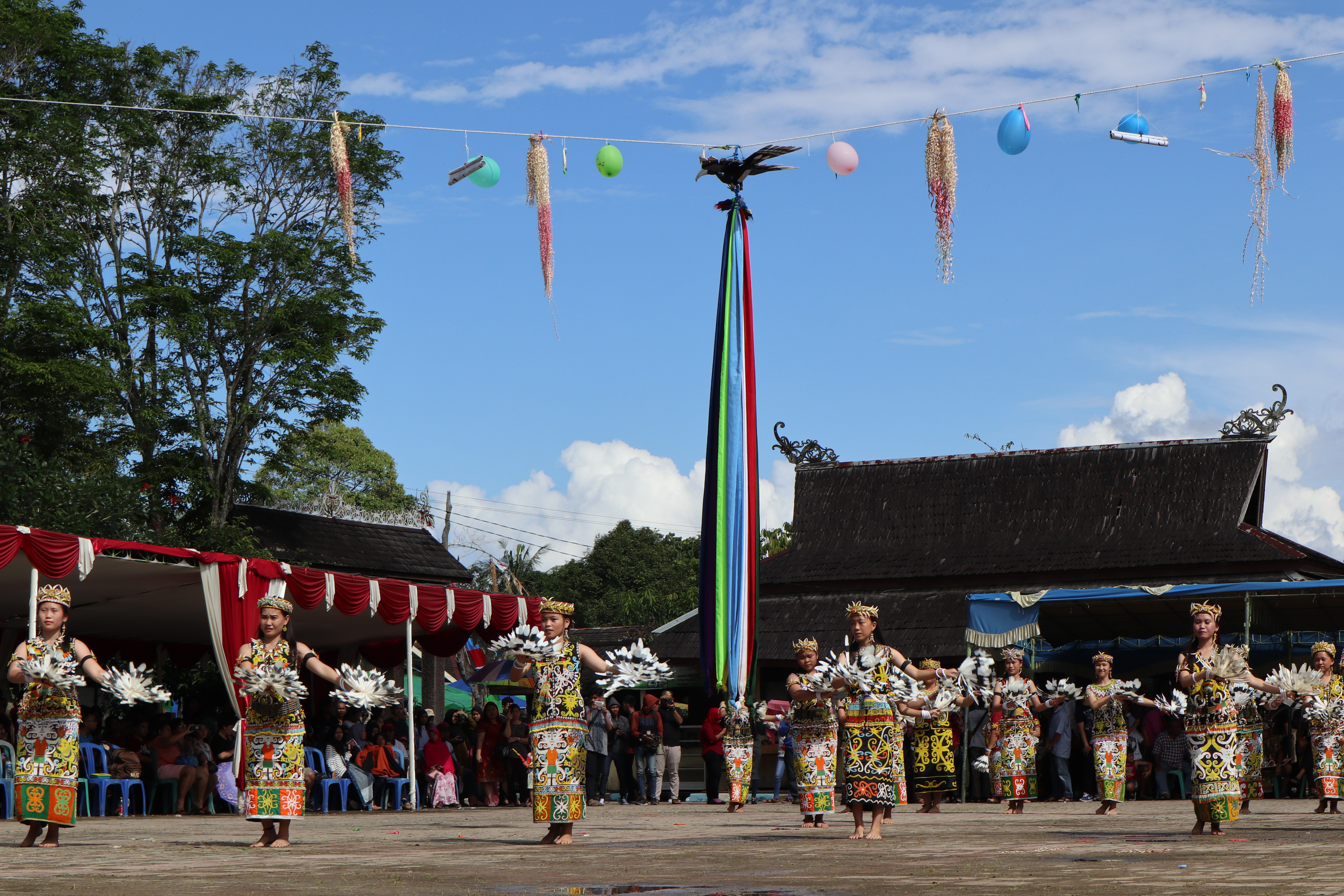
Enggang Terbang dance in June 2018

Due to its Kenyah demographic, the village's culture is heavily drawn from the ethnic group. Each year in June, Budaya Pampang holds Pelas Tahun since 1999, a harvest festival mainly featuring various dances including Lemimpa and Udo' Aban, but also traditional sporting competitions.
