= Biduk-Biduk =

- District
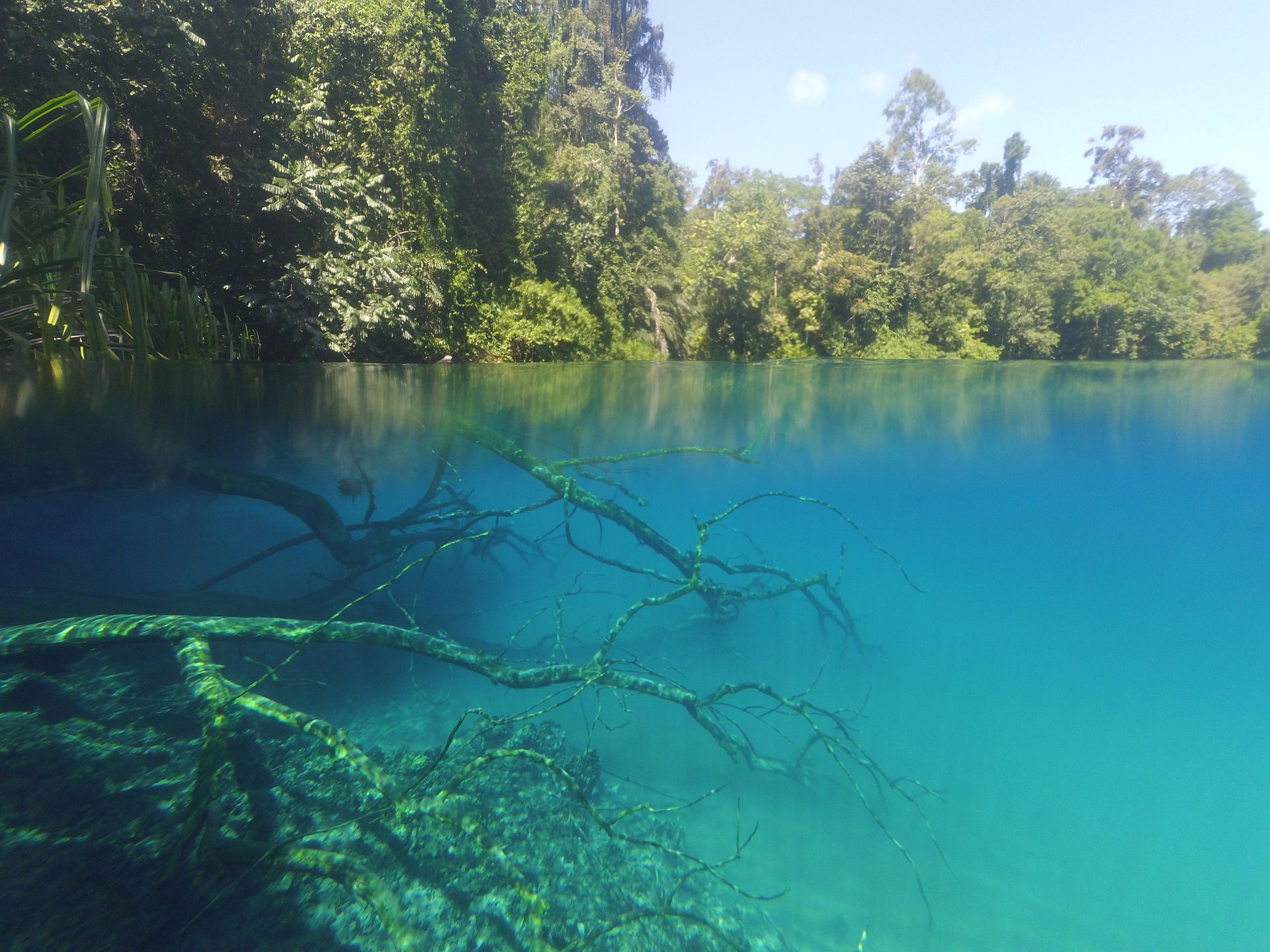
- Labuan Cermin Lake

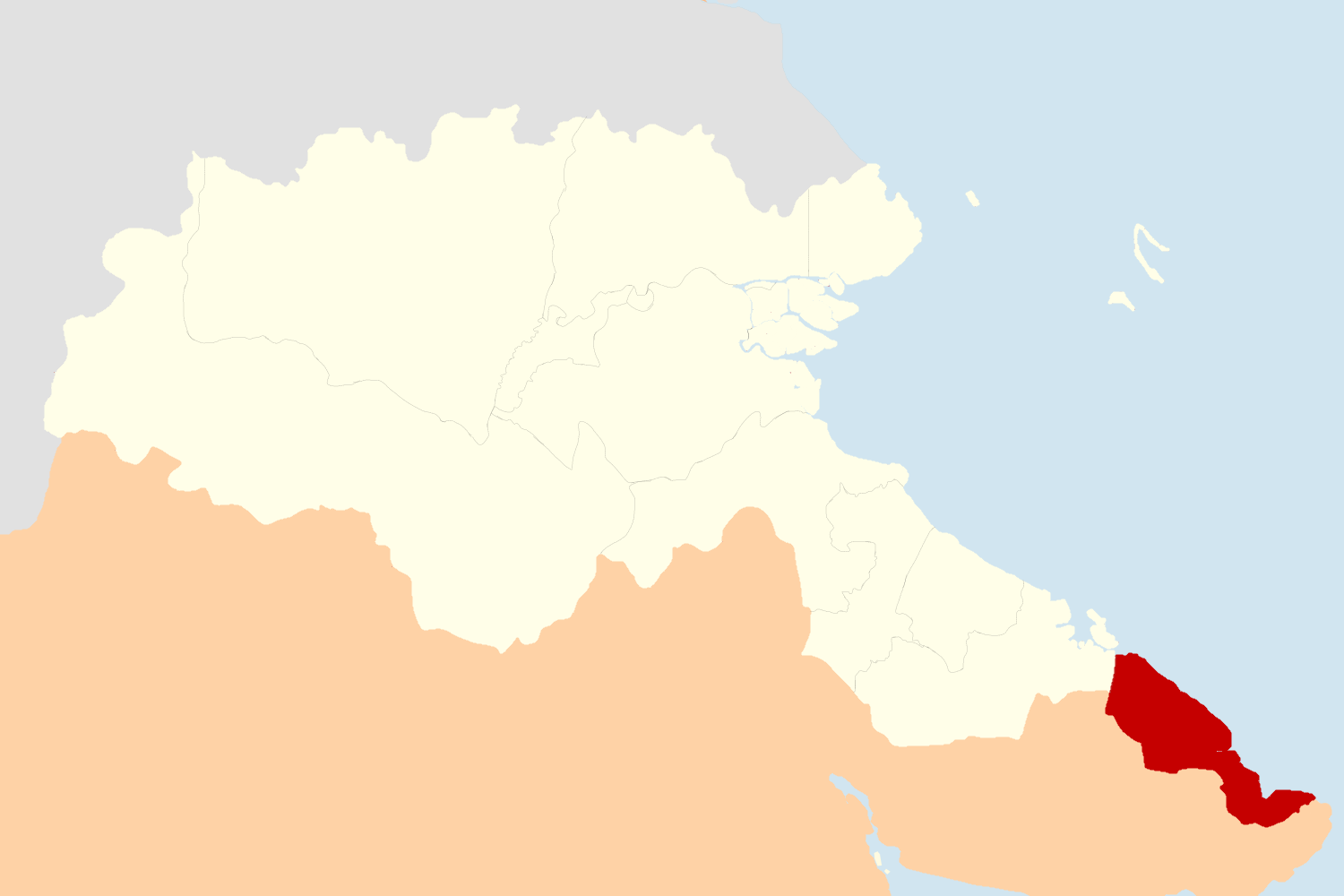
- Location within Berau Regency

- Location within East Kalimantan Location within Kalimantan Location within Indonesia
- Coordinates: 1°14′56.6556″N 118°42′46.8864″E
- Country: Indonesia
- Province: East Kalimantan
- Regency: Berau
- District seat: Biduk-Biduk

Area
  - Total: 2,429.97 km^{2} (938.22 sq mi)

Population (2024)
  - Total: 8,140
  - Density: 3.35/km^{2} (8.68/sq mi)

Biduk-Biduk is a district (kecamatan) in Berau Regency, East Kalimantan, Indonesia. In the mid 2024 Estimate, it was inhabited by 8,140 people, and has a total area of 2,429.97 km^{2}.

== History ==
Biduk-Biduk was established on 11 June 1996, after being split off from the eastern part of Talisayan district.

== Geography ==
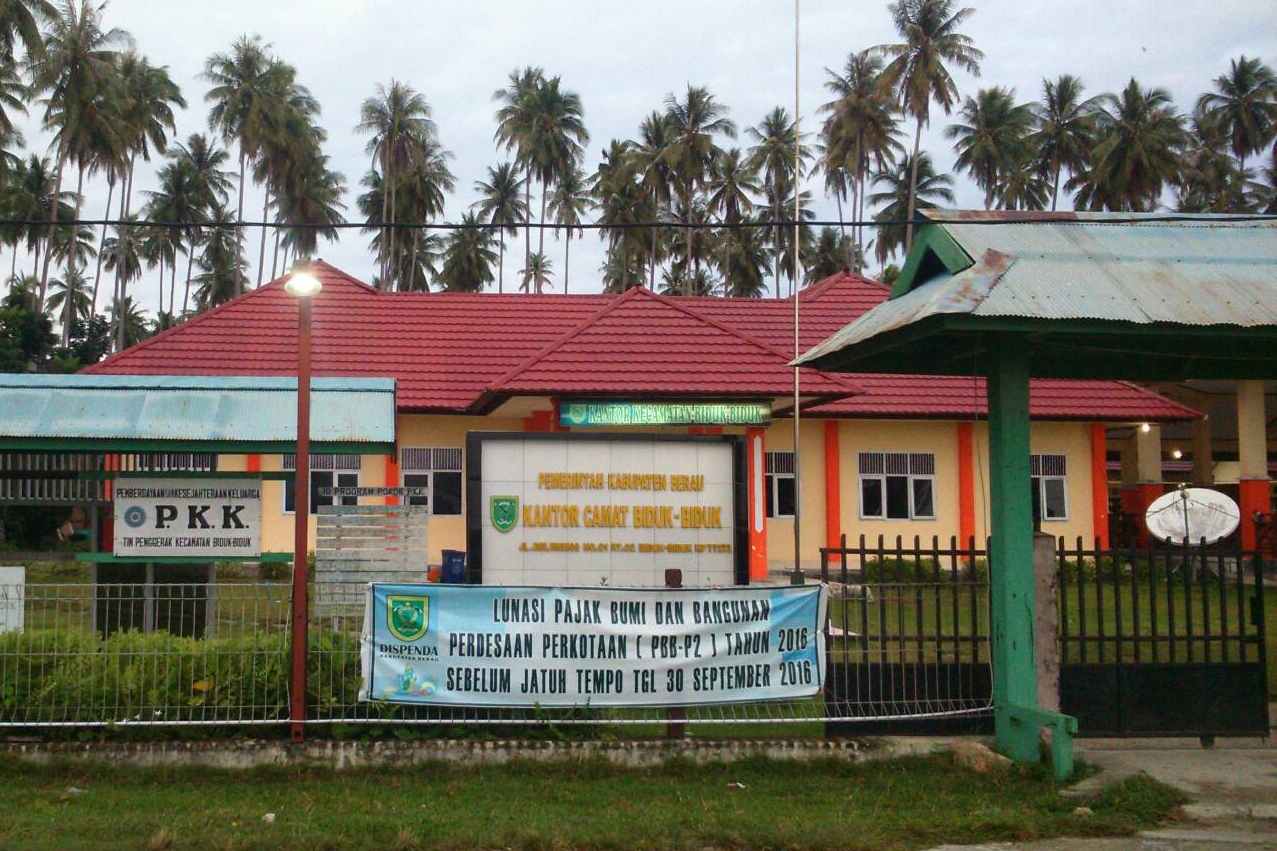
Biduk-Biduk District office

Biduk Biduk consists of six villages:

- Biduk-Biduk
- Giring-Giring
- Pantai Harapan
- Tanjung Prepat
- Teluk Sulaiman (Sulaiman Bay)
- Teluk Sumbang (Sumbang Bay)
