= Fatuleu =

- District
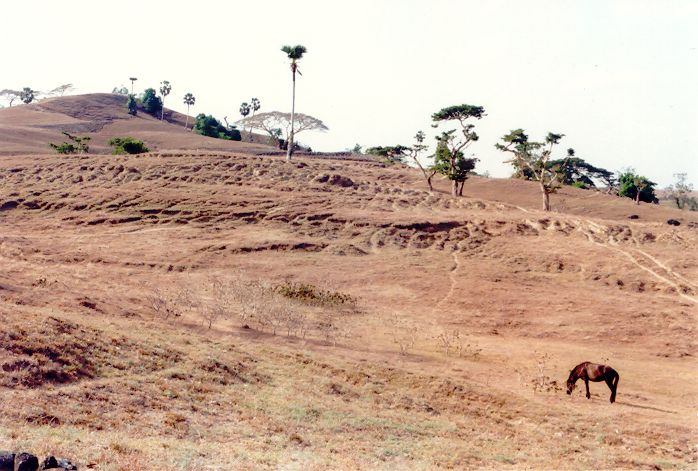
- Landscape near Camplong in the dry season

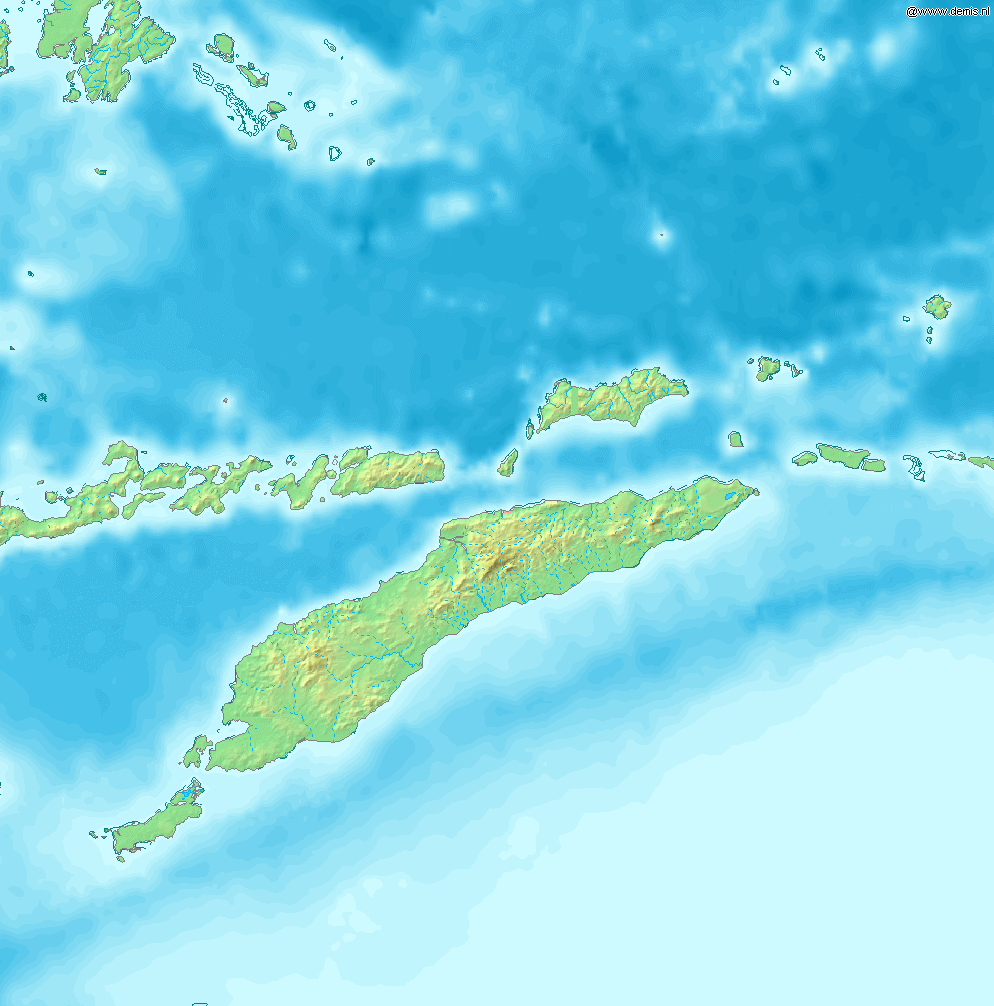
- Location of Fatuleu Fatuleu (Indonesia)
- Coordinates: 10°02′S 123°55′E
- Country: Indonesia
- Province: East Nusa Tenggara
- Regency: Kupang
- Capital: Camplong

Government
  - Camat: Hendra Mooy

Area
  - Total: 351.52 km^{2} (135.72 sq mi)

Population (2010 Census)
  - Total: 23,007
  - Estimate (2023): 28,629
  - Density: 65.450/km^{2} (169.51/sq mi)
- Time zone: UTC+8 (WITA)
- Postal code: 85363

Fatuleu is a district in Kupang Regency in the Indonesian province of East Nusa Tenggara. It is located in West Timor about 40 kilometres (25 mi) northeast of the city of Kupang on the highway to Soe. It is named after the 1,108-metre-high (3,635 ft) mountain of Fatuleu (Uab Meto: fatu l'eu, "sacred cliff"), a local landmark located in the neighbouring district of Fatuleu Tengah. Its headquarters are located in the village of Camplong, formerly known as Tjamplong.

== Geography ==
The district of Fatuleu is located in the hilly interior of West Timor. It borders the districts of Takari to the northeast, Fatuleu Tengah to the northwest, Kupang Timur to the west, Amabi Oefeto to the south, and Amabi Oefeto Timur to the southeast. The Mina River separates the easternmost portion of Fatuleu from the districts of Batu Putih and Amanuban Selatan in South Central Timor Regency. Fatuleu has a tropical savanna climate with the rainy season typically lasting from November to March. Camplong Nature Recreation Park protects 696.6 hectares (1,721 acres) of temperate forest within the district.

== History ==
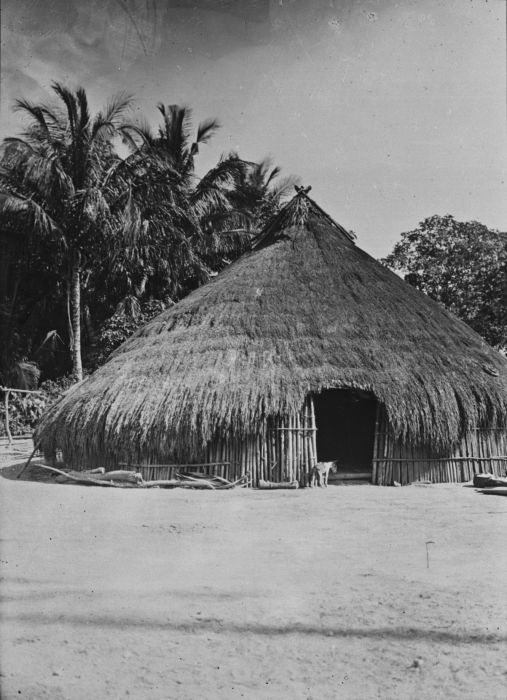
Hut in Tjamplong (now Camplong), 1921.

In the 19th century, the territory of what is now Fatuleu belonged to the realm of Sonbai Besar. After invading the Sonbai stronghold of Kauniki in late 1905 and capturing the final Sonbai ruler Sobe Sonbai III in February 1906, the Dutch established the landschap of Fatuleu in 1912, which united the five communities of Takaib, Manubait, Benu, Tefnai, and Kauniki.

After Indonesian independence, Fatuleu became part of Kupang Regency when it was established in 1958. The district of Fatuleu attained its present borders in 2005, when the subdistricts of Nuataus and Poto were split off to form the district of Fatuleu Barat (West Fatuleu), and Nonbaun, Nunsaen and Oelbiteno were split off to form the district of Fatuleu Tengah (Central Fatuleu).

== Subdivisions ==
Fatuleu is administratively subdivided into the village (kelurahan) of Camplong I and the subdistricts (desa) of Camplong II, Ekateta, Kiuoni, Kuimasi, Naunu, Oebola, Oebola Dalam, Sillu, and Tolnaku.

== Demographics ==
In the 2010 Indonesian census, Fatuleu recorded a population of 23,007 inhabitants. The population had grown to 28,629 as of the most recent estimate in 2023.
