= Talisayan, Berau =

Talisayan
- District
- Interactive map of Talisayan
- Location within East Kalimantan Location within Kalimantan Location within Indonesia
- Coordinates: 1°36′12.0056″N 118°10′37.392″E
- Country: Indonesia
- Province: East Kalimantan
- Regency: Berau
- District seat: Talisayan

Area
  - Total: 1,621.57 km^{2} (626.09 sq mi)

Population (2022)
  - Total: 15,326
  - Density: 9.4513/km^{2} (24.479/sq mi)

Talisayan is a district (kecamatan) in Berau Regency, East Kalimantan, Indonesia. As of 2022, it was inhabited by 15,326 people, and has a total area of 1,621.57 km^{2}. Its district seat is located at the village of Talisayan.

== Geography ==
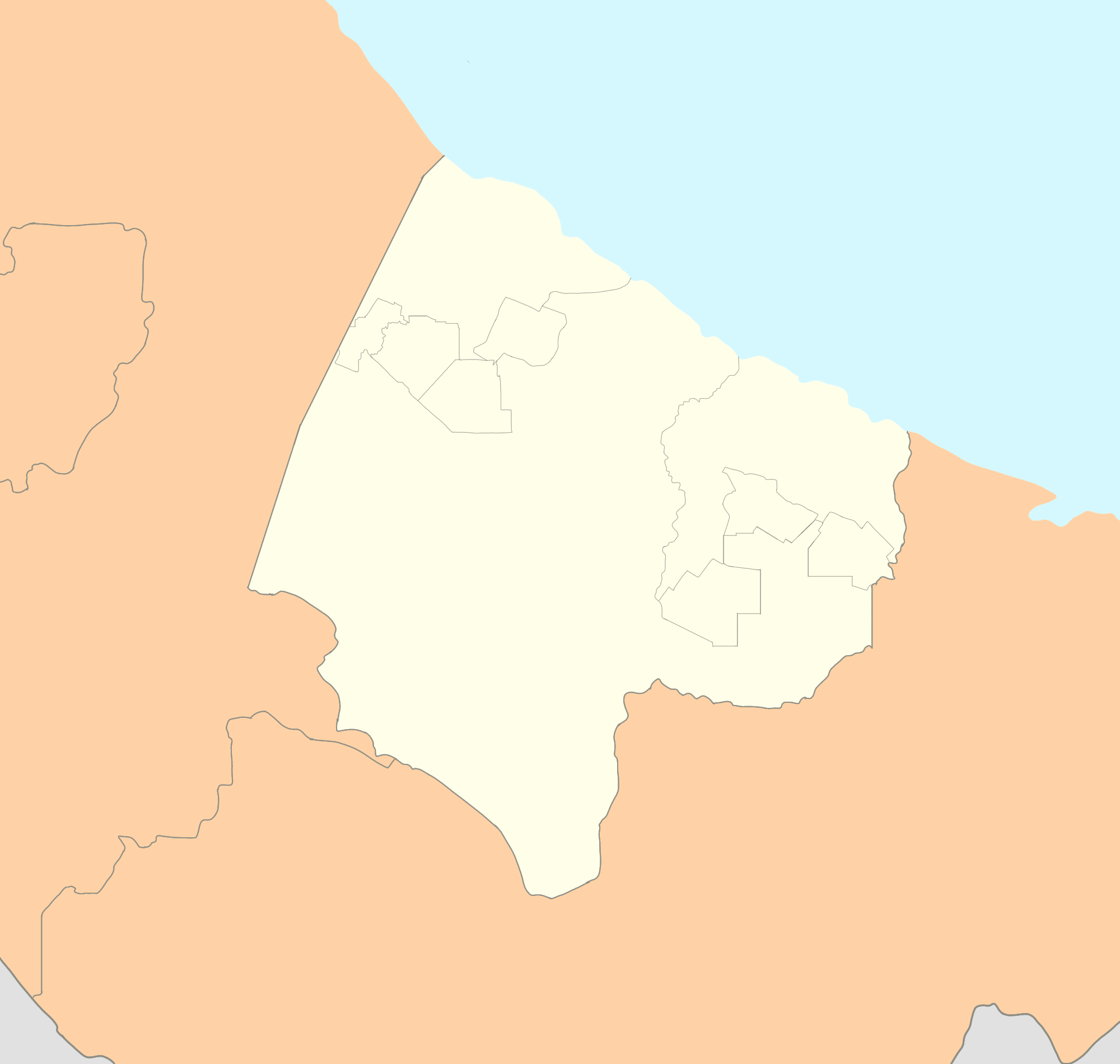
Map of village area divisions in Talisayan district

Talisayan consists of ten villages (desa):

- Talisayan
- Dumaring
- Capuak
- Bumi Jaya
- Tunggal Bumi
- Campur Sari
- Suka Murya
- Purnasari Jaya
- Eka Sapta
- Sumber Mulya
