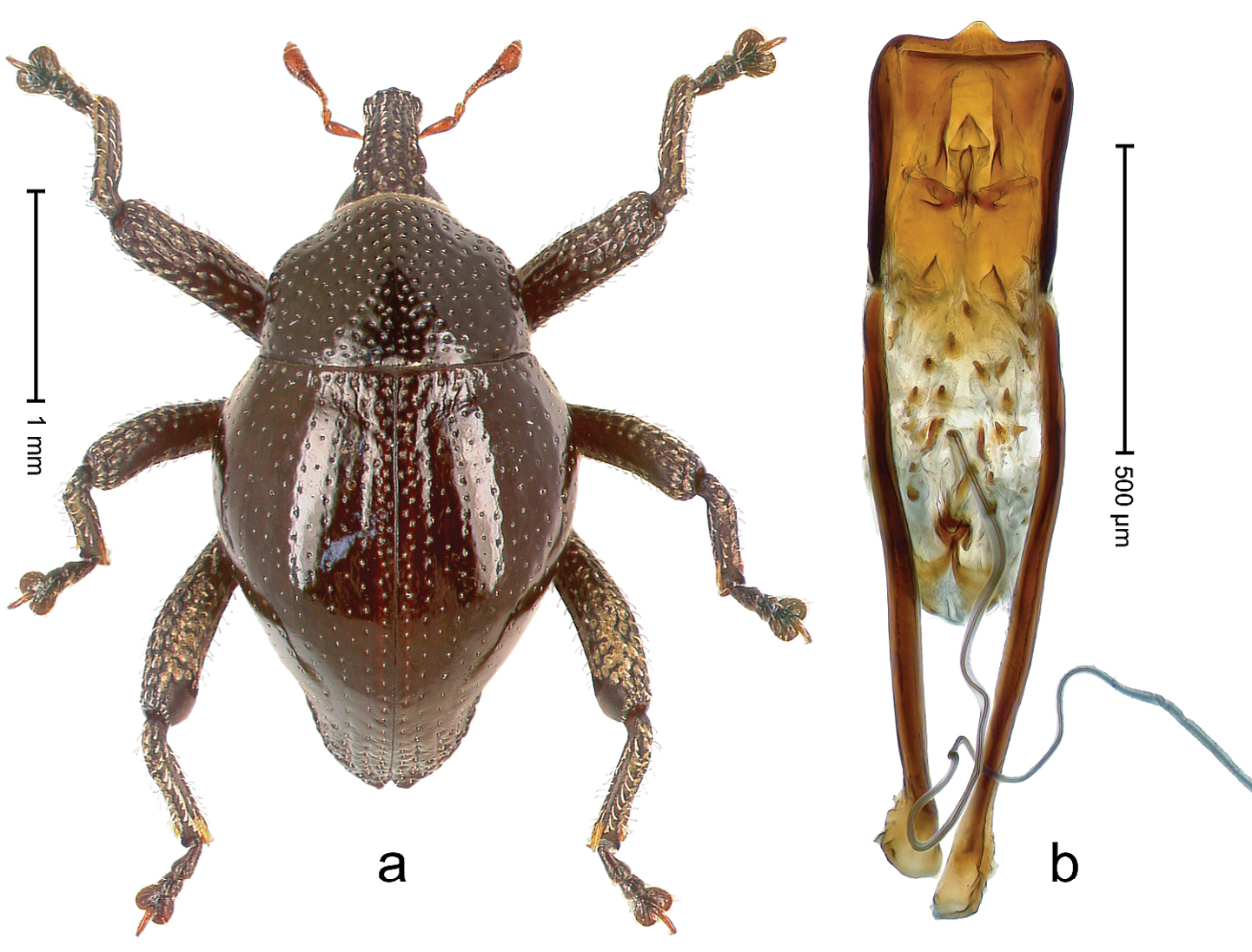

Scientific classification
- Kingdom: Animalia
- Phylum: Arthropoda
- Class: Insecta
- Order: Coleoptera
- Suborder: Polyphaga
- Infraorder: Cucujiformia
- Family: Curculionidae
- Genus: Trigonopterus
- Species: T. bornensis

Binomial name
- Trigonopterus bornensis Riedel, 2014

= Trigonopterus bornensis =

Species of beetle

Trigonopterus bornensis is a species of flightless weevil in the genus Trigonopterus from Indonesia. The species was described in 2014. The beetle is 2.35–2.81 mm long. It has a dark ferruginous body with light ferruginous antennae and a black pronotum. Endemic to Borneo, where it is known only from around Tanjung Redeb at elevations of 20–30 m (70–100 ft).

== Taxonomy ==
Trigonopterus bornensis was described by the entomologist Alexander Riedel in 2014 on the basis of an adult male specimen collected from near Tanjung Redeb on the island of Borneo in Indonesia. The species is named after the island on which it is found.

== Description ==
The beetle is 2.35–2.81 mm long. It has a dark ferruginous body with light ferruginous antennae and a black pronotum. The body is elongate with a pronounced constriction between the pronotum and elytra in dorsal view, and is dorsally convex in profile. The rostrum features a central ridge and a pair of indistinct submedian ridges, with the intervening furrows containing rows of coarse punctures and erect scales. The epistome bears a transverse, irregular ridge. The pronotum has subparallel sides in the basal half, rounding anteriorly into a faint subapical constriction. Its disc is densely punctate with nearly smooth interspaces, each puncture containing a small recumbent seta.

The elytra display striae marked by small punctures, each with a minute seta. The intervals are flat and nearly glabrous, with a few scattered punctures. The sutural intervals contain an additional row of punctures. The elytral apex is pointed, densely and coarsely punctate, with an incised suture. The femora have a crenate anteroventral ridge, and the metafemur bears a subapical stridulatory patch. The dorsal edge of the tibiae shows a subbasal angulation and is dentate in both the pro- and mesotibiae. Abdominal ventrites 1 and 2 are weakly concave to flat and nearly glabrous, with sparse erect scales. Ventrite 5 is flat, subglabrous at the base, sparsely punctate and microreticulate at the apex, and bears sparse erect scales.

The penis has subparallel sides that slightly diverge toward a subtruncate apex with a median triangular extension. The endophallus contains numerous coarse denticles and a pair of apical sclerites. The transfer apparatus is digiform and slightly curved. The apodemes are 2.5 times the length of the penis body and the ductus ejaculatorius lacks a distinct bulbus.

In females, the rostrum is nearly glabrous dorsally, with a submedian row of coarse punctures, subapical punctation, and sparse rows of subrecumbent scales on the sublateral areas. The epistome is simple and the elytral apex is unmodified.

== Distribution ==
Trigonopterus bornensis is endemic to the Indonesian province of East Kalimantan, where it is known only from around Tanjung Redeb. It has been recorded from elevations of 20–30 m (70–100 ft).
