= Gunung Tabur =

- District
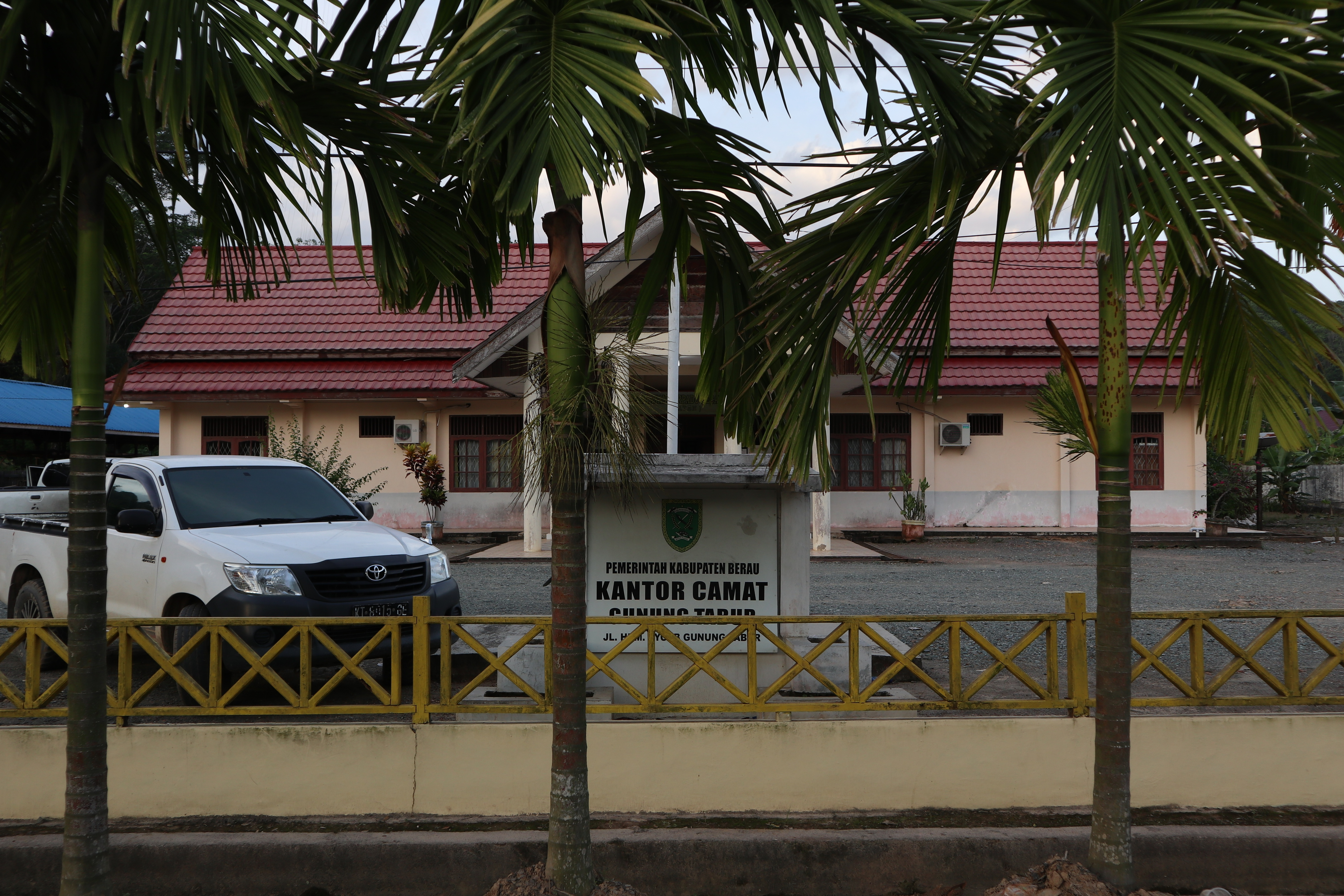
- Gunung Tabur District Office
- Interactive map of Gunung Tabur
- Location within East Kalimantan Location within Kalimantan Location within Indonesia
- Coordinates: 2°10′4.1844″N 117°29′14.8693″E
- Country: Indonesia
- Province: East Kalimantan
- Regency: Berau

Area
  - Total: 1,963.32 km^{2} (758.04 sq mi)

Population (2024)
  - Total: 33,512
  - Density: 17.069/km^{2} (44.209/sq mi)

Gunung Tabur (Indonesian pronunciation: [ˈɡunʊŋ ˈtabʊr], rarely also known by its translated name, Mount Tabur) is a district (kecamatan) in Berau Regency, East Kalimantan, Indonesia. In the mid 2024 estimate, it was inhabited by 33,512 people, and has a total area of 1,963.32 km^{2}. It shares border with East Tanjung Palas (part of Bulungan, North Kalimantan) to the north.

== Geography ==
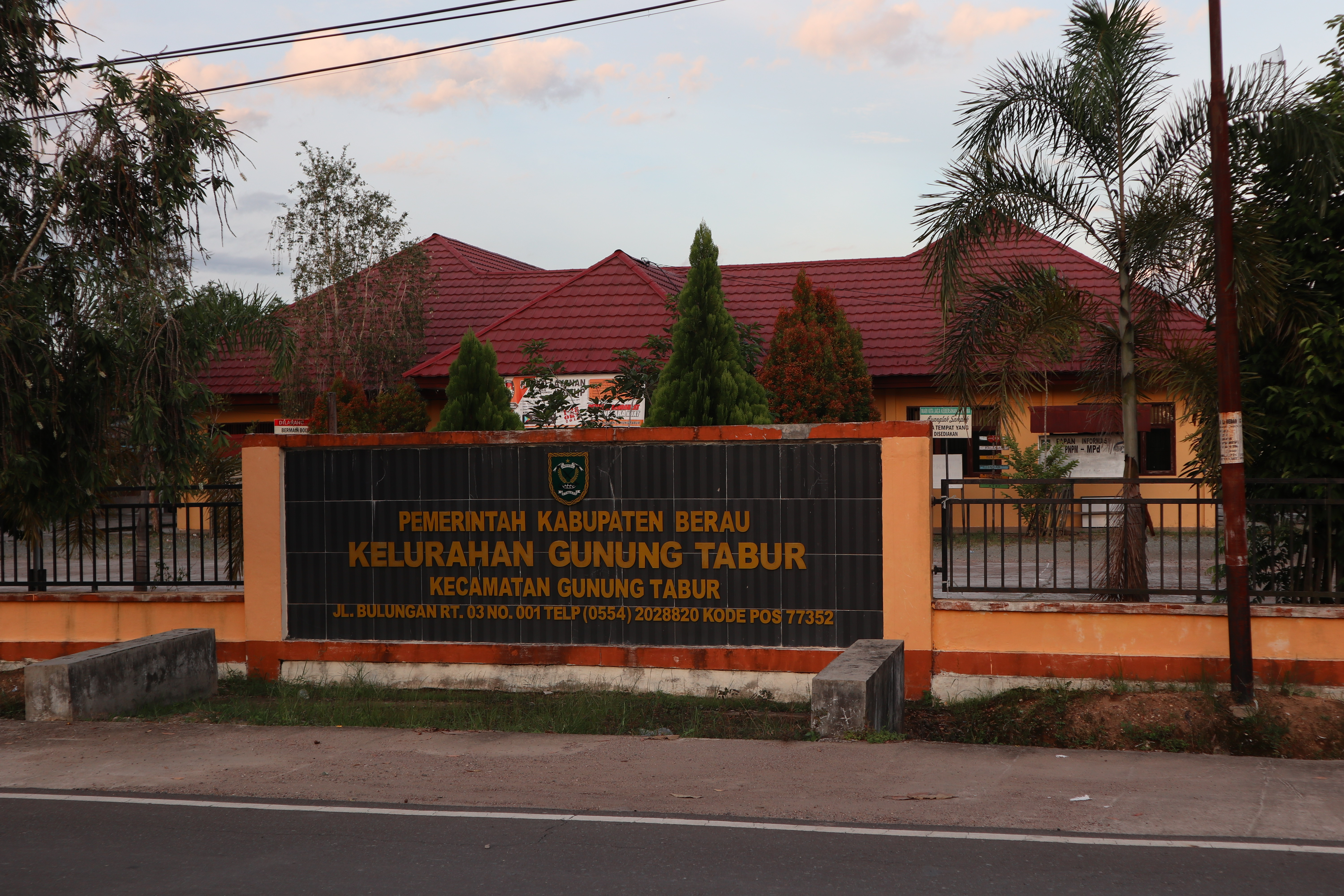
Gunung Tabur Village Office

Gunung Tabur District consists of one urban village (kelurahan) and ten rural village (desa):

- Gunung Tabur ^{(k)}
- Tasuk
- Birang
- Maluang
- Samburakat
- Sambakungan
- Merancang Ulu
- Merancang Ilir
- Pulau Besing
- Melati Jaya
- Batu-Batu
