= Lamin house =

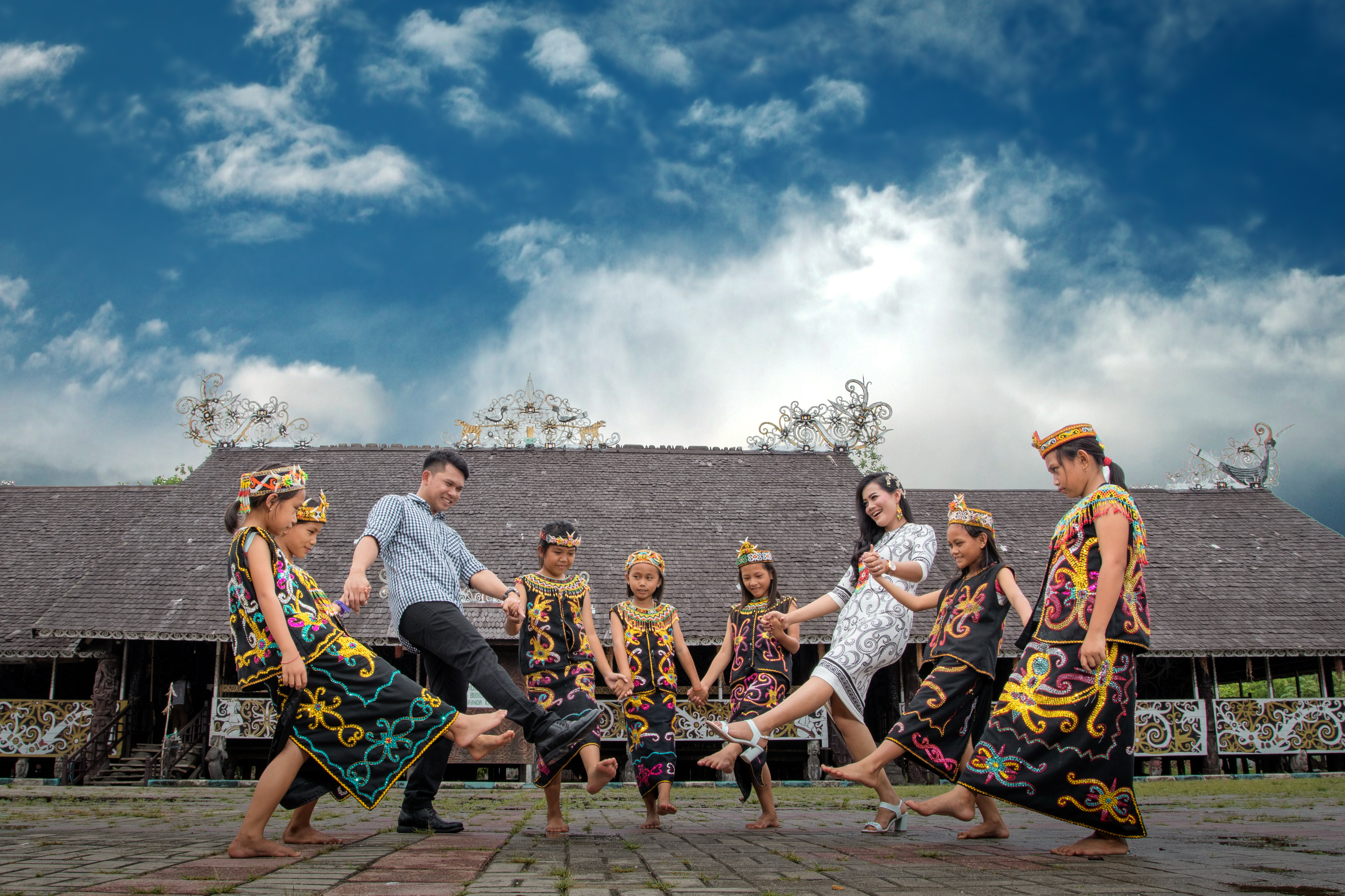
Several people posing front of the lamin at Budaya Pampang.

Lamin is the name for East Kalimantan traditional house. Lamin house is the identifier of the Dayak people who live at East Kalimantan. its 300 meters long, and 15 meters wide, as well as 3 meters high. Few families live in lamin houses because this house can accommodate approximately 100 people. In 1967, Indonesia Government inaugurated the lamin house at East Kalimantan. Lamin houses have few stanchion to sustain floor house. Lamin house basements are used to keep livestock.
