= Batu Putih =

- District
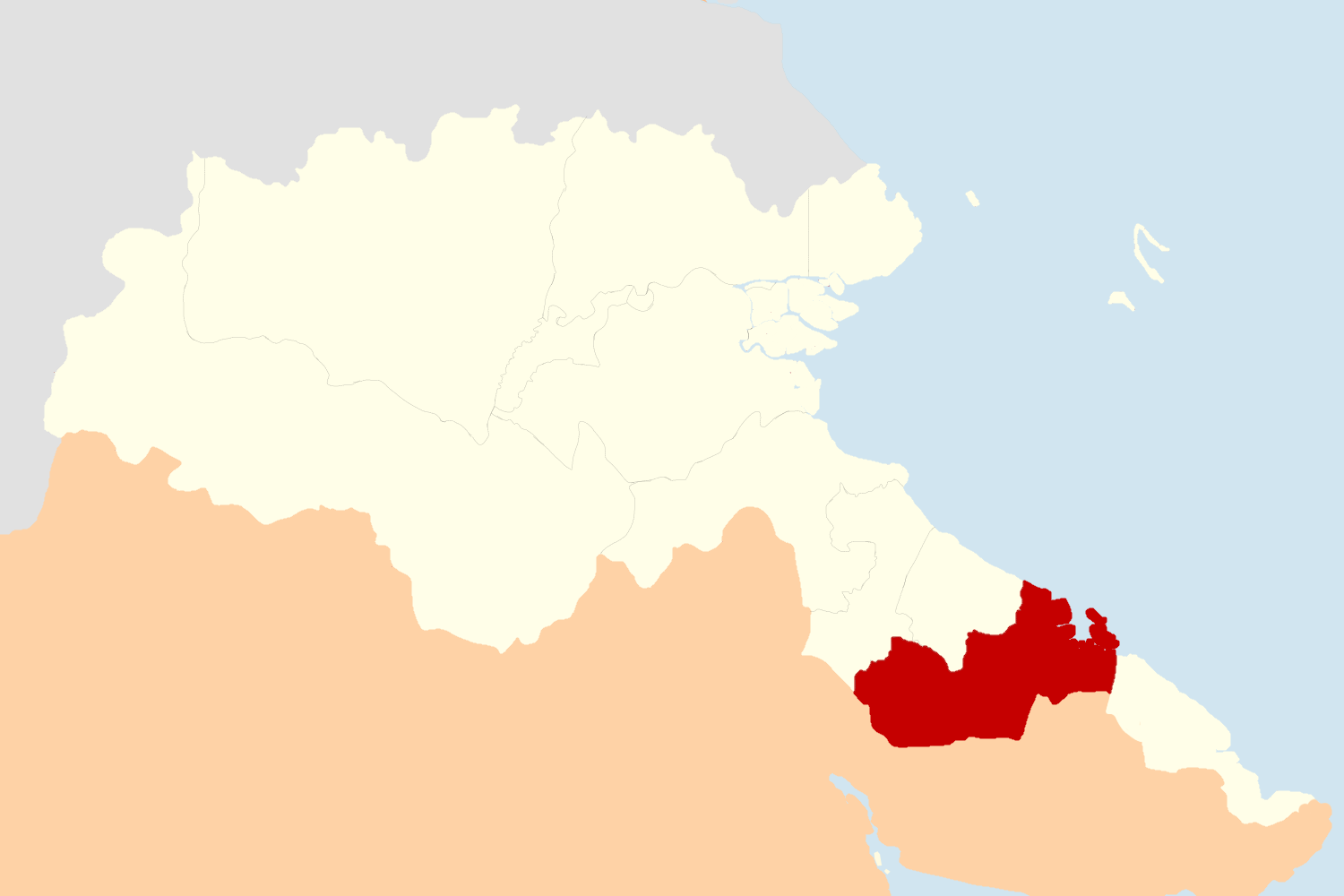
- Location within Berau Regency

- Location within East Kalimantan Location within Kalimantan Location within Indonesia
- Coordinates: 1°22′11.4528″N 118°25′16.212″E
- Country: Indonesia
- Province: East Kalimantan
- Regency: Berau
- District seat: Batu Putih

Area
  - Total: 3,575.30 km^{2} (1,380.43 sq mi)

Population (2024)
  - Total: 10,310
  - Density: 2.884/km^{2} (7.469/sq mi)

Batu Putih is a district (kecamatan) in Berau Regency, East Kalimantan, Indonesia. In the mid 2024 estimate, it was inhabited by 10,310 people, and has a total area of 3,575.30 km^{2}.

== Geography ==
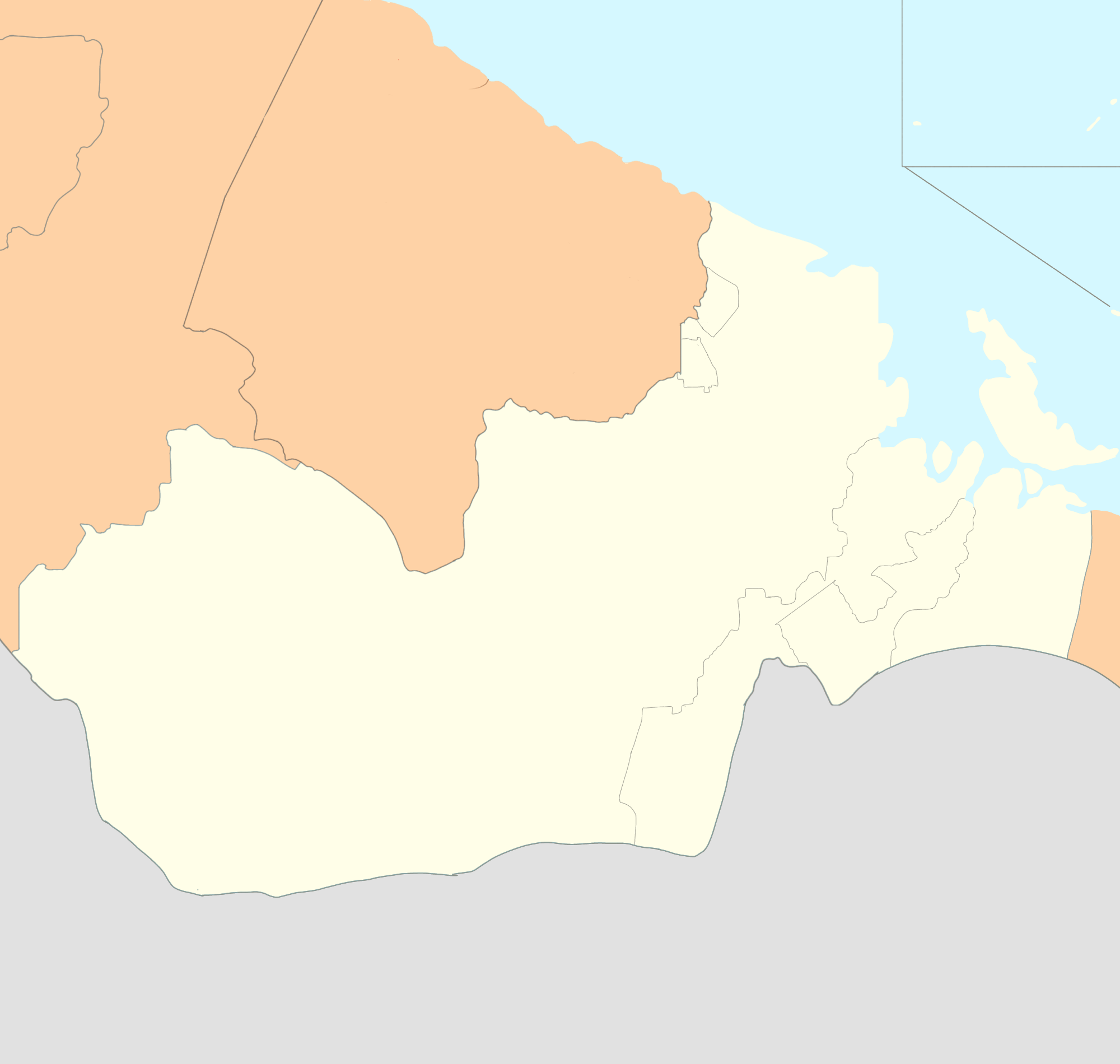
Map of village area divisions in Batu Putih district

Batu Putih consists of seven villages:

- Ampen Medang
- Balikukup
- Batu Putih
- Kayu Indah
- Lobang Kelatak
- Sumber Agung
- Tembudan
