= Kelay =

- District
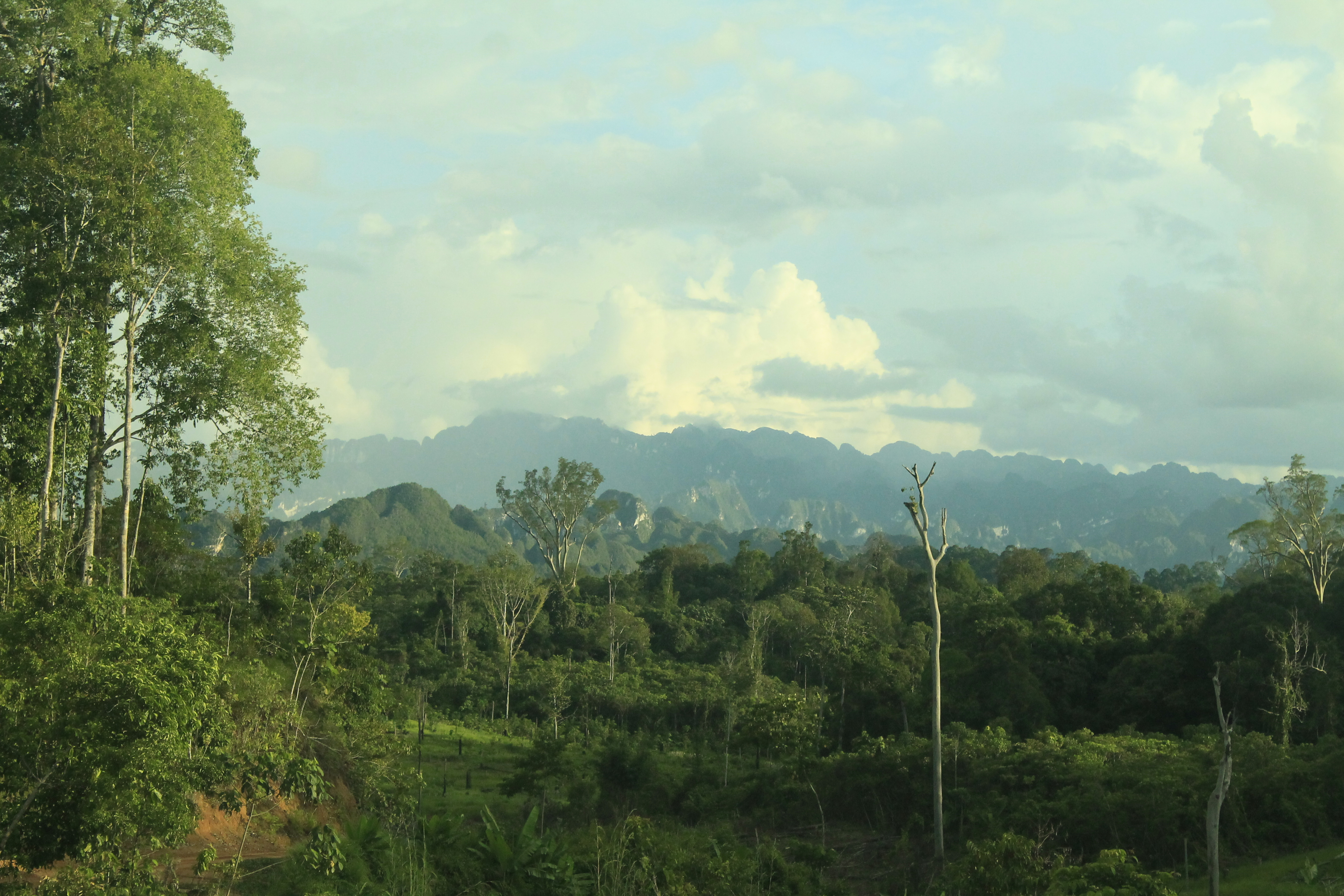
- Panorama Merabu, Kelay

- Location within East Kalimantan Location within Kalimantan Location within Indonesia
- Coordinates: 1°41′36.276″N 117°4′44.3136″E
- Country: Indonesia
- Province: East Kalimantan
- Regency: Berau
- District seat: Sido Bangen

Area
  - Total: 6,556.54 km^{2} (2,531.49 sq mi)

Population (2020)
  - Total: 8,958
  - Density: 1.366/km^{2} (3.539/sq mi)

Kelay is a district (kecamatan) in Berau Regency, East Kalimantan, Indonesia. In the 2020 Census, it was inhabited by 8,958 people, and has a total area of 6,556.54 km^{2}.

== Geography ==
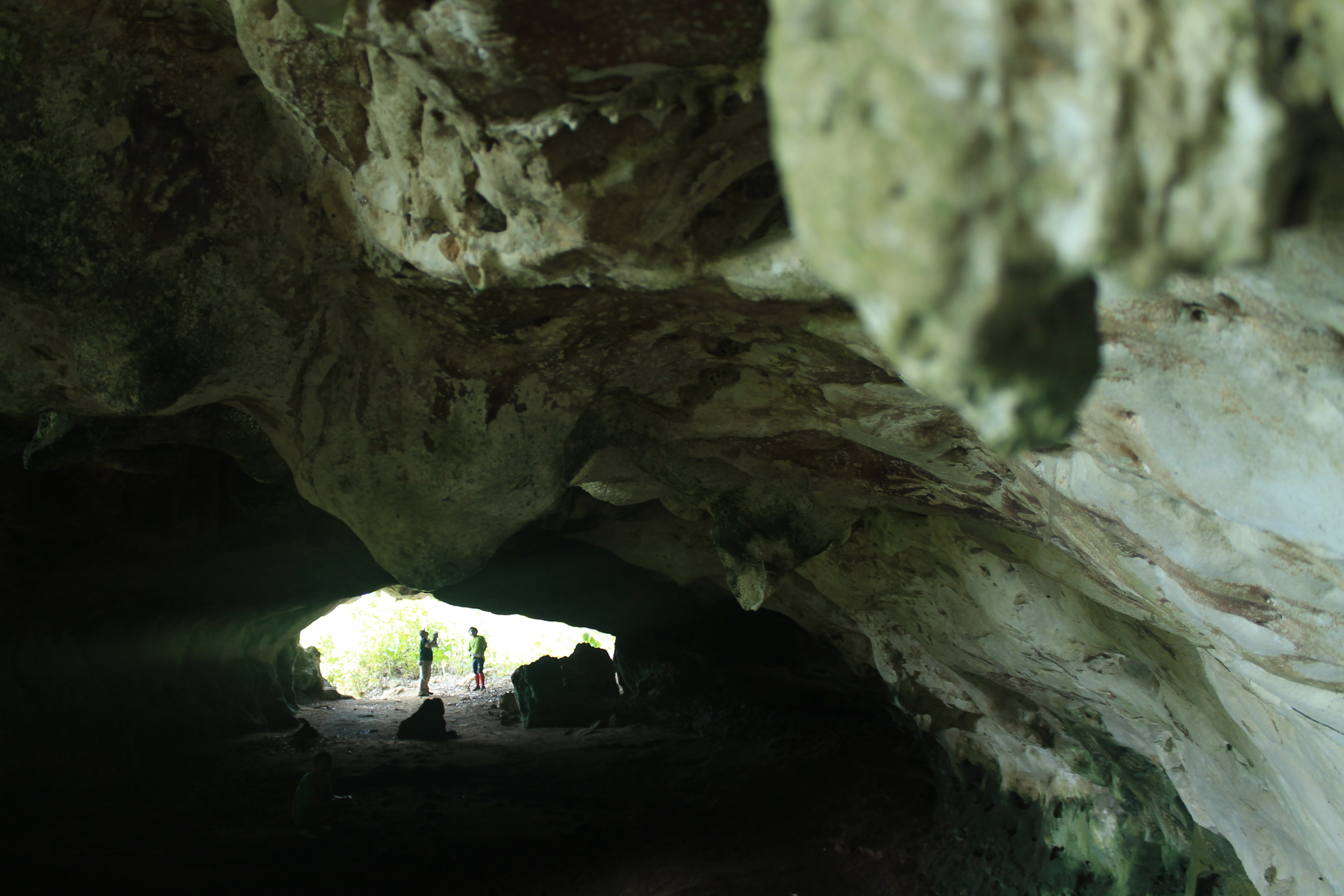
Bloyod Cave is located in the Merabu Karst Area, which is part of the Sangkulirang-Mangkalihat Karst landscape in East Kalimantan.

Kelay consists of 14 villages:

- Lesan Dayak
- Long Beliu
- Long Duhung
- Long Keluh
- Long Lamcin
- Long Pelay
- Long Sului
- Mapulu
- Merabu
- Merapun
- Merasa
- Muara Lesan
- Panaan
- Sido Bangen
