= North Samarinda =

District of Samarinda, East Kalimantan

North Samarinda Samarinda Utara
- District
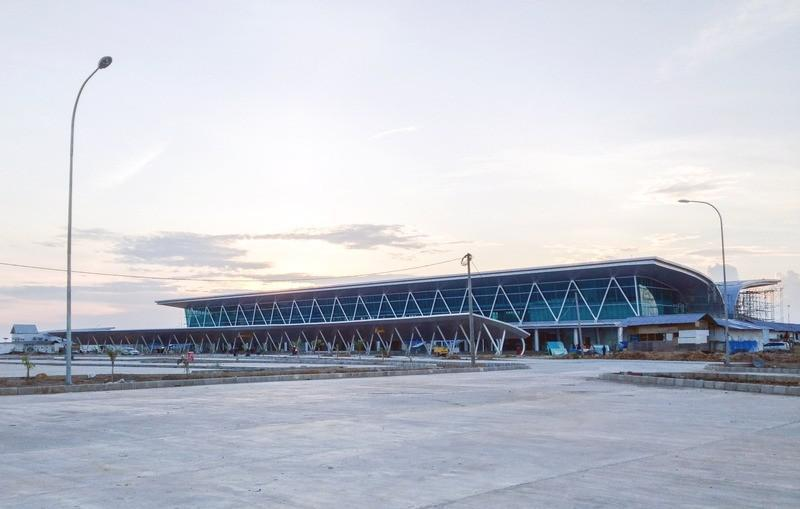
- Aji Pangeran Tumenggung Pranoto International Airport
- Interactive map of North Samarinda
- Location in Kalimantan and Indonesia North Samarinda (Indonesia)
- Coordinates: 0°26′24.80168″S 117°11′39.98436″E
- Country: Indonesia
- Province: East Kalimantan
- Regency: Samarinda
- Established: 11 June 1996
- District seat: Lempake

Government
  - District head (Camat): Heriyanto

Area
  - Total: 229.52 km^{2} (88.62 sq mi)

Population (2023)
  - Total: 112,076
  - Density: 488.31/km^{2} (1,264.7/sq mi)
- Time zone: UTC+8 (ICT)
- Postal code: 75117 - 75119
- Regional code: 64.72.05
- Villages: 8

North Samarinda (Indonesian: Samarinda Utara, Indonesian pronunciation: [samaˈrinda ˈutara]) is a district of Samarinda, East Kalimantan, Indonesia. As of 2023, it was inhabited by 112,076 people, and currently has a total area of 229.52 km^{2}. Its district seat is located at the village of Lempake.

The district was formed on 11 June 1996 from the northern parts of Samarinda Ilir, and it initially consisted of 6 villages. On 14 December 2010, the district of Sungai Pinang was separated from North Samarinda. Previously, its district seat was located at Sungai Pinang Dalam.

== Governance ==
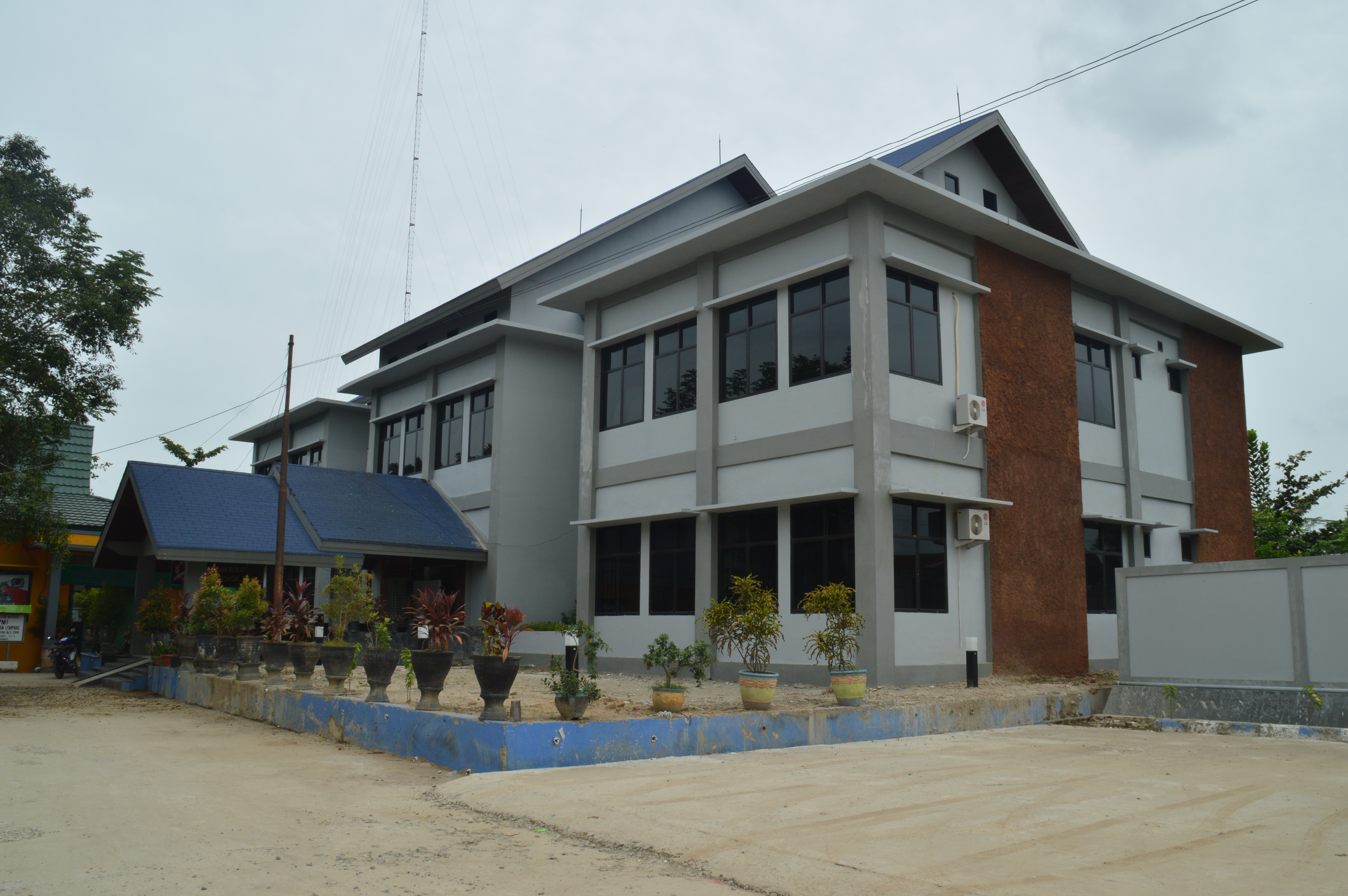
District head office at Lempake, North Samarinda.

=== Villages ===
North Samarinda is divided into the following 8 villages (kelurahan):

Regional code (Kode wilayah)	Name	Area (km^{2})	Population (2023)	RT (rukun tetangga)
64.72.05.1002	South Sempaja (Sempaja Selatan)	6.11	16,682	33
64.72.05.1003	Lempake	32.83	23,333	52
64.72.05.1004	Sungai Siring	49.06	4,712	13
64.72.05.1010	North Sempaja (Sempaja Utara)	58.38	24,675	43
64.72.05.1011	Tanah Merah	22.16	11,036	9
64.72.05.1012	West Sempaja (Sempaja Barat)	8.42	5,793	12
64.72.05.1013	East Sempaja (Sempaja Timur)	25.83	24,191	54
64.72.05.1014	Budaya Pampang; Pampang	26.77	1,654	6
	Totals	100.95	112,076	244

The villages of West Sempaja, East Sempaja, and Budaya Pampang were created on 12 August 2014 from parts of South Sempaja (first two) and Sungai Siring, respectively.

== Demographics ==
Historical population
Year	Pop.	±%
2014	83,687	—
2015	100,750	+20.4%
2016	115,890	+15.0%
2017	120,305	+3.8%
2018	124,753	+3.7%
2019	129,319	+3.7%
2020	106,743	−17.5%
2021	105,172	−1.5%
2022	109,040	+3.7%
2023	112,076	+2.8%
Source: Badan Pusat Statistik 2018–2024.
