= Samarinda Ilir =

District of Samarinda, East Kalimantan

- District
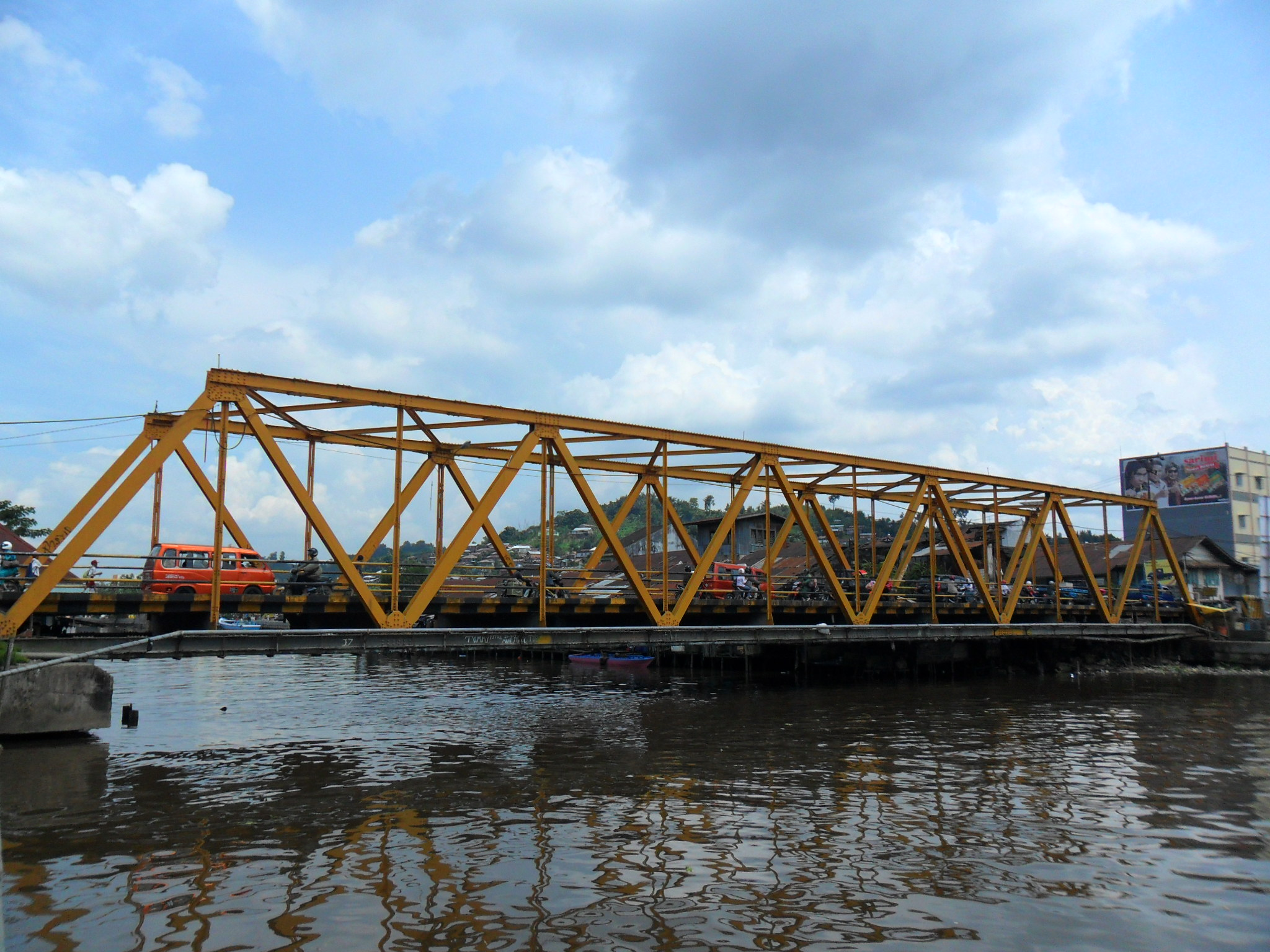
- Sungai Dama Bridge
- Interactive map of Samarinda Ilir
- Location Samarinda Ilir (Indonesia)
- Coordinates: 0°30′26.064″S 117°10′9.372″E
- Country: Indonesia
- Province: East Kalimantan
- City: Samarinda
- District seat: Sidomulyo

Government
  - District head (Camat): La Uje

Area
  - Total: 16.10 km^{2} (6.22 sq mi)

Population (2023)
  - Total: 69,766
  - Density: 4,333/km^{2} (11,220/sq mi)
- Time zone: UTC+8 (ICT)
- Regional code: 64.72.04
- Villages: 5

Samarinda Ilir (Indonesian pronunciation: [samaˈrinda ˈilɪr], lit. 'lower Samarinda') is a district of Samarinda, East Kalimantan, Indonesia. As of 2023, it was inhabited by 16,287 people, and currently has the total area of 11.12 km^{2}.

Its district seat is located at the village of Sidomulyo. On 11 June 1996, North Samarinda was separated from the district. On 14 December 2010, Samarinda Kota (4 districts) and Sambutan were separated from the district, then, its seat was located at Sambutan.

== Governance ==
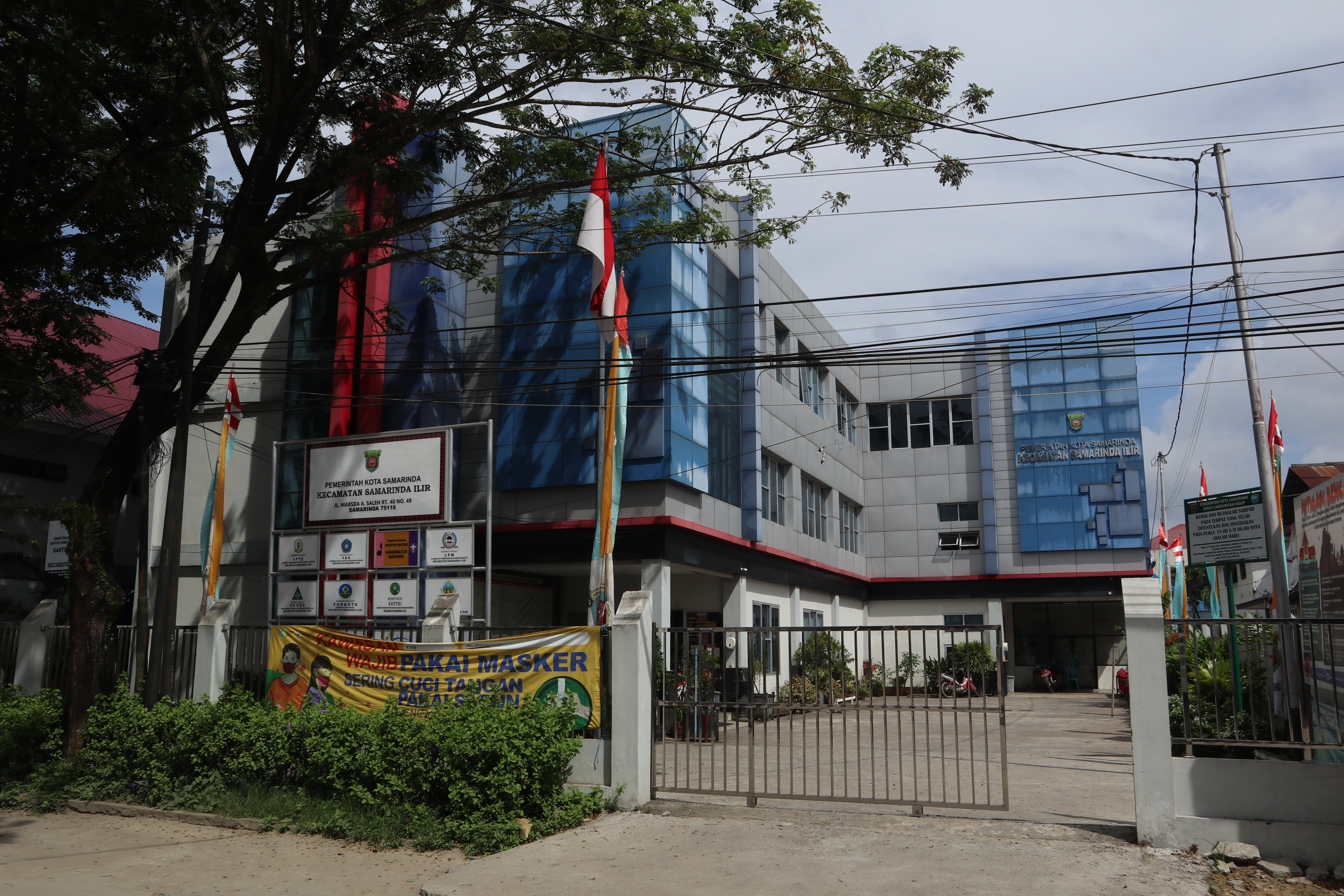
District head office at Sidomulyo, Samarinda Ilir.

=== Villages ===
Samarinda Ilir is divided into the following 5 villages (kelurahan):

| Regional code (Kode wilayah) | Name | Area (km^{2}) | Population (2023) | RT (rukun tetangga) |
|---|---|---|---|---|
| 64.72.01.1001 | Selili | 1.49 | 12,604 | 37 |
| 64.72.01.1002 | Sidodamai | 1.25 | 14,184 | 32 |
| 64.72.01.1003 | Sidomulyo | 1.94 | 17,105 | 41 |
| 64.72.01.1013 | Sungai Dama | 2.50 | 9,659 | 33 |
| 64.72.01.1014 | Pelita | 8.92 | 16,214 | 46 |
| | Totals | 11.12 | 69,766 | 189 |
