= Tanjung Redeb =

Coordinates: 2°9′13″N 117°29′49″E

- Town and District (kecamatan)
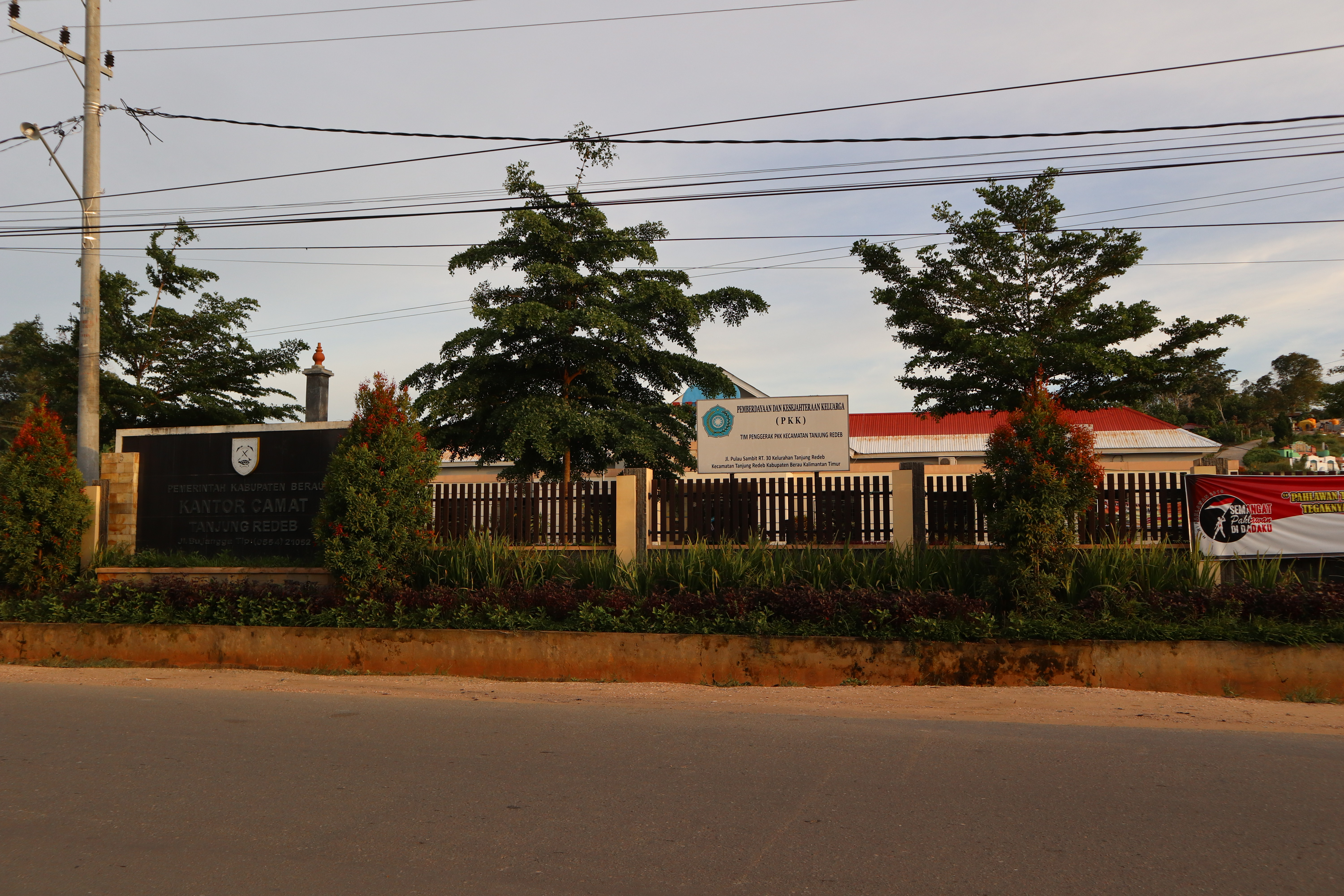
- Tanjung Redeb District office
- Interactive map of Tanjung Redeb
- Country: Indonesia
- Province: East Kalimantan
- Regency: Berau
- Villages: 6 villages (kelurahan)

Government

Area
  - Total: 24.42 km^{2} (9.43 sq mi)

Population (mid 2024 estimate)
  - Total: 78,230
  - Density: 3,204/km^{2} (8,297/sq mi)

Tanjung Redeb is a town and administrative district (kecamatan) which serves as the administrative centre of Berau Regency, in East Kalimantan Province of Indonesia. It covers an area of 24.42 km^{2}, and at the 2020 Census it had a population of 71,231. The official estimate as at mid 2024 was 78,230.

== History ==
The Berau area takes its name from an ancient kingdom which originally included the large area to the north that now forms the separate province of North Kalimantan (Kalimantan Utara). Following a civil war in 1770, this was split into four sultanates - Bulungan and Tidung to the north (now North Kalimantan), and Gunung Tabur and Sambuliang to the south, in what is the drainage basin of the Berau River.

Tanjung Redeb lies at the junction of the Segan River and Kelai River, where they unite to form the Berai River close to the coast. The historic palaces of the former sultans of Gunung Tabur (or Mount Tabur) and Samuliang both lie in the built-up area of Tanjung Redeb. The former, on the Segan River, was destroyed by Japanese bombing during World War Two, but was subsequently rebuilt as an exact copy and now serves as a museum. The latter palace was not bombed and remains an attraction on the side of the Kelai River.

== Administration ==
Tanjung Redeb district is composed of six urban villages (kelurahan).

Kode Wilayah	Name of kelurahan or desa	Area in km^{2}	Pop'n Estimate mid 2024	Post code
64.03.05.1003	Sungai Bedungun	8.83	11,911	77315
64.03.05.1004	Tanjung Redeb	2.83	18,608	77315
64.03.05.1005	Bugis	0.92	8,816	77312
64.03.05.1008	Gunung Panjang	8.57	13,360	77311
64.03.05.1007	Karang Ambun	2.29	13,394	77315
64.03.05.1006	Gayam	1.34	11,141	77315
	Totals	24.78	78,230	

== Climate ==
Tanjung Redeb has a tropical rainforest climate (Af) with moderate rainfall from July to September and heavy rainfall in the remaining months.

Climate data for Tanjung Redeb
Month	Jan	Feb	Mar	Apr	May	Jun	Jul	Aug	Sep	Oct	Nov	Dec	Year
Mean daily maximum °C (°F)	29.9 (85.8)	30.0 (86.0)	30.2 (86.4)	30.4 (86.7)	30.7 (87.3)	30.4 (86.7)	30.4 (86.7)	30.7 (87.3)	30.7 (87.3)	31.0 (87.8)	30.7 (87.3)	30.2 (86.4)	30.4 (86.8)
Daily mean °C (°F)	26.3 (79.3)	26.4 (79.5)	26.6 (79.9)	26.8 (80.2)	27.1 (80.8)	26.8 (80.2)	26.7 (80.1)	26.9 (80.4)	26.9 (80.4)	27.1 (80.8)	27.0 (80.6)	26.5 (79.7)	26.8 (80.2)
Mean daily minimum °C (°F)	22.8 (73.0)	22.9 (73.2)	23.1 (73.6)	23.3 (73.9)	23.5 (74.3)	23.2 (73.8)	23.0 (73.4)	23.1 (73.6)	23.1 (73.6)	23.2 (73.8)	23.3 (73.9)	23.1 (73.6)	23.1 (73.6)
Average rainfall mm (inches)	193 (7.6)	173 (6.8)	152 (6.0)	149 (5.9)	159 (6.3)	153 (6.0)	121 (4.8)	116 (4.6)	122 (4.8)	147 (5.8)	201 (7.9)	195 (7.7)	1,881 (74.2)
Source: Climate-Data.org
