= Berau Regency =

Regency in East Kalimantan, Indonesia

Berau Regency Kabupaten Berau
- Regency
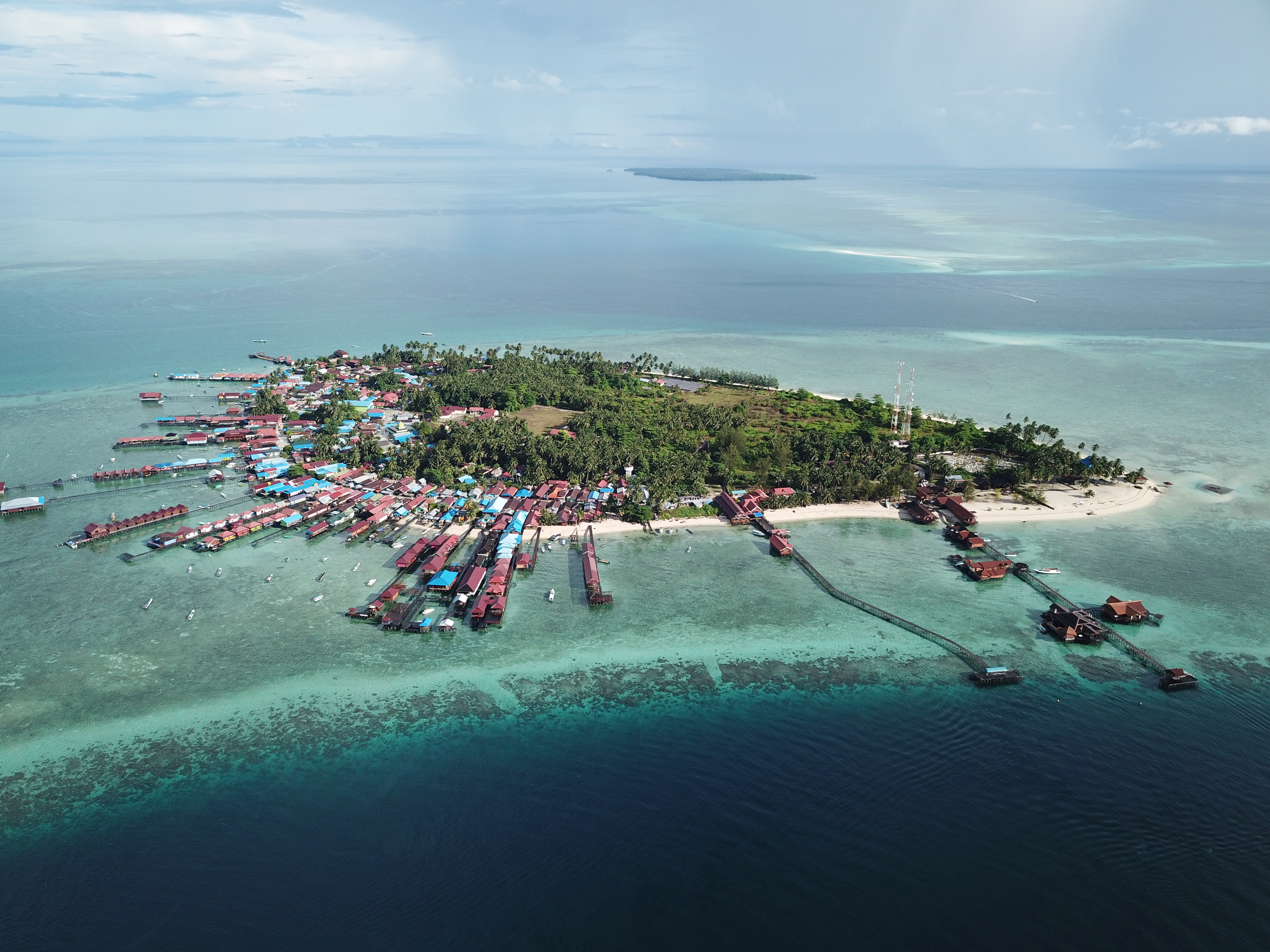
- Aerial view of Derawan Island

- Coat of arms

- Location within East Kalimantan

- Location in Kalimantan and Indonesia Berau Regency (Indonesia)
- Coordinates: 2.0000°N 117.3000°E
- Country: Indonesia
- Province: East Kalimantan
- Capital: Tanjung Redeb

Government
  - Regent: Sri Juniarsih Mas
  - Vice Regent: Gamalis

Area
  - Total: 36,962.37 km^{2} (14,271.25 sq mi)

Population (mid 2025 estimate)
  - Total: 308,020
  - Density: 8.3333/km^{2} (21.583/sq mi)
- Time zone: UTC+8 (ICST)
- Area code: (+62) 554
- Website: beraukab.go.id

Berau Regency (Indonesian: Kabupaten Berau, Berau: Barrau) is the most northern of the seven regencies in East Kalimantan province in Indonesia. The capital is the town of Tanjung Redeb. The regency has an area of 36,962.37 km^{2} and had a population of 179,079 at the 2010 census and 248,035 at the 2020 census; the official estimate as at mid 2025 was 308,020 (comprising 163,632 males and 144,388 females).

Berau was formerly the name of a local sultanate that existed from the 17th century and originally included what is now the province of North Kalimantan. This was split up following a civil war in 1770 into four separate sultanates during the Dutch colonial period. In the early 19th century, the remaining portion was divided between two separate sultanates: Gunung Tabur and Sambaliung, now substantialy reunited into the present Berau Regency.

== Administrative districts ==
Berau Regency is divided into thirteen districts (kecamatan), tabulated below with their areas and their populations at the 2010 census and the 2020 census, together with the official estimates as at mid 2025. The table also includes the location of the district headquarters, the number of administrative villages in each district (a total of 100 rural desa and 10 urban kelurahan), and of offshore islands in each district, and its postal codes.

| Kode Wilayah | Name of District (kecamatan) | Area in km^{2} | Pop'n census 2010 | Pop'n census 2020 | Pop'n Estimate mid 2025 | Admin centre | No. of villages | No. of islands | Post codes |
|---|---|---|---|---|---|---|---|---|---|
| 64.03.01 | Kelay | 6,556.54 | 4,493 | 8,958 | 8,580 | Sido Bangen | 14 | - | 77362 |
| 64.03.02 | Talisayan | 1,621.57 | 10,061 | 14,614 | 19,039 | Talisayan | 10 | 1 | 77375 |
| 64.03.10 | Tabalar | 1,837.34 | 5,151 | 6,843 | 8,639 | Tubaan | 6 | 2 | 77374 |
| 64.03.08 | Biduk-Biduk | 2,429.97 | 5,342 | 6,609 | 8,276 | Biduk-Biduk | 6 | 6 | 77373 |
| 64.03.07 | Pulau Derawan ^{(a)} | 4,423.99 | 8,372 | 11,341 | 15,306 | Tanjung Batu | 5 | 12 | 77380 |
| 64.03.11 | Maratua | 5,616.26 | 3,076 | 3,664 | 4,063 | Maratua Teluk Harapan | 4 | 25 | 77381 |
| 64.03.03 | Sambaliung | 2,163.37 | 24,174 | 36,784 | 49,365 | Sambaliung | 14 ^{(b)} | - | 77371 |
| 64.03.05 | Tanjung Redeb | 24.42 | 62,725 | 71,231 | 79,332 | Tanjung Redeb | 6 ^{(c)} | - | 77315 ^{(d)} |
| 64.03.06 | Gunung Tabur | 1,963.32 | 14,938 | 25,012 | 34,890 | Gunung Tabur | 11 ^{(e)} | 15 | 77352 |
| 63.03.04 | Segah | 5,241.29 | 8,396 | 14,368 | 21,367 | Tepian Buah | 13 | - | 77361 |
| 64.03.09 | Teluk Bayur (Bayur Bay) | 316.98 | 20,596 | 31,135 | 37,995 | Teluk Bayur | 6 ^{(f)} | - | 77352 ^{(g)} |
| 64.03.12 | Batu Putih | 3,575.30 | 6,691 | 8,840 | 10,658 | Batu Putih | 7 | 5 | 77373 ^{(h)} |
| 64.03.13 | Biatan | 1,192.03 | 5,064 | 8,636 | 10,510 | Biatan Lempake | 8 | - | 77372 |
| | Totals | 36,962.37 | 53,671 | 248,035 | 308,020 | Tanjung Redeb | 110 | 66 | |

Notes: (a) while the name of this district literally means "Derawan Island", in practice the district includes a dozen large islands off the estuarin delta of the Berau River (Badakbadak, Bingkar, Derawan, Guntung, Labulabu, Lalawan, Manambula, Panjang, Samama, Sangalaki, Tempurung and Tidung) together with part of the 'mainland' of Kalimantan.
(b) includes one kelurahan - the town of Sambaliung. (c) all six are kelurahan - Bugis, Gayam, Gunung Panjang, Karang Ambun, Sungai Bedungun and Tanjung Redeb.
(d) except the towns of Gunung Panjang (with a post code of 77311) and Bugis (with a post code of 77312.
(e) includes one kelurahan - the town of Gunung Tabur. (f) includes two kelurahan - the towns of Teluk Bayur and Rinding.
(g) except the towns of Rinding (with a post code of 77313) and Teluk Bayur and the village of Tumbit Melayu (with a post code of 77315).
(h) except the villages (desa) of Tembudan, Kayu Indah and Sumber Agung (all with a post code of 77372).

The majority of the Regency includes the catchment basin of the Berau River, which covers 16,993 km^{2}, while the south-eastern corner of the Regency is almost separated geographically from the main area of the regency, and forms the northern section of a peninsula projecting into the Makassar Strait. The Berau catchment area is centred on the town of Tanjung Redeb, situated where the tributaries of the Segah River and the Kelai River join to form the Berau river for its continuing distance eastwards into the Celebes Sea. The peninsula comprises the districts of Tabalar, Biatan, Talisayan, Batu Putih and Biduk-Biduk, covering a combined area of 10,656.21 km^{2} with a population of 57,122 in mid 2025. The peninsula is formed by the eastward projection of the Sambaliung Mountains which separates the Celebes Sea from the Makassar Strait (Pegunungan Sambaliung), with these Berau Regency districts along its north slopes and East Kutai districts (notably Karangan, Kauban, Kaliorang, Sangkulirang and Sandaran districts) along its south slopes. Under consideration is a proposal to separate these five Berau districts off to create a new South Coast Berau Regency (Indonesian: Kabupaten Berau Pesisir Selatan), with its proposed capital at Talisayan.

== Berau Marine Conservation Area ==
Konservasi Kawasan Laut (KKL) Berau (or "Berau Marine Conservation Area") was formed in 2005 and has an area of 1.321 million hectares, which includes Pulau Panjang (Long Island), Karangtigau Cape, and Baliktaba Reef. The area has the second highest coral reef biodiversity in Indonesia after Raja Ampat Islands and third highest in the world. The ecosystem covers coral reef, mangrove forest and sea grass.

== Literary significance ==
The novelist Joseph Conrad made four visits to Berau, stopping at Tanjung Redeb, while employed as the first mate of the merchant vessel S.S. Vidar in 1887–1888. The geographical setting and the lives of the small number of European traders based in Berau made a profound impression on him, and the setting for three of his novels (Almayer's Folly, An Outcast of the Islands and the second part of Lord Jim) is loosely based on Berau. Conrad sometimes refers to the Berau river as Pantai ("beach") and uses the fictional name Sambir to refer to Tanjung Redeb.
