= Manggar, Balikpapan =

Manggar Kelurahan Manggar
- Subdistrict
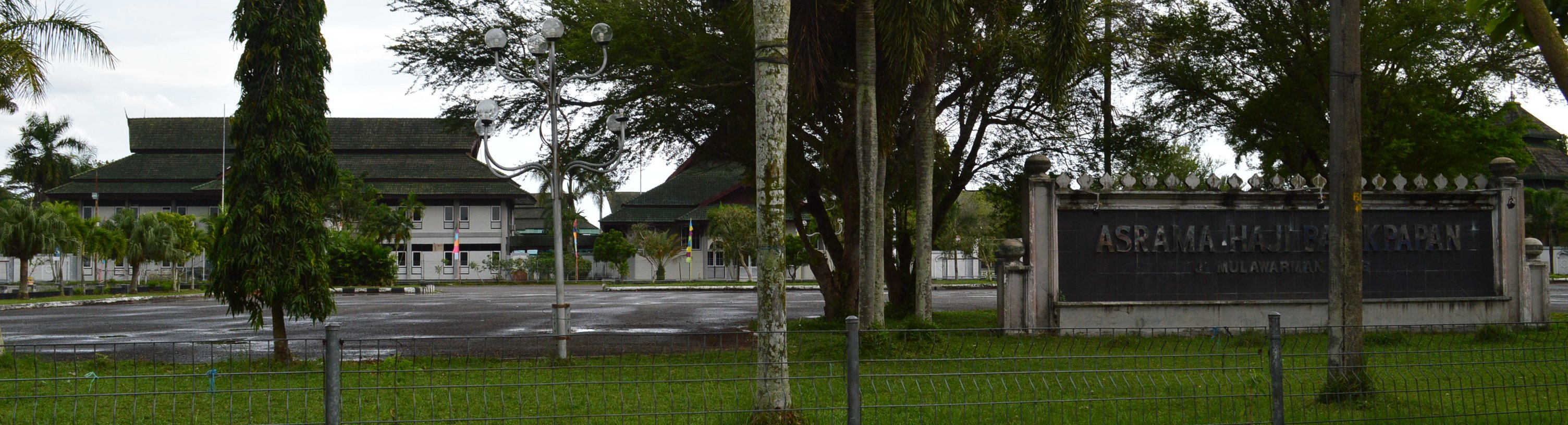
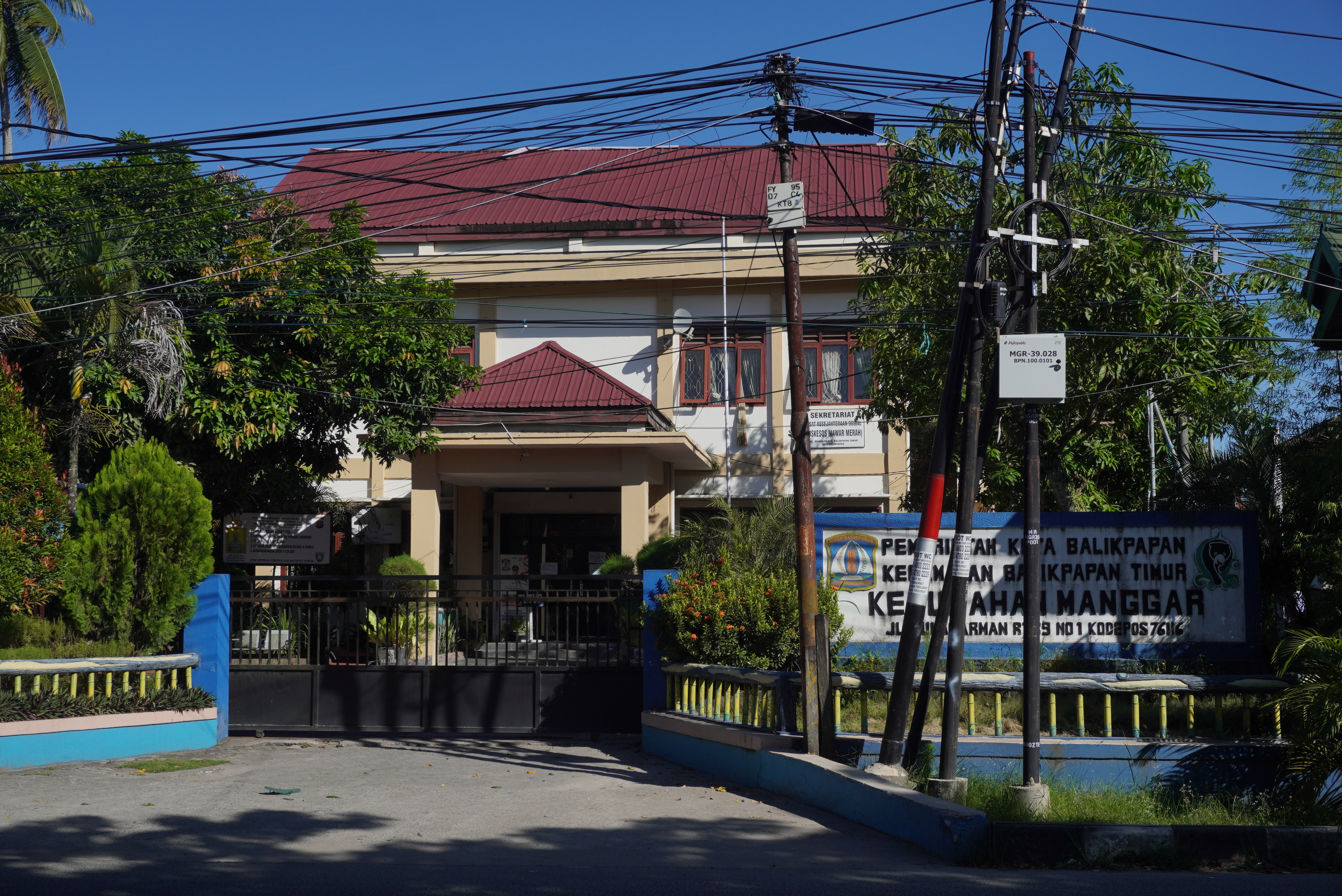
- (From the top: Hajj Boarding House Balikpapan bottom: Office government Manggar subdistrict)

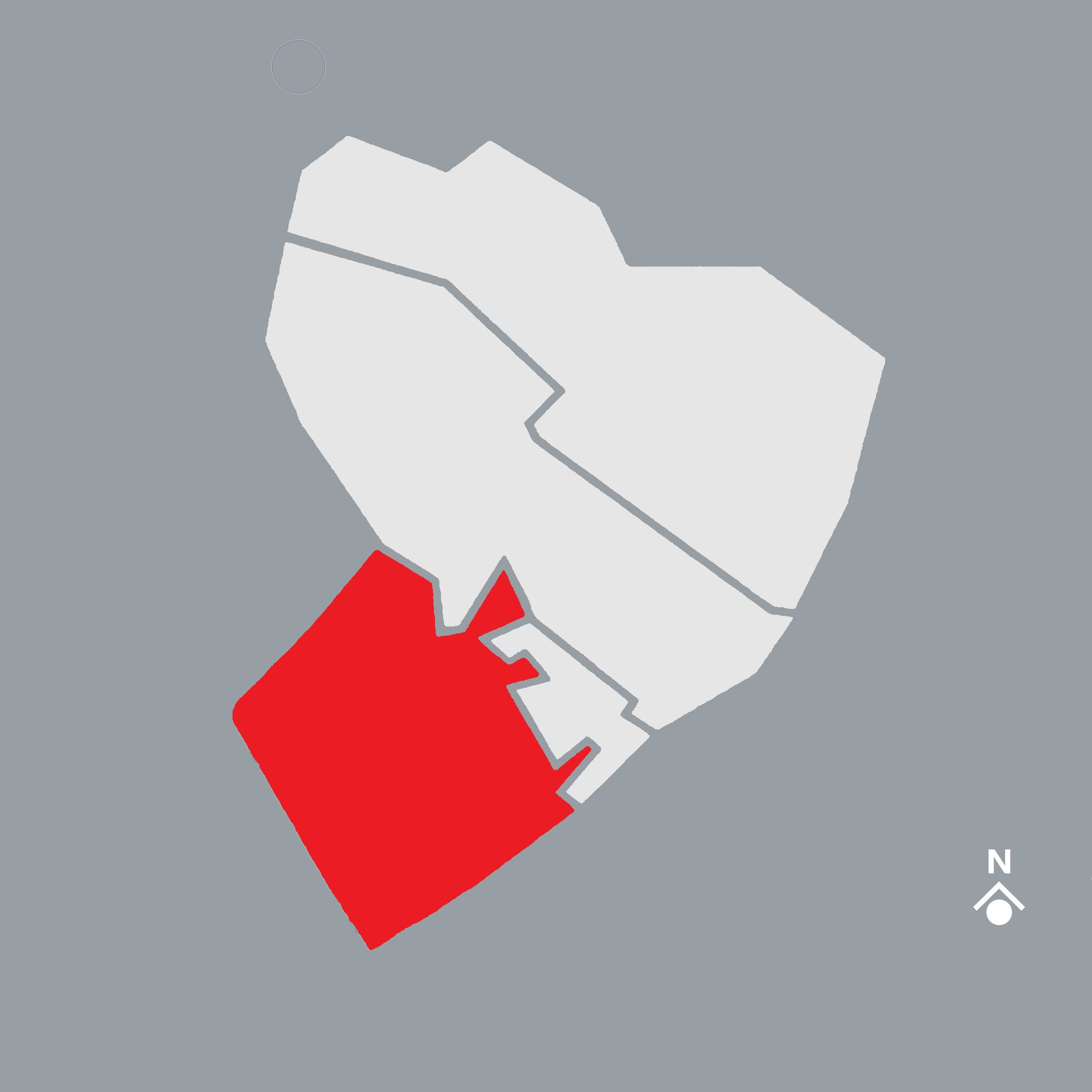
- Location of Manggar subdistrict from East Balikpapan
- Interactive map of Manggar subdistrict
- Coordinates: 1.196221°S 116.963196°E
- Country: Indonesia
- Province: East Kalimantan
- City: Balikpapan
- District: East Balikpapan

Government
  - Subdistrict mayor: Dedi Prasetia Utama Idris

Area
  - Total: 35.255 km^{2} (13.612 sq mi)
- Time zone: GMT +8
- Website: Official website (in Indonesia)

Manggar is a subdistrict in the East Balikpapan, Balikpapan.

== Tourisms ==
- Alpha Hill (Bukit Alpha)
- Batakan Beach (Pantai Batakan)
