= Manggar Baru, Balikpapan =

Manggar Baru Kelurahan Manggar Baru
- Subdistrict
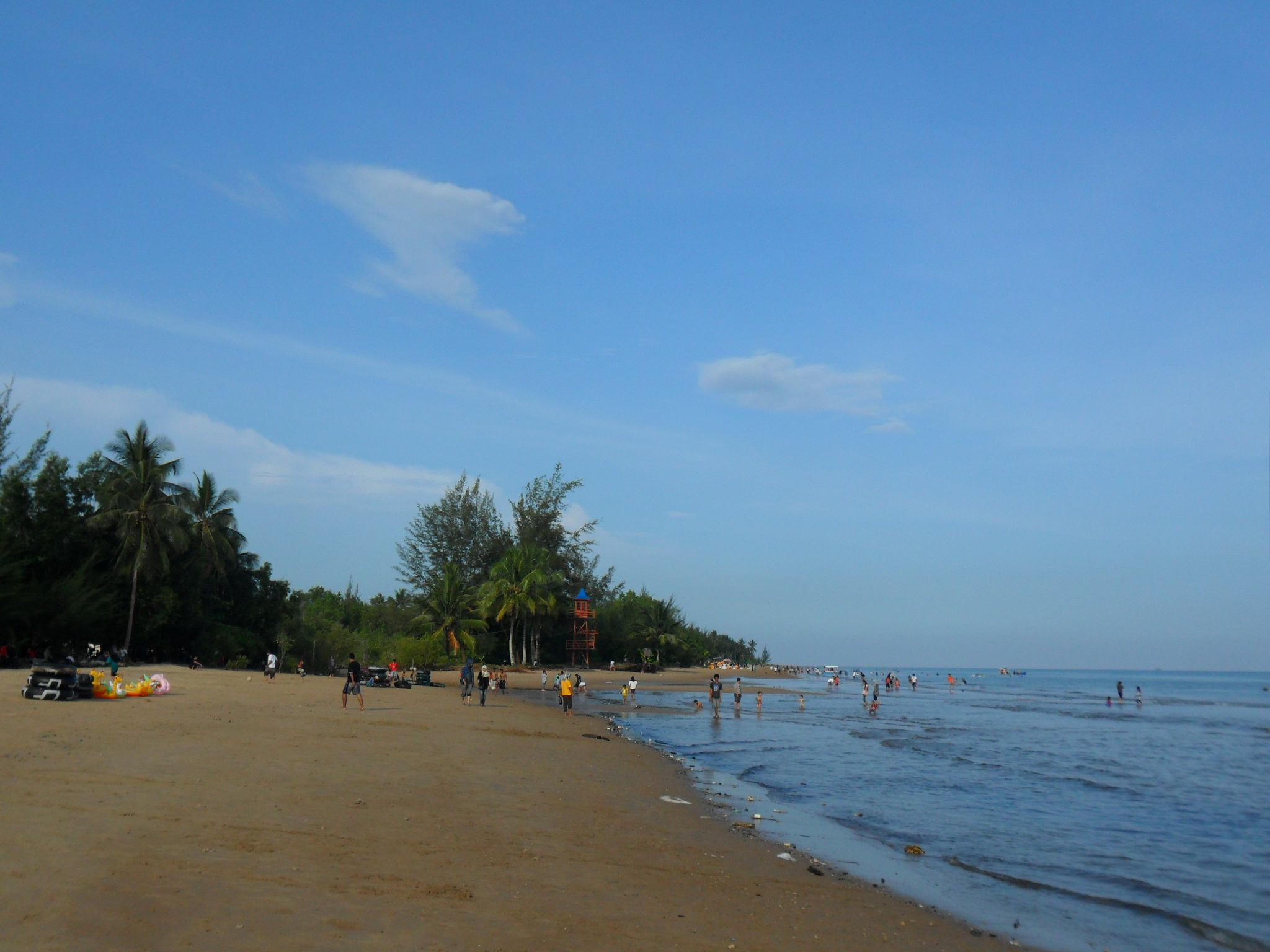
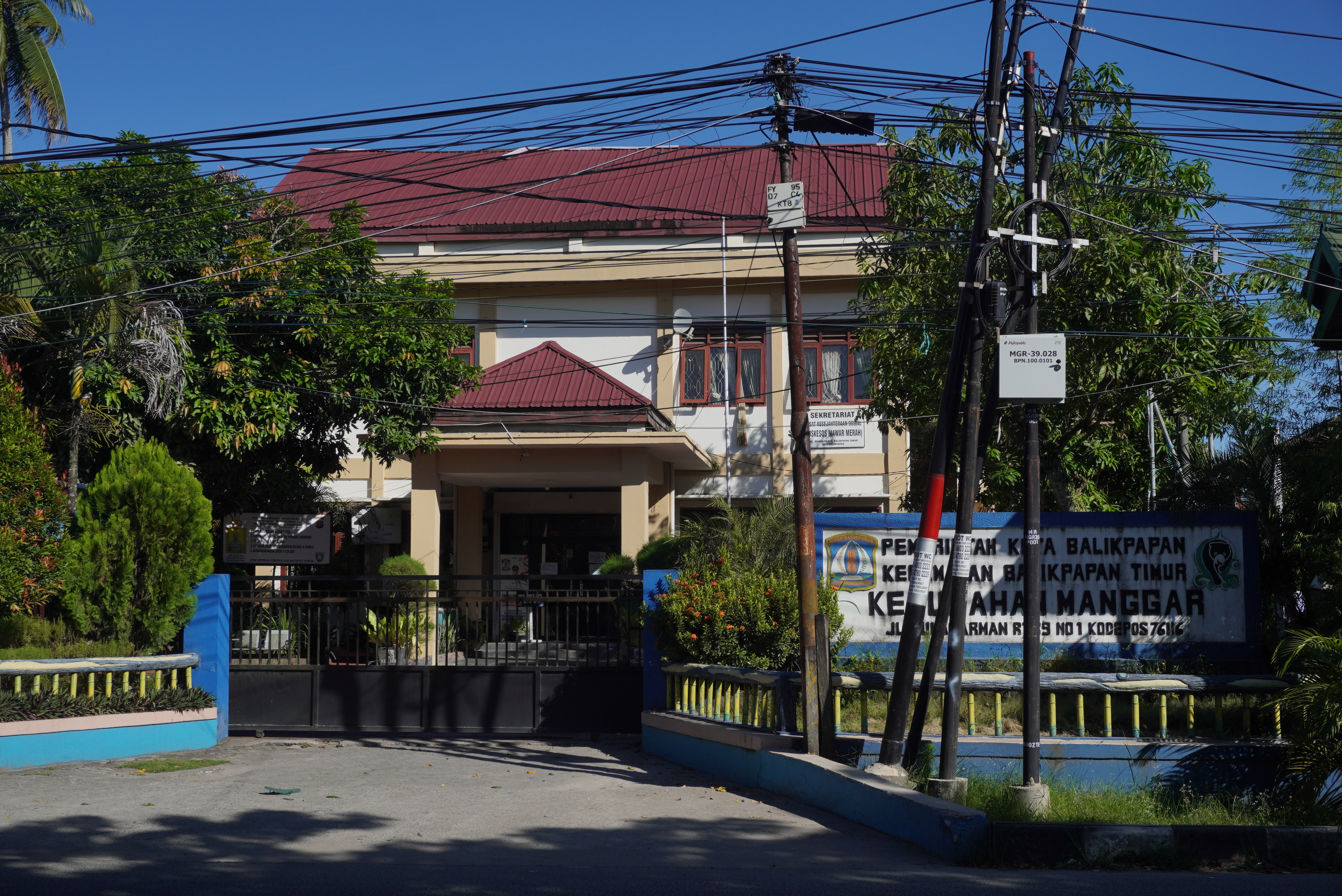
- (From the top: Manggar Segarasari Beach bottom: Office government Manggar Baru subdistrict)

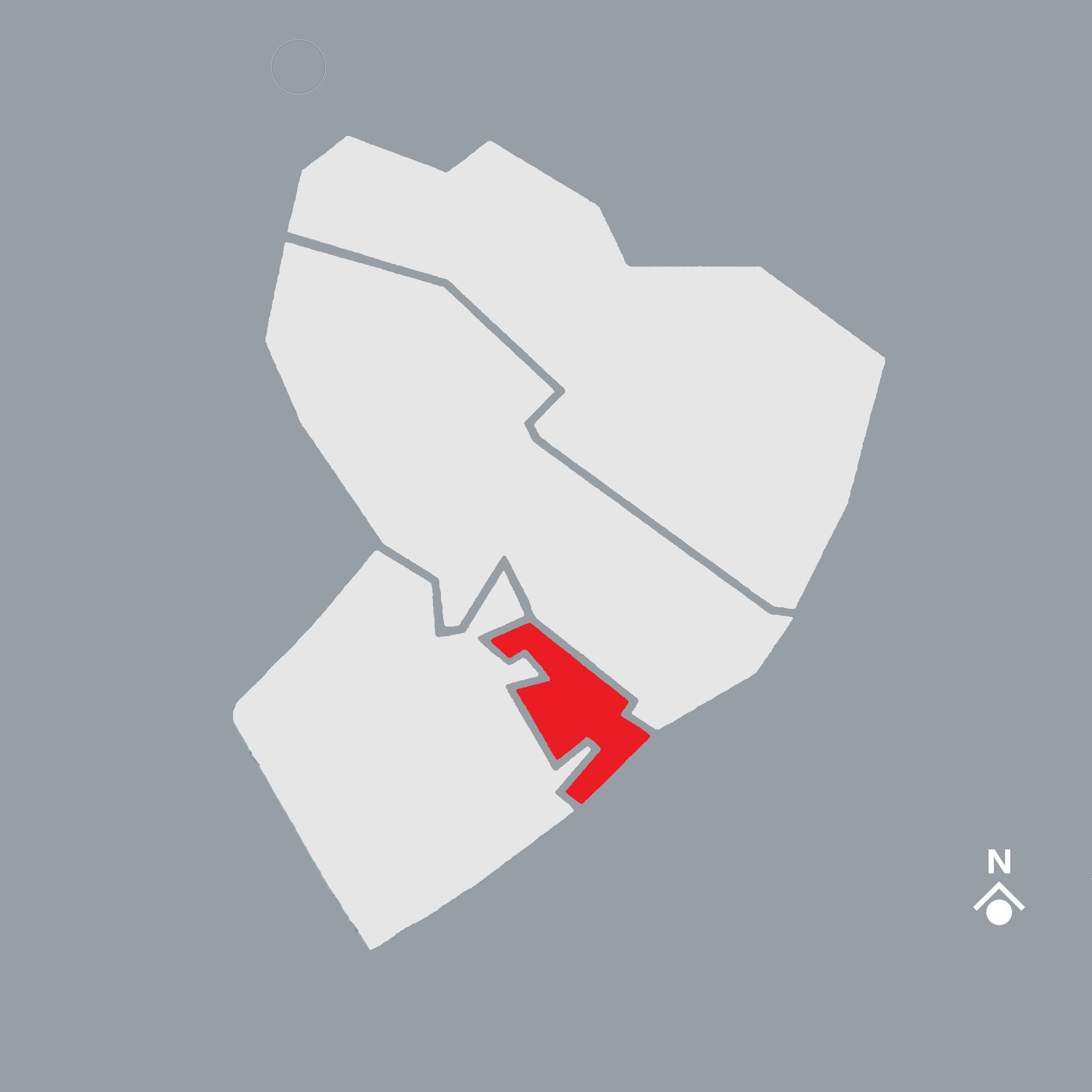
- Location of Manggar Baru subdistrict from East Balikpapan
- Interactive map of Manggar Baru subdistrict
- Coordinates: 1.217846°S 116.967402°E
- Country: Indonesia
- Province: East Kalimantan
- City: Balikpapan
- District: East Balikpapan

Area
  - Total: 3.836 km^{2} (1.481 sq mi)
- Time zone: GMT +8

Manggar Baru is a subdistrict in the East Balikpapan, Balikpapan. On August 16, 2013, Manggar Baru became one of the representatives of East Kalimantan who participated in the "Best Subdistrict at the National", then passed the verification stage from the national assessment team and made it into the top six subdistrict national held in Jakarta.

== Tourisms ==
- Manggar Segarasari Beach (Pantai Manggar Segarasari)
