= East Balikpapan =

East Balikpapan Kecamatan Balikpapan Timur
- District
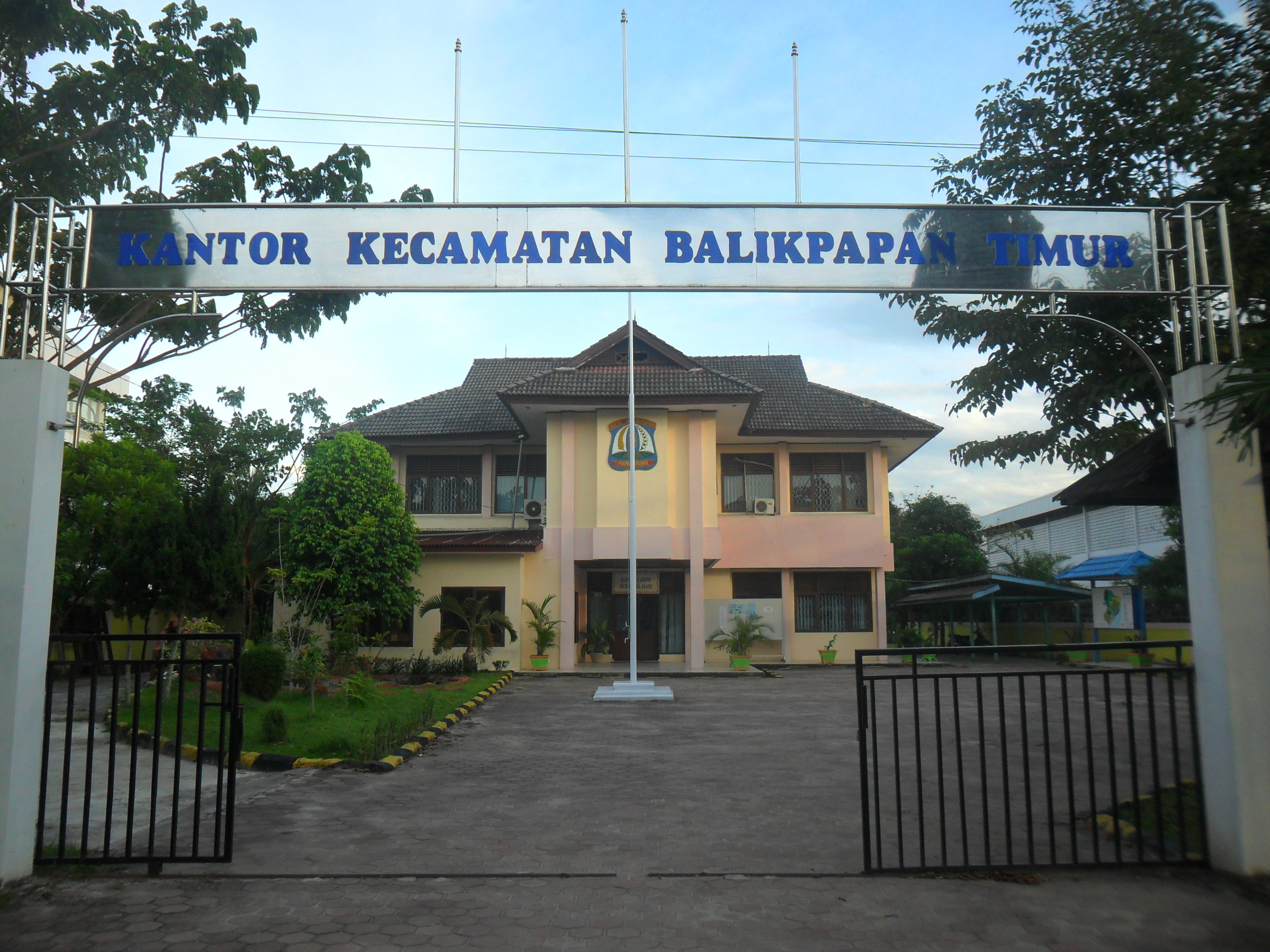
- Government office of East Balikpapan districts

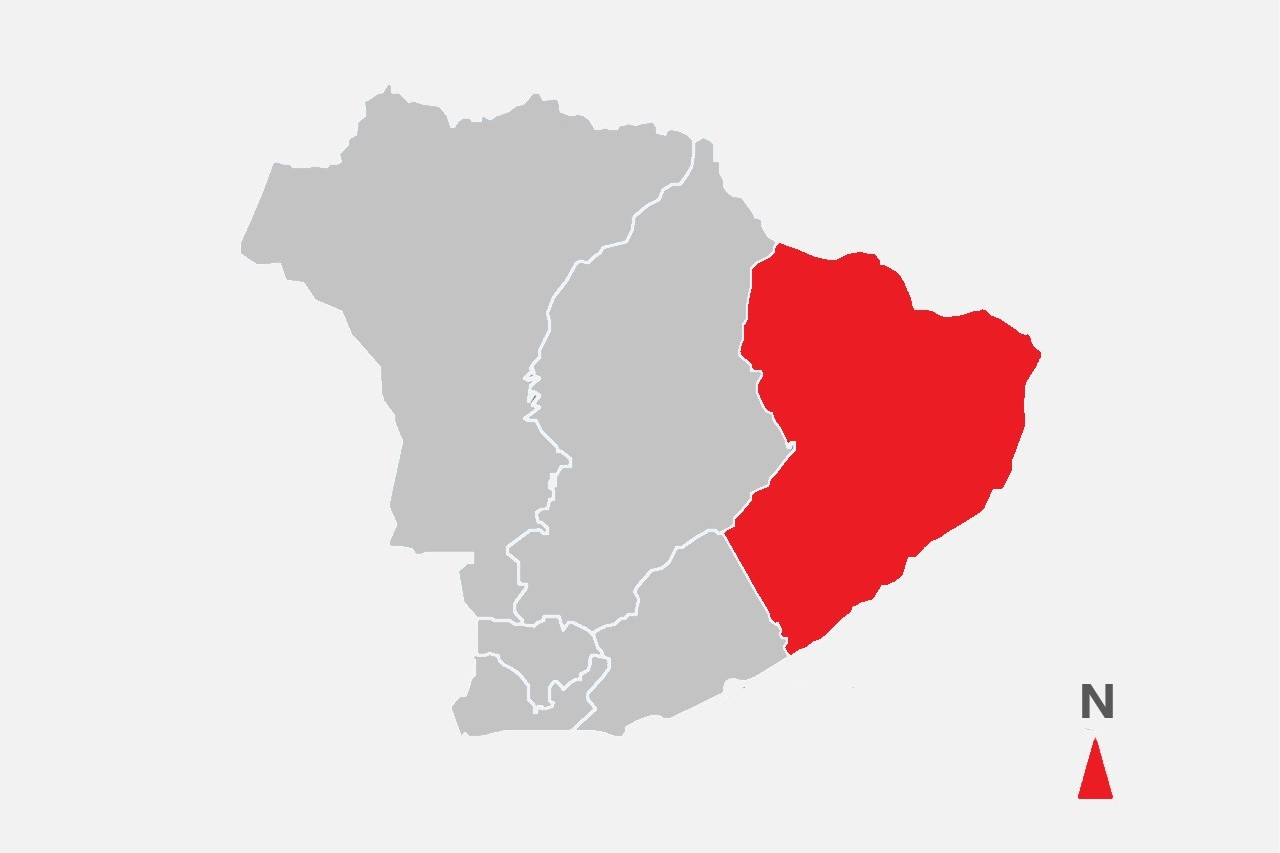
- East Balikpapan District Location of East Balikpapan district in Balikpapan
- Interactive map of East Balikpapan district
- Coordinates: 01°12′54″S 116°58′21″E
- Country: Indonesia
- Province: East Kalimantan
- City: Balikpapan
- Administrative subdistricts: 4
- Established: 11 June 1996

Government
  - District mayor: Purwantoro

Area
  - Total: 137.158 km^{2} (52.957 sq mi)

Population (2018)(from BPS)
  - Total: 70,034
  - Density: 510.61/km^{2} (1,322.5/sq mi)
- Time zone: GMT +8
- Website: Official website (in Indonesia)

East Balikpapan is a district in the city of Balikpapan, East Kalimantan, Indonesia. There area of this district is 92.42 km^{2} in water, and in land an area is 137.158 km^{2}. East Balikpapan is bordered by Kutai Kartanegara Regency to the North, by the Makassar Strait to the South and East, and by North Balikpapan district to the West.

== History ==
East Balikpapan was established on 11 June 1996, after being split off from the eastern part of South Balikpapan district.

== Economics ==
=== Tourism ===
There are contains numerous popular tourist spots, both modern historical & modern. These include Japanese Soldier Tomb Monument, Teritip Crocodile Breeding Zoo and the popular beach like as Manggar Segarasari Beach and Lamaru Beach.

=== Agricultural ===
Apart from being known for its coastal area, there is the center for agricultural food in Teritip subdistrict. In agriculture, Papaya is one of the most commonly cultivated fruits and cultivates vegetable horticulture. In addition, there are poultry raising that is sufficient to meet food needs. In the Gunung Binjai area, there are extensive zalacca plantations. Not only agriculture, this district has production, processing and marketing centers for fishery commodities in Manggar and Manggar Baru subdistricts.

=== Manufactures ===
Some multinational corporations operate in East Balikpapan district. Companies including Baker Hughes (US), Halliburton (US), Schlumberger (France), Thiess (Australia), Komatsu (Japan), Elnusa (Indonesia) and Weatherford International (US) use Manggar subdistricts as their base of operations in the region, and several others also attract many people to work in this area.

== Government ==
In military, there are contains Depo of Vocational Education Military is a school founded by the Main Regiment of Army Military Command VI/Mulawarman was operated in Manggar Baru subdistrict and Dhomber Airfield (known as the Indonesian Air Force Base in Balikpapan) is a base belonging to the air force located in Manggar subdistrict. Another the public government are office Police Sector in Lamaru subdistrict, and Community Health Centers and Office District in Manggar subdistrict.

== Sport ==
Batakan Stadium is a football stadium in Manggar subdistrict. The stadium hosts Liga 2 club Persiba Balikpapan and has a capacity of 40,000.

== Administrative divisions ==
East Balikpapan is divided into 4 administrative sub-districts:

Map of East Balikpapan's sub-districts
Maps of East Balikpapan's subdistricts
#	Name subdistricts (Kelurahan)	Area (km^{2})
1	Manggar	35.255
2	Lamaru	48.555
3	Teritip	49.512
4	Manggar Baru	3.836
Total		137.158

== Infrastructure ==
=== Historical architecture ===
- Japanese Soldier Tomb Monument (Monumen Makam Tentara Jepang)

=== Nature and park ===
- Teritip Crocodile Breeding Zoo (Penangkaran Buaya Teritip)
- Manggar Segarasari Beach (Pantai Manggar Segarasari)
- Lamaru Beach (Pantai Lamaru)
- Batakan Beach (Pantai Batakan)
- Serumpun Beach (Pantai Serumpun)
- Surya Hill Recreational Park (Taman Rekreasi Bukit Surya)
- Mangrove Forest Hall Barnacle Conservation (Hutan Manggrove Pendopo)
- Alpha Hill (Bukit Alpha)
- Lamaru Mirror Lake (Danau Cermin)

=== Educations ===
- Public 8 of Junior School (SMP Negeri 8)
- Public 13 of Junior School (SMP Negeri 13)
- Public 19 of Junior School (SMP Negeri 19)
- Public 7 of High School (SMA Negeri 7)
- Public 1 of Madrasah Ibtidayah (MI Negeri 1)
- Public 5 of Vocational High School (SMK Negeri 5)
