= Lamaru, Balikpapan =

Lamaru Kelurahan Lamaru
- Subdistrict
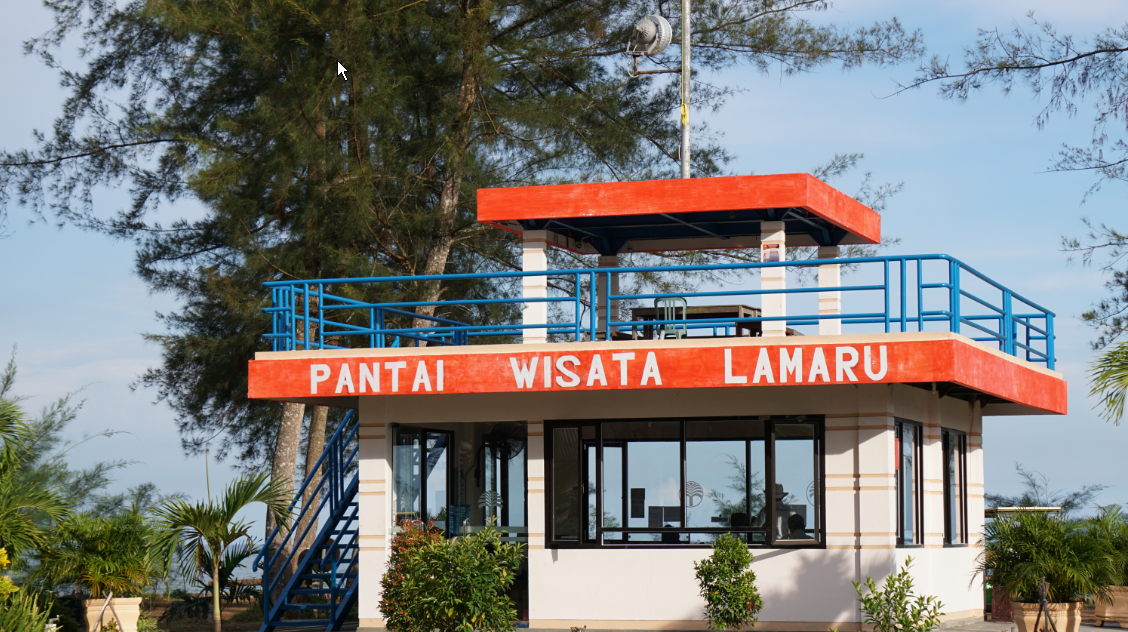
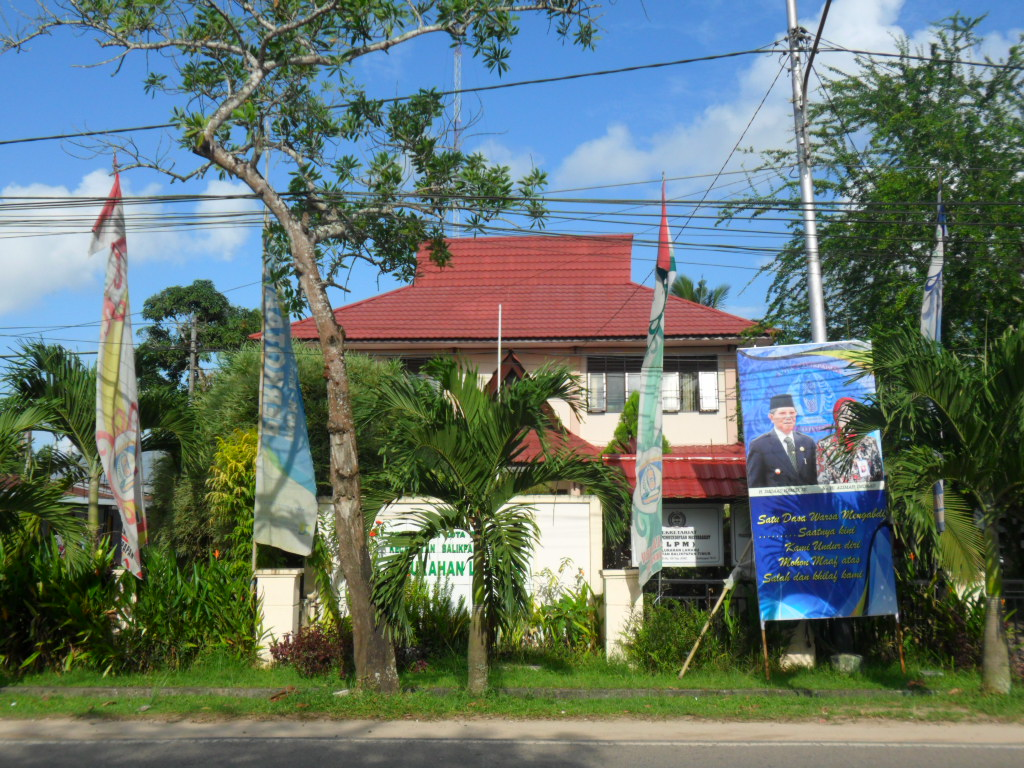
- (From the top: Lamaru Beach guard post bottom: Office government Lamaru subdistrict)

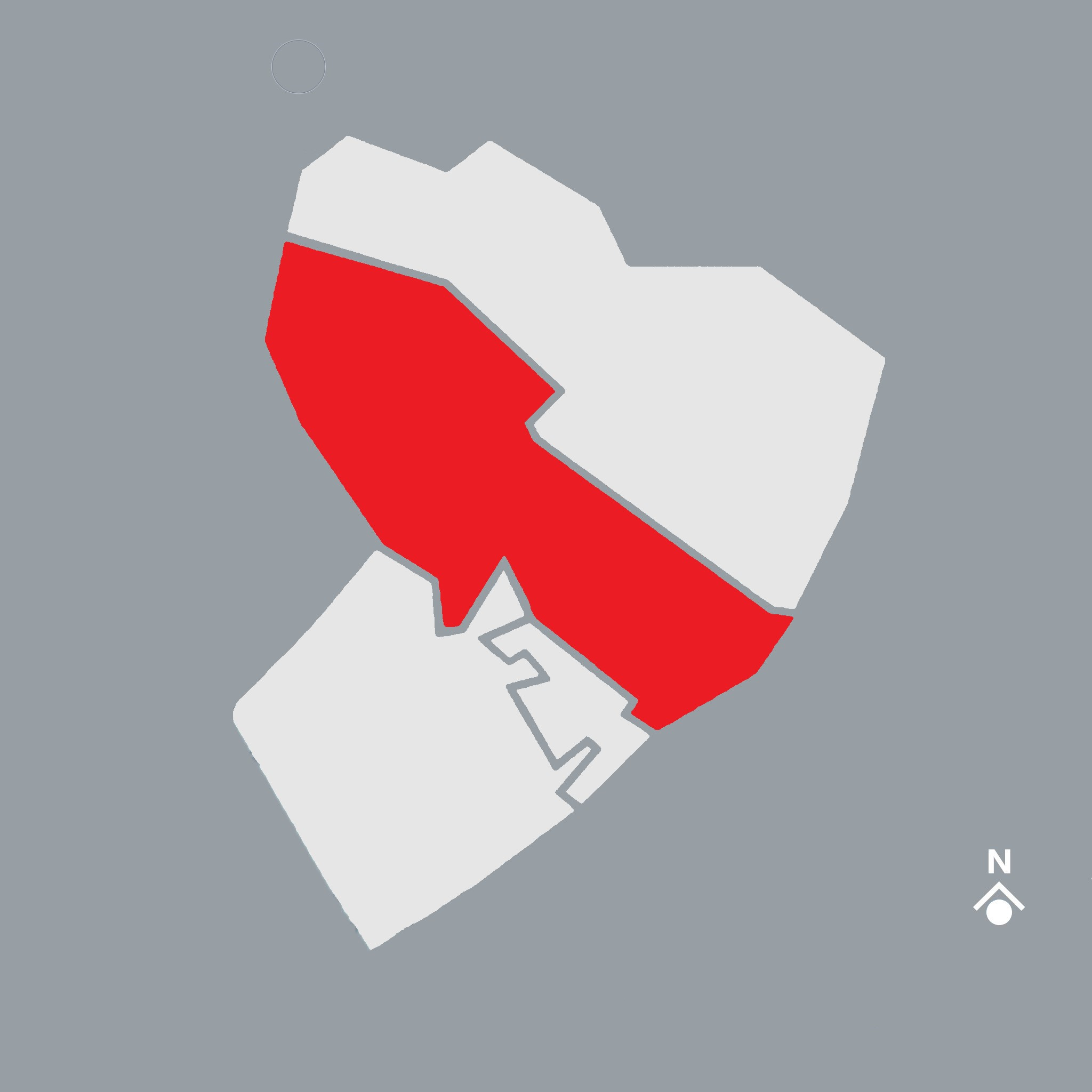
- Map Lamaru subdistrict of Balikpapan Location of Lamaru subdistrict from East Balikpapan
- Interactive map of Lamaru subdistrict
- Coordinates: 1.168933°S 116.966972°E
- Country: Indonesia
- Province: East Kalimantan
- City: Balikpapan
- District: East Balikpapan

Government
  - Subdistrict mayor: Surata

Area
  - Total: 48.555 km^{2} (18.747 sq mi)
- Time zone: GMT +8
- Website: Official website (in Indonesia)

Lamaru is a subdistrict in the East Balikpapan, Balikpapan.

== Tourisms ==
- Japanese Soldier Tomb Monument (Monumen Makam Tentara Jepang)
- Lamaru Beach (Pantai Lamaru)
- Lamaru Mirror Lake (Danau Cermin)
