= Teritip, Balikpapan =

Teritip Kelurahan Teritip
- Subdistrict
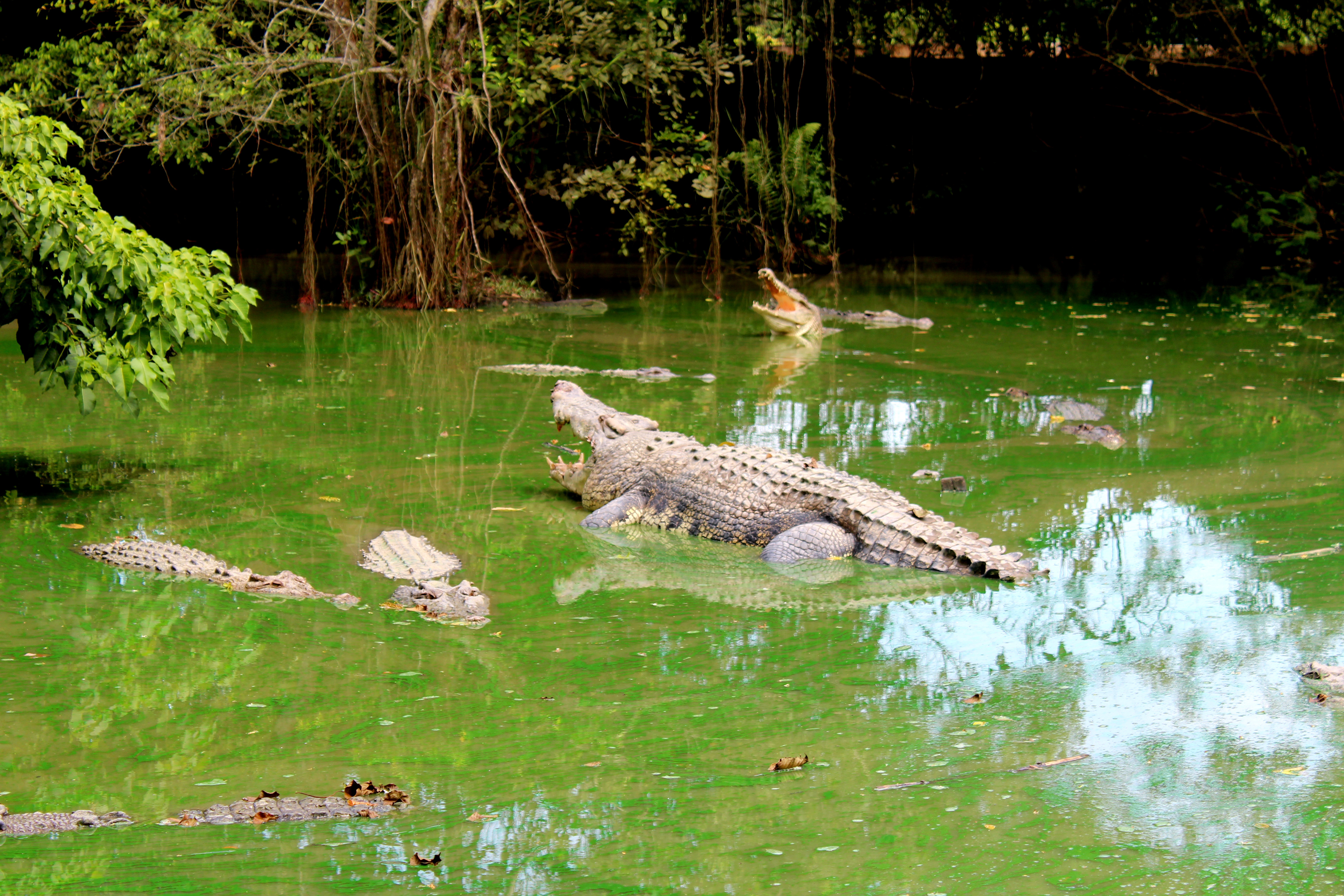
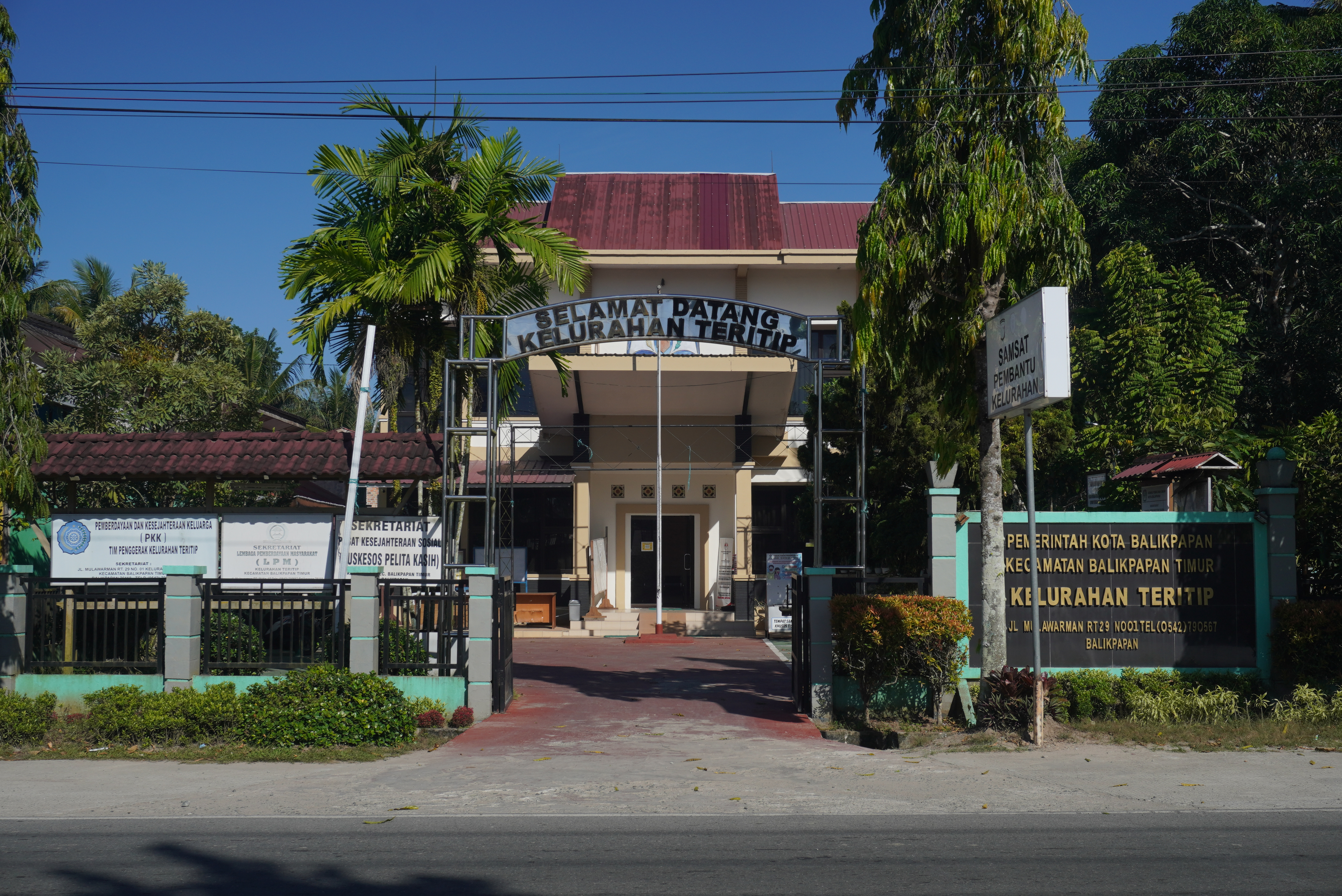
- (From the top: Teritip Crocodile Breeding Zoo bottom: Office government Lamaru subdistrict)

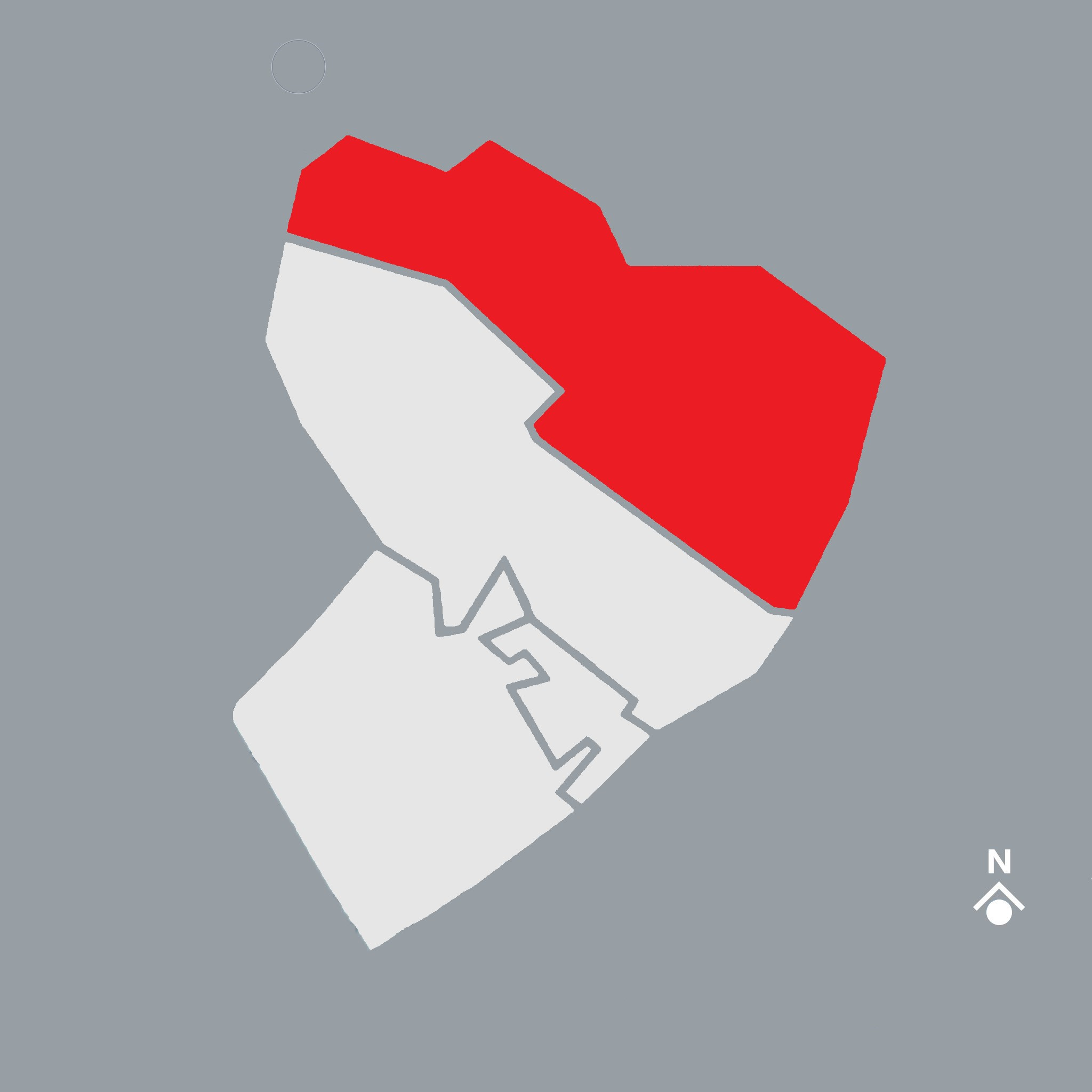
- Location of Teritip subdistrict from East Balikpapan
- Interactive map of Teritip subdistrict
- Coordinates: 1.158635°S 116.967659°E
- Country: Indonesia
- Province: East Kalimantan
- City: Balikpapan
- District: East Balikpapan

Government
  - Subdistrict mayor: Rudy Iskandar

Area
  - Total: 49.512 km^{2} (19.117 sq mi)
- Time zone: GMT +8
- Website: Official website (in Indonesia)

Teritip is a subdistrict in the district of East Balikpapan, Balikpapan, East Kalimantan, Indonesia.

Prior to the annexations of 1969 by Balikpapan and Samarinda, Teritip formerly belonged to the district of Samboja.

== Tourisms ==
- Teritip Crocodile Breeding Zoo (Penangkaran Buaya Teritip)
- Serumpun Beach (Pantai Serumpun)
- Surya Hill Recreational Park (Taman Rekreasi Bukit Surya)
- Mangrove Forest Hall Barnacle Conservation (Hutan Manggrove Pendopo)
